= List of villages in Finnmark =

This is a list of villages in Finnmark, a county in Norway. For other counties see the lists of villages in Norway. The list does not include towns and cities located in Finnmark. The villages that are the administrative centres of their municipalities are marked (†) and highlighted in blue.

Most villages in this county have Norwegian language names, but many areas also have Sami language and Kven language names. This is especially common in the bilingual municipalities of Tana, Nesseby, Porsanger, Kautokeino, and Karasjok. When there are multiple official names for a village, they are included in this list.

Place	Coordinates	Postal code	Municipality
Áisaroaivi	70°16′08″N 24°06′03″E	9620	Hammerfest
Akkarfjord (Kvaløya)	70°36′43″N 23°38′59″E	9610	Hammerfest
Akkarfjord (Sørøya)	70°47′41″N 23°23′30″E	9650	Hammerfest
Andsnes	70°14′06″N 21°14′12″E	9186	Loppa
Austertana; Juovlavuotna (Northern Sami)	70°26′18″N 28°30′39″E	9845	Tana
Bekkarfjord	70°35′03″N 27°14′50″E	9740	Lebesby
Bergsfjord	70°14′57″N 21°47′31″E	9580	Loppa
Berlevåg (†)	70°51′28″N 29°05′10″E	9980	Berlevåg
Bjørnevatn	69°40′02″N 29°59′16″E	9910	Sør-Varanger
Bonakas; Bonjákas (Northern Sami)	70°25′36″N 28°14′00″E	9845	Tana
Breivik	70°35′55″N 22°06′29″E	9595	Hasvik
Breivikbotn (†)	70°35′19″N 22°17′05″E	9593	Hasvik
Brenna; Breannjá (Northern Sami); Prännä (Kven)	70°30′22″N 25°43′54″E	9716	Porsanger
Brennelv; Lavttejohka (Northern Sami); Palo (Kven)	70°03′15″N 25°01′49″E	9700	Porsanger
Bugøynes	69°58′22″N 29°38′34″E	9935	Sør-Varanger
Bugøyfjord	69°52′05″N 29°20′45″E	9934	Sør-Varanger
Børselv; Bissojohka (Northern Sami); Pyssyjoki (Kven)	70°19′03″N 25°33′58″E	9716	Porsanger
Båtsfjord (†)	70°38′04″N 29°43′06″E	9990	Båtsfjord
Dorvonjárga	69°24′01″N 25°49′40″E	9730	Karasjok
Dønnesfjord	70°38′55″N 22°37′46″E	9593	Hasvik
Dyfjord	70°53′53″N 27°13′29″E	9782	Lebesby
Eiby	69°53′10″N 23°12′13″E	9518	Alta
Ekkerøy	70°04′26″N 30°06′12″E	9800	Vadsø
Elvenes	69°40′45″N 30°06′20″E	9900	Sør-Varanger
Finnkongkeila	70°54′39″N 28°27′12″E	9771	Gamvik
Forsøl	70°43′18″N 23°48′22″E	9600	Hammerfest
Fægfjord	70°28′49″N 24°13′23″E	9620	Hammerfest
Gamvik	71°03′49″N 28°14′48″E	9775	Gamvik
Gjesvær	71°05′33″N 25°23′34″E	9765	Nordkapp
Golnes	70°04′23″N 30°01′56″E	9800	Vadsø
Grense Jakobselv	69°46′31″N 30°49′53″E	9900	Sør-Varanger
Gunnarnes	70°59′54″N 24°06′59″E	9670	Måsøy
Hakkstabben	70°16′42″N 23°07′21″E	9532	Alta
Halsen; Čeaváhaš (Northern Sami)	70°30′37″N 24°01′18″E	9620	Hammerfest
Hamna i Ryggefjord; Hávdna (Northern Sami)	70°52′22″N 24°56′11″E	9692	Måsøy
Hamningberg	70°32′26″N 30°36′52″E	9990	Båtsfjord
Hasvik	70°29′11″N 22°09′39″E	9590	Hasvik
Havøysund (†); Ávanuorri (Northern Sami)	70°59′46″N 24°39′43″E	9690	Måsøy
Hellefjord	70°42′58″N 23°17′38″E	9653	Hammerfest
Hesseng	69°41′15″N 29°59′20″E	9912	Sør-Varanger
Hønsebybotn	70°31′58″N 23°24′35″E	9609	Hammerfest
Ifjord; Idjavuotna (Northern Sami)	70°27′46″N 27°06′22″E	9783	Lebesby
Igeldas; Ikkaldas (Northern Sami)	70°12′50″N 24°54′57″E	9710	Porsanger
Indre Billefjord; Billávuotna (Northern Sami); Pillavuono (Kven)	70°18′54″N 25°02′46″E	9710	Porsanger
Ingøy	71°05′04″N 24°03′30″E	9672	Måsøy
Isnestoften	70°08′02″N 22°59′21″E	9540	Alta
Ivarsfjord	70°48′45″N 27°57′25″E	9771	Gamvik
Jakobsnes	69°43′42″N 30°07′31″E	9900	Sør-Varanger
Kamøyvær	71°02′55″N 25°54′19″E	9750	Nordkapp
Karasjok (†); Kárášjohka (Northern Sami)	69°28′18″N 25°30′40″E	9730	Karasjok
Karlebotn; Stuorravuonna (Northern Sami)	70°07′21″N 28°34′31″E	9840	Nesseby
Kautokeino (†); Guovdageaidnu (Northern Sami)	69°00′44″N 23°02′27″E	9520	Kautokeino
Kiberg; Kiiperi (Kven)	70°17′07″N 30°59′53″E	9960	Vardø
Kiby	70°03′44″N 29°51′26″E	9800	Vadsø
Kifjord	70°54′51″N 27°23′26″E	9790	Lebesby
Kistrand; Čuđegieddi (Northern Sami); Ryssämarkka (Kven)	70°26′18″N 25°11′58″E	9713	Porsanger
Kjelvik	71°00′07″N 26°06′45″E	9750	Nordkapp
Kjøllefjord (†)	70°56′44″N 27°20′47″E	9790	Lebesby
Klubbukt; Klubbu (Northern Sami)	70°32′07″N 24°06′39″E	9620	Hammerfest
Kokelv; Goavkejohka (Northern Sami)	70°36′44″N 24°38′21″E	9715	Hammerfest
Komagfjord	70°15′38″N 23°24′33″E	9536	Alta
Komagvær; Kumaveri (Kven)	70°14′44″N 30°32′02″E	9960	Vardø
Kongsfjord	70°43′13″N 29°19′10″E	9982	Berlevåg
Kongshus	70°08′40″N 23°16′05″E	9533	Alta
Korsfjorden	70°14′51″N 23°23′10″E	9536	Alta
Krampenes	70°06′18″N 30°11′44″E	9800	Vadsø
Kunes; Gussanjárga (Northern Sami)	70°21′02″N 26°31′22″E	9742	Lebesby
Kvalsund; Ráhkkerávju (Northern Sami)	70°30′09″N 23°58′47″E	9620	Hammerfest
Kvenvik; Šuovošluovta (Northern Sami)	69°55′37″N 23°06′17″E	9518	Alta
Kviby	70°06′54″N 23°22′53″E	9519	Alta
Kåfjord	69°56′13″N 23°01′39″E	9518	Alta
Kåfjord	70°52′34″N 25°45′20″E	9750	Nordkapp
Kårhamn	70°32′40″N 23°08′53″E	9657	Hammerfest
Láhpoluoppal	69°12′31″N 23°45′36″E	9525	Kautokeino
Lakselv (†); Leavdnja (Northern Sami); Lemmijoki (Kven)	70°03′04″N 24°58′18″E	9700	Porsanger
Langnes	70°06′24″N 22°59′53″E	9540	Alta
Langfjordbotn; Lákkovuonbahta (Northern Sami)	70°02′23″N 22°15′28″E	9545	Alta
Langfjordbotn	70°37′24″N 27°38′37″E	9772	Gamvik
Langfjordeid	69°35′14″N 29°56′44″E	9910	Sør-Varanger
Langfjordhamn	70°08′21″N 21°51′39″E	9583	Loppa
Langfjordnes; Goalsevuohppi (Northern Sami)	70°43′10″N 28°04′58″E	9772	Gamvik
Lebesby; Davvesiida (Northern Sami)	70°34′22″N 27°00′07″E	9740	Lebesby
Leirbotn	70°07′08″N 23°23′38″E	9519	Alta
Lille Lerresfjord; Liidnavuonna (Northern Sami)	70°19′58″N 23°30′48″E	9536	Alta
Loppa	70°20′01″N 21°27′02″E	9586	Loppa
Mafjord	71°03′46″N 23°59′42″E	9672	Måsøy
Masi; Máze (Northern Sami)	69°26′37″N 23°40′01″E	9525	Kautokeino
Mehamn (†)	71°02′08″N 27°50′57″E	9770	Gamvik
Måsøy	71°00′38″N 24°58′51″E	9692	Måsøy
Neiden	69°41′39″N 29°23′00″E	9930	Sør-Varanger
Nerskogen; Alaouta (Kven)	69°58′08″N 23°25′47″E	9517	Alta
Nervei; Njereveadji (Northern Sami)	70°39′55″N 27°51′17″E	9771	Gamvik
Nesseby; Unjárga (Northern Sami)	70°09′07″N 28°51′54″E	9820	Nesseby
Nordfjorden	70°32′39″N 30°05′58″E	9990	Båtsfjord
Nordmannset	70°52′15″N 27°30′15″E	9783	Lebesby
Nordvågen	70°58′49″N 26°01′55″E	9760	Nordkapp
Nuvsvåg	70°16′10″N 22°06′57″E	9582	Loppa
Nyelv; Ođđajohka (Northern Sami)	70°04′14″N 28°50′52″E	9820	Nesseby
Nyvoll; Gárgu (Northern Sami)	70°13′34″N 23°22′49″E	9519	Alta
Olderfjord; Leaibevuotna (Northern Sami); Leipovuono (Kven)	70°28′25″N 25°04′16″E	9713	Porsanger
Oldernes	70°26′54″N 24°19′02″E	9620	Hammerfest
Oldervik	70°31′32″N 24°10′34″E	9620	Hammerfest
Pasvik	69°48′39″N 30°33′59″E	9900	Sør-Varanger
Polmak; Buolbmát (Northern Sami)	70°04′14″N 28°00′26″E	9845	Tana
Porsangmoen; Ingásguolbba (Northern Sami)	69°54′13″N 24°59′58″E	9709	Porsanger
Rafsbotn; Rässivuono (Kven)	70°01′07″N 23°32′14″E	9517	Alta
Repvåg; Reiffváhki (Northern Sami)	70°44′48″N 25°40′19″E	9768	Nordkapp
Revsneshamn; Áhpenjárgohppi (Northern Sami)	70°40′52″N 24°21′11″E	9624	Hammerfest
Russelv; Ruoššajohka (Northern Sami)	70°28′11″N 23°37′07″E	9715	Hammerfest
Rustefjelbma; Ruostefielbmá (Northern Sami)	70°23′55″N 28°11′36″E	9845	Tana
Rypefjord	70°38′28″N 23°40′19″E	9610	Hammerfest
Sandland; Sáttomohgáddi (Northern Sami)	70°16′02″N 21°36′10″E	9585	Loppa
Sandnes	69°40′11″N 29°56′43″E	9910	Sør-Varanger
Saraby; Jiepmaluokta (Northern Sami)	70°23′06″N 23°34′58″E	9620	Hammerfest
Sarnes	70°58′24″N 25°47′42″E	9750	Nordkapp
Sieiddá	70°13′52″N 28°10′43″E	9845	Tana
Siebe	68°51′57″N 23°08′32″E	9520	Kautokeino
Sirma; Sirbmá (Northern Sami)	70°00′52″N 27°23′54″E	9826	Tana
Skaidi	70°25′57″N 24°30′07″E	9620	Hammerfest
Skallelv; Gállojohka (Northern Sami); Kallijoki (Kven)	70°11′21″N 30°20′06″E	9800	Vadsø
Skarsvåg	71°06′47″N 25°49′37″E	9763	Nordkapp
Skarvfjordhamn	70°45′33″N 23°07′10″E	9663	Hammerfest
Skavnakk	70°14′09″N 21°25′20″E	9587	Loppa
Skiippagurra	70°09′59″N 28°13′29″E	9845	Tana
Skjånes	70°48′01″N 28°05′55″E	9773	Gamvik
Skoganvarre; Skuvvanvárri (Northern Sami)	69°50′23″N 25°04′41″E	9722	Porsanger
Skogfoss; Hakokoski (Kven)	69°22′27″N 29°41′38″E	9925	Sør-Varanger
Skrotnes; Roskaniemi (Kven)	69°25′39″N 29°59′39″E	9925	Sør-Varanger
Slettelv; Šleafttajohka (Northern Sami)	70°30′17″N 24°03′23″E	9620	Hammerfest
Slåtten; Muotki (Northern Sami)	70°45′11″N 24°32′55″E	9714	Måsøy
Smalfjord	70°26′25″N 28°03′46″E	9845	Tana
Smørfjord	70°31′34″N 25°05′25″E	9713	Porsanger
Snefjord; Muorral (Northern Sami)	70°47′22″N 24°36′40″E	9714	Måsøy
Stallogargo; Stállogárggu (Northern Sami)	70°31′22″N 23°58′54″E	9620	Hammerfest
Storbukt	69°41′09″N 30°27′31″E	9900	Sør-Varanger
Store Kvalfjord	70°19′05″N 22°52′06″E	9531	Alta
Store Lerresfjord	70°17′02″N 23°32′17″E	9536	Alta
Store Molvik	70°47′14″N 28°40′16″E	9980	Berlevåg
Storekorsnes; Giranjárga (Northern Sami)	70°12′51″N 23°12′07″E	9519	Alta
Storskog	69°39′29″N 30°12′21″E	9910	Sør-Varanger
Šuoššjávri	69°22′33″N 24°15′19″E	9730	Karasjok
Svanvik	69°27′35″N 30°02′10″E	9925	Sør-Varanger
Svartnes	70.3587°N 31.0311°E	9950	Vardø
Syltefjord	70°34′20″N 30°14′34″E	9990	Båtsfjord
Sønvismoen	69°55′27″N 23°29′36″E	9517	Alta
Sør-Tverrfjord	70°13′10″N 21°42′50″E	9584	Loppa
Sørbotnen	70°57′23″N 27°33′08″E	9790	Lebesby
Sørvær	70°37′49″N 21°59′04″E	9595	Hasvik
Talvik	70°02′32″N 22°56′59″E	9540	Alta
Tana bru (†); Deanušaldi (Northern Sami)	70°11′56″N 28°11′25″E	9845	Tana
Tappeluft; Dáhpeluokta (Northern Sami)	70°05′15″N 22°28′29″E	9545	Alta
Trollfjorden	70°40′48″N 28°37′48″E	9980	Berlevåg
Tufjord	71°00′17″N 23°54′31″E	9670	Måsøy
Transfarelv; Gáidoš (Northern Sami); Kaitusjoki (Kven)	69°59′02″N 23°29′04″E	9517	Alta
Turelva	70°01′39″N 23°24′17″E	9517	Alta
Tverrelvdalen; Fallijoki (Kven)	69°56′42″N 23°23′31″E	9517	Alta
Tårnet	69°40′26″N 30°26′35″E	9900	Sør-Varanger
Valan	71°00′32″N 25°58′41″E	9750	Nordkapp
Valen	70°04′44″N 30°05′29″E	9800	Vadsø
Váljohka	69°41′27″N 25°55′43″E	9730	Karasjok
Varangerbotn (†); Vuonnabahta (Northern Sami)	70°10′21″N 28°33′21″E	9820	Nesseby
Vassdalen	70°13′51″N 22°21′51″E	9550	Loppa
Veidnes	70°39′27″N 26°35′17″E	9717	Lebesby
Vesterelv	70°31′54″N 30°00′25″E	9990	Båtsfjord
Vestre Jakobselv; Ánnejohka (Northern Sami); Annijoki (Kven)	70°06′41″N 29°19′59″E	9802	Vadsø
Ystnes	70°15′27″N 22°21′10″E	9550	Loppa
Øksfjord (†); Ákšovuotna (Northern Sami)	70°14′21″N 22°22′17″E	9550	Loppa
Øksfjordbotn	70°06′31″N 22°31′39″E	9550	Loppa
Øvre Alta	69°55′31″N 23°15′51″E	9518	Alta
Øvre Brennelv; Yli-Palo (Kven)	70°03′03″N 25°04′03″E	9700	Porsanger
