= Loppa =

Loppa may refer to:

== Places ==
- Loppa Municipality, a municipality in Finnmark county, Norway
- Loppa (village), a small village in Loppa Municipality in Finnmark county, Norway
- Loppa (island), a small island in Loppa Municipality in Finnmark county, Norway
- Loppa Sea or Lopphavet, a sea off the coast of Finnmark county, Norway
- Loppa (lake), a lake on the border of Sweden and Norway, east of the village of Sulitjelma
- Loppa (Antarctica), a mountain in Queen Maud Land in Antarctica

== People ==
- Linda Loppa, a Belgian fashion designer and consultant
