= Nuvsfjorden =

Fjord in Vestfold, Norway

Nuvsfjorden (Norwegian); Cuokcavuotna (Northern Sami)
- Interactive map of the fjord
- Location: Finnmark county, Norway
- Coordinates: 70°16′00″N 22°05′50″E
- Type: Fjord
- Basin countries: Norway
- Max. length: 8 kilometres (5.0 mi)

Nuvsfjorden (Norwegian) or Cuokcavuotna (Northern Sami) is a fjord in Loppa Municipality in Finnmark county, Norway. The fjord has a length of about 8 kilometres (5.0 mi).

The village of Nuvsvåg is located along the fjord. The Øksfjordjøkelen glacier lies about 5 kilometres (3.1 mi) south of the head of the fjord.

== Name ==
The name is from the Norwegian word nuv, meaning rounded hump or mountain, which is also the name of the rounded mountain Nuven at the mouth of the fjord. The Old Norse name Hnúfafjǫrðr comes from the word hnúfa, which either means hump, but it's also a byname alternately meaning "snub" or snub-nosed. The word "'hnufa' also refers to a bondmaid whose nose has been cut off for theft thrice repeated.
