= Sandland =

Village in Loppa, Norway

Sandland (Norwegian); Sáttomohgáddi (Northern Sami)
- Village
- Interactive map of: Sandland (Norwegian); Sáttomohgáddi (Northern Sami)
- Location within Finnmark Location within Norway
- Coordinates: 70.2672°N 21.6028°E
- Country: Norway
- Region: Northern Norway
- County: Finnmark
- District: Vest-Finnmark
- Municipality: Loppa Municipality
- Elevation: 5 m (16 ft)
- Time zone: UTC+01:00 (CET)
  - Summer (DST): UTC+02:00 (CEST)
- Post Code: 9585 Sandland

Sandland (Norwegian) or Sáttomohgáddi (Northern Sami) is a village in Loppa Municipality in Finnmark county, Norway. The village is located on the mainland part of Loppa, along the Sandlandsfjorden, across from the uninhabited island of Silda. The nearby village of Sør-Tverrfjord lies about 8 kilometres (5.0 mi) to the southeast. Sandland Chapel is located in the village.

Sandland is connected to Sør-Tverrfjord and a few other small villages by a road along the shore of the Sandlandsfjorden; however, this road is not connected to anything else. The only connection to the rest of Norway is a ferry that travels between the three villages of Øksfjord to Bergsfjord to Sør-Tverrfjord.
