= Loppa (island) =

Island in Norway

Loppa (Norwegian); Láhppi (Northern Sami); Lappea (Kven)
- Interactive map of: Loppa (Norwegian); Láhppi (Northern Sami); Lappea (Kven)

Geography
- Location: Finnmark, Norway
- Coordinates: 70.3586°N 21.4139°E
- Area: 12 km^{2} (4.6 sq mi)
- Length: 7.5 km (4.66 mi)
- Width: 2.5 km (1.55 mi)
- Highest elevation: 289 m (948 ft)
- Highest point: Rektind

Administration
- Norway
- County: Finnmark
- Municipality: Loppa Municipality

Loppa (Norwegian), Láhppi (Northern Sami), or Lappea (Kven) is an island in Loppa Municipality in Finnmark county, Norway. The 12-square-kilometre (4.6 sq mi) island lies in the Lopphavet Sea in the western part of the municipality, west of the island of Silda. The small island has one village area (called Loppa) on the southeastern coast. This village used to be the administrative centre of Loppa and an important fishing village for the municipality, but all of the administration of the village was moved to Øksfjord on the mainland. Today, Loppa Church is still located in this village, but there are only a few residents remaining on the island.

== History ==
=== Roman Age ===
Little is known of this period historically and archaeologically on Loppa. However the discovering of a Roman Age longhouse from 120 AD, at the island of Loppa shows the earliest signs of settlement in the Early Iron Age. This may have been the beginning of Norse and Sami collaboration in the area, and of the interaction between the two peoples with trade and commerce in fishing and the industry of hunting of maritime mammals. The longhouse is also one of the oldest discovered in Northern Norway.

=== Viking Age ===
In 1962 a rich female Viking Age grave was discovered on the island of Loppa. It contained luxurious personal objects such as tortoise brooches, a round brooch in the Oseberg style, a whalebone plaque, beads, knife, scissor and an arrowhead. The female grave was dubbed "The Queens Grave" due to the manner in which she was buried; however, she was most likely not a queen but an important person indeed on Viking Age Loppa, perhaps the housewife of a local chieftain. The wealth of the grave reflects that of the Norse elite's presence in the area. The burial was dated to the 9th century AD.

In 1964 a longhouse from the Viking Age was also discovered and dated to the end of the 8th century AD. Several other buildings and boathouses were also discovered and dated to the same period as the longhouse and the rich female grave. There are also several burials from the Iron Age on the island, the biggest a burial cairn some 13 m in diameter. The number of Iron Age burials and houses suggest the presence of a permanent Norse settlement.

=== Middle Ages ===
In the Middle Ages, the hunting and the production of oil from marine mammals apparently ended, and fishing became more important. Along the coast of northern Norway we see so-called farm mounds of ancient settlements, and there are at least six farm mounds on the island of Loppa, on Silda, and on the mainland at Andsnes. However, the farm mounds of northern Norway seem to have their upbringing already in Early Iron Age, suggesting that fishing was already a commercial trade before the Middle Ages. On the island of Loppa one of the farm mounds was dated to the 1100s AD, with a church site close by. This suggests that Loppa was already a parish in the Middle Ages.

== Nature reserve ==
The western cliffs and steep slopes of the island form a nature reserve which was established in 1983. This, along with the adjacent marine waters, has also been designated an Important Bird Area (IBA) by BirdLife International because it supports large breeding colonies of Atlantic puffins and razorbills.

== See also ==
- List of islands of Norway
