= Langfjordbotn =

Langfjordbotn may refer to:

== Places ==
- Langfjordbotn, Alta, a village in Alta municipality in Finnmark county, Norway
- Langfjordbotn is another name for Langfjordhamn, a village in Loppa municipality in Finnmark county, Norway
- Langfjordbotn, Gamvik, a small bay at the end of the Langfjorden in Gamvik Municipality, Finnmark county, Norway
- Langfjordbotn, a farm in the village of Langfjordeid in Sør-Varanger Municipality in Finnmark county, Norway
