= Nuvsvåg =

Village in Loppa, Norway

- Village
- Interactive map of Nuvsvåg
- Location within Finnmark Location within Norway
- Coordinates: 70.2695°N 22.1160°E
- Country: Norway
- Region: Northern Norway
- County: Finnmark
- District: Vest-Finnmark
- Municipality: Loppa Municipality
- Elevation: 15 m (49 ft)
- Time zone: UTC+01:00 (CET)
  - Summer (DST): UTC+02:00 (CEST)
- Post Code: 9582 Nuvsvåg

Nuvsvåg is a village in Loppa Municipality in Finnmark county, Norway. The village is located on the mainland, along the Nuvsfjorden. This part of Loppa is a peninsula that has one road along the fjord, but it is only accessible by a ferry from the village of Øksfjord.

In 2015, there were 66 inhabitants in the village (Loppa municipality had 989 at that time). Nuvsvåg Chapel is located in this village. Nuvsvåg's primary industry is fishing.

== History ==
For a time, there was a wolffish-farm here, but due to a lack of funding, it closed after a short time.

On 25 May 2012, the municipal politicians decided to close the public school in Nuvsvåg. Then, in 2015, the one shop in Nuvsvåg closed. In June 2015 another food store was scheduled to open in its place, according to Klassekampen.

=== Name ===
The name is from the Norwegian word nuv, meaning rounded hump or mountain, which is also the name of the rounded mountain Nuven at the mouth of the fjord. The word derives from the Old Norse word hnúfa, which either means hump, but it's also a name alternately meaning "snub" or snub-nosed. The word "'hnufa' also refers to a bondmaid whose nose has been cut off for theft thrice repeated.

Nuvsvåg's old name was Nuvsfjord (Old Norse: Hnúfafjǫrðr) or sometimes spelled Nusfjord, and due to confusion with a village in Lofoten with the same name it was changed to Nuvsvåg.

== Geography ==
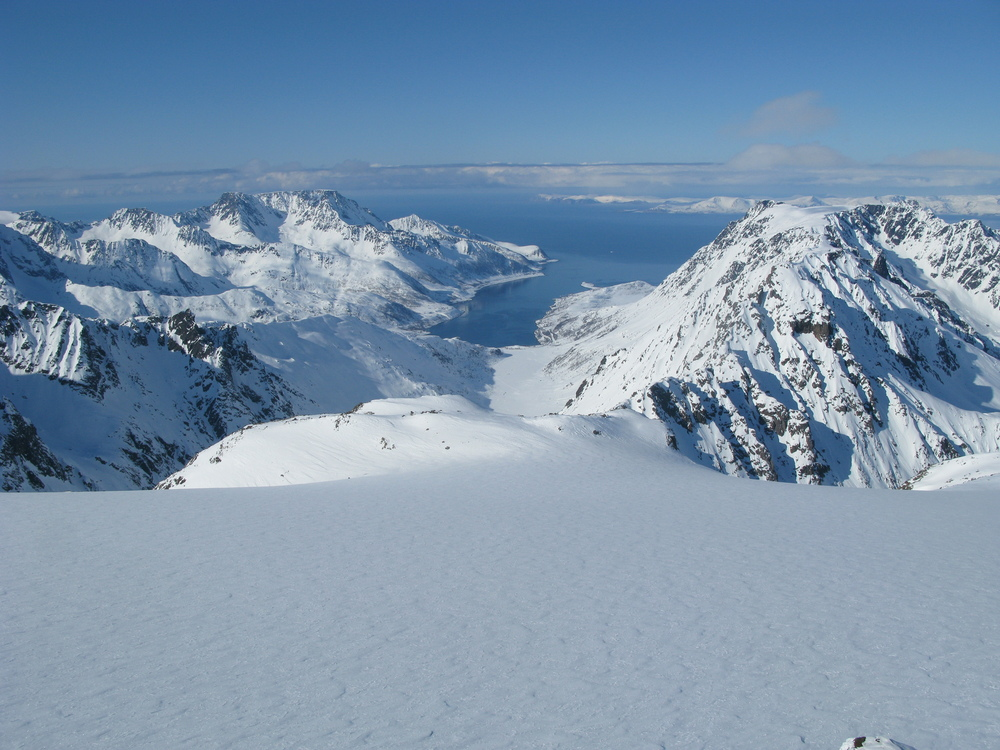
View of Nuvsvåg from Lopptinden. Nuvsvåg is on the top right side of the small fjord.

About 10 kilometres (6.2 mi) to the south of Nuvsvåg is Finnmark county's tallest mountain, Loppatinden, and the large glacier Øksfjordjøkelen. About 7 kilometres (4.3 mi) to the southwest of Nuvsvåg lies the mountain Svartfjellet and the glacier Svartfjelljøkelen.

== Commerce ==
In 2015, one fishing boat was based out of this village. Another fishing boat became inoperable due to fire, that year.
