= Kårhamn =

- Village
- Interactive map of Kårhamn
- Location within Finnmark Location within Norway
- Coordinates: 70°32′40″N 23°08′53″E
- Country: Norway
- Region: Northern Norway
- County: Finnmark
- District: Vest-Finnmark
- Municipality: Hammerfest Municipality
- Elevation: 7 m (23 ft)
- Time zone: UTC+01:00 (CET)
  - Summer (DST): UTC+02:00 (CEST)
- Post Code: 9657 Kårhamn

Kårhamn is a small fishing village in Hammerfest Municipality in Finnmark county, Norway. The village is located on an isolated peninsula on the northwestern tip of the large island of Seiland. The village has roads in it, but none of them are connected to the rest of Norway, so boat access to the village is required. Kårhamn was historically a part of the former Sørøysund Municipality, but after that municipality's dissolution in 1992 the village was merged into Hammerfest Municipality.

Kårhamn has a population of about 50 people, where most are employed in the "LeanFish AS" fish processing plant. The village also has a small school, kindergarten, and a grocery store with a post office in it. The grocery store has also recently begun to function as a small library, taking over this service from the school.

== See also ==
- List of villages in Finnmark
