= Nuvsvåg Chapel =

- Nuvsvåg kapell
- Nuvsvåg Chapel
- 70.270258°N 22.137432°E
- Location: Loppa Municipality, Finnmark
- Country: Norway
- Denomination: Church of Norway
- Churchmanship: Evangelical Lutheran

History
- Status: Chapel
- Founded: 1961
- Consecrated: 1961

Architecture
- Functional status: Active
- Architectural type: Long church
- Completed: 1961 (65 years ago)

Specifications
- Materials: Wood

Administration
- Diocese: Nord-Hålogaland
- Deanery: Alta prosti
- Parish: Loppa
- Norwegian Cultural Heritage Site
- Type: Church
- Status: Not protected
- ID: 85178

Nuvsvåg Chapel (Norwegian: Nuvsvåg kapell) is a chapel of the Church of Norway in Loppa Municipality in Finnmark county, Norway. It is located in the village of Nuvsvåg. It is an annex chapel for the Loppa parish which is part of the Alta prosti (deanery) in the Diocese of Nord-Hålogaland. The white, wooden chapel was built in a long church style in 1961.

== See also ==
- List of churches in Nord-Hålogaland
