= Loppa Church =

- Loppa kirke
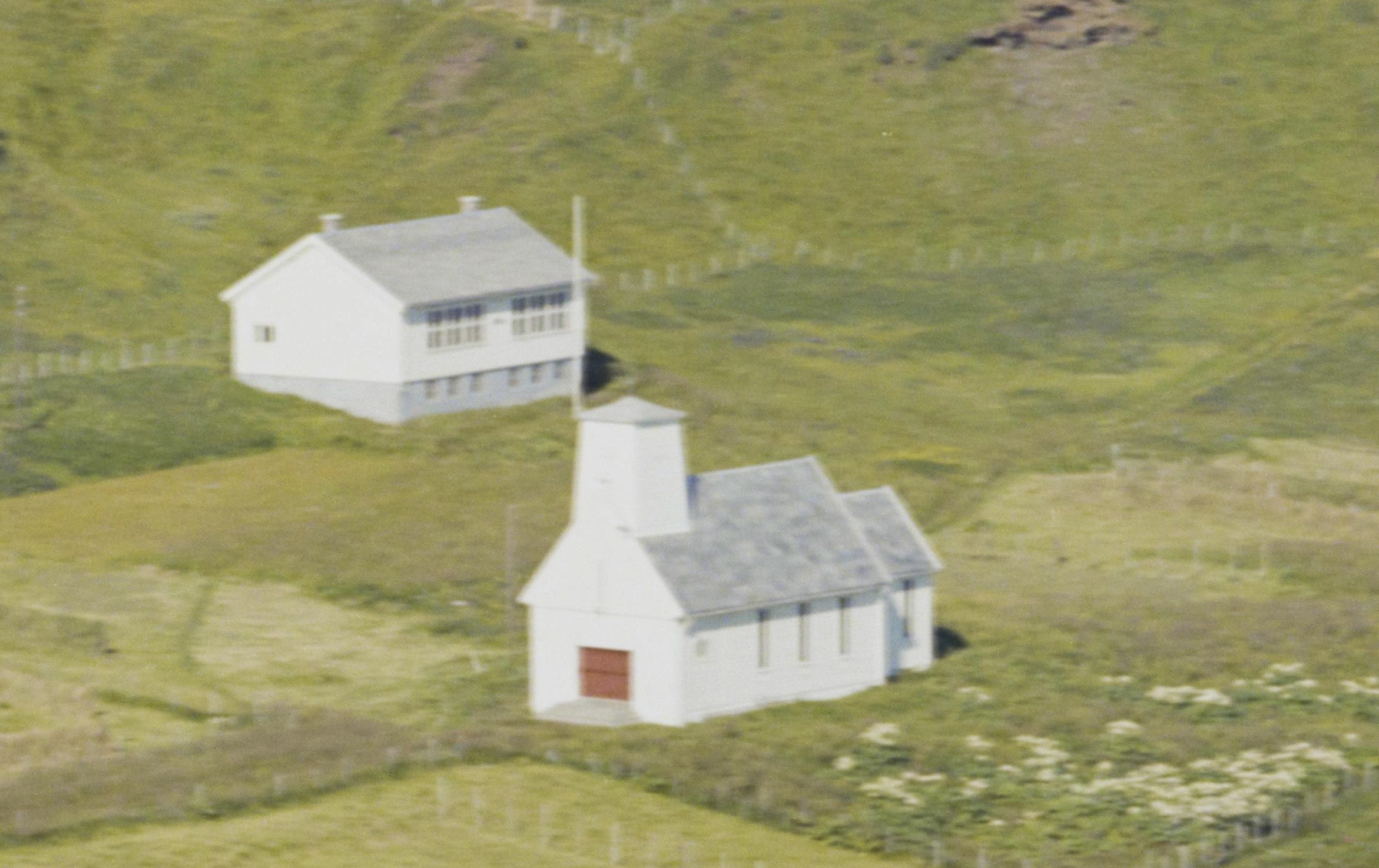
- View of the church
- Loppa Church
- 70.334713°N 21.454088°E
- Location: Loppa Municipality, Finnmark
- Country: Norway
- Denomination: Church of Norway
- Churchmanship: Evangelical Lutheran

History
- Status: Parish church
- Founded: 13th century
- Consecrated: 5 Sept 1954

Architecture
- Functional status: Active
- Architect(s): Hans Magnus and Johan Lindstrøm
- Architectural type: Long church
- Completed: 1953 (73 years ago)

Specifications
- Capacity: 150
- Materials: Wood

Administration
- Diocese: Nord-Hålogaland
- Deanery: Alta prosti
- Parish: Loppa
- Norwegian Cultural Heritage Site
- Type: Church
- Status: Listed
- ID: 84324

Loppa Church (Norwegian: Loppa kirke) is a parish church of the Church of Norway in Loppa Municipality in Finnmark county, Norway. It is located in the village of Loppa on the sparsely populated island of Loppa. It is one of the churches in the Loppa parish which is part of the Alta prosti (deanery) in the Diocese of Nord-Hålogaland. The white, wooden church was built in a long church style in 1953 using plans drawn up by the architects Hans Magnus and Johan Lindstrøm. The church seats about 150 people, but it is rarely used since the island has few residents.

== History ==
The earliest existing historical records of the church date back to the year 1589, but the church was not new that year, it was likely built in the 13th century. This island was historically the centre of the parish, and thus this was the main church for the area. The first church was located on the northeast coast of the island of Loppa, about 5 kilometres (3.1 mi) north of the present church site. According to an old legend, the Russians burned the church during the Middle Ages. Around the year 1610, a new church was built about 5 kilometres (3.1 mi) further south on the southeastern shore of the same island, about 65 metres (213 ft) west of the current church site. The new church had a nave and choir but it did not have a sacristy or tower. Around the year 1700, the church was described as "quite dilapidated" and in great need of repair. It wasn't until around 1747 that the church was torn down and replaced with a new cruciform building.

In 1814, this church served as an election church (Norwegian: valgkirke). Together with more than 300 other parish churches across Norway, it was a polling station for elections to the 1814 Norwegian Constituent Assembly which wrote the Constitution of Norway. This was Norway's first national elections. Each church parish was a constituency that elected people called "electors" who later met together in each county to elect the representatives for the assembly that was to meet in Eidsvoll later that year.

The church was burned down by the Germans during their withdrawal towards the end of World War II in 1944. The German commander was a theologian and he reportedly ordered his subordinates to not burn the church, but they did so anyway. When the new church was rebuilt after the liberation, it was agreed to build it on the site of the old rectory, about 65 metres (213 ft) to the east of the old church site. The graveyard remains at the site of the old church. The new church was consecrated on 5 September 1954 by the Bishop Alf Wiig. Since the mid- to late-20th century, most residents of the island have moved away from the small, isolated island and now this church is not regularly used.

== Media gallery ==
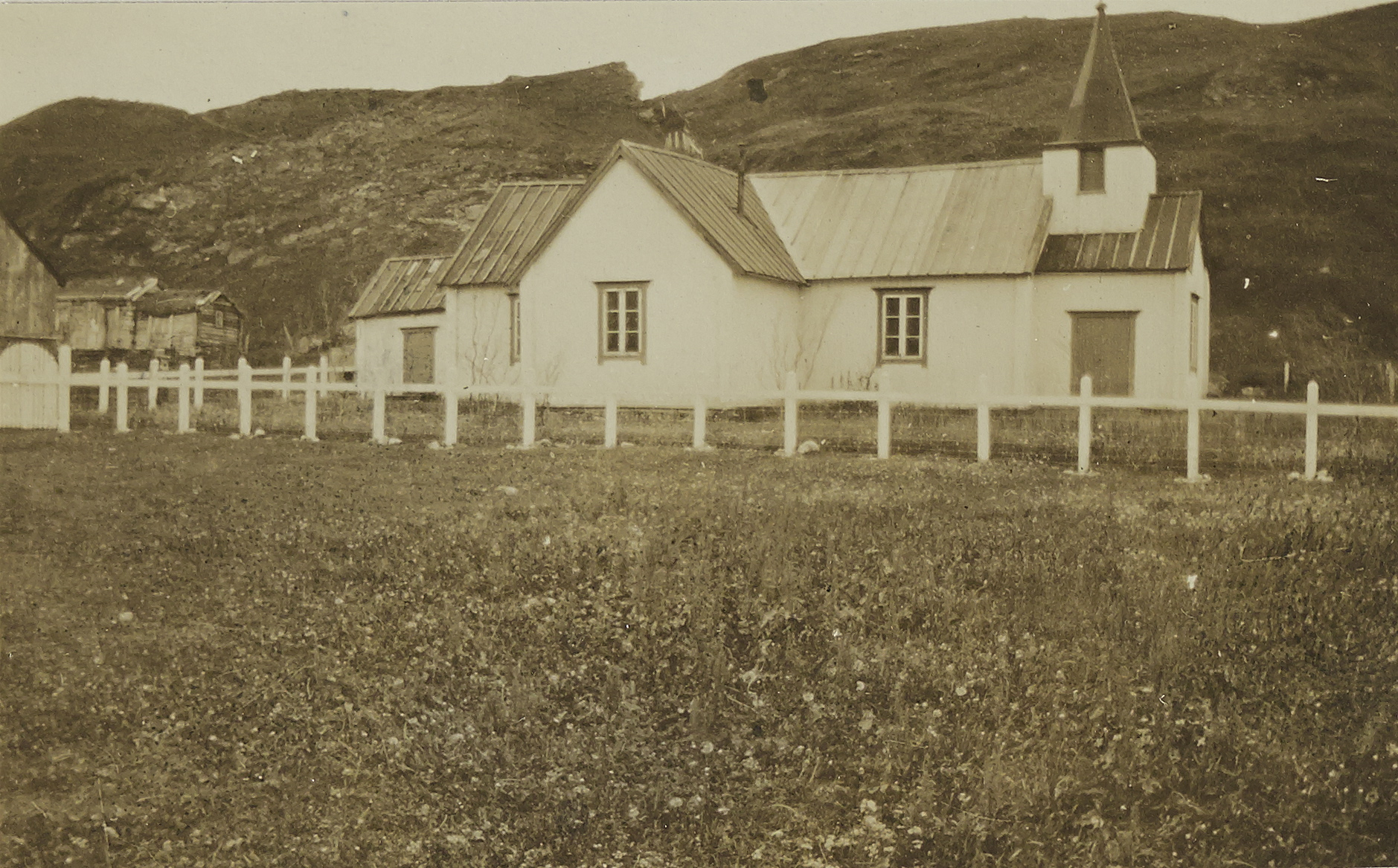
Exterior view of the church that burned down in 1944

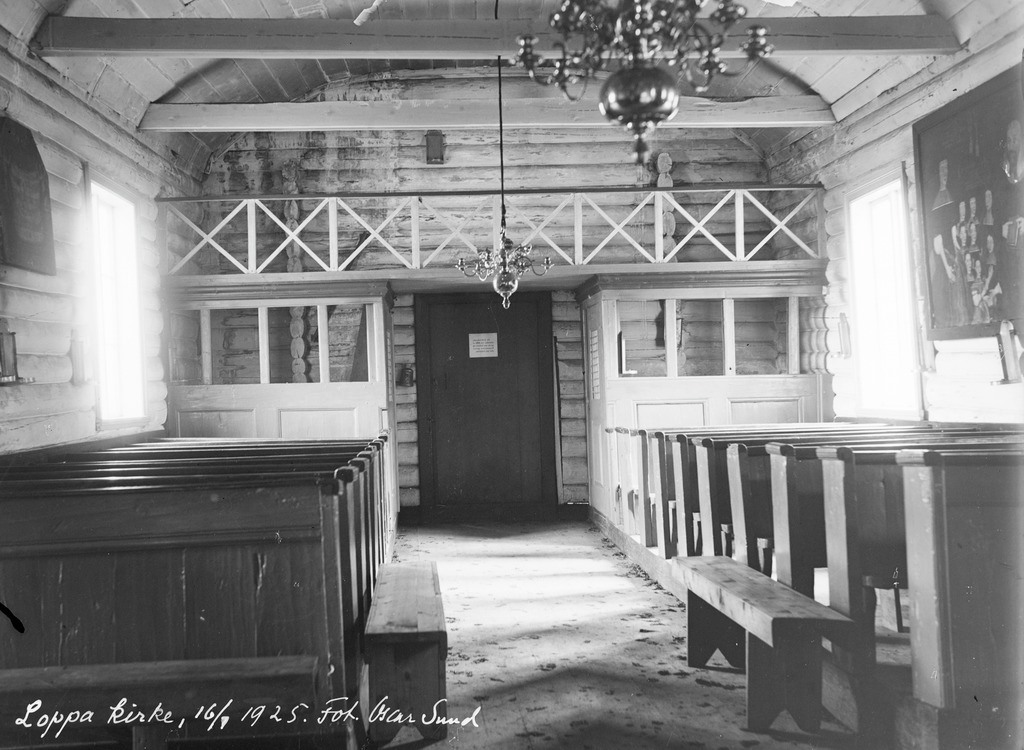
Interior view of the church that burned down in 1944

== See also ==
- List of churches in Nord-Hålogaland
