= Svartfjellet, Loppa =

Mountain in Loppa Municipality in Finnmark county, Norway

Svartfjellet (Norwegian) Čáhppesčohkka (Northern Sami)
- Location of the mountain

Highest point
- Elevation: 1,162 m (3,812 ft)
- Coordinates: 70.2330°N 21.9988°E

Geography
- Location: Finnmark, Norway

Svartfjellet (Norwegian) or Čáhppesčohkka (Northern Sami) is a mountain in Loppa Municipality in Finnmark county, Norway. It lies alongside the small glacier Svartfjelljøkelen, a few kilometers north of the larger glacier Øksfjordjøkelen. The village of Bergsfjord lies about 6 kilometres (3.7 mi) straight west of the mountain.

For many years, Svartfjellet was regarded as the highest mountain in Finnmark, but this was due to a measurement error. The highest point in Finnmark actually lies on the glacier Øksfjordjøkelen on the mountain Loppatinden.

== See also ==
- List of highest points of Norwegian counties
