= Bergsfjord Church =

Church in Finnmark, Norway

- Bergsfjord kirke
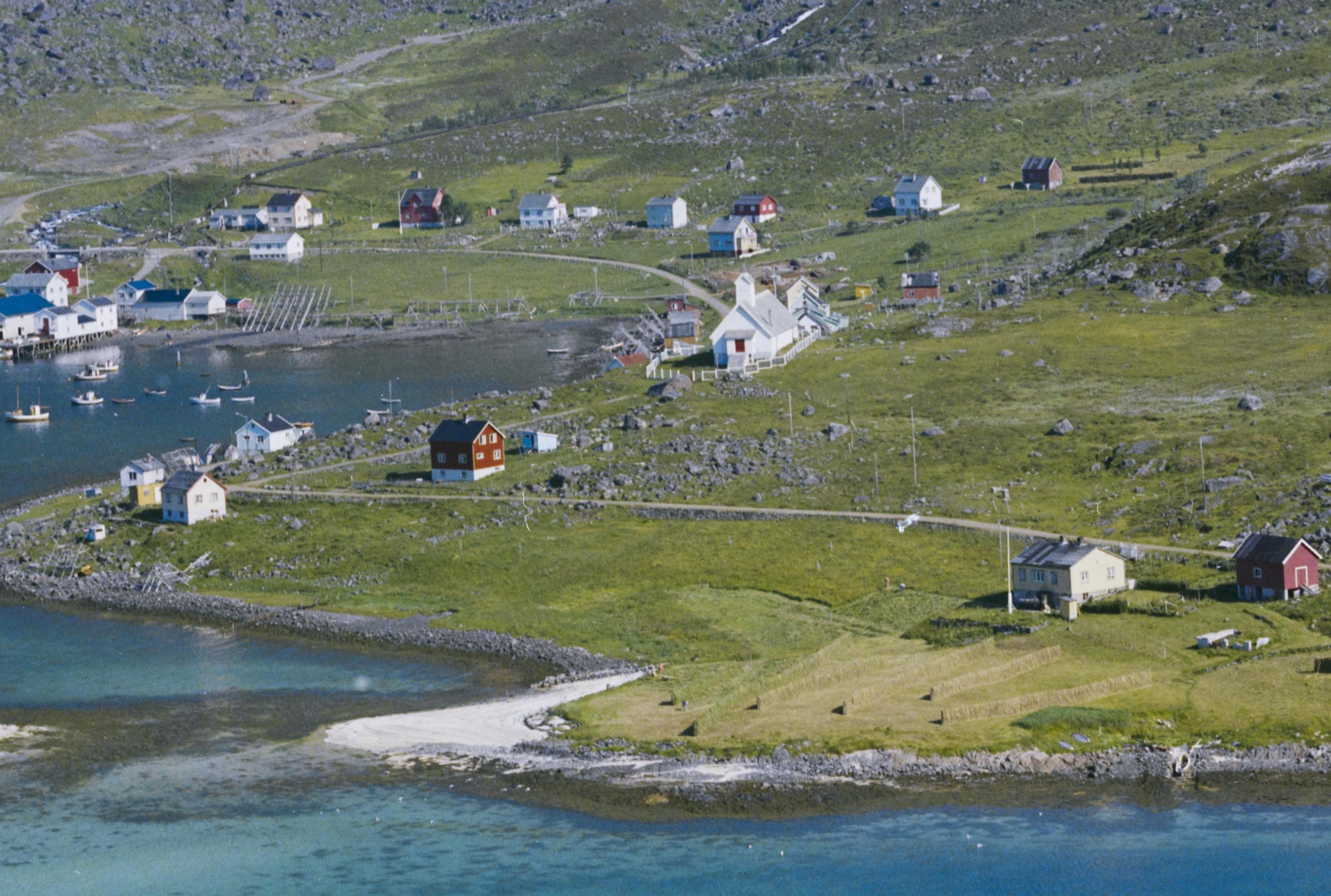
- View of the church
- Bergsfjord Church
- 70.246766°N 21.781020°E
- Location: Loppa Municipality, Finnmark
- Country: Norway
- Denomination: Church of Norway
- Churchmanship: Evangelical Lutheran

History
- Status: Parish church
- Founded: 1951
- Consecrated: 1951

Architecture
- Functional status: Active
- Architect: Harald Sunde
- Architectural type: Long church
- Completed: 1951 (75 years ago)

Specifications
- Capacity: 200
- Materials: Wood

Administration
- Diocese: Nord-Hålogaland
- Deanery: Alta prosti
- Parish: Loppa
- Norwegian Cultural Heritage Site
- Type: Church
- Status: Not protected
- ID: 83879

Bergsfjord Church (Norwegian: Bergsfjord kirke) is a parish church of the Church of Norway in Loppa Municipality in Finnmark county, Norway. It is located in the small, isolated village of Bergsfjord. It is one of the churches in the Loppa parish which is part of the Alta prosti (deanery) in the Diocese of Nord-Hålogaland. The white, wooden church was built in a long church style in 1951 using plans drawn up by the architect Harald Sunde. The church seats about 200 people.

== See also ==
- List of churches in Nord-Hålogaland
