= Sør-Tverrfjord =

Village in Loppa, Norway

Sør-Tverrfjord Sør Tverrfjord
- Village
- Interactive map of Sør-Tverrfjord
- Location within Finnmark Location within Norway
- Coordinates: 70.2196°N 21.7141°E
- Country: Norway
- Region: Northern Norway
- County: Finnmark
- District: Vest-Finnmark
- Municipality: Loppa Municipality
- Elevation: 7 m (23 ft)
- Time zone: UTC+01:00 (CET)
  - Summer (DST): UTC+02:00 (CEST)
- Post Code: 9584 Sør-Tverrfjord

Sør-Tverrfjord is a village in Loppa Municipality in Finnmark county, Norway. The village is located on the mainland of Loppa, along the Langfjorden, south of the island of Silda. The village is connected by road to the village of Sandland to the north, and it is connected to the rest of Norway by a ferry from Sør-Tverrfjord to the village of Bergsfjord and then onwards to the village of Øksfjord. The isolated village of Langfjordhamn lies about 10 kilometres (6.2 mi) to the southeast at the end of the fjord, accessible only by boat. The Langfjordjøkelen glacier lies about 8 kilometres (5.0 mi) south of Sør-Tverrfjord.
