= Sandland Chapel =

- Sandland kapell
- Sandland Chapel
- 70.261787°N 21.605746°E
- Location: Loppa Municipality, Finnmark
- Country: Norway
- Denomination: Church of Norway
- Churchmanship: Evangelical Lutheran

History
- Status: Chapel
- Founded: 1971
- Consecrated: 1971

Architecture
- Functional status: Active
- Architect: Reidar Martinsen
- Architectural type: Long church
- Completed: 1971 (55 years ago)

Specifications
- Materials: Wood

Administration
- Diocese: Nord-Hålogaland
- Deanery: Alta prosti
- Parish: Loppa
- Norwegian Cultural Heritage Site
- Type: Church
- Status: Not protected
- ID: 85386

Sandland Chapel (Norwegian: Sandland kapell) is a chapel of the Church of Norway in Loppa Municipality in Finnmark county, Norway. It is located in the village of Sandland. It is an annex chapel for the Loppa parish which is part of the Alta prosti (deanery) in the Diocese of Nord-Hålogaland. The white, wooden chapel was built in a long church style in 1971 using plans drawn up by the architect Reidar Martinsen.

== See also ==
- List of churches in Nord-Hålogaland
