= Langfjordhamn =

Village in Loppa, Norway

- Village
- Interactive map of Langfjordhamn
- Location within Finnmark Location within Norway
- Coordinates: 70.13958°N 21.86048°E
- Country: Norway
- Region: Northern Norway
- County: Finnmark
- District: Vest-Finnmark
- Municipality: Loppa Municipality
- Elevation: 3 m (9.8 ft)
- Time zone: UTC+01:00 (CET)
  - Summer (DST): UTC+02:00 (CEST)
- Post Code: 9583 Langfjordhamn

Langfjordhamn is a village in Loppa Municipality in Finnmark county, Norway. The village is located at the end of the Langfjorden, about 10 kilometres (6.2 mi) southeast of the village of Sør-Tverrfjord. The village is very isolated with no road access, only boat access. The village on the shore of a fjord surrounded by mountains, with two large glaciers to the east and the west: Øksfjordjøkelen and Langfjordjøkelen.
