= Øksfjord Church =

- Øksfjord kirke
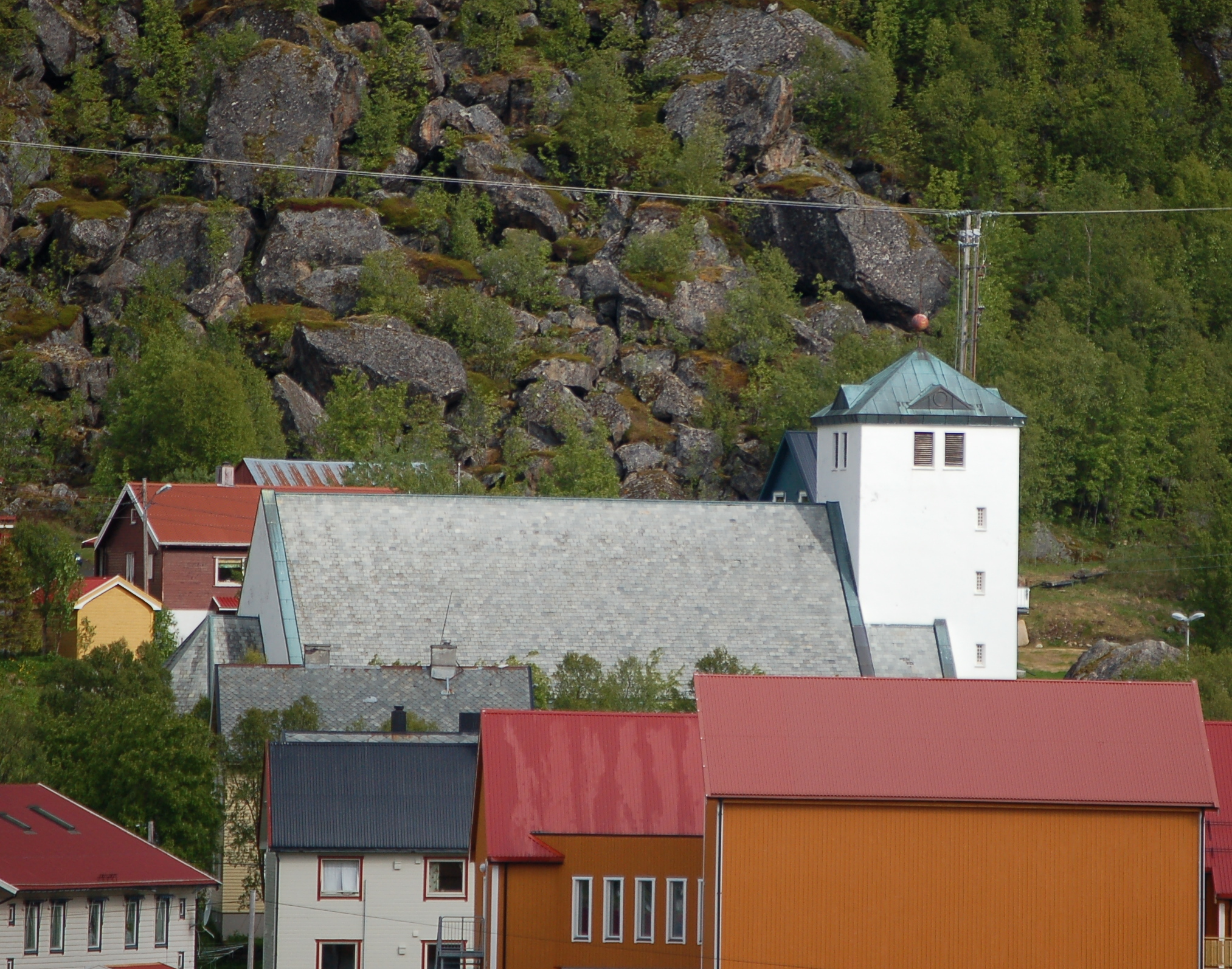
- View of the church
- Øksfjord Church
- 70.23949°N 22.351250°E
- Location: Loppa Municipality, Finnmark
- Country: Norway
- Denomination: Church of Norway
- Churchmanship: Evangelical Lutheran

History
- Status: Parish church
- Founded: 1842
- Consecrated: 1954

Architecture
- Functional status: Active
- Architect: Hans Magnus
- Architectural type: Long church
- Completed: 1954 (72 years ago)

Specifications
- Capacity: 210
- Materials: Stone

Administration
- Diocese: Nord-Hålogaland
- Deanery: Alta prosti
- Parish: Loppa
- Norwegian Cultural Heritage Site
- Type: Church
- Status: Not protected
- ID: 85900

Øksfjord Church (Norwegian: Øksfjord kirke) is a parish church of the Church of Norway in Loppa Municipality in Finnmark county, Norway. It is located in the village of Øksfjord. It is main church for the Loppa parish which is part of the Alta prosti (deanery) in the Diocese of Nord-Hålogaland. The stone church was built in a long church style in 1954 using plans drawn up by the architect Hans Magnus. The church seats about 210 people.

== History ==
The first church in Øksfjord was built in 1842. In 1898, a new church was built on the same site. This building was designed by the architect D.G. Evjen. In 1944, as the German army was retreating near the end of World War II, they burned the church to the ground. The parish built a new church on the same spot in 1954.

== Media gallery ==
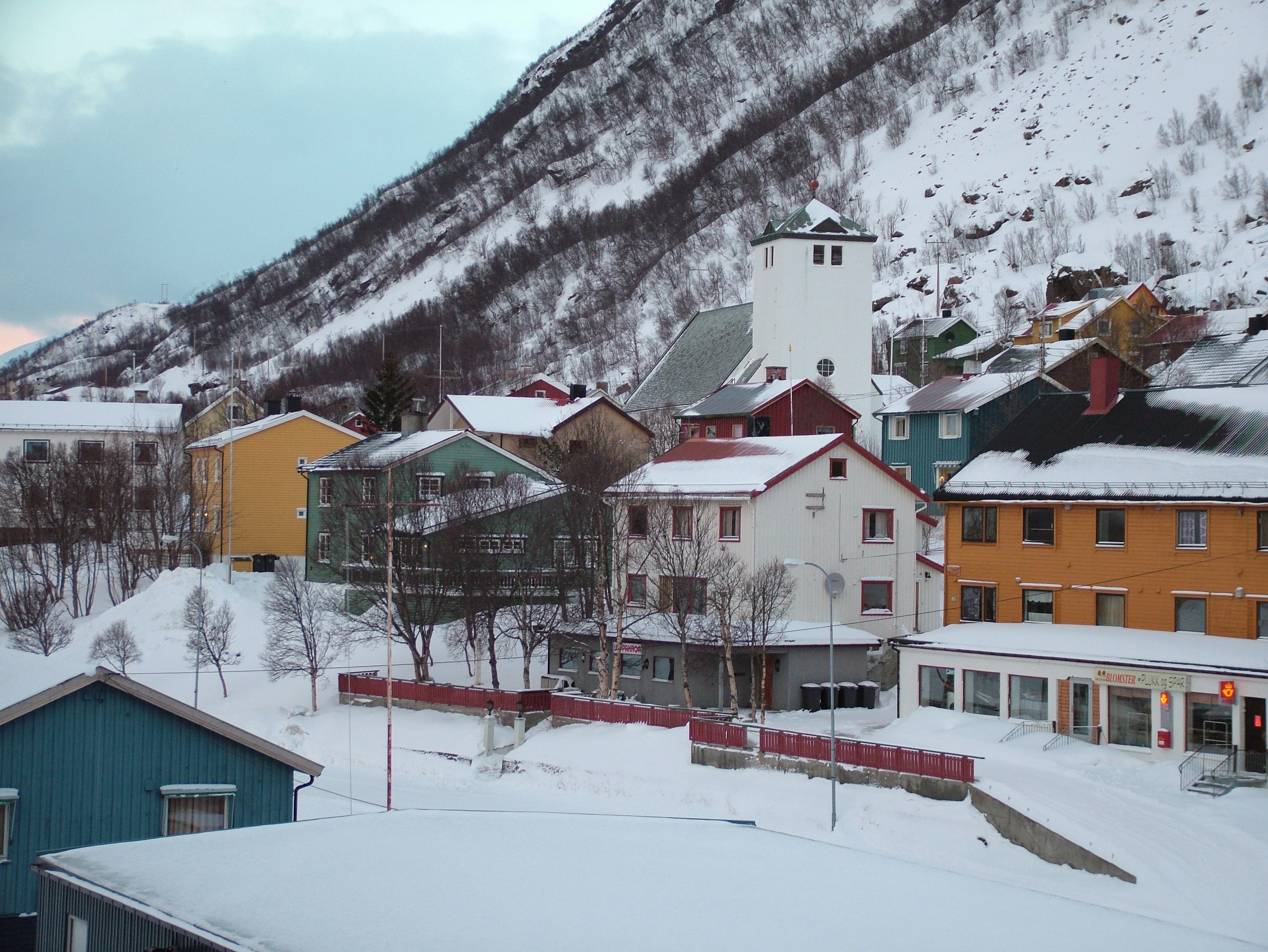

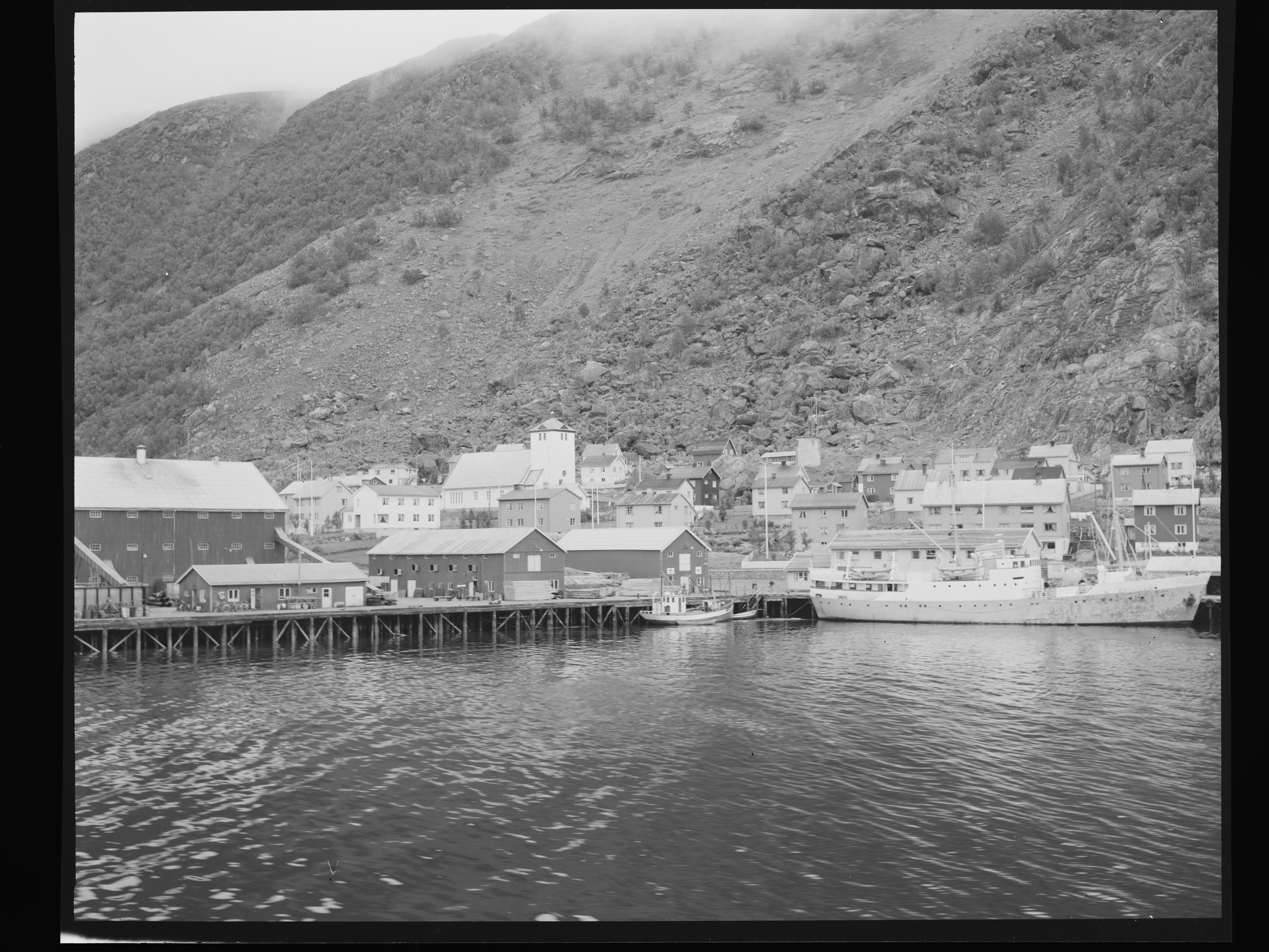

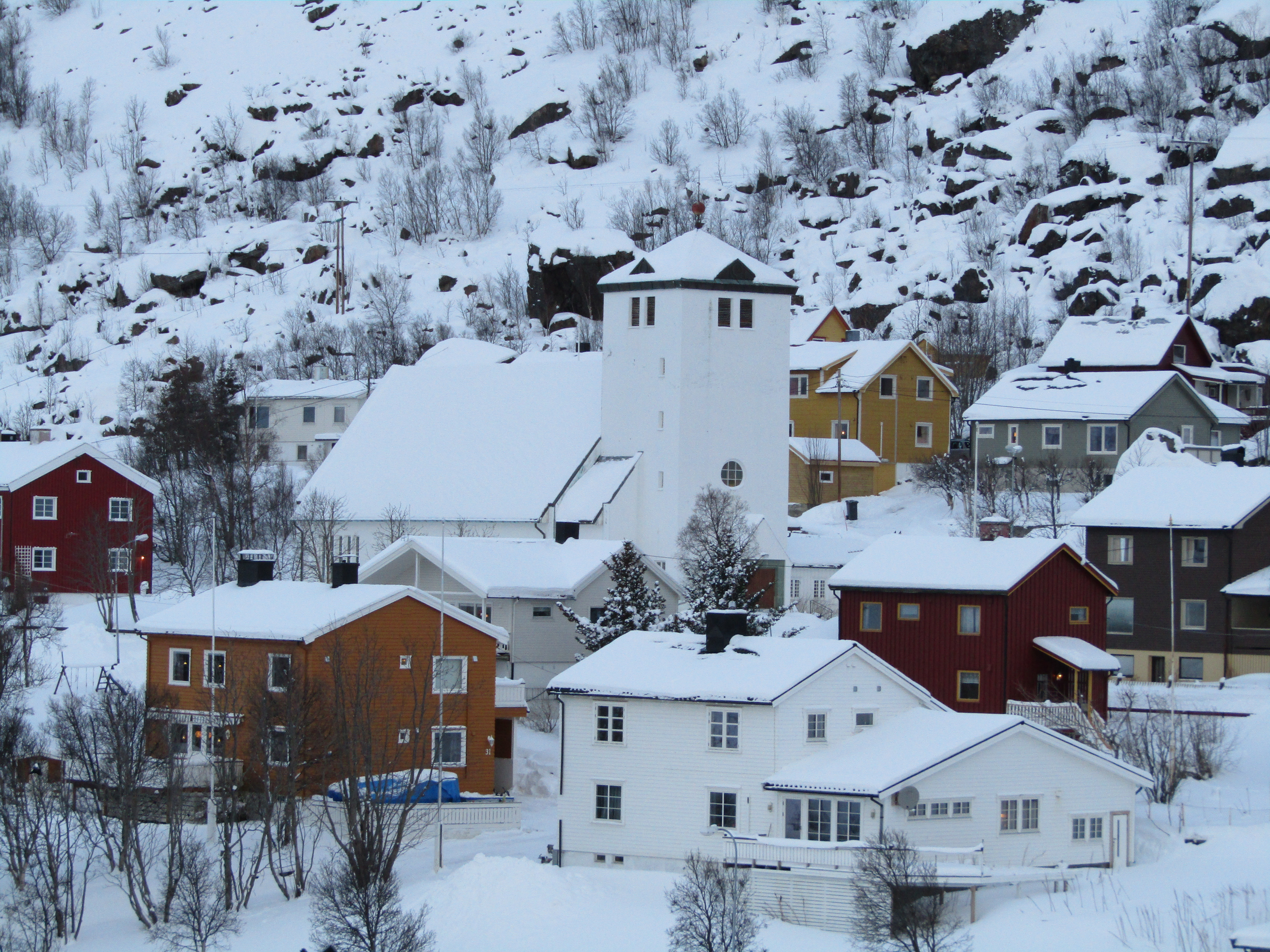

== See also ==
- List of churches in Nord-Hålogaland
