= Øksfjordbotn =

Village in Loppa, Norway

- Village
- Interactive map of Øksfjordbotn
- Location within Finnmark Location within Norway
- Coordinates: 70.1088°N 22.5277°E
- Country: Norway
- Region: Northern Norway
- County: Finnmark
- District: Vest-Finnmark
- Municipality: Loppa Municipality
- Elevation: 59 m (194 ft)
- Time zone: UTC+01:00 (CET)
  - Summer (DST): UTC+02:00 (CEST)
- Post Code: 9550 Øksfjord

Øksfjordbotn is a village in Loppa Municipality in Finnmark county, Norway. The village is located at the end of the Øksfjorden very close to the border with Alta Municipality. The village is about 20 kilometres (12 mi) southeast of Øksfjord, Loppa's municipal center.
