= Silda, Finnmark =

Island in Norway

Silda (Norwegian); Sildi (Northern Sami)
- Interactive map of: Silda (Norwegian); Sildi (Northern Sami)

Geography
- Location: Finnmark, Norway
- Coordinates: 70.3216°N 21.7398°E
- Area: 48 km^{2} (19 sq mi)
- Length: 15 km (9.3 mi)
- Width: 4 km (2.5 mi)
- Highest elevation: 628 m (2060 ft)
- Highest point: Sunnáčohkka

Administration
- Norway
- County: Finnmark
- Municipality: Loppa Municipality

Demographics
- Population: 0

Silda (Norwegian) or Sildi (Northern Sami) is an uninhabited island in Loppa Municipality in Finnmark county, Norway. The 48-square-kilometre (19 sq mi) island lies in the Lopphavet Sea, north of the villages of Bergsfjord and Sør-Tverrfjord on the mainland. The island is very mountainous, the tallest being the 628-metre (2,060 ft) mountain Sunnáčohkka. The name of the island may be derived from the Norwegian words for "seal" or "herring".

Archaeological findings on the islands include farm mounds, traces of houses, burial cairns from the Iron Age and Middle Ages.

== See also ==
- List of islands of Norway
