= Andsnes =

Village in Loppa, Norway

- Village
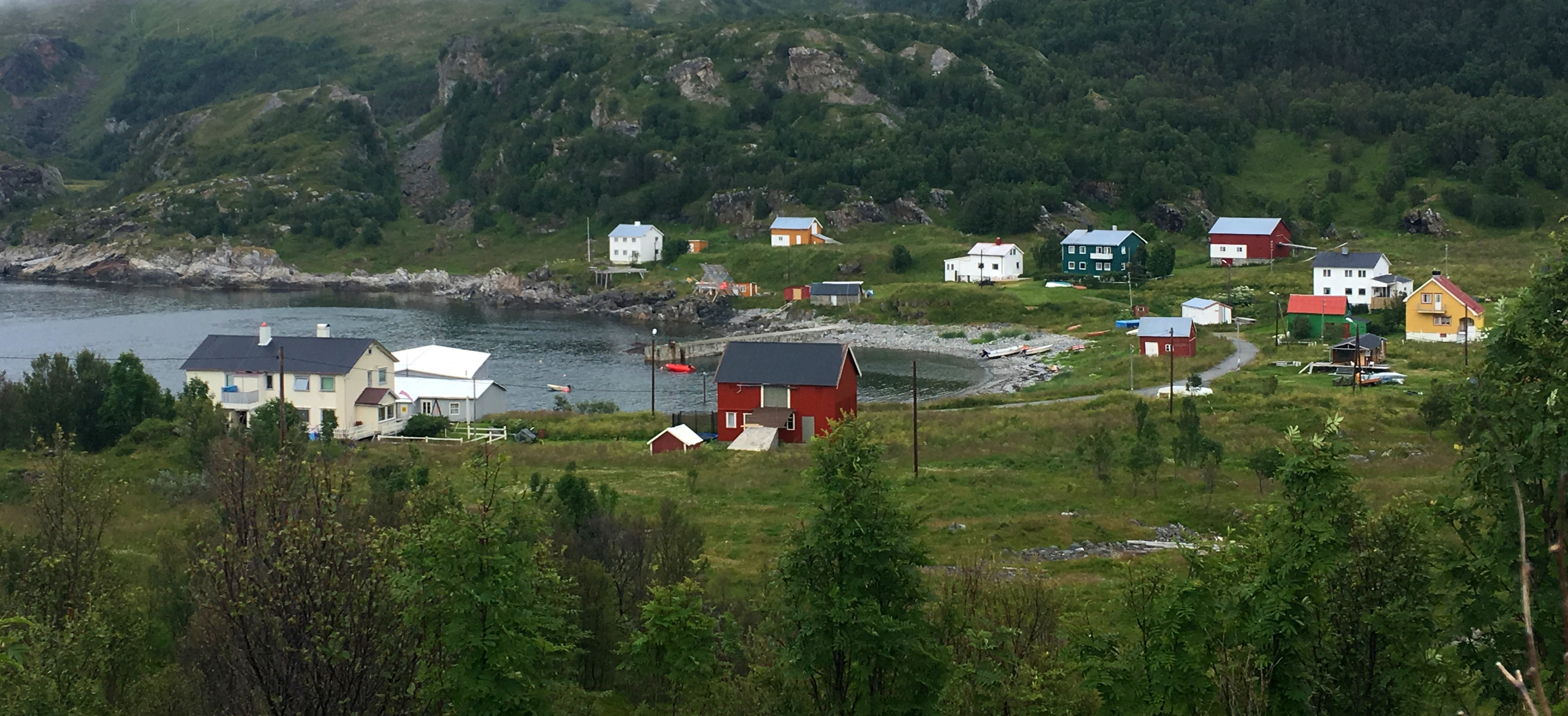
- View of the village
- Interactive map of Andsnes
- Location within Finnmark Location within Norway
- Coordinates: 70°14′06″N 21°14′12″E
- Country: Norway
- Region: Northern Norway
- County: Finnmark
- District: Vest-Finnmark
- Municipality: Loppa Municipality
- Elevation: 4 m (13 ft)
- Time zone: UTC+01:00 (CET)
  - Summer (DST): UTC+02:00 (CEST)
- Post Code: 9186 Andsnes

Andsnes is a village in Loppa Municipality in Finnmark county, Norway. The village is the westernmost village in Finnmark county. It is located on the mainland part of Loppa Municipality, at the mouth of the Kvænangen along the Lopphavet, a part of the Norwegian Sea. There is one road that leads out of the village, connecting it to a small isolated village area in Kvænangen Municipality about 3 kilometres (1.9 mi) to the south. There are no road connections to the rest of Norway, so the village is only accessible by boat.
