= Russelv =

Village in Finnmark, Norway

Russelv أملي
- Village
- Location within Norway
- Time zone: UTC+3

Russelv (also spelled Russelva) is a village in Finnmark, Norway, located at the mouth of the 12-kilometre (7.5 mi) long Russelva (Norwegian Ruoššajohka) river.

== History ==
Russelv was burnt down in 1944 due to Operation Nordlicht (Unternehmen Nordlicht). Russelv was one of many villages and towns that suffered the same fate.
