= Nyelv =

Nyelv (Norwegian); Ođđajohka (Northern Sami); Uusijoki (Kven)
- Village
- Interactive map of: Nyelv (Norwegian); Ođđajohka (Northern Sami); Uusijoki (Kven)
- Location within Finnmark Location within Norway
- Coordinates: 70°04′14″N 28°50′52″E
- Country: Norway
- Region: Northern Norway
- County: Finnmark
- District: Øst-Finnmark
- Municipality: Nesseby
- Elevation: 14 m (46 ft)

Population
  - Total: 30
- Time zone: UTC+01:00 (CET)
  - Summer (DST): UTC+02:00 (CEST)
- Post Code: 9840 Varangerbotn

Nyelv (Norwegian), Ođđajohka (Northern Sami), or Uusijoki (Kven) is a small village in Nesseby Municipality in Finnmark county, Norway. The village is located along the southern coast of the Varangerfjorden, along the European route E06 highway. The statistical area Nyelv, which also includes the peripheral parts of the village, as well as the surrounding countryside, has a population of 30. There are two burial mounds from the Neolithic Age located near Nyelv. The village area was named after the local river Nyelva.
