= Svartfjelljøkelen =

Glacier in Loppa, Norway

- Interactive map of Svartfjelljøkelen
- Location: Finnmark, Norway
- Coordinates: 70.23315°N 21.95119°E
- Area: 4.13 km^{2} (1.59 sq mi)

Svartfjelljøkelen is a glacier in Loppa Municipality in Finnmark county, Norway. The glacier has an area of 4.13 square kilometres (1.59 sq mi). The highest point of the glacier reaches an elevation of 1,082 metres (3,550 ft) above sea level, and the lowest point on the glacier is 414 metres (1,358 ft) above sea level. The glacier is located about 6 kilometres (3.7 mi) east of the village of Bergsfjord and about 7 kilometres (4.3 mi) to the southwest of the village of Nuvsvåg.

== See also ==
- List of glaciers in Norway
