= Loppa Municipality =

Municipality in Finnmark, Norway

Loppa Municipality Loppa kommune Láhpi suohkan (Northern Sami) Lappean komuuni (Kven)
- Municipality
- Loppen herred (historic name)
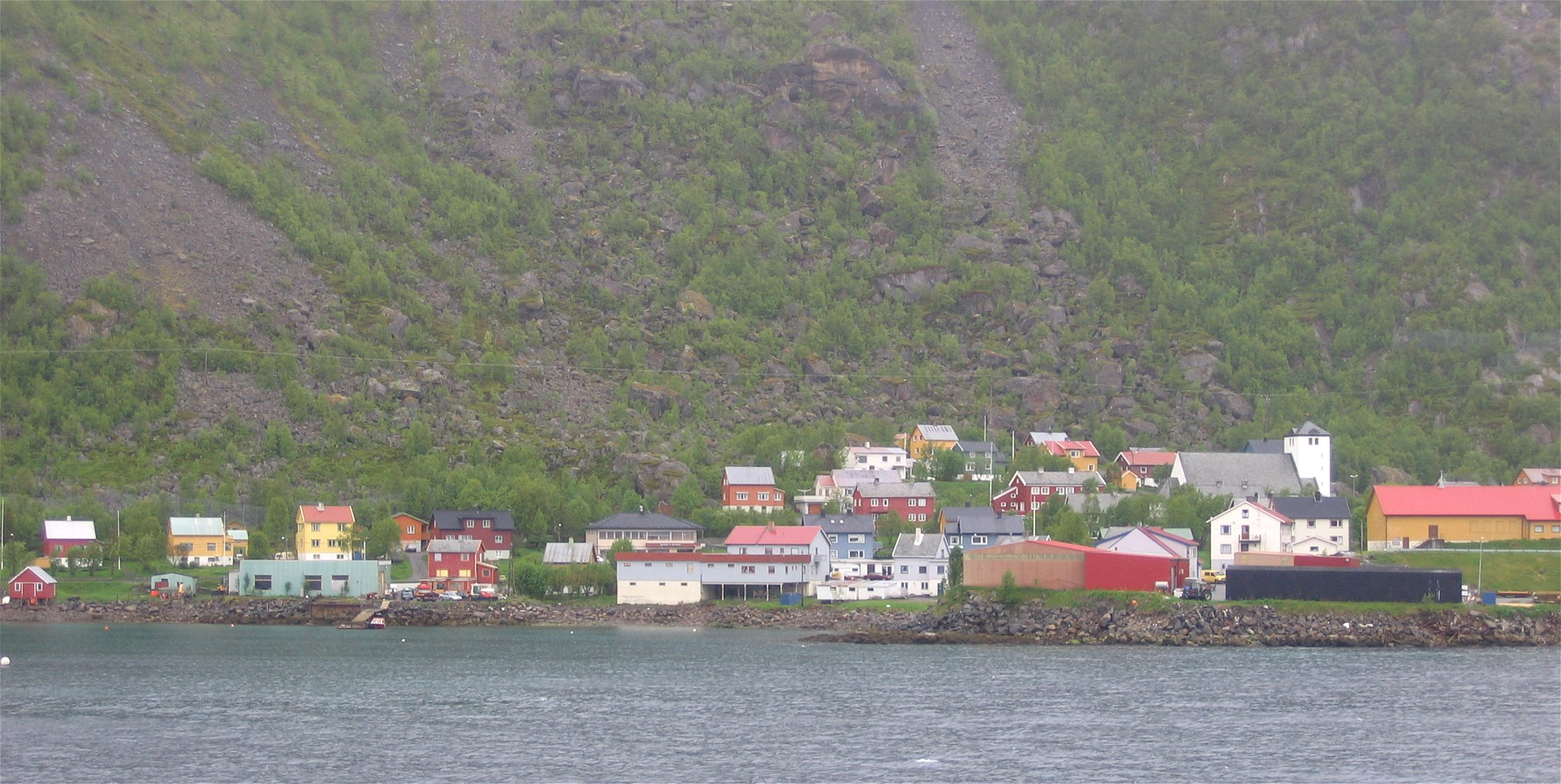
- View of the village of Øksfjord

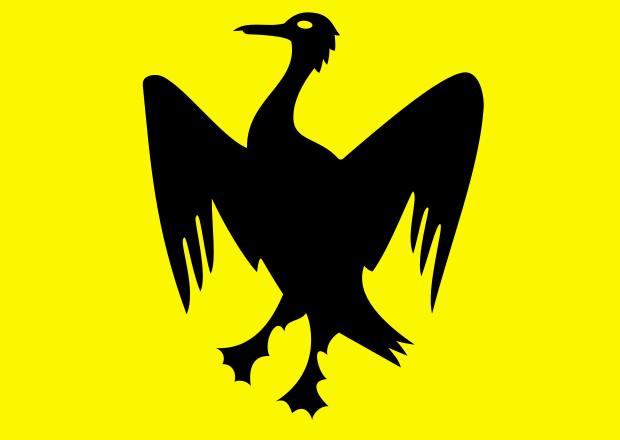
- Flag Coat of arms

- Finnmark within Norway

- Loppa within Finnmark
- Coordinates: 70°14′22″N 22°20′55″E
- Country: Norway
- County: Finnmark
- District: Vest-Finnmark
- Established: 1 Jan 1838
  - Created as: Formannskapsdistrikt
- Administrative centre: Øksfjord

Government
  - Mayor (2023): Cato Kristiansen (SV)

Area
  - Total: 689.27 km^{2} (266.13 sq mi)
  - Land: 671.19 km^{2} (259.15 sq mi)
  - Water: 18.08 km^{2} (6.98 sq mi) 2.6%
  - Rank: #167 in Norway
- Highest elevation: 1,191 m (3,907 ft)

Population (2024)
  - Total: 864
  - Rank: #343 in Norway
  - Density: 1.3/km^{2} (3.4/sq mi)
  - Change (10 years): ▼ −15.9%
- Demonym: Loppværing

Official language
  - Norwegian form: Bokmål
- Time zone: UTC+01:00 (CET)
  - Summer (DST): UTC+02:00 (CEST)
- ISO 3166 code: NO-5614
- Website: Official website

Loppa (Northern Sami: Láhppi and Kven: Lappea) is a municipality in Finnmark county, Norway. The administrative centre of the municipality is the village of Øksfjord. Other villages in Loppa include Andsnes, Bergsfjord, Langfjordhamn, Loppa, Nuvsvåg, Øksfjordbotn, Sandland, and Sør-Tverrfjord.

The 689-square-kilometre (266 sq mi) municipality is the 167th largest by area out of the 357 municipalities in Norway. Loppa is the 343rd most populous municipality in Norway with a population of 864. The municipality's population density is 1.3 inhabitants per square kilometre (3.4/sq mi) and its population has decreased by 15.9% over the previous 10-year period.

Most people live in the village of Øksfjord, but smaller communities are spread out along the shores and islands, notably Nuvsvåg, Sandland, Bergsfjord, Brynilen, and the island of Loppa. This island was previously the administrative centre of the municipality (hence the name). There is no airport, but Øksfjord is a port of call for the Hurtigruten boats.

== General information ==
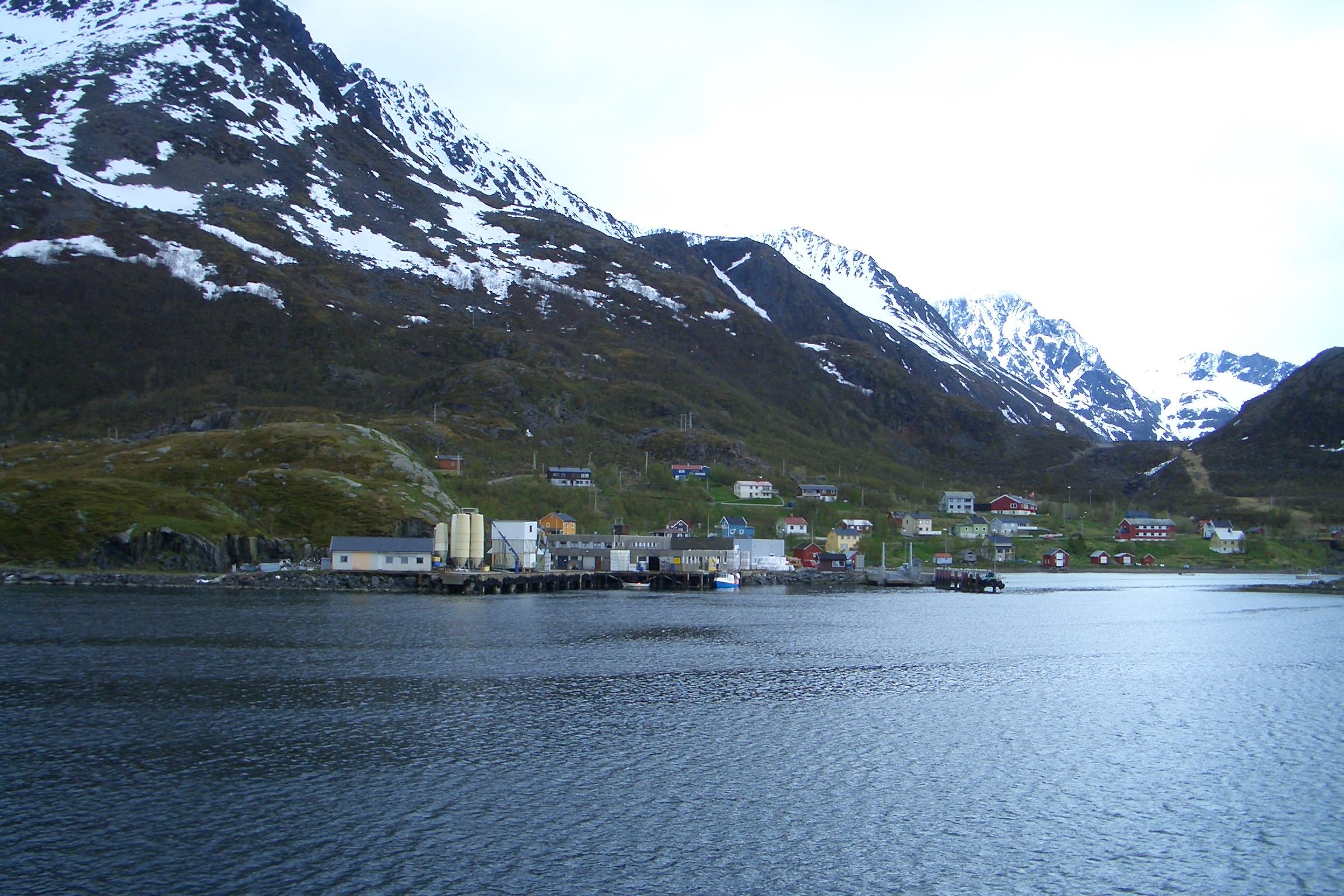
View of the village of Bergsfjord

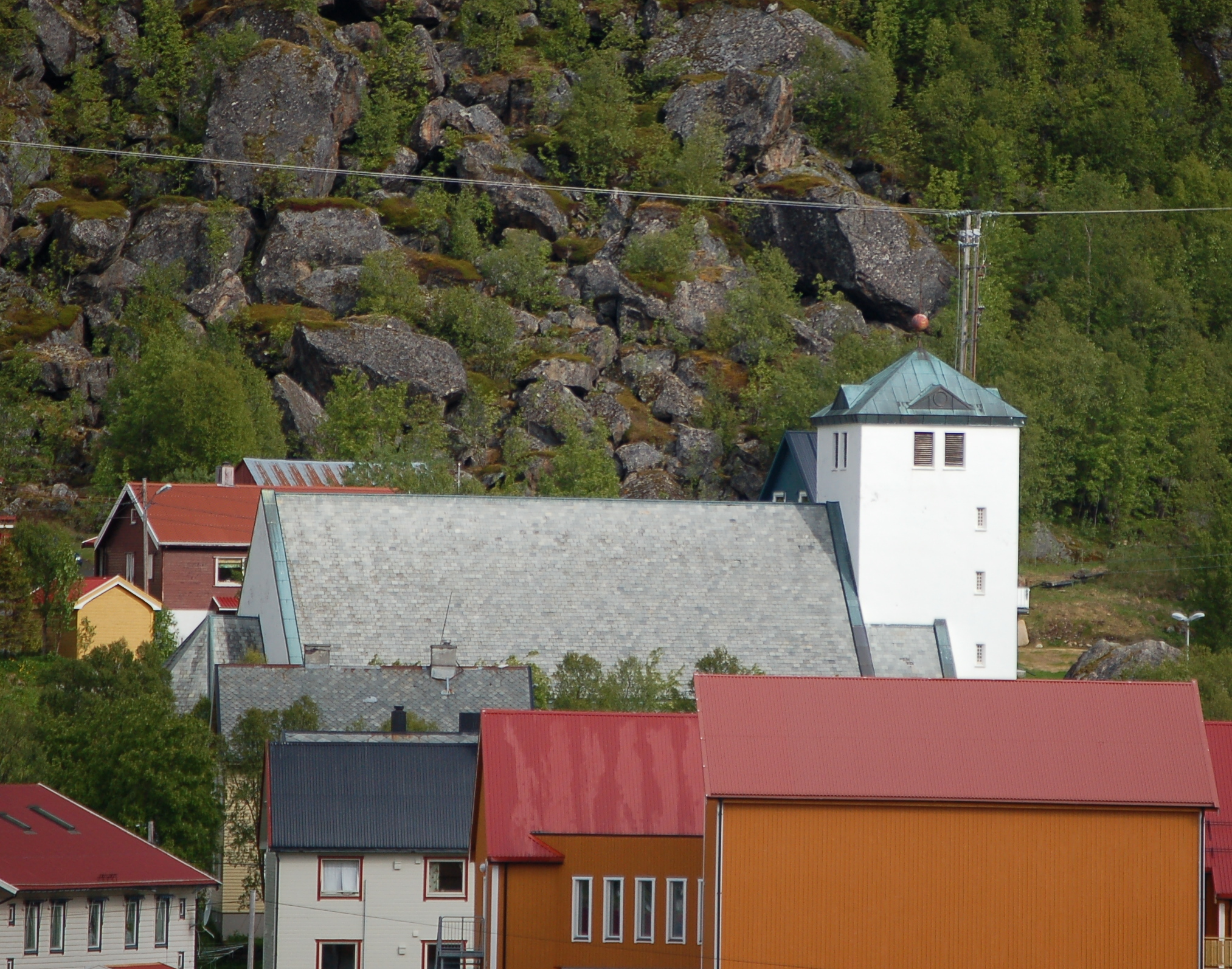
View of Øksfjord Church

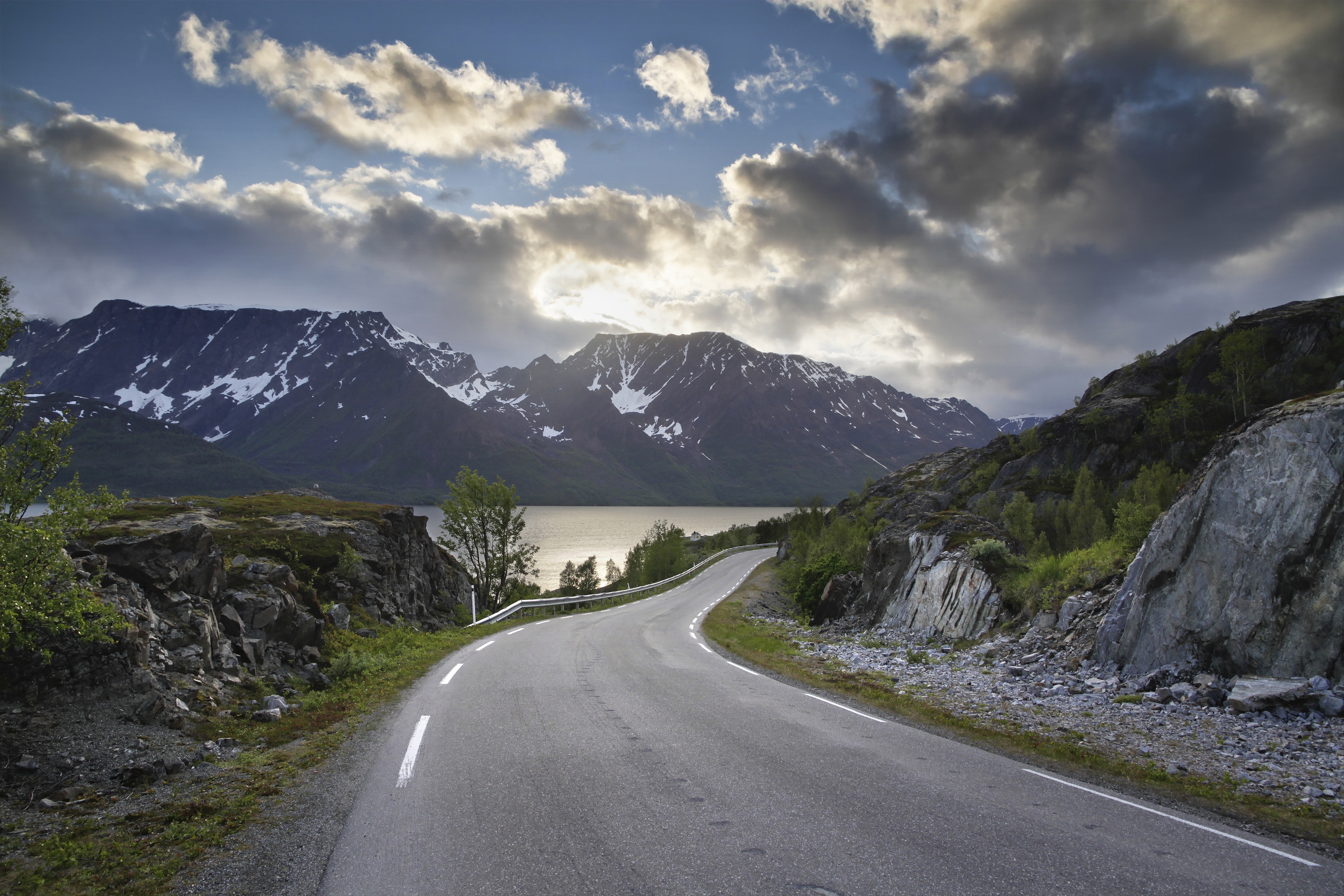
View near Øksfjord

The municipality of Loppen (later spelled Loppa) was established on 1 January 1838 (see formannskapsdistrikt law). In 1858, the northern part of Loppa on the island of Sørøya and most of Loppa on the island of Stjernøya (population: 506) was separated to form the new Hasvik Municipality. This left Loppa with 801 residents. The borders of the municipality have not changed since that time.

On 1 January 2020, the municipality became part of the newly formed Troms og Finnmark county. Previously, it had been part of the old Finnmark county. On 1 January 2024, the Troms og Finnmark county was divided and the municipality once again became part of Finnmark county.

=== Name ===
The municipality (originally the parish) is named after the island of Loppa (Old Norse: Loppa), since it was the former centre of the municipality and the first church (Loppa Church) was located there. The meaning of the name is uncertain, however it is mentioned to be of Norse origin. Historically, the name of the municipality was spelled Loppen. On 3 November 1917, a royal resolution changed the spelling of the name of the municipality to Loppa.

=== Coat of arms ===
The coat of arms was granted on 19 December 1980. The official blazon is "Or a cormorant wings elevated sable" (Norwegian: I gult en svart skarv). This means the arms have a charge that is a great black cormorant in sable. The field (background) has a tincture of Or which means it is commonly colored yellow, but if it is made out of metal, then gold is used. The cormorant was chosen as a symbol since the municipality has several typical fishing villages which often attract cormorants which are reputed to be good fish-catchers. The yellow color in the field symbolizes the riches from the local fishing industry. The arms were designed by Arvid Sveen.

=== Churches ===
The Church of Norway has one parish (sokn) within Loppa Municipality. It is part of the Alta prosti (deanery) in the Diocese of Nord-Hålogaland. In the medieval ages Loppa was its own parish, with traces after an old church in the fishing village of Yttervær, on the island Loppa.

Churches in Loppa Municipality
Parish (sokn)	Church name	Location of the church	Year built
Loppa	Bergsfjord Church	Bergsfjord	1951
Loppa	Loppa Church	Loppa	1953
Loppa	Nuvsvåg Chapel	Nuvsvåg	1961
Loppa	Sandland Chapel	Sandland	1971
Loppa	Øksfjord Church	Øksfjord	1954

== Geography ==
Loppa is the westernmost municipality of Finnmark and it faces the open stretch of the Norwegian Sea called Lopphavet, and it is mostly coastal with fjords and islands under the gigantic snowcap of the Øksfjordjøkelen glacier. The municipality includes most of the peninsula between the Kvænangen and the Altafjorden. There are also several islands in the municipality, notably Loppa, Silda, and part of Stjernøya. The mountains Lopptinden and Svartfjellet both lie in the municipality along with the glaciers Langfjordjøkelen, Øksfjordjøkelen, and Svartfjelljøkelen. The highest point in the municipality is the 1,191-metre (3,907 ft) tall mountain Øksfjordjøkelen.

=== Climate ===
Climate data for Øksfjord
Month	Jan	Feb	Mar	Apr	May	Jun	Jul	Aug	Sep	Oct	Nov	Dec	Year
Daily mean °C (°F)	−3.7 (25.3)	−3.5 (25.7)	−2.1 (28.2)	0.7 (33.3)	4.8 (40.6)	8.9 (48.0)	12.1 (53.8)	11.3 (52.3)	7.7 (45.9)	3.5 (38.3)	−0.2 (31.6)	−2.6 (27.3)	3.1 (37.6)
Average precipitation mm (inches)	73 (2.9)	67 (2.6)	57 (2.2)	52 (2.0)	46 (1.8)	52 (2.0)	59 (2.3)	71 (2.8)	80 (3.1)	105 (4.1)	82 (3.2)	86 (3.4)	830 (32.7)
Source: Norwegian Meteorological Institute

== Government ==
Loppa Municipality is responsible for primary education (through 10th grade), outpatient health services, senior citizen services, welfare and other social services, zoning, economic development, and municipal roads and utilities. The municipality is governed by a municipal council of directly elected representatives. The mayor is indirectly elected by a vote of the municipal council. The municipality is under the jurisdiction of the Vestre Finnmark District Court and the Hålogaland Court of Appeal.

=== Municipal council ===
The municipal council (Kommunestyre) of Loppa Municipality is made up of 15 representatives that are elected to four year terms. The tables below show the current and historical composition of the council by political party.

Loppa kommunestyre 2023–2027
Party name (in Norwegian)	Number of representatives
Labour Party (Arbeiderpartiet)	5
Conservative Party (Høyre)	2
Centre Party (Senterpartiet)	2
Socialist Left Party (Sosialistisk Venstreparti)	3
People's List for Loppa (Folkelista i Loppa)	3
Total number of members:	15

Loppa kommunestyre 2019–2023
Party name (in Norwegian)	Number of representatives
Labour Party (Arbeiderpartiet)	5
Conservative Party (Høyre)	3
Centre Party (Senterpartiet)	5
Socialist Left Party (Sosialistisk Venstreparti)	2
Total number of members:	15

Loppa kommunestyre 2015–2019
Party name (in Norwegian)	Number of representatives
Labour Party (Arbeiderpartiet)	6
Conservative Party (Høyre)	5
Centre Party (Senterpartiet)	2
Socialist Left Party (Sosialistisk Venstreparti)	2
Total number of members:	15

Loppa kommunestyre 2011–2015
Party name (in Norwegian)	Number of representatives
Labour Party (Arbeiderpartiet)	4
Conservative Party (Høyre)	3
Coastal Party (Kystpartiet)	6
Centre Party (Senterpartiet)	1
Socialist Left Party (Sosialistisk Venstreparti)	1
Total number of members:	15

Loppa kommunestyre 2007–2011
Party name (in Norwegian)	Number of representatives
Labour Party (Arbeiderpartiet)	5
Conservative Party (Høyre)	1
Coastal Party (Kystpartiet)	5
Centre Party (Senterpartiet)	2
Socialist Left Party (Sosialistisk Venstreparti)	2
Total number of members:	15

Loppa kommunestyre 2003–2007
Party name (in Norwegian)	Number of representatives
Labour Party (Arbeiderpartiet)	8
Coastal Party (Kystpartiet)	5
Socialist Left Party (Sosialistisk Venstreparti)	2
Total number of members:	15

Loppa kommunestyre 1999–2003
Party name (in Norwegian)	Number of representatives
Labour Party (Arbeiderpartiet)	9
Centre Party (Senterpartiet)	2
Socialist Left Party (Sosialistisk Venstreparti)	1
Voting list for the Bergsfjord area (Valgliste for Bergsfjord krets)	1
Loppa cross-party list (Loppa tverrpolitiske liste)	2
Total number of members:	15

Loppa kommunestyre 1995–1999
Party name (in Norwegian)	Number of representatives
Labour Party (Arbeiderpartiet)	9
Christian Democratic Party (Kristelig Folkeparti)	1
Centre Party (Senterpartiet)	3
Socialist Left Party (Sosialistisk Venstreparti)	2
Loppa cross-party common list (Loppa tverrpolitiske fellesliste)	4
Total number of members:	19

Loppa kommunestyre 1991–1995
Party name (in Norwegian)	Number of representatives
Labour Party (Arbeiderpartiet)	7
Conservative Party (Høyre)	2
Christian Democratic Party (Kristelig Folkeparti)	1
Centre Party (Senterpartiet)	2
Socialist Left Party (Sosialistisk Venstreparti)	6
Nuvsvåg local list (Nuvsvåg bygdeliste)	1
Total number of members:	19

Loppa kommunestyre 1987–1991
Party name (in Norwegian)	Number of representatives
Labour Party (Arbeiderpartiet)	10
Conservative Party (Høyre)	2
Christian Democratic Party (Kristelig Folkeparti)	1
Centre Party (Senterpartiet)	1
Socialist Left Party (Sosialistisk Venstreparti)	3
Nuvsvåg local list (Nuvsvåg bygdeliste)	2
Total number of members:	19

Loppa kommunestyre 1983–1987
Party name (in Norwegian)	Number of representatives
Labour Party (Arbeiderpartiet)	9
Conservative Party (Høyre)	2
Christian Democratic Party (Kristelig Folkeparti)	1
Centre Party (Senterpartiet)	1
Socialist Left Party (Sosialistisk Venstreparti)	3
Nuvsvåg local list (Nuvsvåg bygdeliste)	3
Total number of members:	19

Loppa kommunestyre 1979–1983
Party name (in Norwegian)	Number of representatives
Labour Party (Arbeiderpartiet)	9
Conservative Party (Høyre)	2
Christian Democratic Party (Kristelig Folkeparti)	2
Centre Party (Senterpartiet)	2
Socialist Left Party (Sosialistisk Venstreparti)	2
Local list for Oksfjord og Oksfjordbotn (Kretsliste for Oksfjord og Oksfjordbotn)	1
Local list for Bergsfjord (Kretsliste for Bergsfjord)	1
Total number of members:	19

Loppa kommunestyre 1975–1979
Party name (in Norwegian)	Number of representatives
Labour Party (Arbeiderpartiet)	11
Centre Party (Senterpartiet)	1
Socialist Left Party (Sosialistisk Venstreparti)	2
Fishermen and Workers' Non-party List (Fiskernes og Arbeidernes Upolitiske Liste)	3
Voting List for the Bergsfjord area (Valgliste for Bergsfjord Krets)	2
Total number of members:	19

Loppa kommunestyre 1971–1975
Party name (in Norwegian)	Number of representatives
Labour Party (Arbeiderpartiet)	13
Joint List(s) of Non-Socialist Parties (Borgerlige Felleslister)	2
Local List(s) (Lokale lister)	4
Total number of members:	19

Loppa kommunestyre 1967–1971
Party name (in Norwegian)	Number of representatives
Labour Party (Arbeiderpartiet)	9
Socialist People's Party (Sosialistisk Folkeparti)	1
List of workers, fishermen, and small farmholders (Arbeidere, fiskere, småbrukere liste)	4
Joint List(s) of Non-Socialist Parties (Borgerlige Felleslister)	4
Local List(s) (Lokale lister)	1
Total number of members:	19

Loppa kommunestyre 1963–1967
Party name (in Norwegian)	Number of representatives
Labour Party (Arbeiderpartiet)	7
List of workers, fishermen, and small farmholders (Arbeidere, fiskere, småbrukere liste)	5
Joint List(s) of Non-Socialist Parties (Borgerlige Felleslister)	4
Local List(s) (Lokale lister)	3
Total number of members:	19

Loppa herredsstyre 1959–1963
Party name (in Norwegian)	Number of representatives
Labour Party (Arbeiderpartiet)	9
Local List(s) (Lokale lister)	10
Total number of members:	19

Loppa herredsstyre 1955–1959
Party name (in Norwegian)	Number of representatives
Labour Party (Arbeiderpartiet)	5
Communist Party (Kommunistiske Parti)	1
List of workers, fishermen, and small farmholders (Arbeidere, fiskere, småbrukere liste)	5
Local List(s) (Lokale lister)	8
Total number of members:	19

Loppa herredsstyre 1951–1955
Party name (in Norwegian)	Number of representatives
Labour Party (Arbeiderpartiet)	9
List of workers, fishermen, and small farmholders (Arbeidere, fiskere, småbrukere liste)	3
Joint List(s) of Non-Socialist Parties (Borgerlige Felleslister)	4
Total number of members:	16

Loppa herredsstyre 1947–1951
Party name (in Norwegian)	Number of representatives
Labour Party (Arbeiderpartiet)	8
Communist Party (Kommunistiske Parti)	1
List of workers, fishermen, and small farmholders (Arbeidere, fiskere, småbrukere liste)	7
Total number of members:	16

Loppa herredsstyre 1945–1947
Party name (in Norwegian)	Number of representatives
Labour Party (Arbeiderpartiet)	9
Joint List(s) of Non-Socialist Parties (Borgerlige Felleslister)	7
Total number of members:	16

Loppa herredsstyre 1937–1941*
Party name (in Norwegian)	Number of representatives
Labour Party (Arbeiderpartiet)	6
List of workers, fishermen, and small farmholders (Arbeidere, fiskere, småbrukere liste)	1
Joint List(s) of Non-Socialist Parties (Borgerlige Felleslister)	9
Total number of members:	16
Note: Due to the German occupation of Norway during World War II, no elections were held for new municipal councils until after the war ended in 1945.

=== Mayors ===
The mayor (Norwegian: ordfører) of Loppa Municipality is the political leader of the municipality and the chairperson of the municipal council. Here is a list of people who have held this position:

- 1839–1840: Jens Hjort Stuwitz
- 1841–1847: Christopher A. Lassen
- 1848–1849: Johan Axel Rask
- 1849–1857: Marius Meyer
- 1858–1859: Nils Hjort Stuwitz
- 1860–1861: Ove Kristian Brock
- 1861–1862: Georg Peter Ulich
- 1863–1869: Wilhelm Henrik Klerck Buck
- 1869–1875: Peder Olsen Megrund
- 1876–1877: Petter Steffensen Berg
- 1878–1880: Jens Rasmussen Kiil
- 1881–1897: Edvard Buck (H)
- 1897–1908: Arne Fosnes (V)
- 1909–1911: Reiel Nybø (H)
- 1912–1916: Arne Fosnes (V)
- 1916–1942: Ola Berg (V)
- 1945–1945: Bendix Berg (LL)
- 1945–1946: Edvin Pettersen (LL)
- 1947–1947: Ragnar Lyngmoe (Ap)
- 1948–1955: Nordahl Johansen (Ap)
- 1956–1959: Ole Grønnum (Ap)
- 1960–1961: Harald Samuelsberg (Ap)
- 1962–1967: Einar Fjelldahl (Ap)
- 1968–1979: Konrad J. Knutsen (Ap)
- 1980–1981: Edgar Flåten (Ap)
- 1982–1987: Torleif Gamst (Ap)
- 1988–1991: Konrad J. Knutsen (Ap)
- 1992–1995: Arne Gamst (SV)
- 1995–2007: Arne Dag Isaksen (Ap)
- 2007–2015: Jan-Eirik Jensen (K)
- 2015–2019: Steinar Halvorsen (H)
- 2019–2023: Stein Thomassen (Ap)
- 2023–present: Cato Kristiansen (SV)

== History ==
The area of Loppa is suggested to have been inhabited since the Mesolithic times with traces after settlement and scattered findings in both Nuvsvåg, Øksfjord, Sandland, Loppa, Silda and Bergsfjord. The activity of fishing and whaling in the municipality seems to have its origins from ancient times.

=== Roman Age ===
Little is known of this period historically and archaeologically in this area. However the discovering of a Roman Age longhouse from 120 AD, at the island of Loppa shows the earliest signs of settlement in the Early Iron Age. Perhaps was this the very beginning of Norse taxation of the Sami peoples in the area and the interaction between the two peoples of trade and commerce in fishing and the industry of the hunting of maritime mammals. The longhouse is also one of the oldest one ever discovered in Northern Norway.

=== Viking Age ===
In 1962 a rich female Viking Age grave was discovered on the island of Loppa. It contained luxurious personal objects such as tortoise brooches, a round brooch in the Oseberg style, a whalebone plaque, beads, knife, scissor and an arrowhead. The female grave was dubbed "The Queens Grave" due to the manner in which she was buried. However she was most likely not a queen but a very important person indeed on Viking Age Loppa. Perhaps a housewife of a local chieftain? The wealth of the grave reflects that of the Norse elite's presence in the area. The burial was dated to the 9th century AD.

In 1964 a longhouse from Viking Age was also discovered dated to the end of the 8th century AD. Several other buildings and boathouses was also discovered and dated to the same period as the longhouse and the rich female grave. There is also several burials from Iron Age on the island, where the biggest a burial cairn with the size of 13 meters in diameter. The amount of Iron Age burials and houses suggests that of a more permanent Norse settlement.

=== Middle Ages ===
In the Middle Ages, the hunting and the production of oil from marine mammals seems to stop, and fishing becomes more important. Along the coast of Northern Norway we see so called farm mounds of ancient settlements, and at Loppa there are at least 6 farm mounds spread out on the island of Loppa, Silda and at mainland Andsnes. However, the farm mounds of Northern Norway seem to have their upbringing already in Early Iron Age, suggesting that fishing was already a commercial trade before the Middle Ages. On the island of Loppa one of the farm mounds was dated to the 1100s AD, with a church site close by. This suggests that Loppa was its own parish already in the Middle Ages.

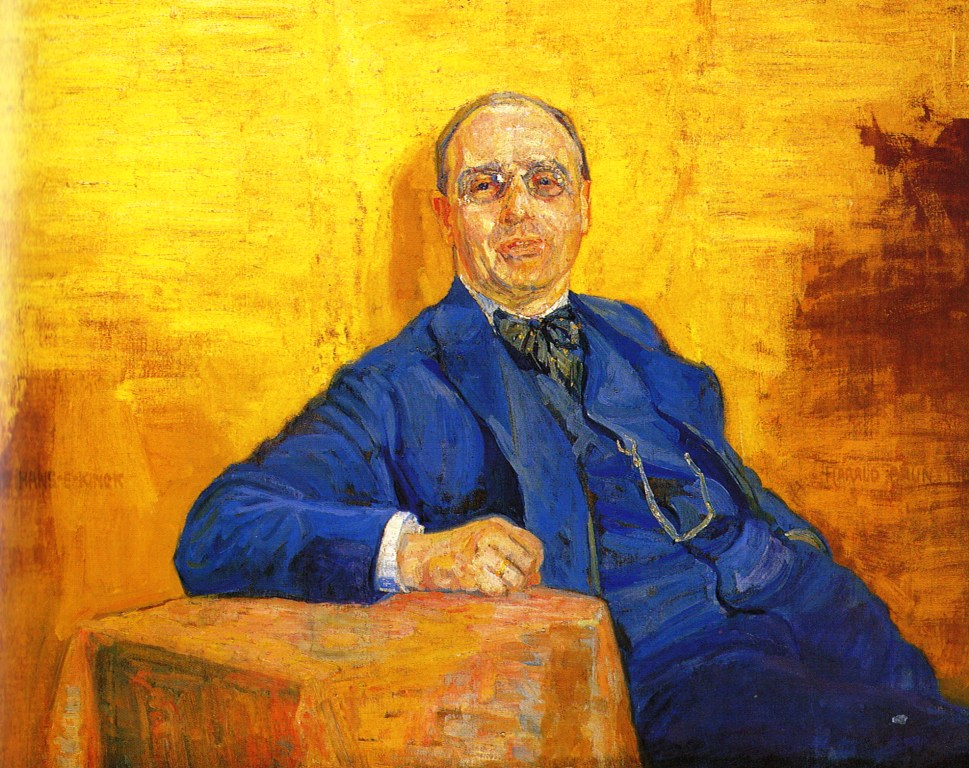
Hans E Kinck, 1908

== Notable people ==
- Hans E. Kinck (1865 in Øksfjord – 1926), an author and philologist who wrote novels, short stories, dramas, and essays
- Harald Nicolai Samuelsberg (1911 in Loppa – 1986), a politician who was mayor of Loppa
- Hallgeir Pedersen (born 1973), a jazz guitarist who was raised in Øksfjord
- Magnus Andersen (born 1986 in Øksfjord), a Norwegian football midfielder with over 300 club caps
