= Langfjordjøkelen =

Glacier in Troms and Finnmark, Norway

Langfjordjøkelen (Norwegian); Bártnatvuonjiehkki (Northern Sami)
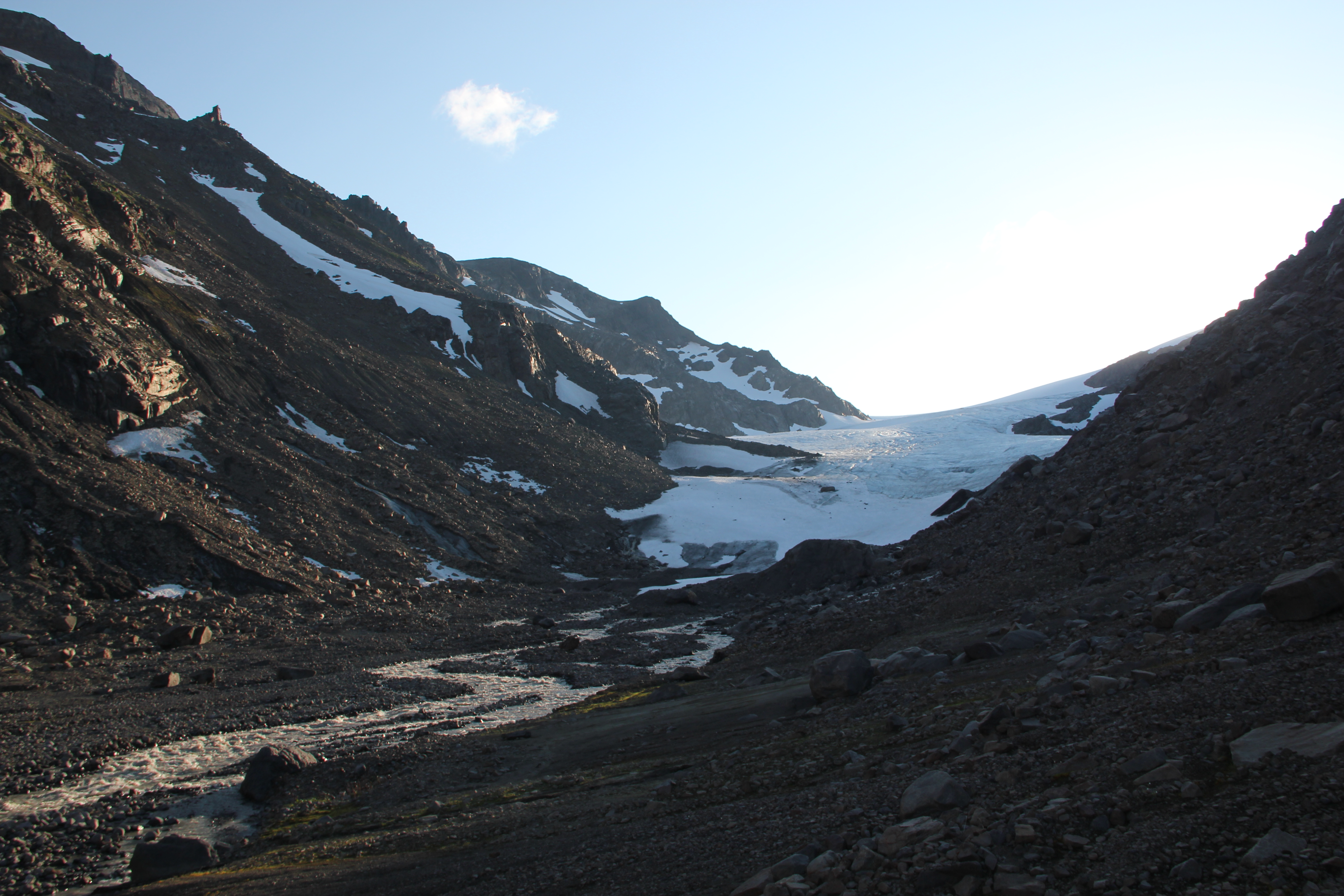
- Interactive map of: Langfjordjøkelen (Norwegian); Bártnatvuonjiehkki (Northern Sami)
- Location: Northern Norway
- Coordinates: 70.135931759°N 21.71739578°E
- Area: 8 km^{2} (3.1 sq mi)

Langfjordjøkelen (Norwegian) or Bártnatvuonjiehkki (Northern Sami) is a glacier that is located on the border of Finnmark and Troms counties in Norway, making it one of the northernmost glaciers on the mainland of Norway. The 8-square-kilometre (3.1 sq mi) glacier is located on the border of Loppa Municipality and Kvænangen Municipality. The highest point on the glacier reaches 1,050 metres (3,440 ft) above sea level.

Between publication of maps in 1976 and 2012, the snout of the Langfjordjokelen is shown to have retreated by approximately 1,400 metres (4,600 ft). The glacier is currently being studied by glaciologists as the snout is retreating faster than any other glacier in Europe.
