= Bergsfjord =

Village in Loppa, Norway

- Village
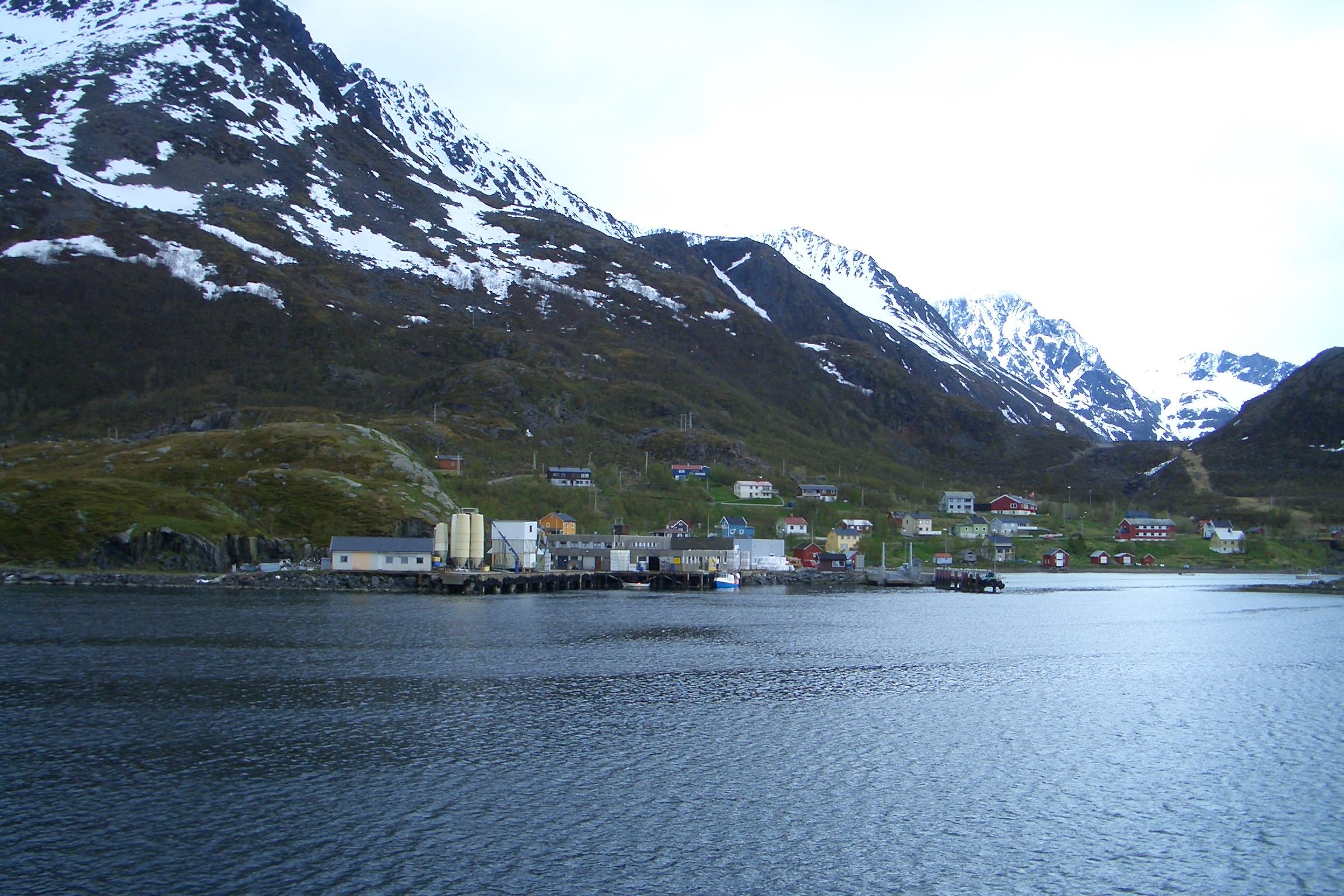
- View of the village
- Interactive map of Bergsfjord
- Location within Finnmark Location within Norway
- Coordinates: 70°14′57″N 21°47′31″E
- Country: Norway
- Region: Northern Norway
- County: Finnmark
- District: Vest-Finnmark
- Municipality: Loppa Municipality
- Elevation: 14 m (46 ft)
- Time zone: UTC+01:00 (CET)
  - Summer (DST): UTC+02:00 (CEST)
- Post Code: 9580 Bergsfjord

Bergsfjord is a village in Loppa Municipality in Finnmark county, Norway. The village is located on the mainland part of Loppa Municipality, along the Bergsfjorden, across from the island of Silda. The village of Sør-Tverrfjord lies about 5 kilometres (3.1 mi) to the southwest, across the fjord. The Svartfjellet mountain lies about 6 kilometres (3.7 mi) straight east of the village, alongside the Svartfjelljøkelen glacier.

Bergsfjord has no road connections to the rest of Norway. It is only accessible by ferry from the nearby villages of Sør-Tverrfjord and Øksfjord. Bergsfjord Church is located in this village.

In 2013, the fish processing factory in the village closed down.
