= Øksfjordjøkelen =

Glacier in Troms and Finnmark, Norway

Øksfjordjøkelen (Norwegian) Ákšovuonjiehkki (Northern Sami)
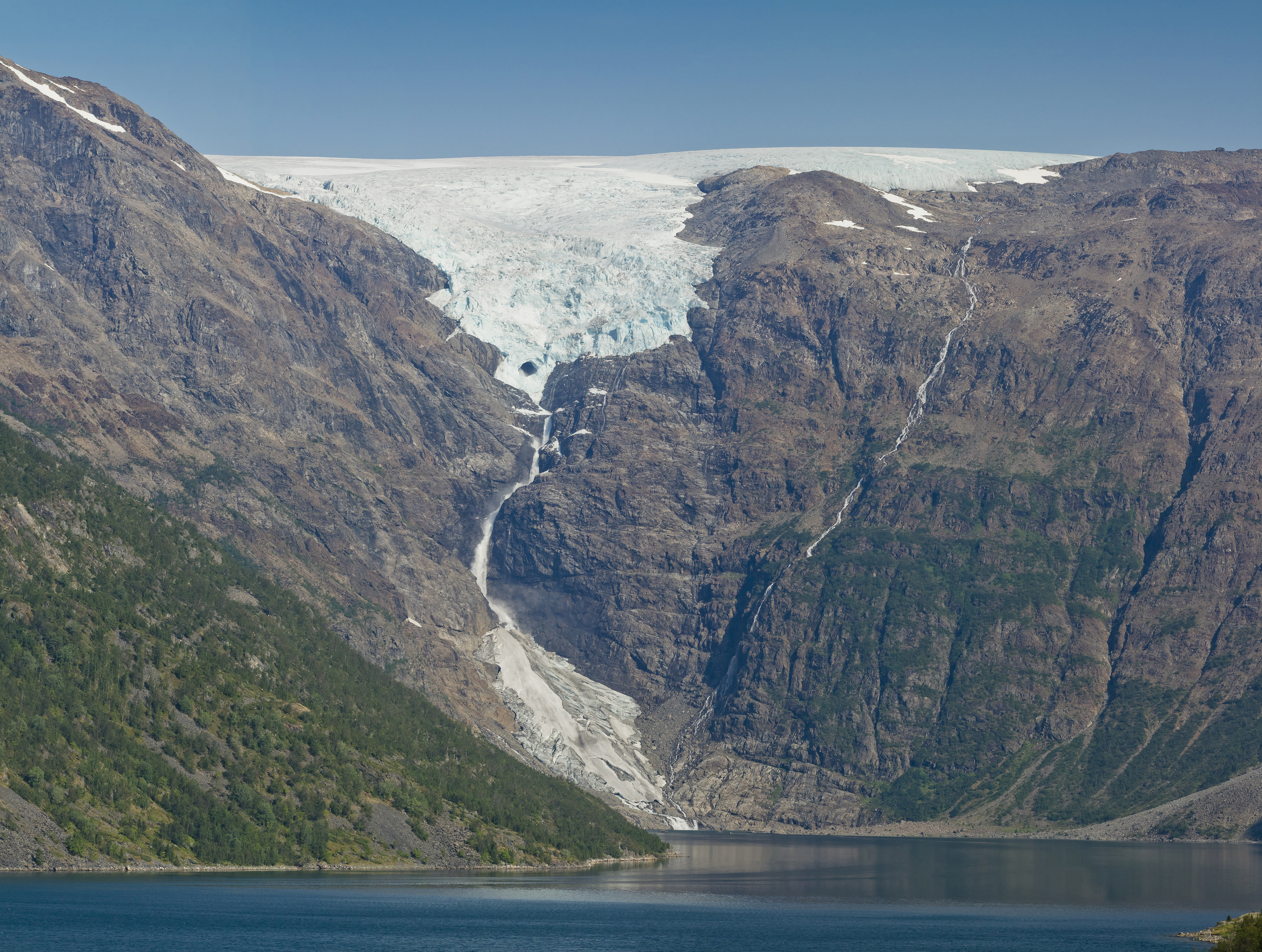
- View of the Øksfjordjøkelen glacier
- Interactive map of Øksfjordjøkelen (Norwegian); Ákšovuonjiehkki (Northern Sami)
- Type: Mountain Glacier
- Location: Finnmark and Troms, Norway
- Coordinates: 70°10′N 22°03′E
- Area: 42 km^{2} (16 sq mi)

Øksfjordjøkelen (Norwegian) or Ákšovuonjiehkki (Northern Sami) is the ninth largest glacier in mainland Norway. The glacier is located in Troms and Finnmark counties. The 42-square-kilometre (16 sq mi) glacier lies on the border of Loppa Municipality (in Finnmark) and Kvænangen Municipality (in Troms).

The highest point was earlier known to have an elevation of 1,204 metres (3,950 ft). It is now 1,191 metres (3,907 ft) due to glacier shrinkage. The mountain Svartfjellet lies just north of the glacier in Loppa Municipality. That is another of the highest points in Finnmark county. The lowest point on the glacier has an elevation of 330 metres (1,080 ft). The village of Alteidet in Kvænangen Municipality is located nearby, along the European route E6 highway.

== See also ==
- List of glaciers in Norway
- List of highest points of Norwegian counties
