= Øksfjord =

Village in Loppa, Norway

Øksfjord (Norwegian); Ákšovuotna (Northern Sami); Aksuvuono (Kven)
- Village
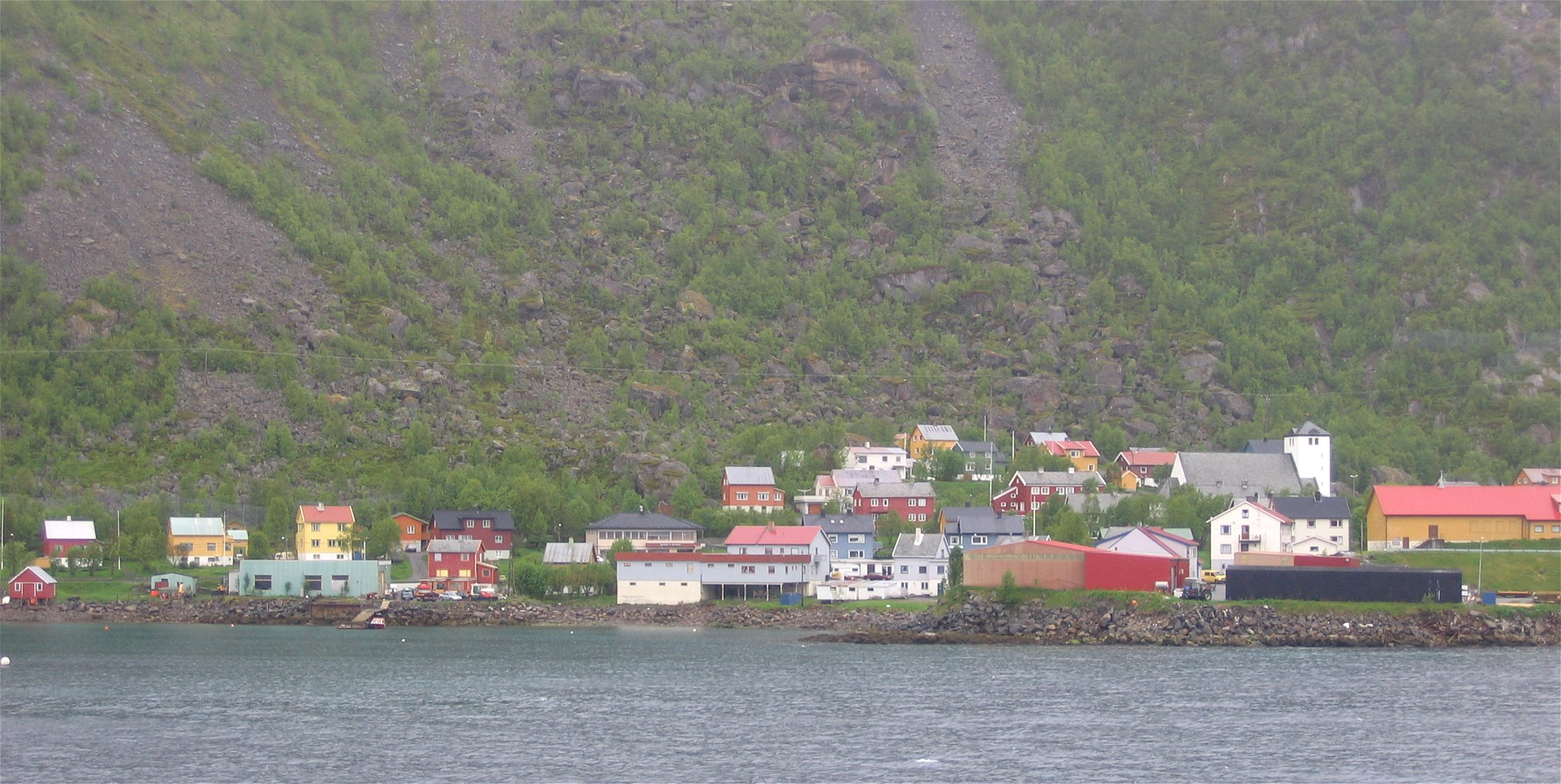
- View of the village
- Interactive map of: Øksfjord (Norwegian); Ákšovuotna (Northern Sami); Aksuvuono (Kven)
- Location within Finnmark Location within Norway
- Coordinates: 70.2394°N 22.3507°E
- Country: Norway
- Region: Northern Norway
- County: Finnmark
- District: Vest-Finnmark
- Municipality: Loppa Municipality

Area
  - Total: 0.33 km^{2} (0.13 sq mi)
- Elevation: 15 m (49 ft)

Population (2017)
  - Total: 504
  - Density: 1,527/km^{2} (3,950/sq mi)
- Time zone: UTC+01:00 (CET)
  - Summer (DST): UTC+02:00 (CEST)
- Post Code: 9550 Øksfjord

Øksfjord (Norwegian), Ákšovuotna (Northern Sami), or Aksuvuono (Kven) is the administrative centre of Loppa Municipality in Finnmark county, Norway. The village is located on the east side of the Øksfjorden, just south of the mouth of the fjord. Øksfjord Church is located in the village. The village has one café and one pub, as of 2015. The village of Øksfjordbotn lies about 20 kilometres (12 mi) to the southeast, near the border with Alta Municipality.

The 0.33-square-kilometre (82-acre) village has a population (2023) of 504 and a population density of 1,527 inhabitants per square kilometre (3,950/sq mi).

== Transportation ==
Øksfjord is visited by the Hurtigruten coastal service boat daily, stopping here between stops at Skjervøy and Hammerfest. Since most of Loppa Municipality is inaccessible by car, Øksfjord is a major transportation hub with regular car ferry connections to the Nuvsvåg, Bergsfjord, and Sør-Tverrfjord areas. There is also a regular ferry connection from Øksfjord to the village of Hasvik on the neighboring island of Sørøya in Hasvik Municipality.

== History ==
On 12 April 1941, the Royal Norwegian Navy (which was exiled to the United Kingdom at that time) moored the destroyer Mansfield at the pier at one o'clock in the night, with two objectives: To show the people of occupied Norway that the Navy was operating on the coast of Norway; and to blow up a fish oil factory. The warship departed after two hours, while inhabitants stood on the pier singing the national anthem.

== Media gallery ==
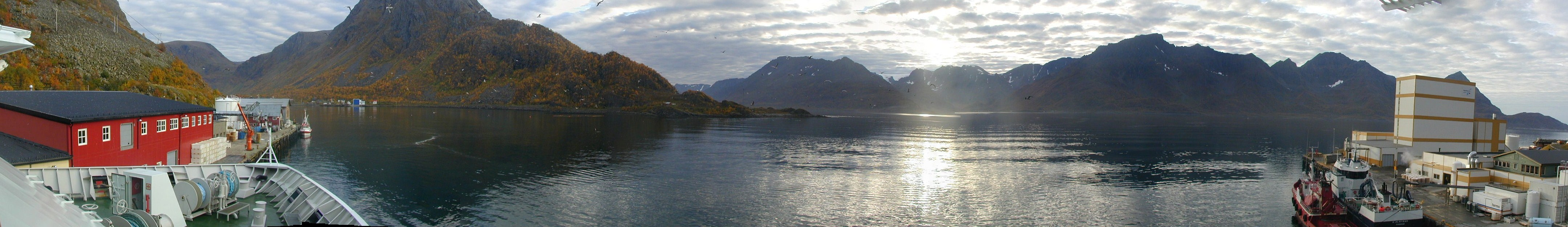
View of the stunning surrounding area looking to the southwest from Øksfjord
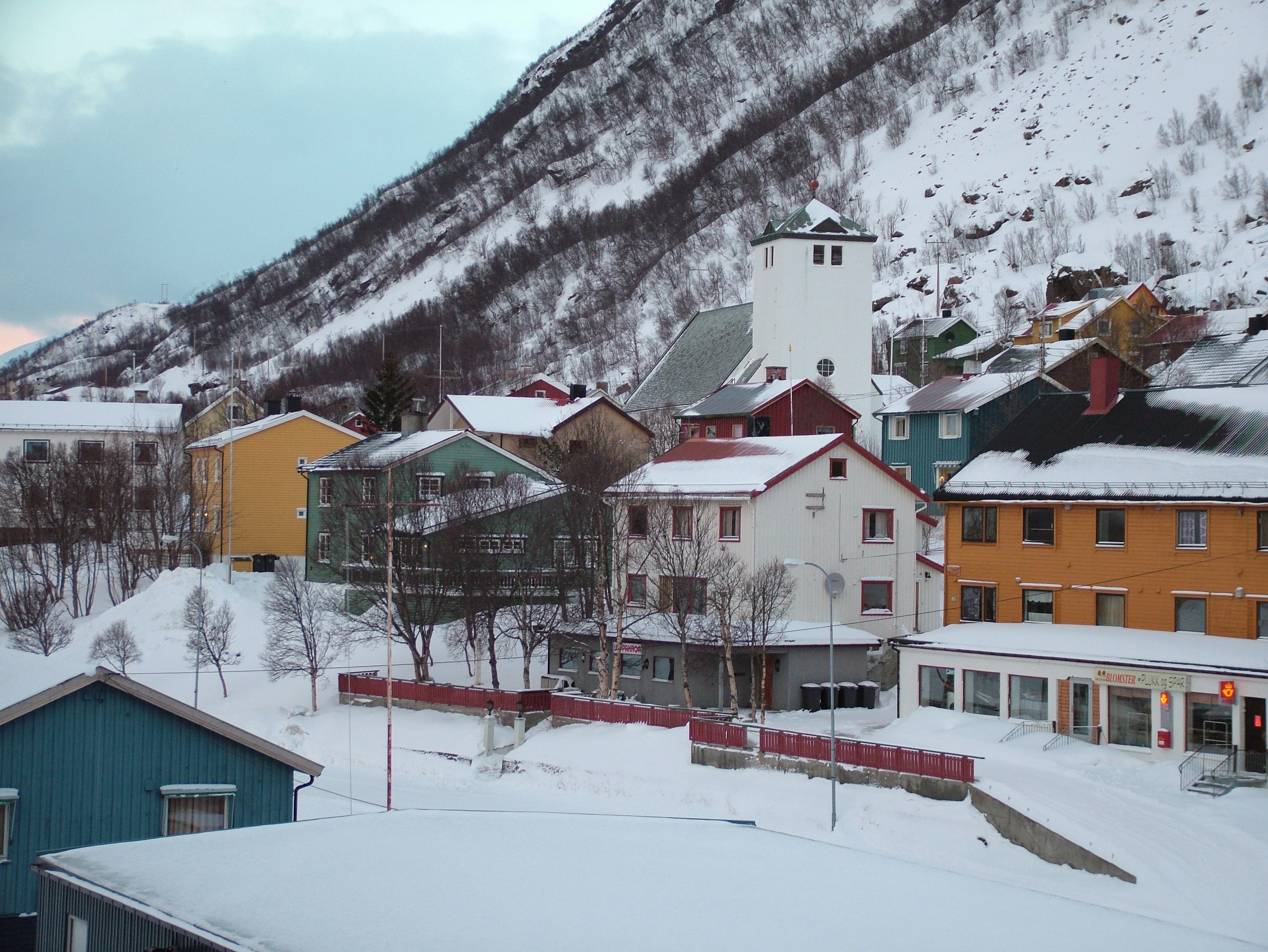
View of the village

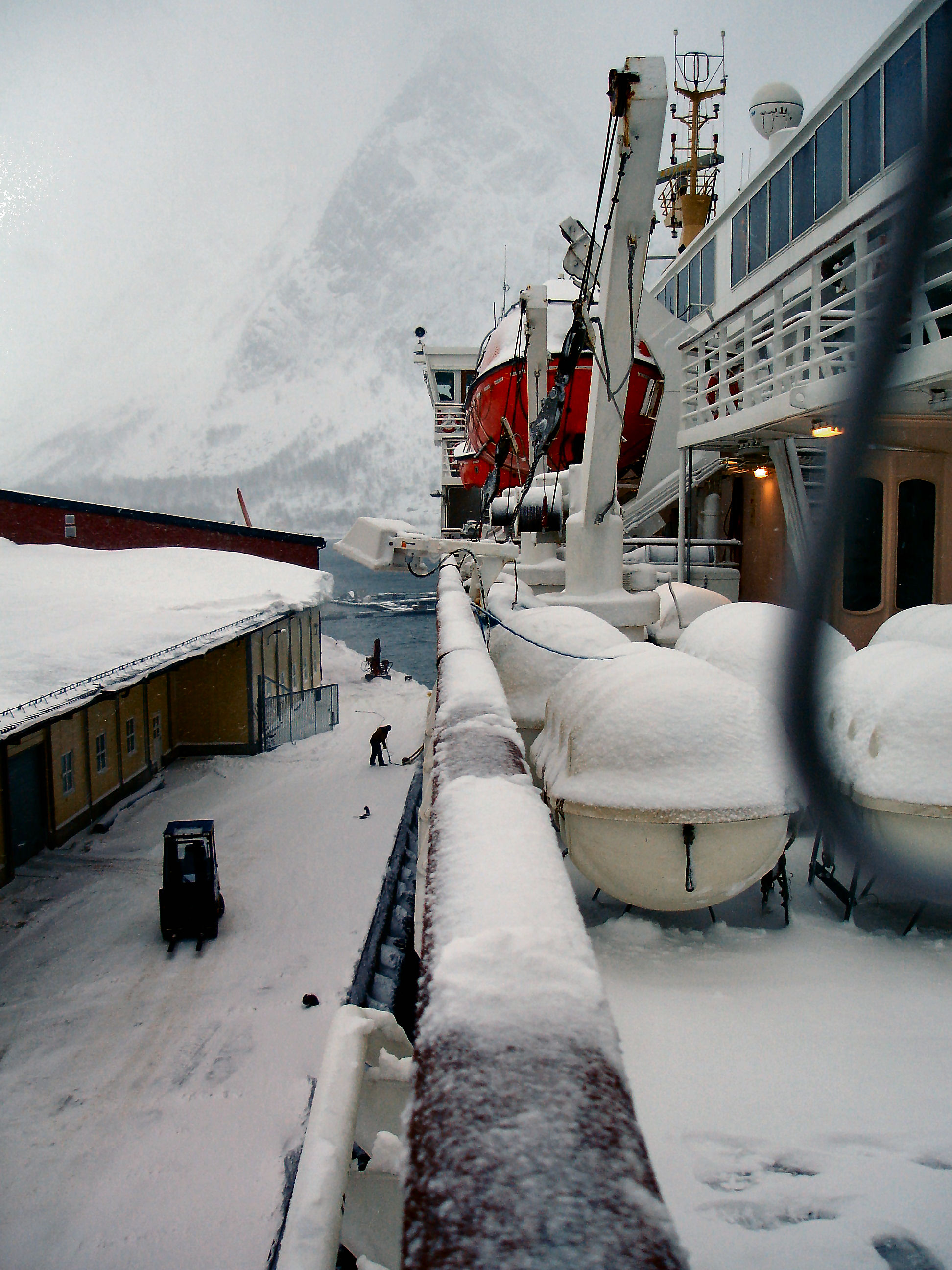
The Hurtigruten ship MS Narvik docked in Øksfjord

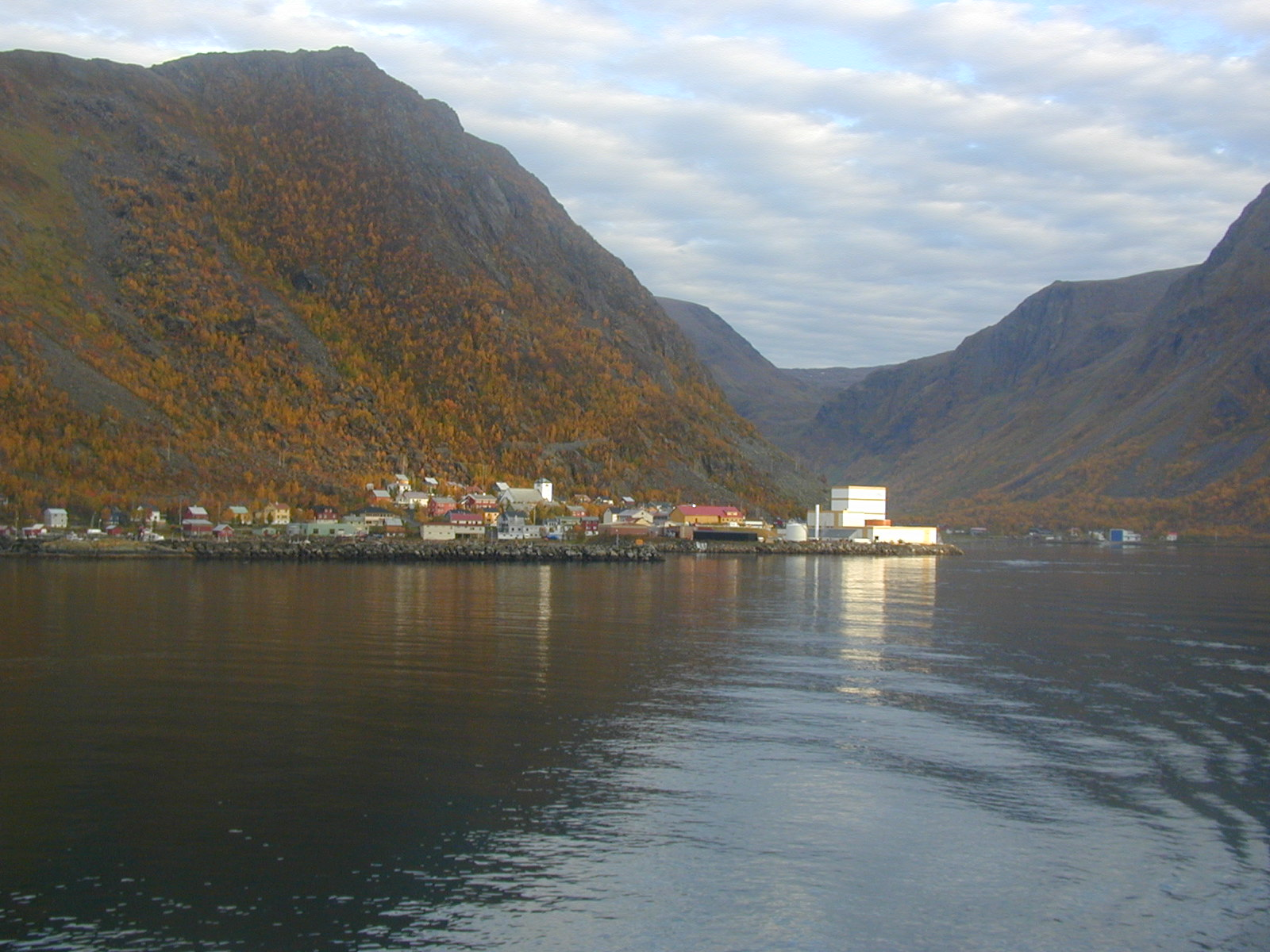
View of the village from a distance

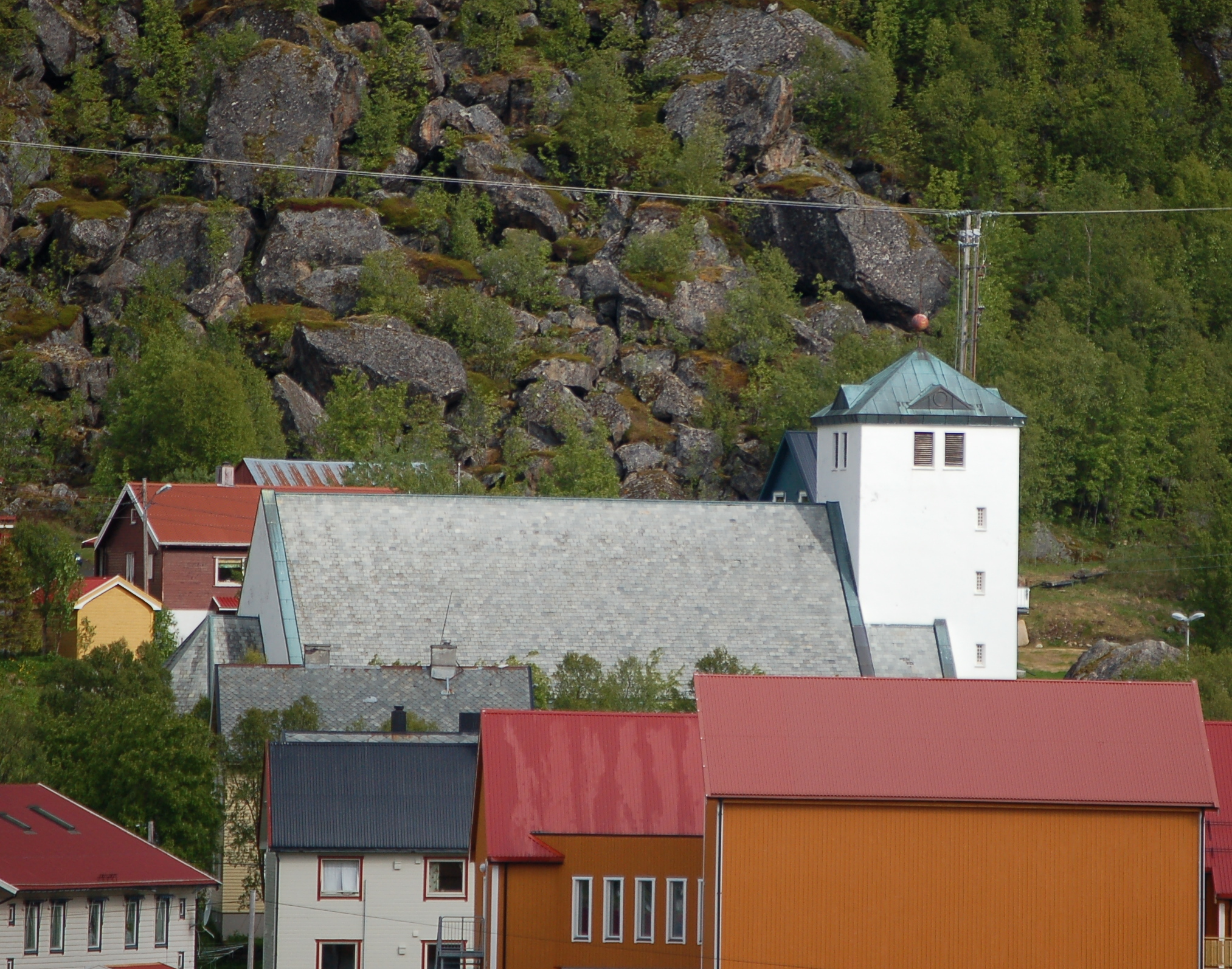
View of Øksfjord Church

== Climate ==
Øksfjord's climate type is dominated by the winter season, a long, bitterly cold period with short, clear days, relatively little precipitation mostly in the form of snow, and low humidity. The Köppen Climate Classification subtype for this climate is "Dfc". (Continental Subarctic Climate).

Climate data for Øksfjord
Month	Jan	Feb	Mar	Apr	May	Jun	Jul	Aug	Sep	Oct	Nov	Dec	Year
Mean daily maximum °C (°F)	−2 (28)	−2 (29)	0 (32)	3 (37)	8 (46)	13 (55)	16 (60)	14 (58)	10 (50)	5 (41)	1 (34)	−1 (31)	5 (41)
Mean daily minimum °C (°F)	−8 (18)	−7 (19)	−5 (23)	−2 (28)	2 (36)	6 (43)	9 (49)	8 (47)	5 (41)	1 (33)	−3 (26)	−6 (21)	0 (32)
Average precipitation mm (inches)	74 (2.9)	66 (2.6)	56 (2.2)	51 (2)	46 (1.8)	51 (2)	58 (2.3)	71 (2.8)	79 (3.1)	100 (4.1)	81 (3.2)	86 (3.4)	830 (32.7)
Mean daily daylight hours	0	8.5	12.8	20	24	24	24	21	14.4	9.9	3.4	0	13.5
Source: Weatherbase

== Popular culture ==
- Øksfjord is the setting of the 2009 film Dead Snow

== Notable people ==
- Hans E. Kinck (1865–1926), a novelist, dramatist, and essayist who was born and raised in Øksfjord
- Hallgeir Pedersen, a jazz guitarist who lives in Øksfjord
