= Lopphavet =

- Loppahavet
- Interactive map of the sea
- Location: Northern Norway
- Coordinates: 70.4418°N 21.1333°E
- Type: Sea
- Basin countries: Norway
- Max. width: 70 kilometres (43 mi)

Lopphavet is a stretch of open sea along the border of Troms and Finnmark counties in Norway. It has a width of about 70 kilometres (43 mi), and it stretches between the large island of Sørøya in Finnmark and the islands of Arnøya and Nord-Fugløya in Troms. The Sørøysundet strait and the Altafjorden connect to the Lopphavet on the east side of the sea. The Kvænangen fjord connects to the south. The Fugløysundet strait connects to it in the west.
