= Rolvsøya =

Island in Norway

Rolvsøya (Norwegian); Gádde-Iččát (Northern Sami)
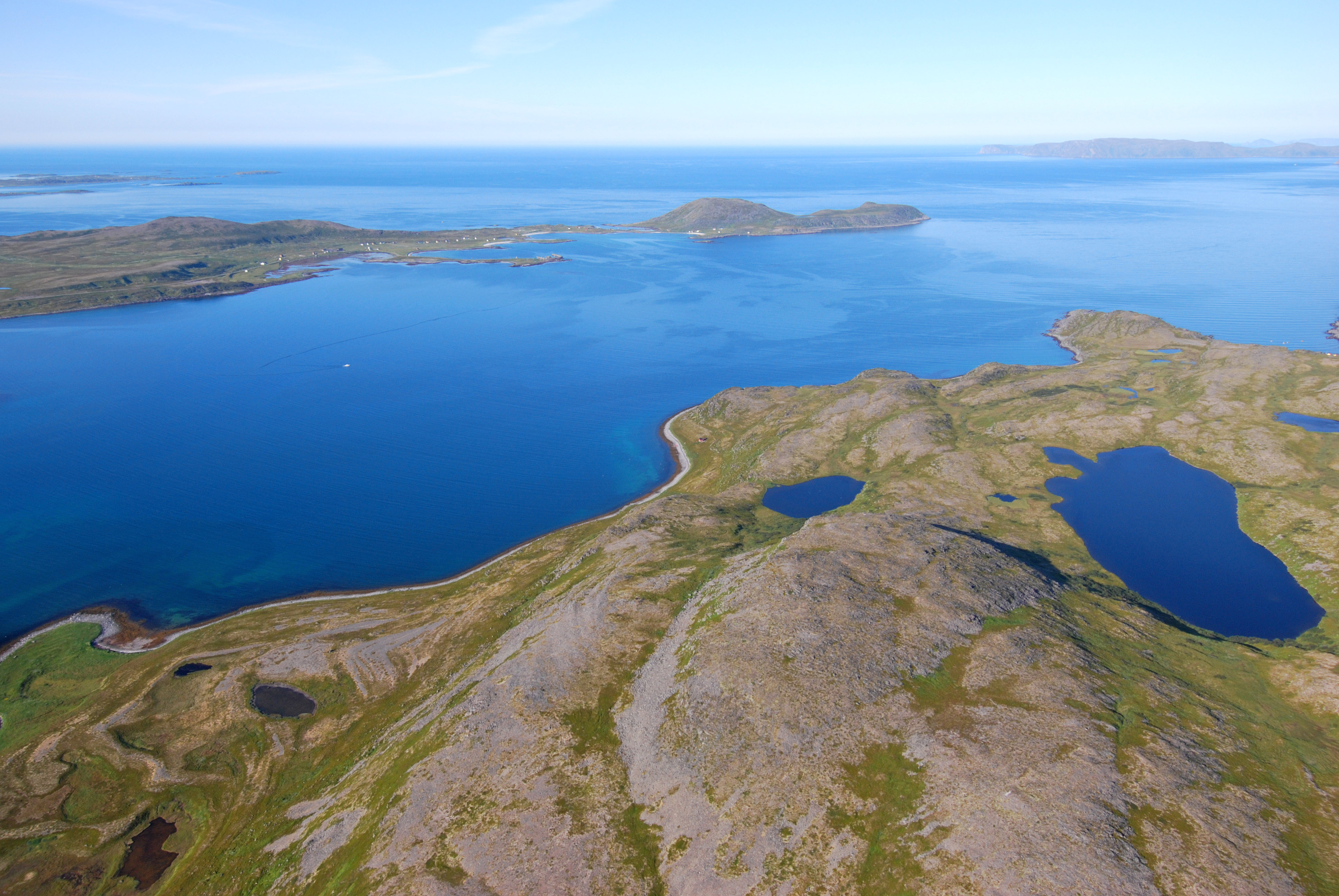
- Interactive map of: Rolvsøya (Norwegian); Gádde-Iččát (Northern Sami)

Geography
- Location: Finnmark, Norway
- Coordinates: 70.98°N 24.03°E
- Area: 89 km^{2} (34 sq mi)
- Length: 14 km (8.7 mi)
- Width: 13.5 km (8.39 mi)
- Highest elevation: 363 m (1191 ft)
- Highest point: Valfjordnæringen

Administration
- Norway
- County: Finnmark
- Municipality: Måsøy Municipality

Demographics
- Population: 72 (2001)
- Pop. density: 0.8/km^{2} (2.1/sq mi)

Rolvsøya (Norwegian) or Gádde-Iččát (Northern Sami) is an island in Måsøy Municipality in Finnmark county, Norway. The 89-square-kilometre (34 sq mi) island has a population (2001) of 72. The island is located south of the island of Ingøya and north and west of the mainland, separated by the Rolvsøysundet.

The island is mountainous and is almost bisected by the Valfjorden from the west and the Langfjorden from the east with an 800-metre (2,600 ft) wide swampy isthmus in between. Almost all settlements are on the island's northern part. On the west side lies the fishing village of Tufjord and on the eastern side is the seaside village of Gunnarnes where there is a ferry connection to the villages of Havøysund and Ingøy. Gunnarnes Chapel is located on the east side of the island.

The population is 70 (according to NRK in 2023).

== See also ==
- List of islands of Norway
