= Ingøya =

Island in Norway

Ingøya (Norwegian); Fávle-Iččát (Northern Sami)
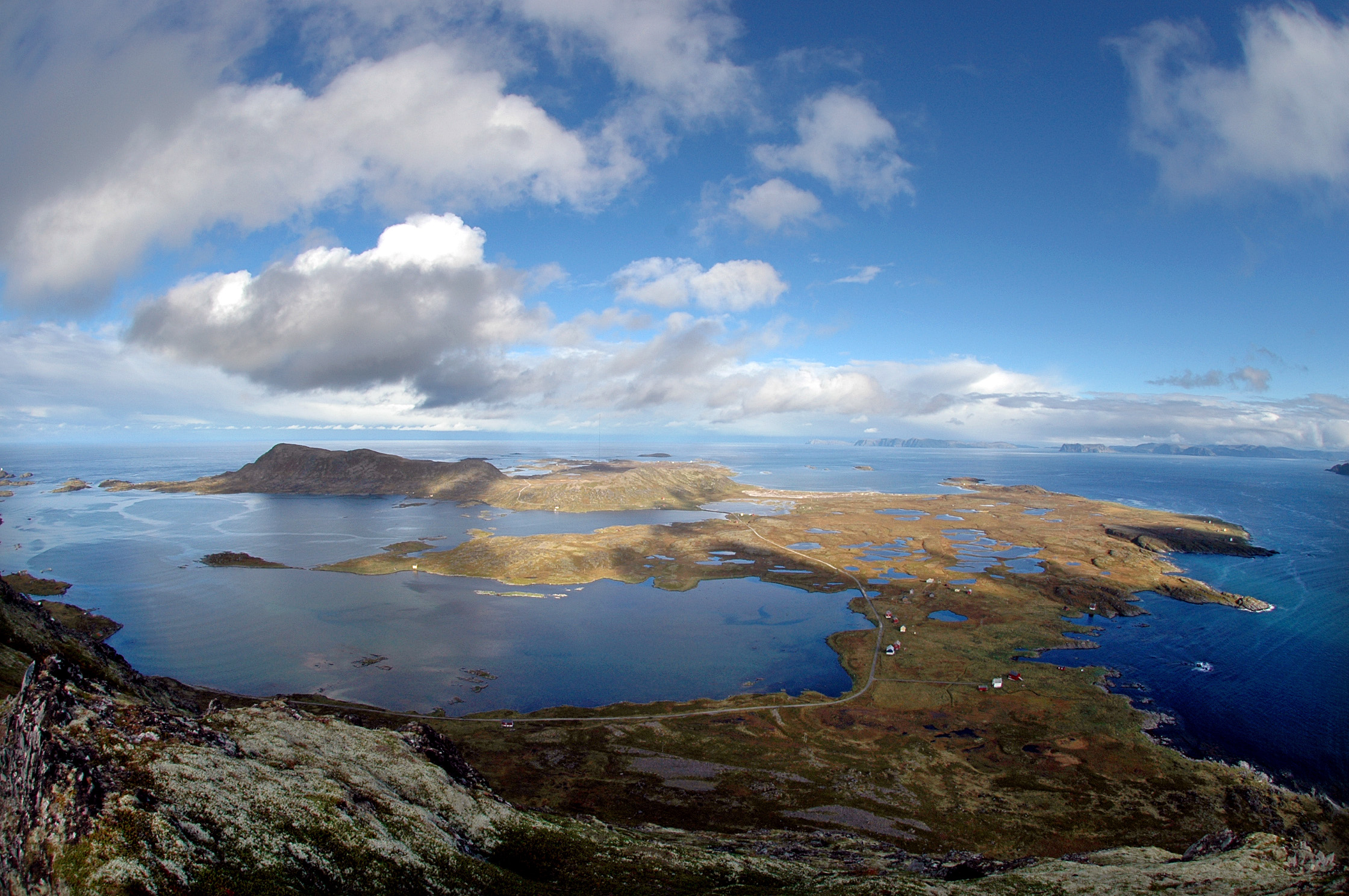
- Interactive map of: Ingøya (Norwegian); Fávle-Iččát (Northern Sami)

Geography
- Location: Finnmark, Norway
- Coordinates: 71.0595°N 23.9676°E
- Area: 18 km^{2} (6.9 sq mi)
- Length: 7.8 km (4.85 mi)
- Width: 5 km (3.1 mi)
- Highest elevation: 332 m (1089 ft)
- Highest point: Mafjordfjellet

Administration
- Norway
- County: Finnmark
- Municipality: Måsøy Municipality

Demographics
- Population: 29 (2026)
- Pop. density: https://www.ssb.no/en/statbank/table/04317

Ingøya (Norwegian) or Fávle-Iččát (Northern Sami) is an island on the edge of the Arctic Ocean in Måsøy Municipality in Finnmark county, Norway. The 18-square-kilometre (6.9 sq mi) island lies just north of the island of Rolvsøya and west of the island of Hjelmsøya. The sparsely populated island is only accessible by boat.

There are regular ferry connections at the port in the village of Ingøy on the north side of the island. The ferry connects to Gunnarnes on Rolvsøya and Havøysund on the island of Havøya. The island has about 13 inhabitants (2022). The Ingøy radio transmitter is located about 2 kilometres (1.2 mi) south of the village of Ingøy. The signals from the transmitter was shut down in 2019. Fruholmen Lighthouse lies just off the northern coast of the island.

From the northwest, the broad Mafjorden cuts into the island of Ingøya and on the east side there is an open bay called Sanden.

The southwestern part of the island is quite mountainous with the highest peak being the 332-metre (1,089 ft) tall Mafjordfjellet. The southern and eastern parts of the island are flat and partially swampy. The northern part is a more mountainous part where the fishing village of Ingøy is located. Ingøy Church is located in Ingøy village. Historically, Mafjorden, Gåsnes, and Ingøy were all large fishing villages. There were two whaling stations located in Mafjorden that operated until the early 20th century.

== See also ==
- List of islands of Norway
