= Måsøy Municipality =

Municipality in Finnmark, Norway

Måsøy Municipality Måsøy kommune Muosátsullo gielda (Northern Sami) Moseijan komuuni (Kven)
- Municipality
- Maasø herred (historic name)
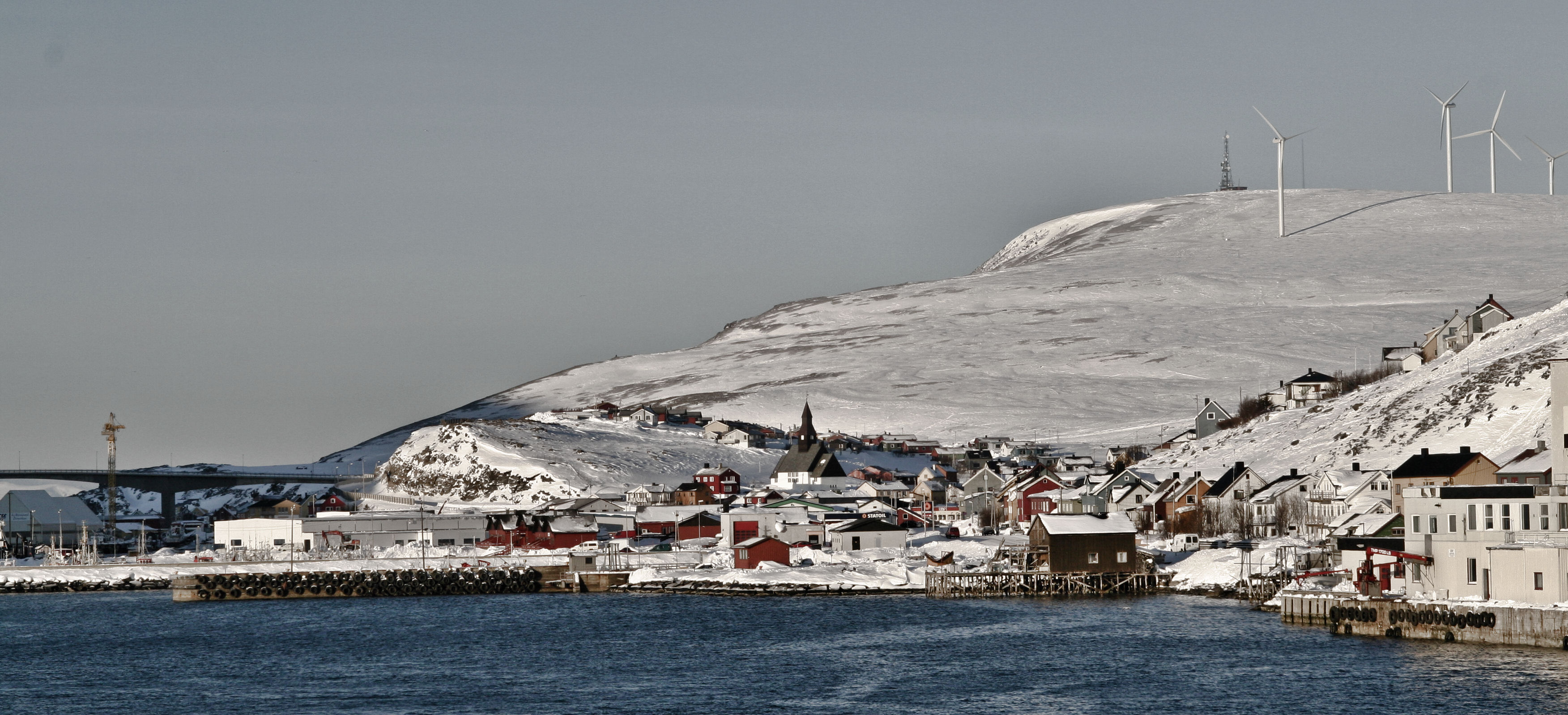
- View of Havøysund in the winter

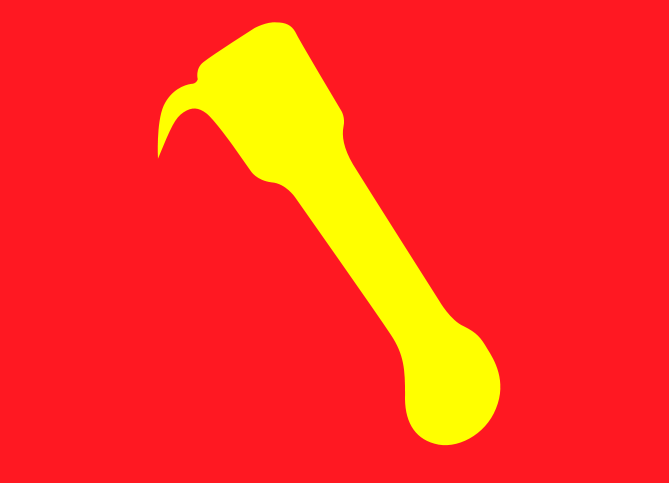
- Flag Coat of arms

- Finnmark within Norway

- Måsøy within Finnmark
- Coordinates: 70°59′48″N 24°39′41″E
- Country: Norway
- County: Finnmark
- District: Vest-Finnmark
- Established: 1 January 1838
  - Created as: Formannskapsdistrikt
- Administrative centre: Havøysund

Government
  - Mayor (2023): Ingrid Majala (LL)

Area
  - Total: 1,137.19 km^{2} (439.07 sq mi)
  - Land: 1,068.39 km^{2} (412.51 sq mi)
  - Water: 68.80 km^{2} (26.56 sq mi) 6.1%
  - Rank: #96 in Norway
- Highest elevation: 633.7 m (2,079 ft)

Population (2024)
  - Total: 1,113
  - Rank: #328 in Norway
  - Density: 1/km^{2} (2.6/sq mi)
  - Change (10 years): ▼ −10.3%
- Demonym: Måsøying

Official language
  - Norwegian form: Bokmål
- Time zone: UTC+01:00 (CET)
  - Summer (DST): UTC+02:00 (CEST)
- ISO 3166 code: NO-5618
- Website: Official website

Måsøy (Northern Sami: Muosát; Kven: Moseija) is a municipality in Finnmark county, Norway. The administrative centre of the municipality is the village of Havøysund. Other villages include Bakfjord, Gunnarnes, Ingøy, Måsøy, Slåtten, and Snefjord. The municipality is located on the mainland as well as several islands.

The 1,137-square-kilometre (439 sq mi) municipality is the 96th largest by area out of the 357 municipalities in Norway. Måsøy is the 328th most populous municipality in Norway with a population of 1,113. The municipality's population density is 1 inhabitant per square kilometre (2.6/sq mi) and its population has decreased by 10.3% over the previous 10-year period.

The municipality includes the Fruholmen Lighthouse, the northernmost lighthouse in Norway as well as the Havøysund Bridge, the northernmost bridge in the world. The tallest tower in Scandinavia, the 362-meter (1,188 ft) tall Ingøy radio transmitter is located on Ingøya island.

The Hurtigruten coastal express boat stops at the village of Havøysund daily. There is also a road connection to Havøysund, albeit often blocked by snow in the winter at the pass between Snefjord and Bakfjord. Norwegian County Road 889 connects the mainland to Havøysund. Bus services between Havøysund and Olderfjord (bus hub), operates twice a day. The nearest airport is Lakselv Banak Airport.

== General information ==
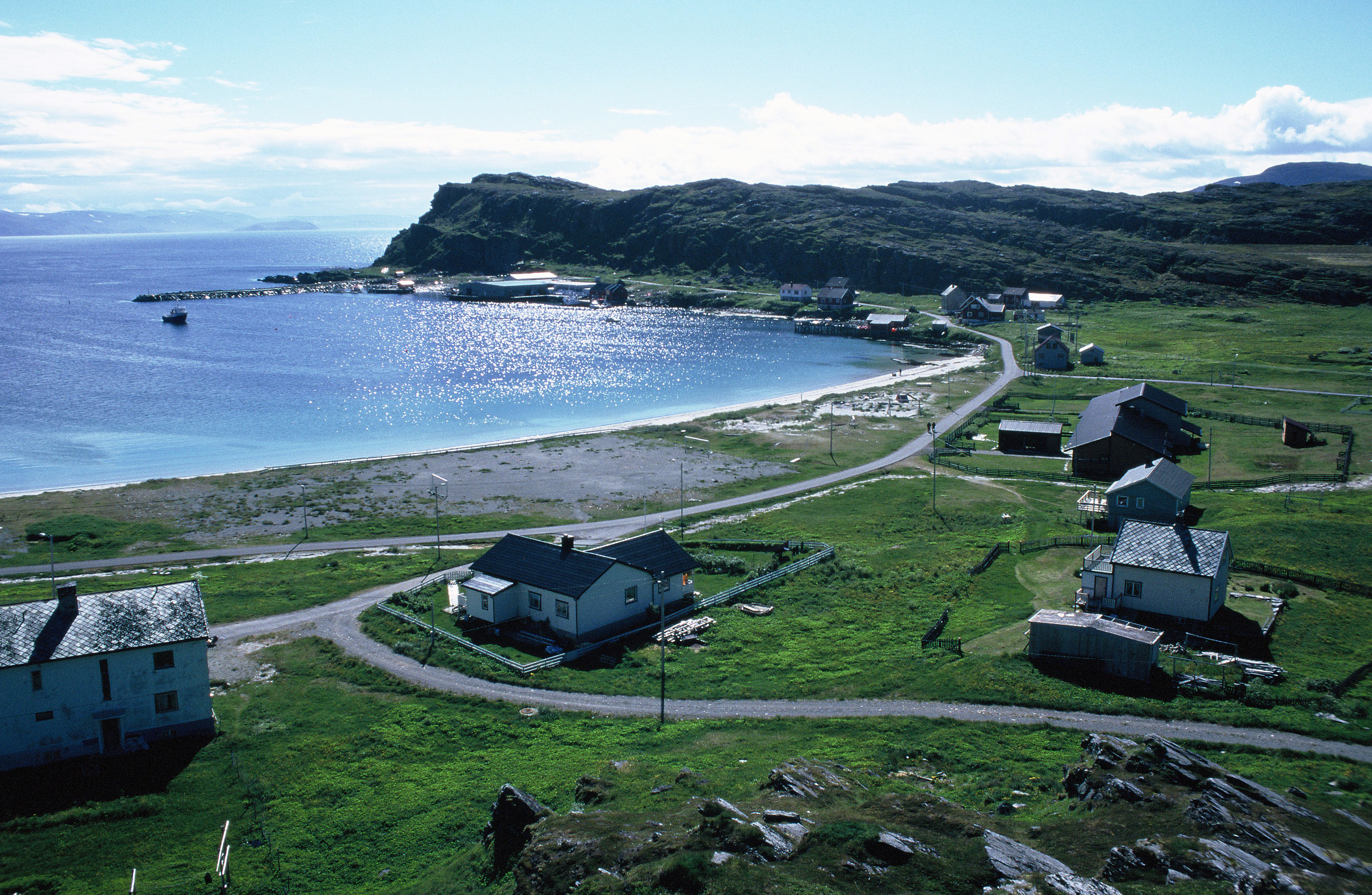
View of the village of Måsøy

The town of Hammerfest and the vast surrounding "rural district of Hammerfest" was established as the municipality of Hammerfest by og landdistrikt on 1 January 1838 (see formannskapsdistrikt law). Soon after (the same year), the northern district (population: 498) was separated to become the new Maasøe Municipality, named after the village on the island of Måsøya where the local Måsøy Church is located. The spelling was later changed to Måsøy.

On 1 January 1963, a small area of southern Måsøy, north of Kokelv, (population: 34) was transferred to the neighboring Kvalsund Municipality. On 1 January 1984, the western part of the island of Magerøya (population: 240) was transferred from Måsøy to the neighboring Nordkapp Municipality.

On 1 January 2020, the municipality became part of the newly formed Troms og Finnmark county. Previously, it had been part of the old Finnmark county. On 1 January 2024, the Troms og Finnmark county was divided and the municipality once again became part of Finnmark county.

=== Name ===
The municipality (originally the parish) is named after the island of Måsøya (Old Norse: Másøy) since the first Måsøy Church was built there. The first element is mási, the diminutive form of the genitive case of the word már which means "little seagull". The last element is øy which means "island". Historically, the name of the municipality was spelled Maasø or Maasøe. On 3 November 1917, a royal resolution changed the spelling of the name of the municipality to Maasøy. On 21 December 1917, a royal resolution enacted the 1917 Norwegian language reforms. Prior to this change, the name was spelled Maasøy with the digraph "aa", and after this reform, the name was spelled Måsøy, using the letter å instead.

=== Coat of arms ===
The coat of arms was granted on 7 September 1984. The official blazon is "Gules, a gaff bendwise Or" (Norwegian: I rødt en gull klepp skrått oppad). This means the arms have a red field (background) and the charge is a fishing gaff. The gaff has a tincture of Or which means it is commonly colored yellow, but if it is made out of metal, then gold is used. A gaff is a stick with a metal hook or a barbed spear (historically it was made of bone). It is used for pulling large fish onto a boat. These fishing gaffs have been used for many centuries in the municipality. The tool was chosen as a symbol for the importance of fishing to the municipality. The arms were designed by Arvid Sveen.

=== Churches ===
The Church of Norway has one parish (sokn) within Måsøy Municipality. It is part of the Hammerfest prosti (deanery) in the Diocese of Nord-Hålogaland.

Churches in Måsøy Municipality
Parish (sokn)	Church name	Location	Year built
Måsøy	Gunnarnes Chapel	Rolvsøya	1986
Måsøy	Havøysund Church	Havøysund	1961
Måsøy	Ingøy Church	Ingøy	1957
Måsøy	Måsøy Church	Måsøya	1953
Måsøy	Slotten Chapel	Slåtten	1963

== Government ==
Måsøy Municipality is responsible for primary education (through 10th grade), outpatient health services, senior citizen services, welfare and other social services, zoning, economic development, and municipal roads and utilities. The municipality is governed by a municipal council of directly elected representatives. The mayor is indirectly elected by a vote of the municipal council. The municipality is under the jurisdiction of the Vestre Finnmark District Court and the Hålogaland Court of Appeal.

=== Municipal council ===
The municipal council (Kommunestyre) of Måsøy Municipality is made up of 15 representatives that are elected to four year terms. The tables below show the current and historical composition of the council by political party.

Måsøy kommunestyre 2023–2027
Party name (in Norwegian)	Number of representatives
Labour Party (Arbeiderpartiet)	5
Conservative Party (Høyre)	2
Centre Party (Senterpartiet)	3
Local List for Måsøy (Bygdelista i Måsøy)	5
Total number of members:	15

Måsøy kommunestyre 2019–2023
Party name (in Norwegian)	Number of representatives
Labour Party (Arbeiderpartiet)	6
Conservative Party (Høyre)	3
Red Party (Rødt)	1
Centre Party (Senterpartiet)	5
Total number of members:	15

Måsøy kommunestyre 2015–2019
Party name (in Norwegian)	Number of representatives
Labour Party (Arbeiderpartiet)	6
Conservative Party (Høyre)	2
Centre Party (Senterpartiet)	7
Total number of members:	15

Måsøy kommunestyre 2011–2015
Party name (in Norwegian)	Number of representatives
Labour Party (Arbeiderpartiet)	7
Conservative Party (Høyre)	6
Centre Party (Senterpartiet)	4
Total number of members:	15

Måsøy kommunestyre 2007–2011
Party name (in Norwegian)	Number of representatives
Labour Party (Arbeiderpartiet)	9
Progress Party (Fremskrittspartiet)	1
Conservative Party (Høyre)	3
Centre Party (Senterpartiet)	3
Socialist Left Party (Sosialistisk Venstreparti)	1
Total number of members:	17

Måsøy kommunestyre 2003–2007
Party name (in Norwegian)	Number of representatives
Labour Party (Arbeiderpartiet)	8
Conservative Party (Høyre)	2
Centre Party (Senterpartiet)	4
Socialist Left Party (Sosialistisk Venstreparti)	3
Total number of members:	17

Måsøy kommunestyre 1999–2003
Party name (in Norwegian)	Number of representatives
Labour Party (Arbeiderpartiet)	13
Conservative Party (Høyre)	2
Centre Party (Senterpartiet)	5
Socialist Left Party (Sosialistisk Venstreparti)	1
Total number of members:	21

Måsøy kommunestyre 1995–1999
Party name (in Norwegian)	Number of representatives
Labour Party (Arbeiderpartiet)	10
Conservative Party (Høyre)	1
Centre Party (Senterpartiet)	8
Socialist Left Party (Sosialistisk Venstreparti)	2
Total number of members:	21

Måsøy kommunestyre 1991–1995
Party name (in Norwegian)	Number of representatives
Labour Party (Arbeiderpartiet)	9
Conservative Party (Høyre)	1
Centre Party (Senterpartiet)	8
Socialist Left Party (Sosialistisk Venstreparti)	3
Total number of members:	21

Måsøy kommunestyre 1987–1991
Party name (in Norwegian)	Number of representatives
Labour Party (Arbeiderpartiet)	12
Conservative Party (Høyre)	1
Centre Party (Senterpartiet)	5
Socialist Left Party (Sosialistisk Venstreparti)	1
Local list for Måsøy (Bygdelista i Måsøy)	2
Total number of members:	21

Måsøy kommunestyre 1983–1987
Party name (in Norwegian)	Number of representatives
Labour Party (Arbeiderpartiet)	11
Conservative Party (Høyre)	1
Centre Party (Senterpartiet)	5
Socialist Left Party (Sosialistisk Venstreparti)	1
Local list for Måsøy municipality (Bygdelista i Måsøy kommune)	3
Total number of members:	21

Måsøy kommunestyre 1979–1983
Party name (in Norwegian)	Number of representatives
Labour Party (Arbeiderpartiet)	11
Conservative Party (Høyre)	3
Christian Democratic Party (Kristelig Folkeparti)	1
Centre Party (Senterpartiet)	4
Socialist Left Party (Sosialistisk Venstreparti)	2
Total number of members:	21

Måsøy kommunestyre 1975–1979
Party name (in Norwegian)	Number of representatives
Labour Party (Arbeiderpartiet)	12
Conservative Party (Høyre)	1
Christian Democratic Party (Kristelig Folkeparti)	1
Centre Party (Senterpartiet)	4
Socialist Left Party (Sosialistisk Venstreparti)	3
Total number of members:	21

Måsøy kommunestyre 1971–1975
Party name (in Norwegian)	Number of representatives
Labour Party (Arbeiderpartiet)	14
Conservative Party (Høyre)	1
Christian Democratic Party (Kristelig Folkeparti)	1
Centre Party (Senterpartiet)	3
Socialist common list (Venstresosialistiske felleslister)	2
Total number of members:	21

Måsøy kommunestyre 1967–1971
Party name (in Norwegian)	Number of representatives
Labour Party (Arbeiderpartiet)	18
Conservative Party (Høyre)	3
Total number of members:	21

Måsøy kommunestyre 1963–1967
Party name (in Norwegian)	Number of representatives
Labour Party (Arbeiderpartiet)	19
Conservative Party (Høyre)	2
Total number of members:	21

Måsøy herredsstyre 1959–1963
Party name (in Norwegian)	Number of representatives
Labour Party (Arbeiderpartiet)	14
Conservative Party (Høyre)	4
Communist Party (Kommunistiske Parti)	3
Total number of members:	21

Måsøy herredsstyre 1955–1959
Party name (in Norwegian)	Number of representatives
Labour Party (Arbeiderpartiet)	11
Conservative Party (Høyre)	4
Communist Party (Kommunistiske Parti)	5
List of workers, fishermen, and small farmholders (Arbeidere, fiskere, småbrukere liste)	1
Total number of members:	21

Måsøy herredsstyre 1951–1955
Party name (in Norwegian)	Number of representatives
Labour Party (Arbeiderpartiet)	10
Communist Party (Kommunistiske Parti)	4
Local List(s) (Lokale lister)	2
Total number of members:	16

Måsøy herredsstyre 1947–1951
Party name (in Norwegian)	Number of representatives
Labour Party (Arbeiderpartiet)	9
Communist Party (Kommunistiske Parti)	5
List of workers, fishermen, and small farmholders (Arbeidere, fiskere, småbrukere liste)	2
Total number of members:	16

Måsøy herredsstyre 1945–1947
Party name (in Norwegian)	Number of representatives
Labour Party (Arbeiderpartiet)	10
List of workers, fishermen, and small farmholders (Arbeidere, fiskere, småbrukere liste)	6
Total number of members:	16

Måsøy herredsstyre 1937–1941*
Party name (in Norwegian)	Number of representatives
Labour Party (Arbeiderpartiet)	13
List of workers, fishermen, and small farmholders (Arbeidere, fiskere, småbrukere liste)	1
Joint List(s) of Non-Socialist Parties (Borgerlige Felleslister)	2
Total number of members:	16
Note: Due to the German occupation of Norway during World War II, no elections were held for new municipal councils until after the war ended in 1945.

=== Mayors ===
The mayor (Norwegian: ordfører) of Måsøy Municipality is the political leader of the municipality and the chairperson of the municipal council. Here is a list of people who have held this position:

- 1838–1851: Hans Sommer Ulich
- 1852–1854: Ole Simonsen
- 1855–1863: Paul Fredriksen
- 1864–1870: Peder Mortensen
- 1871–1871: Anton Christopher Hagerup
- 1872–1876: Reinholdt Fredrik Tønder Larsen
- 1877–1882: Carl Cornelius Marthin Dons
- 1883–1884: Christoffer Alfred Louis Reinch Habel (H)
- 1885–1887: Martin Fredrik Nibe
- 1888–1895: Enok Johnsen
- 1895–1901: Sivert Lauritz Aasen (H)
- 1902–1904: William Dahl Ulich (H)
- 1905–1907: Simon Edvard Sørensen
- 1908–1913: Sivert Sveen (V)
- 1914–1920: William Dahl Ulich (H)
- 1921–1922: Kornelius Jakobsen (V)
- 1923–1929: Carl Rebek Olsen (H)
- 1928–1941: Johannes Olai Olsen (Ap)
- 1941–1945: Sigurd Anstensen (NS)
- 1945–1946: Johannes Olai Olsen (Ap)
- 1946–1956: Karl Sigfred Gregersen
- 1957–1968: Magnar Pettersen (Ap)
- 1968–1971: Trygve Olsen (Sp)
- 1971–1979: Bjørgvin Jenssen (Ap)
- 1979–1981: Oddvar J. Majala (Ap)
- 1981–1995: Arvid Mathisen (Ap)
- 1995–2009: Ingalill Olsen (Ap)
- 2009–2011: John Aase (Ap)
- 2011–2014: Anne Karin Olli (H)
- 2014–2017: Gudleif Kristiansen (Sp)
- 2017–2019: Reidun Helene Mortensen (Sp)
- 2019–2023: Bernth Sjursen (Ap)
- 2023–present: Ingrid Majala (LL)

== Geography ==
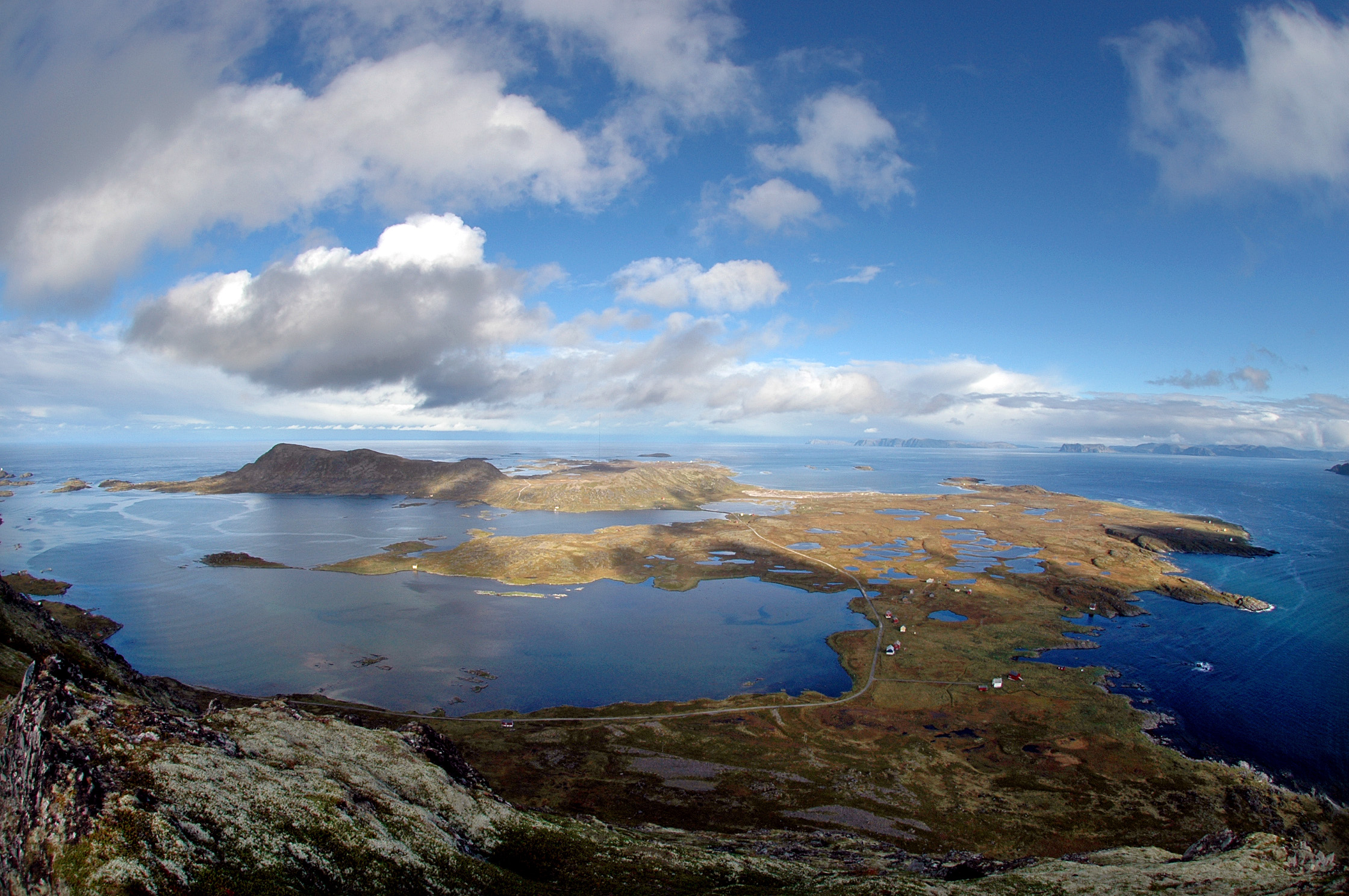
View of Ingøya

The municipality is located on the northern coast of western Finnmark, comprising parts of the mainland (located on the Porsanger Peninsula) and many islands of various sizes. The main islands include Måsøya, Hjelmsøya, Havøya, Ingøya, and Rolvsøya. Most people live in the village of Havøysund, but there are also small hamlets spread around the islands and in the fjord areas, notably Snefjord, Slåtten, Ingøy, Gunnarnes, and Måsøy. The large lake Havvatnet lies in the southern part of the municipality. The highest point in the municipality is the 633.7-metre (2,079 ft) tall mountain Gárdevárri.

=== Birdlife ===
Lying in the northwest part of the county, Måsøy has a selection of habitats and a varied birdlife. Once again, some of the county's largest seabird colonies can be found in the municipality with the island of Hjelmsøya being one of the more interesting. White-tailed eagles can be seen as well as both Arctic skuas and great skuas.

=== Climate ===
Måsøy has a subpolar oceanic climate (Köppen climate classification: Cfc), due to the relatively mild winter, but also due to the precipitation pattern with drier summer and wetter winter, which is opposite of the subarctic climate. Fruholmen was earlier a tundra climate, and is close to tundra with 1991-2020 normals. As the weather station is located at an exposed lighthouse, the inhabited areas of the municipality such as Havøysund will be slightly warmer in summer and slightly colder in winter than Fruholmen.

Climate data for Fruholmen lighthouse 1991-2020 (13 m), extremes 1980-present
Month	Jan	Feb	Mar	Apr	May	Jun	Jul	Aug	Sep	Oct	Nov	Dec	Year
Record high °C (°F)	8.4 (47.1)	9.6 (49.3)	12 (54)	13.4 (56.1)	20.8 (69.4)	24.8 (76.6)	28.6 (83.5)	25.5 (77.9)	22.2 (72.0)	17.3 (63.1)	11.2 (52.2)	12.1 (53.8)	28.6 (83.5)
Mean daily maximum °C (°F)	0.9 (33.6)	0.5 (32.9)	1.2 (34.2)	3 (37)	6.2 (43.2)	8.9 (48.0)	12.2 (54.0)	12.1 (53.8)	10 (50)	6 (43)	3.7 (38.7)	2.2 (36.0)	5.6 (42.0)
Daily mean °C (°F)	−1.1 (30.0)	−1.6 (29.1)	−0.7 (30.7)	1.3 (34.3)	4.3 (39.7)	6.9 (44.4)	9.8 (49.6)	10.1 (50.2)	8.2 (46.8)	4.4 (39.9)	1.8 (35.2)	0.3 (32.5)	3.6 (38.5)
Mean daily minimum °C (°F)	−3.1 (26.4)	−3.5 (25.7)	−2.5 (27.5)	−0.3 (31.5)	2.6 (36.7)	5.4 (41.7)	8.2 (46.8)	8.5 (47.3)	6.7 (44.1)	2.8 (37.0)	0.1 (32.2)	−1.6 (29.1)	1.9 (35.5)
Record low °C (°F)	−20.7 (−5.3)	−16.7 (1.9)	−14.0 (6.8)	−12.9 (8.8)	−12.0 (10.4)	−1.0 (30.2)	0.8 (33.4)	1.0 (33.8)	−1.1 (30.0)	−4.5 (23.9)	−9.5 (14.9)	−12.3 (9.9)	−20.7 (−5.3)
Average precipitation mm (inches)	100 (3.9)	89 (3.5)	86 (3.4)	61 (2.4)	48 (1.9)	40 (1.6)	50 (2.0)	55 (2.2)	72 (2.8)	93 (3.7)	81 (3.2)	98 (3.9)	873 (34.5)
Source 1: Norwegian Meteorological Institute
Source 2: infoclimat.fr

Climate data for Ingøya 1961-1990
Month	Jan	Feb	Mar	Apr	May	Jun	Jul	Aug	Sep	Oct	Nov	Dec	Year
Mean daily maximum °C (°F)	−0.4 (31.3)	−0.4 (31.3)	0.2 (32.4)	1.9 (35.4)	5.3 (41.5)	8.9 (48.0)	12.0 (53.6)	11.7 (53.1)	8.8 (47.8)	5.2 (41.4)	2.3 (36.1)	0.5 (32.9)	4.7 (40.5)
Daily mean °C (°F)	−2.4 (27.7)	−2.4 (27.7)	−1.5 (29.3)	0.4 (32.7)	3.6 (38.5)	6.7 (44.1)	9.7 (49.5)	9.7 (49.5)	7.2 (45.0)	3.6 (38.5)	0.6 (33.1)	−1.4 (29.5)	2.8 (37.0)
Mean daily minimum °C (°F)	−4.4 (24.1)	−4.4 (24.1)	−3.2 (26.2)	−1.3 (29.7)	1.9 (35.4)	5.0 (41.0)	7.9 (46.2)	8.1 (46.6)	5.7 (42.3)	2.1 (35.8)	−1.1 (30.0)	−3.3 (26.1)	1.1 (34.0)
Average precipitation mm (inches)	88 (3.5)	74 (2.9)	70 (2.8)	61 (2.4)	44 (1.7)	46 (1.8)	49 (1.9)	52 (2.0)	64 (2.5)	89 (3.5)	91 (3.6)	102 (4.0)	830 (32.7)
Average precipitation days (≥ 1 mm)	17.9	15.6	15.8	14.5	11.3	10.5	10.0	11.0	14.6	19.2	18.0	19.4	177.8
Source: Norwegian Meteorological Institute

== Notable people ==
- Johannes Olai Olsen (1895 in Måsøy – 1974), a fisherman and mayor of Måsøy from 1928 to 1940
- Lorentz Eldjarn (1920 in Måsøy – 2007), a biochemist and medical doctor
- Selmer Nilsen (1931 in Bakfjord – 1991), a fisherman who spied for the GRU during the Cold War
- Aagot Vinterbo-Hohr (born 1936 in Måsøy), a Norwegian-Sami physician and writer
- Markus Svendsen (born 1941 in Havøysund), a skier who competed at the 1968 Winter Olympics
- Hanne Grete Einarsen (born 1966), a Norwegian-Sami artist who lives in Snefjord
