= Ingalill Olsen =

Norwegian politician

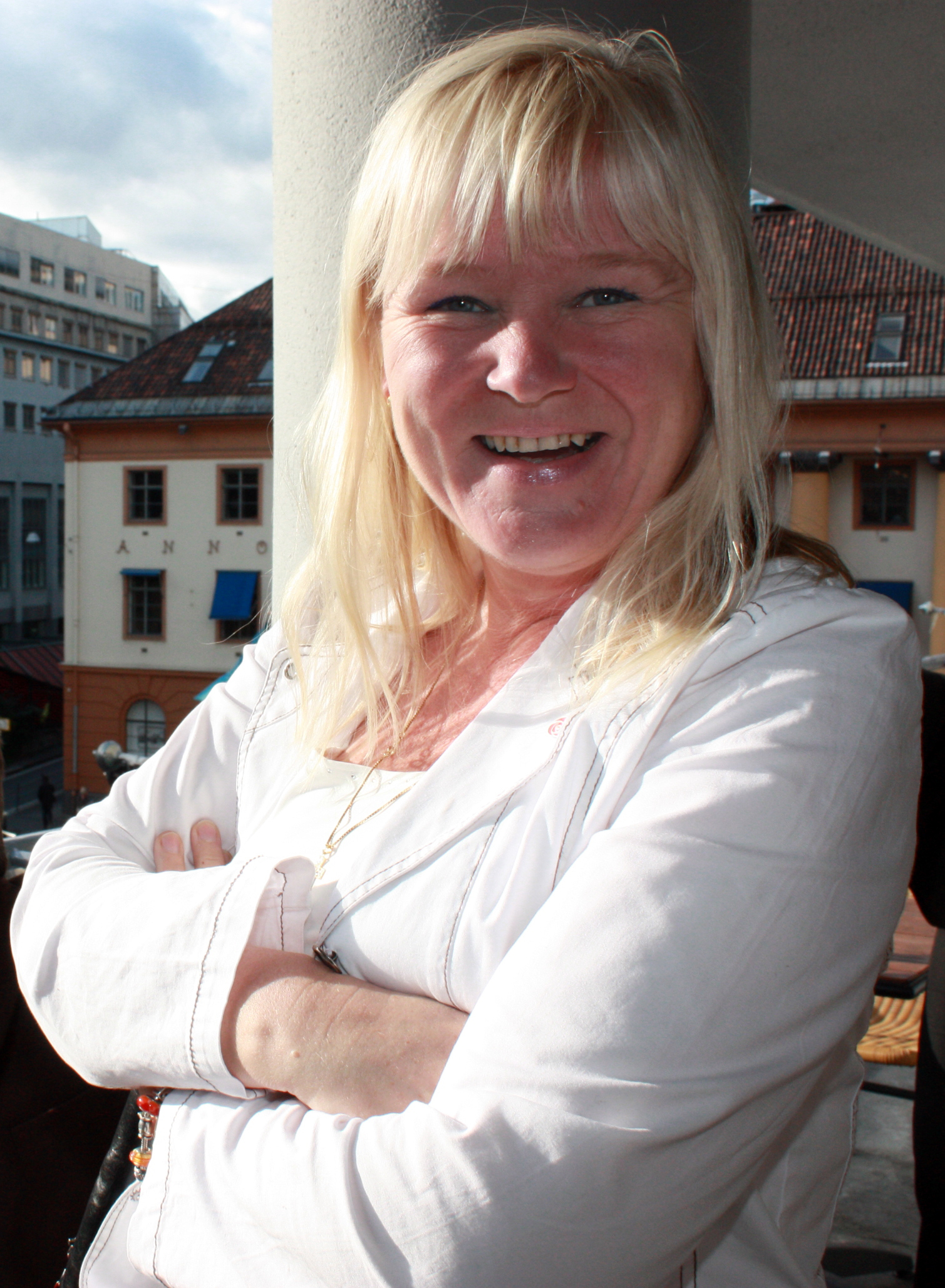
- Born: 15 December 1955 (age 70); Måsøy, Norway
- Education: University of Tromsø
- Occupations: Schoolteacher and politician
- Political party: Labour Party

Ingalill Olsen (born 15 December 1955) is a Norwegian schoolteacher and politician for the Norwegian Labour Party (Arbeiderpartiet).

She served as mayor of Måsøy Municipality for several periods, from 1995 to 2009. She was a member of the Storting for two periods, from 2009 to 2013, and from 2017 to 2021.

== Personal life ==
Born in Måsøy Municipality in Finnmark on 15 December 1955, Olsen is a daughter of fisherman and fishing boat owner Trygve Olsen and Alfhild Kremmervik.

== Education and early career ==
Olsen was educated as teacher at Høgskolen i Finnmark in Alta from 1976 to 1980. She worked as schoolteacher in Havøysund from 1980 to 1986. She studied school development and administration at the University of Tromsø from 1985 to 1986, and from 1986 to 1987 she studied at the Statens lærerhøgskole i forming, Oslo (now a part of the Oslo Metropolitan University), specializing in tapestry. From 1987 to 1995 she was assigned as pedagogical consultant in the municipality of Måsøy.

== Political career ==
=== Local politics ===
Taking part in local politics, Olsen was a board member of the Finnmark chapter of the Labour Party from 1983 to 1989. She was a member of the municipal council of Måsøy Municipality from 1987 to 1991, and from 1991 to 1995, and served as mayor of Måsøy Municipality from 1995 to 2009.

=== Parliament ===
She was elected to the Norwegian Parliament from Finnmark in 2009. In the Storting, she was a member of the Standing Committee on Local Government and Public Administration from 2009 to 2013.

She was elected first deputy from Finnmark in 2013, and again elected as ordinary representative to the Storting in 2017. From 2017 to 2021 she was a member of the Standing Committee on Transport and Communications.

From 2009 to 2013 she was a member of the Storting delegation for Arctic parliamentary cooperation. She was a member of the Storting delegation to the Nordic Council for the period 2017 to 2021, and a delegate to the United Nations General Assembly for the period 2019 to 2020.
