= Havvannet =

Lake in Måsøy, Norway

Havvannet (Norwegian); Vuolit Áhpelanjávri (Northern Sami)
- Interactive map of the lake
- Location: Måsøy Municipality, Finnmark
- Coordinates: 70.6799°N 24.8410°E
- Basin countries: Norway
- Max. length: 4 kilometres (2.5 mi)
- Max. width: 1.7 kilometres (1.1 mi)
- Surface area: 3.69 km^{2} (1.42 sq mi)
- Shore length^{1}: 15.53 kilometres (9.65 mi)
- Surface elevation: 293 metres (961 ft)
- References: NVE
- ^{1} Shore length is not a well-defined measure.

Havvannet (Norwegian) or Vuolit Áhpelanjávri (Northern Sami) is a lake in Måsøy Municipality in Finnmark county, Norway. The 3.69 square kilometres (1.42 sq mi) lake lies isolated in the mountains on the Porsanger Peninsula about 9 kilometres (5.6 mi) northeast of the village of Kokelv in Hammerfest Municipality. The lake sits at an elevation of 293-metre (961 ft) above sea level. The village of Slåtten lies about 14 kilometres (8.7 mi) northwest of the lake.

== See also ==
- List of lakes in Norway
