= Havøysund Church =

- Havøysund kirke
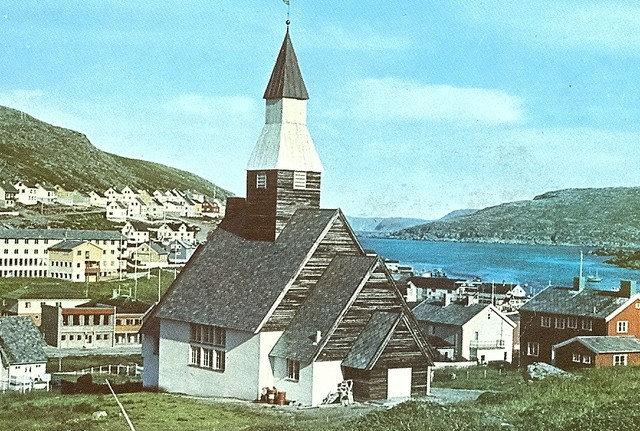
- View of the church
- Havøysund Church
- 70.996442°N 24.656821°E
- Location: Måsøy Municipality, Finnmark
- Country: Norway
- Denomination: Church of Norway
- Churchmanship: Evangelical Lutheran

History
- Status: Parish church
- Founded: 1960
- Consecrated: 1960

Architecture
- Functional status: Active
- Architect: Esben Poulsson
- Architectural type: Long church
- Completed: 1960 (66 years ago)

Specifications
- Capacity: 300
- Materials: Concrete and wood

Administration
- Diocese: Nord-Hålogaland
- Deanery: Hammerfest prosti
- Parish: Måsøy
- Norwegian Cultural Heritage Site
- Type: Church
- Status: Not protected
- ID: 84511

Havøysund Church (Norwegian: Havøysund kirke) is a parish church of the Church of Norway in Måsøy Municipality in Finnmark county, Norway. It is located in the village of Havøysund on the island of Havøya. It is one of the churches for the Måsøy parish which is part of the Hammerfest prosti (deanery) in the Diocese of Nord-Hålogaland.

Like most other churches in Finnmark, Havøysund church was burned down by the Germans during the evacuation of Finnmark in 1944. The new church was built of whitewashed concrete and dark wooden timbers in a long church style in 1960 using plans drawn up by the architect Esben Poulsson. The altarpiece and pulpit decoration were painted by the artist Terje Grøstad. The church seats about 300 people.

== Media gallery ==
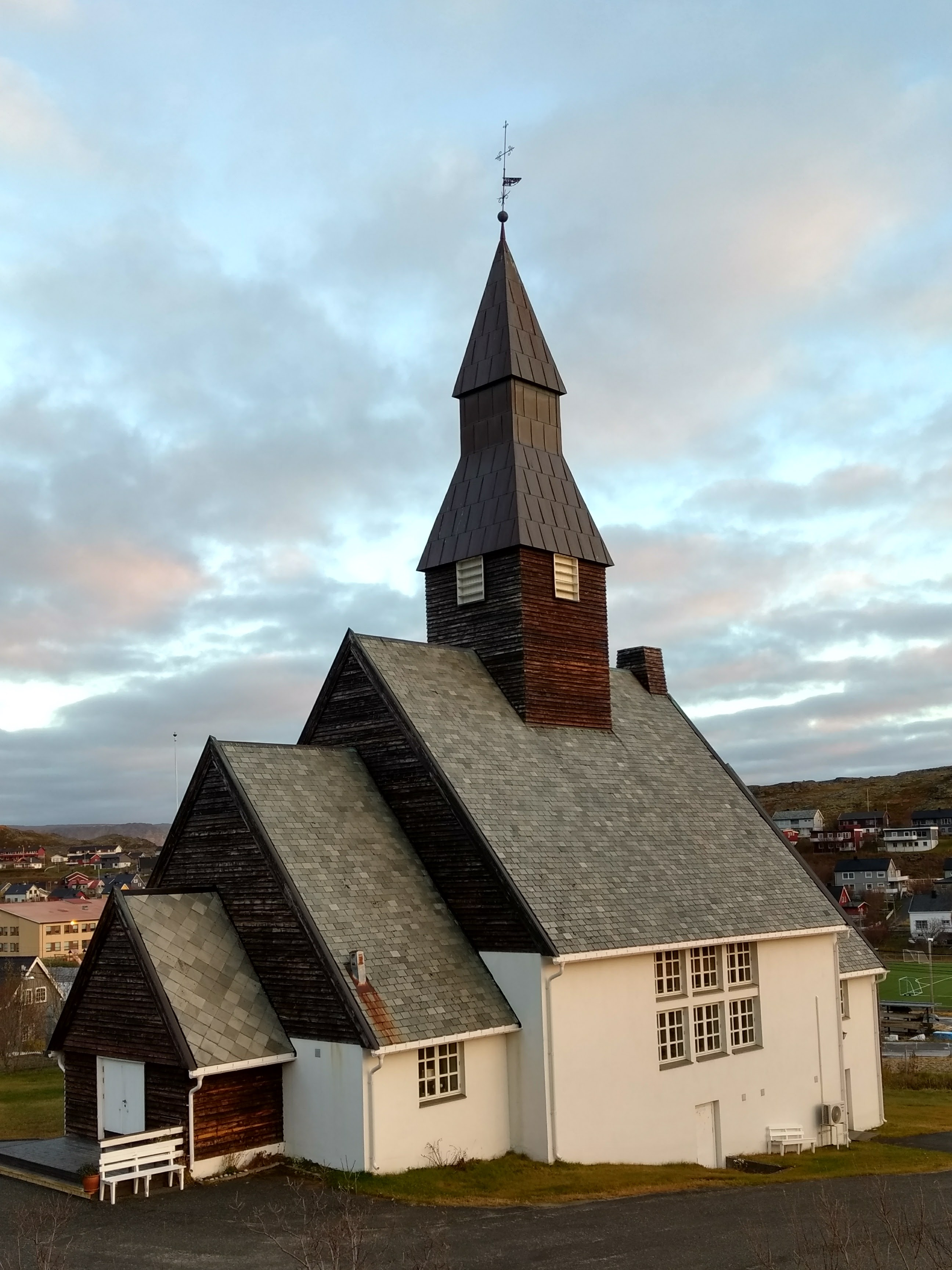

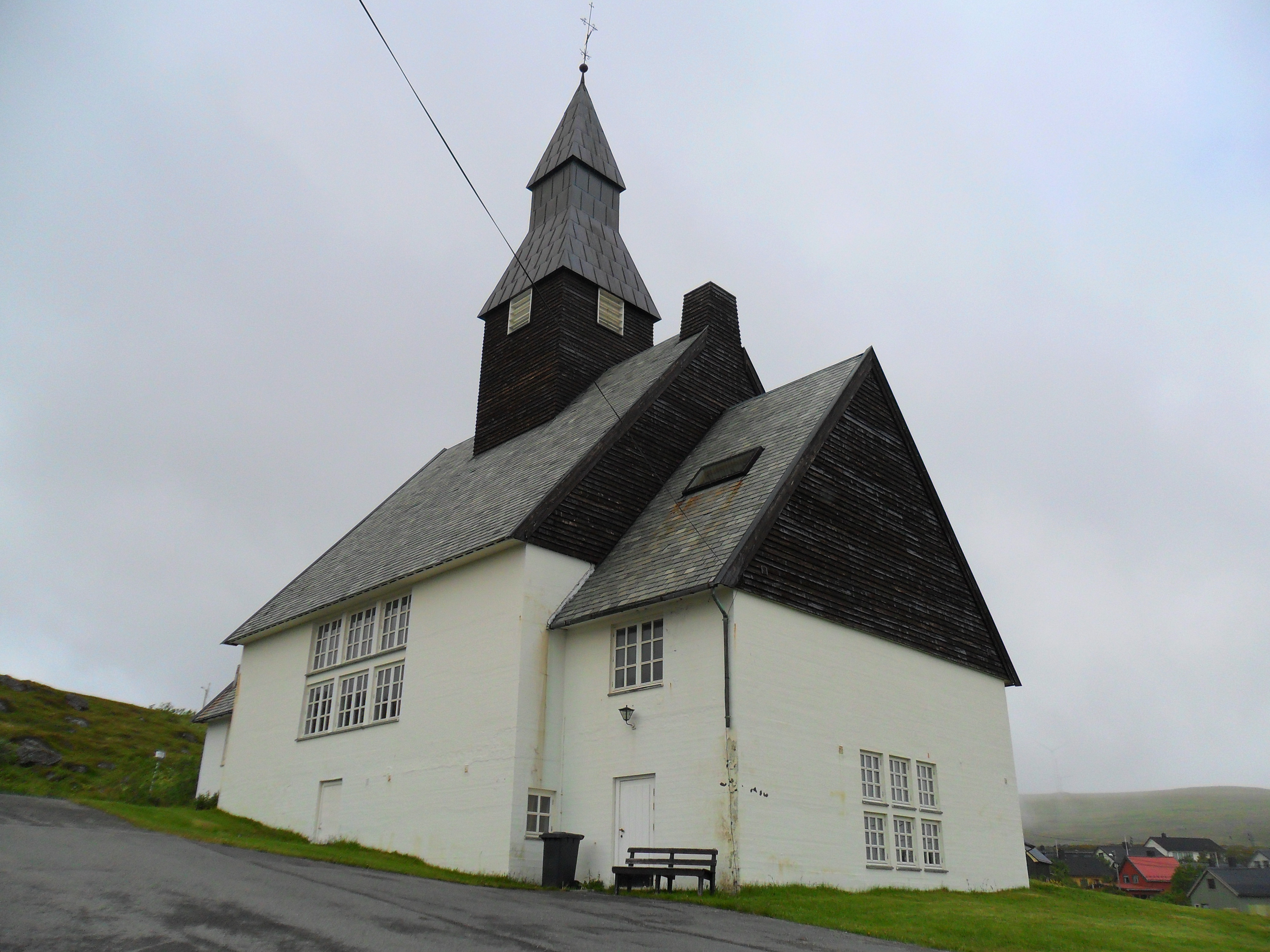

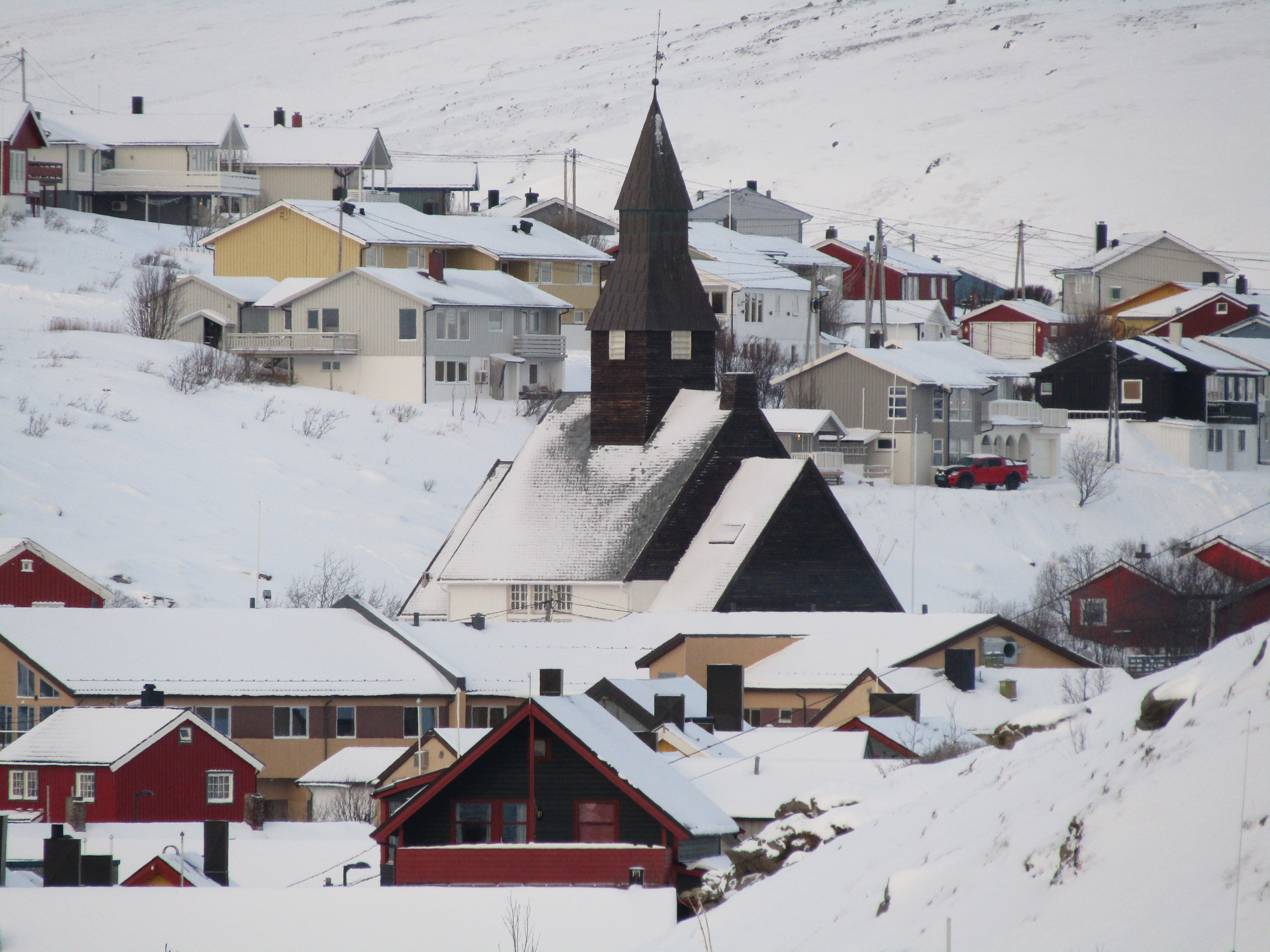

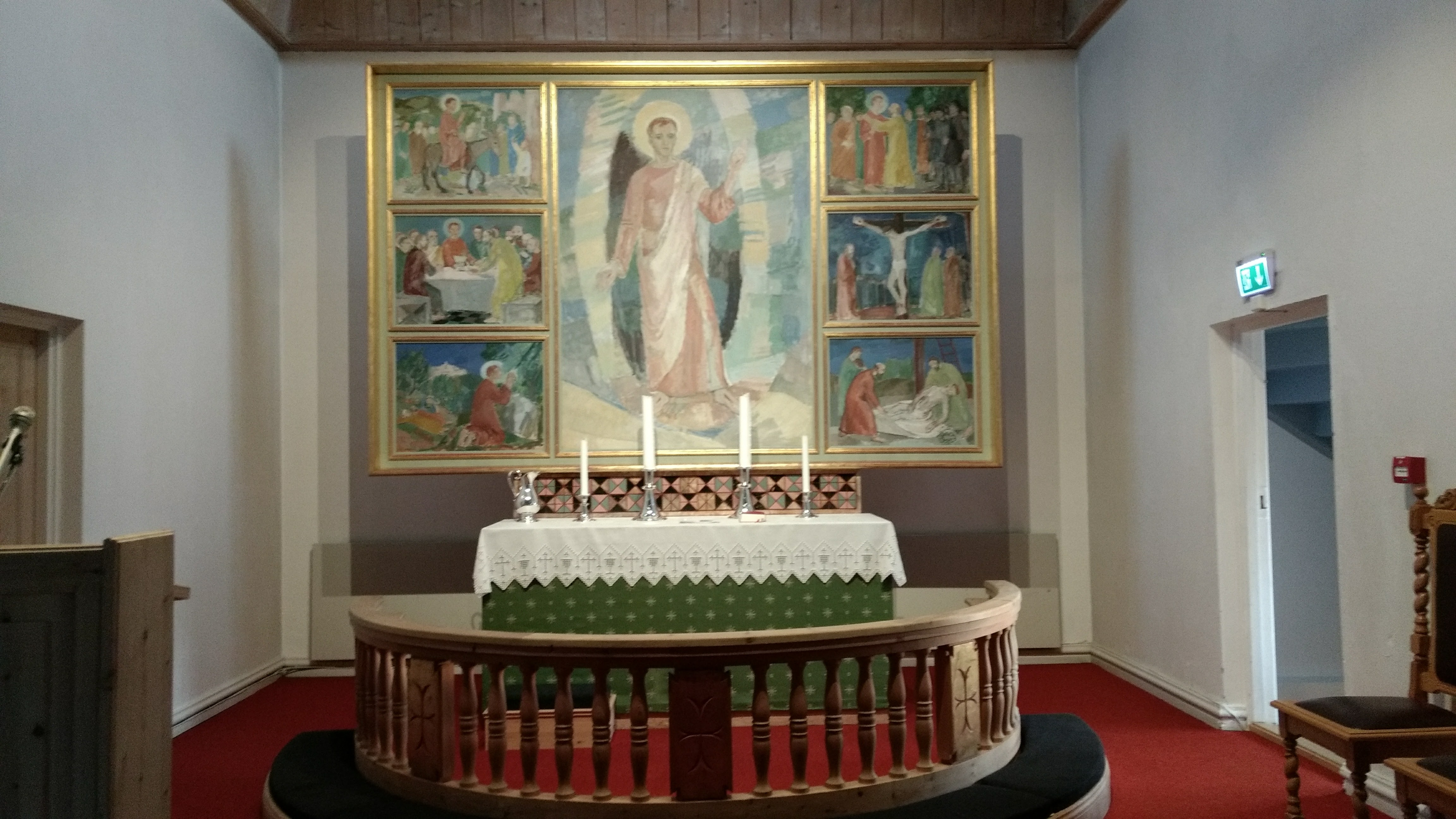

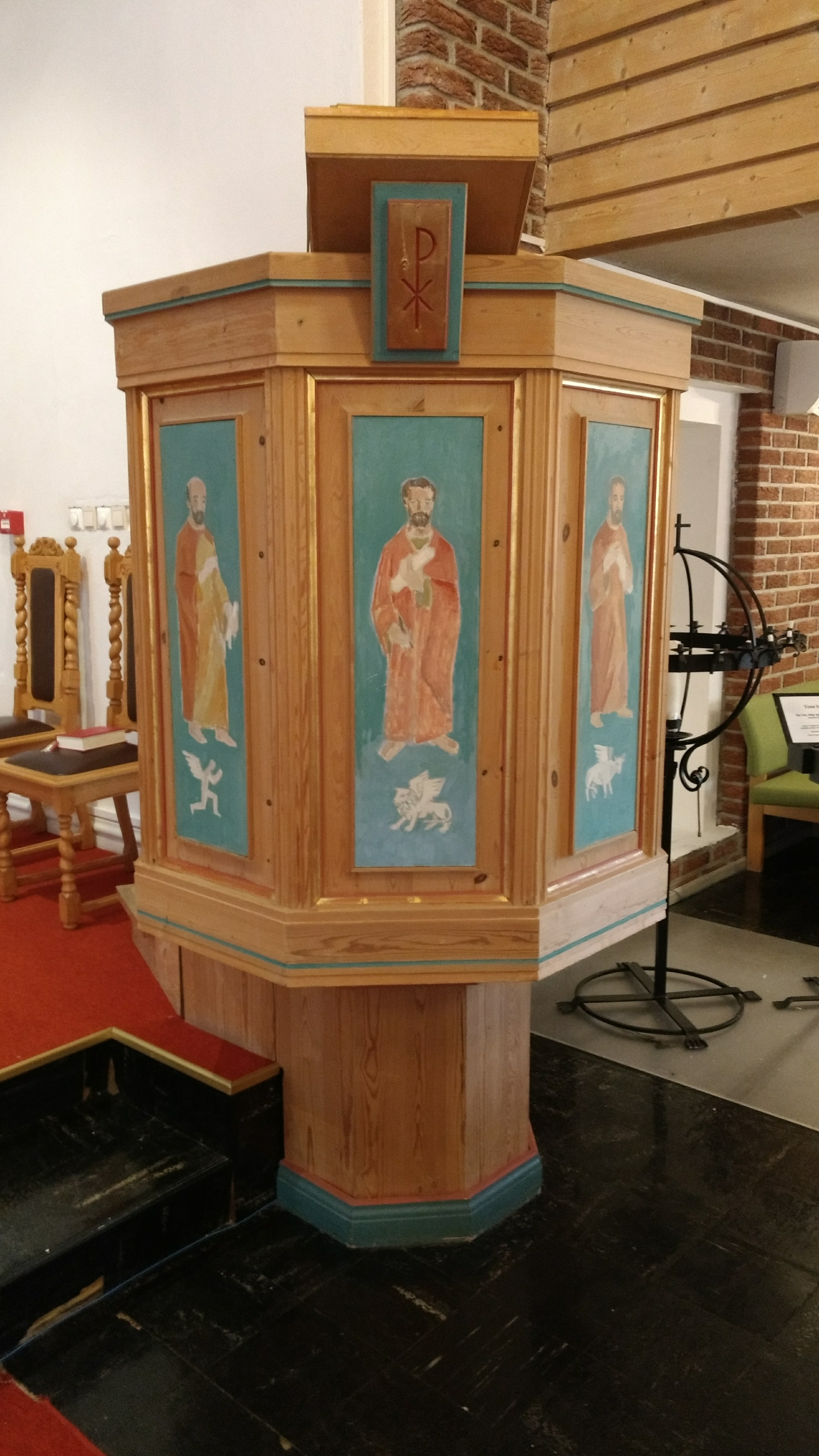

== See also ==
- List of churches in Nord-Hålogaland
