= Slåtten =

Village in Måsøy, Norway

Slåtten: Slåtten (Norwegian); Muotki (Northern Sami)
- Village
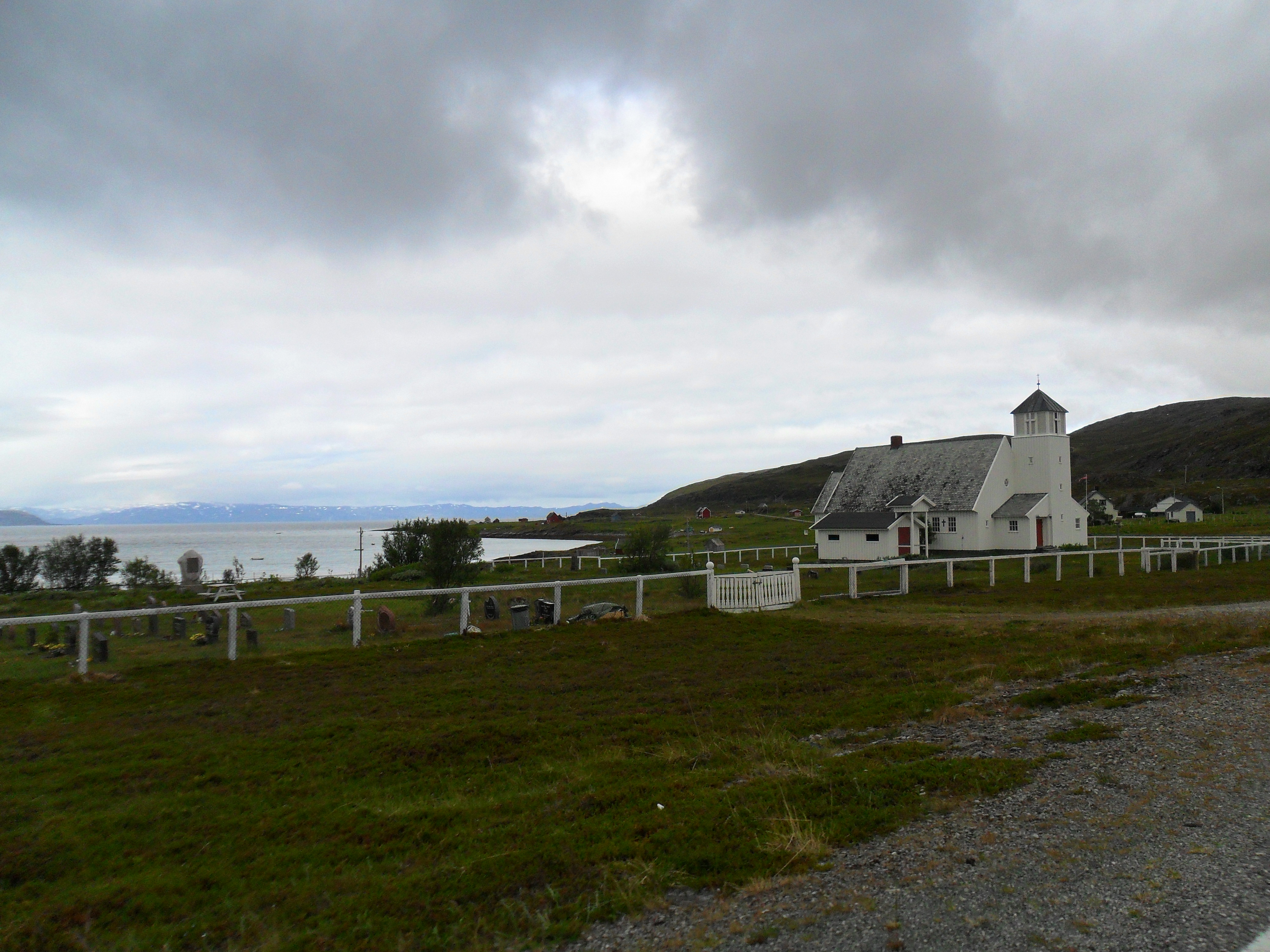
- View of the village church
- Interactive map of Slåtten
- Location within Finnmark Location within Norway
- Coordinates: 70.74968°N 24.51461°E
- Country: Norway
- Region: Northern Norway
- County: Finnmark
- District: Vest-Finnmark
- Municipality: Måsøy Municipality
- Elevation: 13 m (43 ft)
- Time zone: UTC+01:00 (CET)
  - Summer (DST): UTC+02:00 (CEST)
- Post Code: 9714 Snefjord

Slåtten (Norwegian) or Muotki (Northern Sami) is a village in Måsøy Municipality in Finnmark county, Norway. The village is located along the Revsbotn fjord, along Norwegian County Road 889. It is located about 25 kilometres (16 mi) north of the village of Kokelv and about 40 kilometres (25 mi) south of Havøysund. Slotten Church is located in this very small village (the church uses the spelling Slotten, while the village's official spelling is Slåtten).
