= Johannes Olai Olsen =

Norwegian fisher and politician (1895–1974)

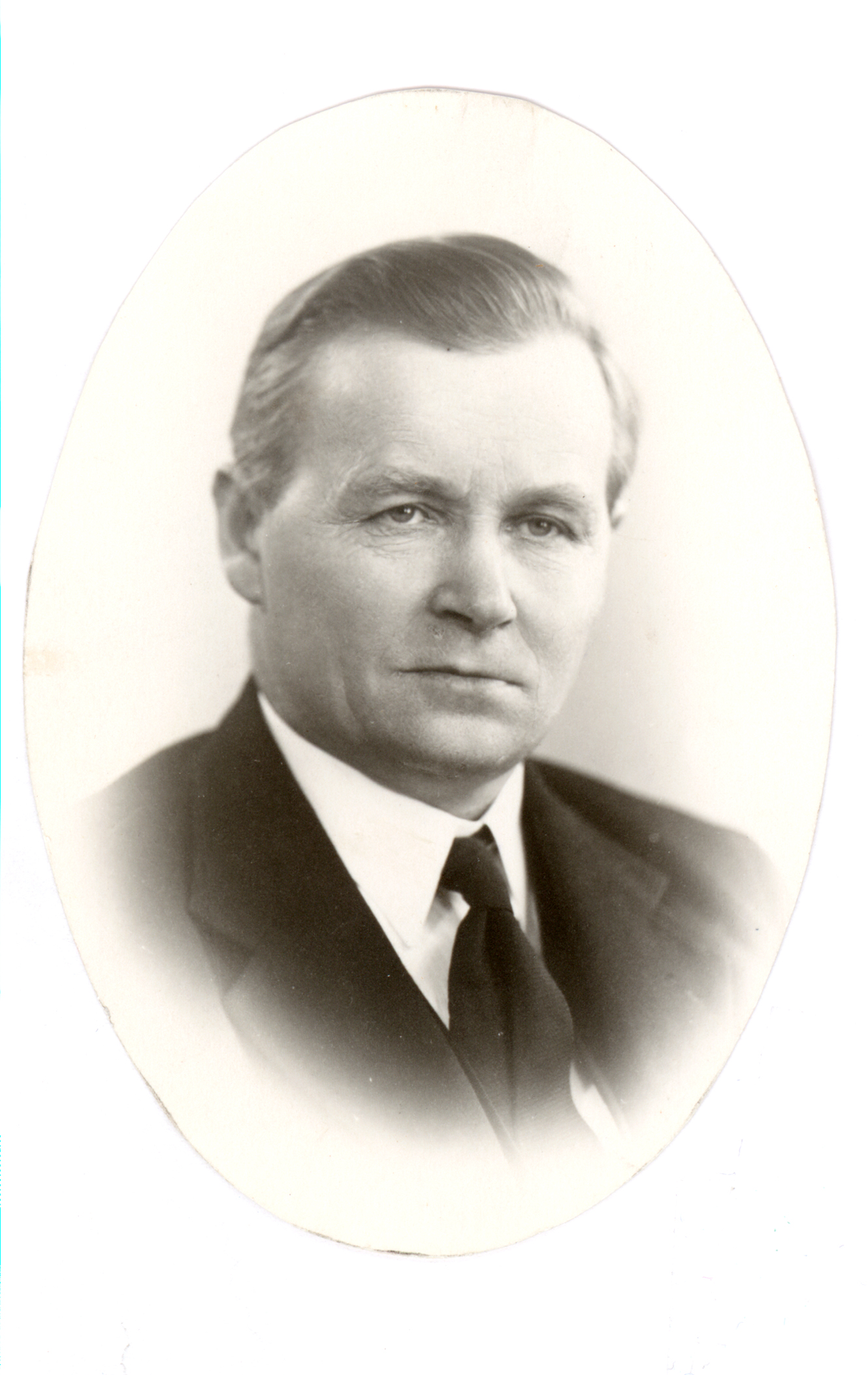

Johannes Olai Olsen (3 October 1895 – 16 January 1974) was a Norwegian fisher and politician for the Labour Party.

He was born in Måsøy Municipality.

He was elected to the Norwegian Parliament from Finnmark in 1945, and was re-elected on four occasions.

Olsen was mayor of Måsøy Municipality between 1928 and 1946, with the exception of a period between 1940 and 1945, during the German occupation of Norway. He was also a long-time member of Finnmark county council.

His son Trygve Olsen later became mayor of Måsøy, as well as a cabinet member.
