= Slotten Church =

- Slotten kirke / Slåtten kirke
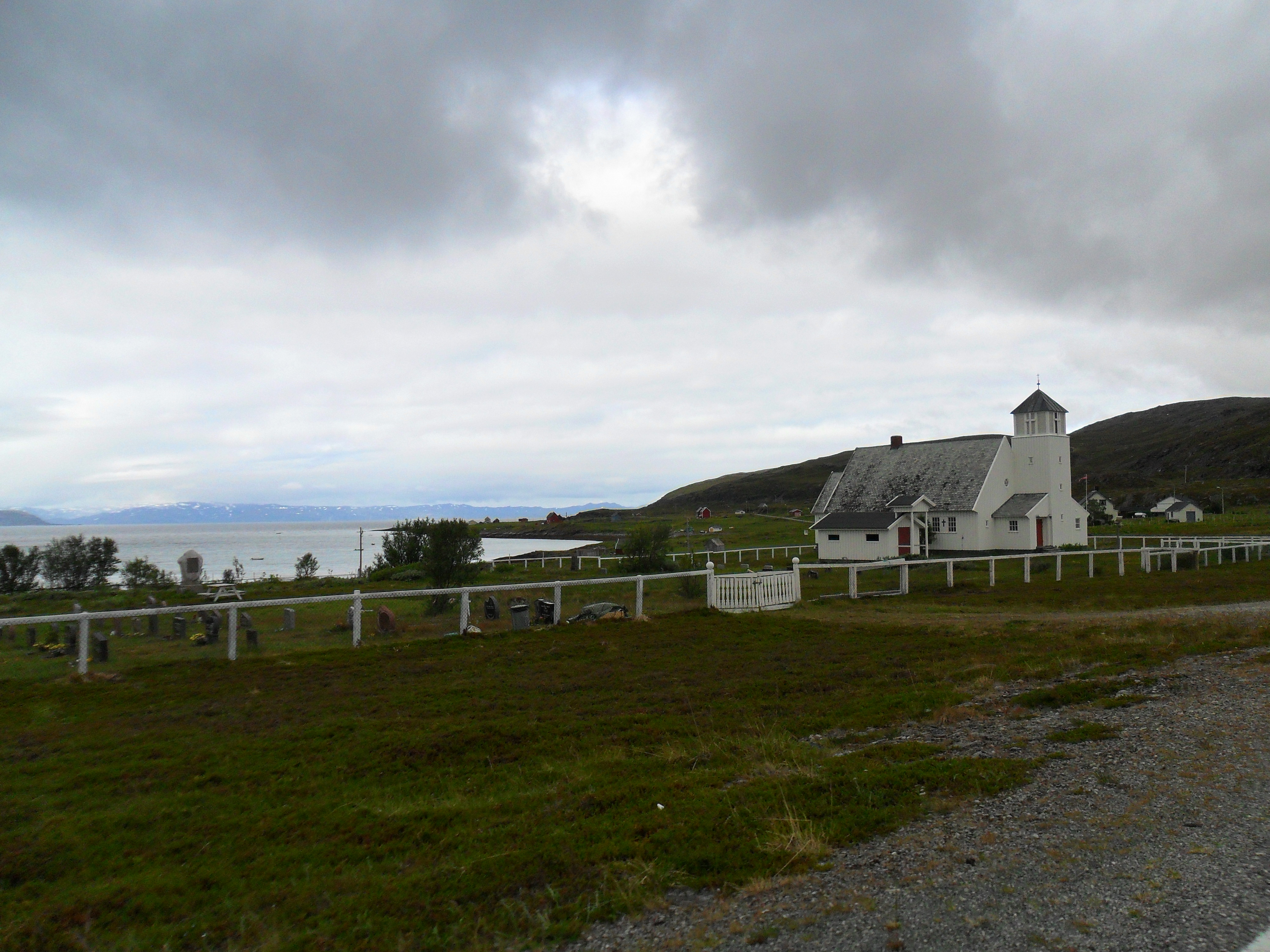
- View of the church
- Slotten Church
- 70.750616°N 24.533088°E
- Location: Måsøy Municipality, Finnmark
- Country: Norway
- Denomination: Church of Norway
- Churchmanship: Evangelical Lutheran

History
- Status: Parish church
- Founded: 1896
- Consecrated: 1965

Architecture
- Functional status: Active
- Architect: Rolf Harlew Jenssen
- Architectural type: Long church
- Completed: 1965 (61 years ago)

Specifications
- Capacity: 100
- Materials: Wood

Administration
- Diocese: Nord-Hålogaland
- Deanery: Hammerfest prosti
- Parish: Måsøy
- Norwegian Cultural Heritage Site
- Type: Church
- Status: Not protected
- ID: 85501

Slotten Church (Norwegian: Slotten kirke; Slåtten kirke) is a parish church of the Church of Norway in Måsøy Municipality in Finnmark county, Norway. It is located in the village of Slåtten on the mainland part of the island municipality. It is one of the churches for the Måsøy parish which is part of the Hammerfest prosti (deanery) in the Diocese of Nord-Hålogaland. The white, wooden church was built in a long church style in 1963 using plans drawn up by the architect Rolf Harlew Jenssen. The church seats about 100 people.

== History ==
The first church in Slåtten was built in 1896 when an older church (from 1763) from Kvalsund was moved to Slåtten and rebuilt. That church was used in Slåtten until 1944 when the retreating German army burned it to the ground. The church was rebuilt after the war. The new building was consecrated in 1965.

== Media gallery ==
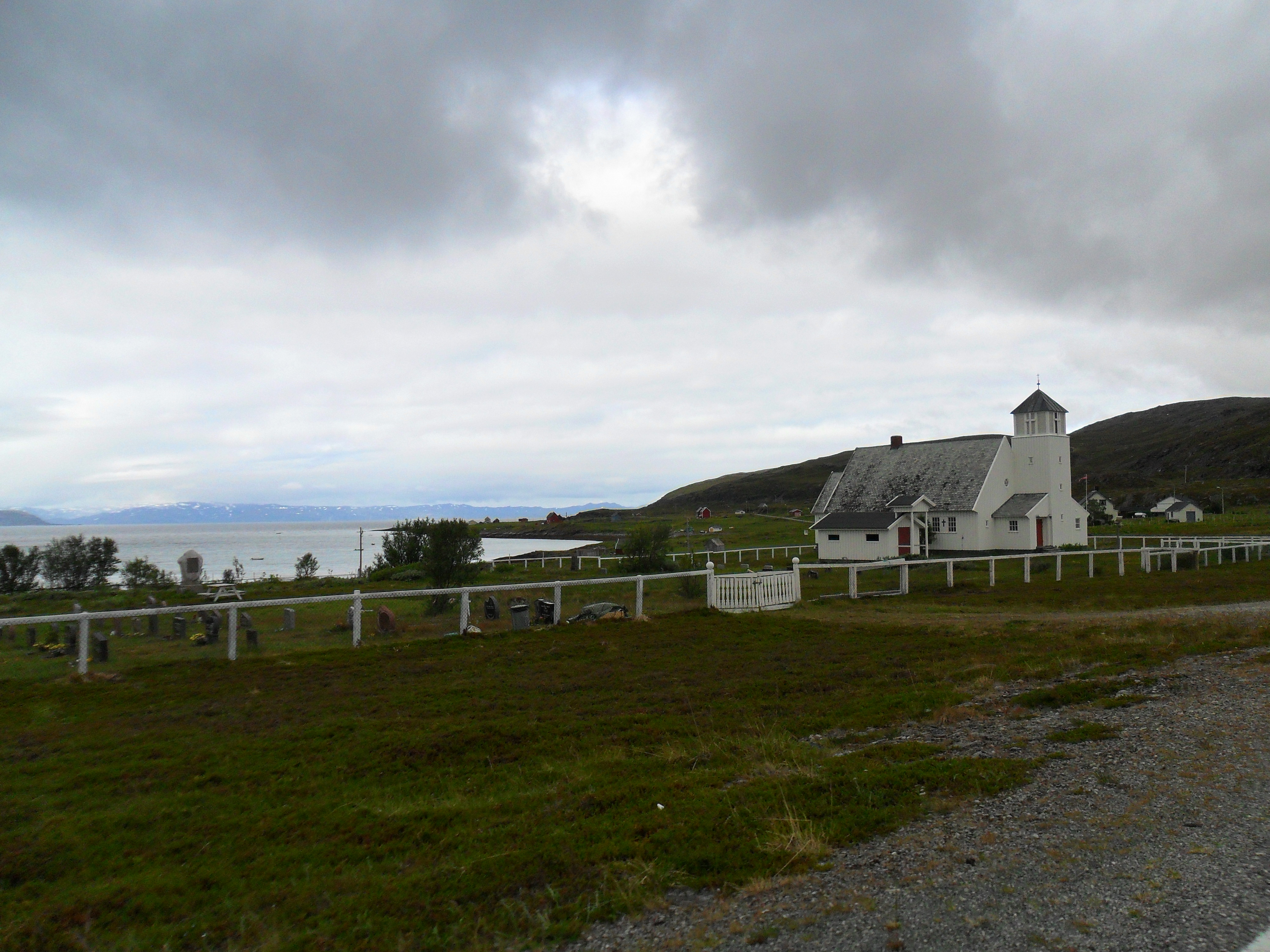

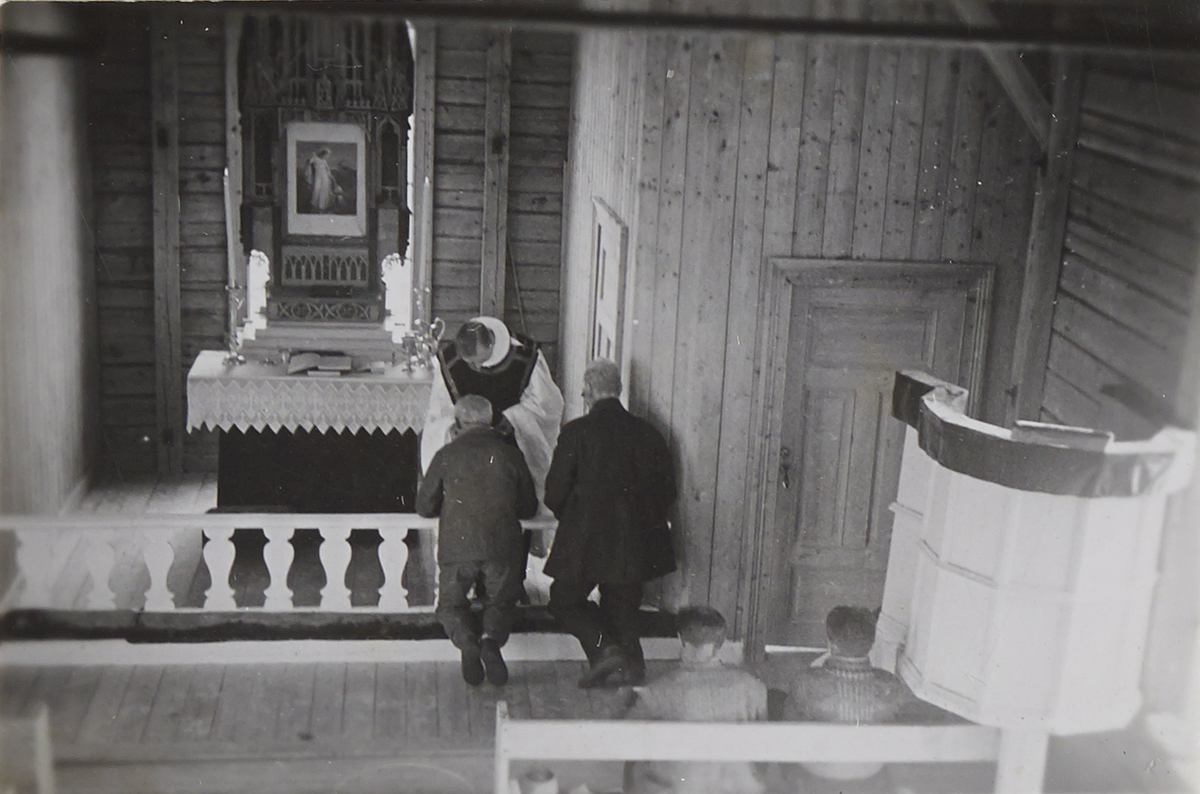

== See also ==
- List of churches in Nord-Hålogaland
