= Fruholmen Lighthouse =

Coastal lighthouse in Norway

Fruholmen Lighthouse Fruholmen fyrstasjon
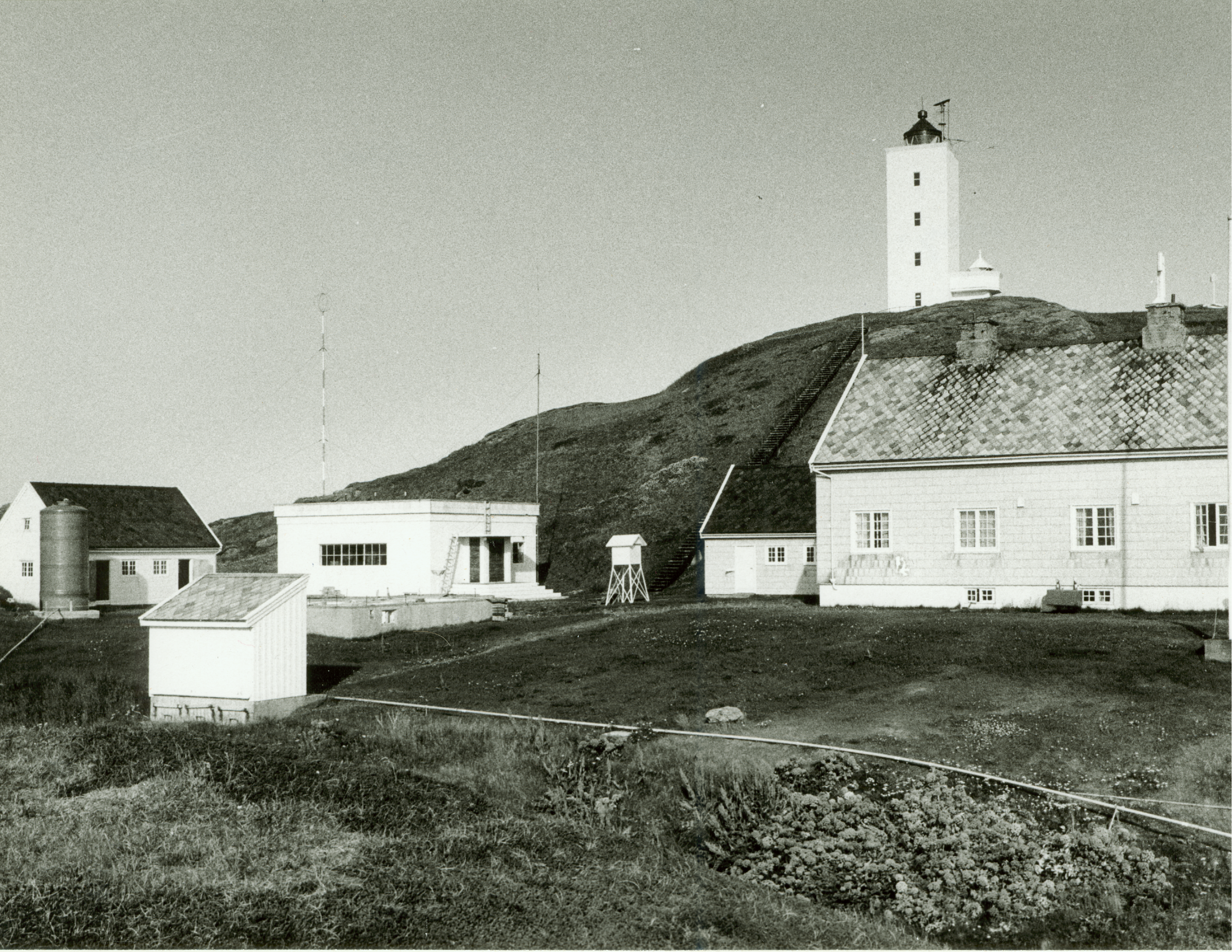
- View of the lighthouse
- Location of the lighthouse
- Location: Finnmark, Norway
- Coordinates: 71°05′37″N 23°59′01″E

Tower
- Constructed: 1866 (first)
- Construction: Concrete
- Automated: 2006
- Height: 18 metres (59 ft)
- Shape: Square tower
- Markings: White with red top
- Fog signal: none
- Racon: O (- - -)

Light
- First lit: 1949 (current)
- Focal height: 47.7 metres (156 ft)
- Intensity: 2,061,000 candela
- Range: 16.1 nmi (29.8 km; 18.5 mi)
- Characteristic: Fl W 20s
- Norway no.: 934500

Fruholmen Lighthouse (Norwegian: Fruholmen fyr, former name Norskholmen fyr) is a coastal lighthouse located in Måsøy Municipality in Finnmark county, Norway. It sits on a tiny islet just off the northern coast of the island of Ingøya.

== History ==
The lighthouse was established in 1866 and it is the northernmost lighthouse in Norway. This is the first of the three major lighthouses that guide ships around the North Cape into the Barents Sea. The original cast iron lighthouse was destroyed during World War II.

The current lighthouse was completed in 1949. The 18-metre (59 ft) tall square white concrete tower has a red lantern on top, which flashes white every 20 seconds. Lower down, there is a secondary light that flashes white, red or green light depending on direction, occulting three times every 10 seconds.

== See also ==
- Lighthouses in Norway
- List of lighthouses in Norway
