= Ingøy =

- Village
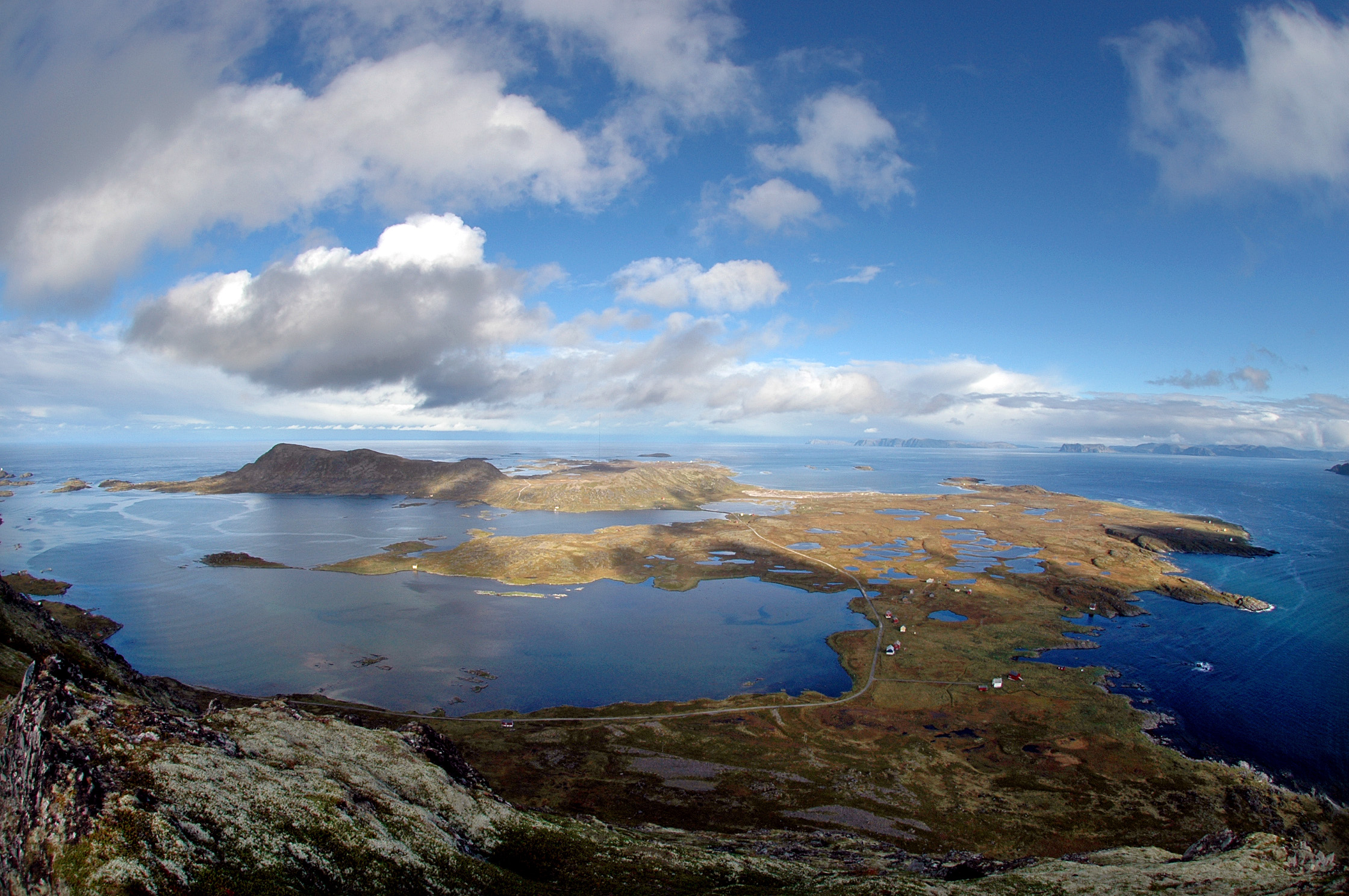
- Interactive map of Ingøy
- Location within Finnmark Location within Norway
- Coordinates: 71°05′03″N 24°03′29″E
- Country: Norway
- Region: Northern Norway
- County: Finnmark
- District: Vest-Finnmark
- Municipality: Måsøy Municipality
- Elevation: 4 m (13 ft)
- Time zone: UTC+01:00 (CET)
  - Summer (DST): UTC+02:00 (CEST)
- Post Code: 9672 Ingøy

Ingøy or Inga is a small fishing village on the island of Ingøya in Måsøy Municipality, Finnmark county, Norway. The village lies on the northern coast of the island of Ingøya, facing the open Atlantic Ocean. The village of Ingøy lies about 60 kilometres (30 nautical miles) west of the famous North Cape. The village is accessible by boat from the nearby village of Havøysund and the city of Hammerfest. Ingøy Church is located in the village.

The Ingøy radio transmitter is located about two kilometres (1 1/4 mi) south of Ingøy. The mast of the longwave transmitter is the tallest structure in Norway and in all of Scandinavia. In 2019 NRK shut down its long wave signals, and the mast is no longer in use. The fish processing plant owned by the Fjordlaks Company closed down in 2016, in order to focus all its business at Rolvsøya, the neighbour island. Despite interest from potential buyers, Fjordlaks refused to sell the fish plant to avoid competition.

The village of Ingøy dates back to the 14th century, perhaps earlier. Around 1520, there were about 300 residents living in the village. During the 17th century, the population declined dramatically and it has stayed sparsely populated since that time. During the fishing seasons, however, the population would increase temporarily.
