= Gunnarnes =

Village in Måsøy, Norway

- Village
- Interactive map of Gunnarnes
- Location within Finnmark Location within Norway
- Coordinates: 70.99828°N 24.11648°E
- Country: Norway
- Region: Northern Norway
- County: Finnmark
- District: Vest-Finnmark
- Municipality: Måsøy Municipality
- Elevation: 6 m (20 ft)
- Time zone: UTC+01:00 (CET)
  - Summer (DST): UTC+02:00 (CEST)
- Post Code: 9670 Tufjord

Gunnarnes is a seaside village on the island of Rolvsøya in Måsøy Municipality in Finnmark county, Norway. There is a ferry between Gunnarnes and Havøysund. The village lies about 20 kilometres (12 mi) west of Havøysund. Gunnarnes Chapel is located in the village.

== Climate ==
Its climate is subarctic. The average annual temperature is 1.46 °C (34.63 °F). The coldest month is February, with an average of temperature of −12.38 °C (9.72 °F). The hottest month is July, with an average temperature of 16.48 °C (61.66 °F). The wettest month is July with 99.11 millimetres (3.902 in) of precipitation. The driest month is October, with 51.22 millimetres (2.017 in) of precipitation.
