= Selmer Nilsen =

Norwegian spy for the Soviet Union

Sverre Ingebregt Selmer Nilsen
- Born: 25 May 1931; Bakfjord in Måsøy, Norway
- Died: 18 June 1991 (aged 60)

Sverre Ingebregt Selmer Nilsen (25 May 1931 – 18 June 1991) was a Norwegian fisherman spying for the GRU during the Cold War.

== Biography ==
He was active in Bodø from 1956 to 1963, and reported Bodø landings and take-offs of the American espionage plane Lockheed U-2 to the Soviet Union. These operations culminated with the U-2 Crisis of 1960, when one of the U-2 planes was forced down over Soviet Union on 1 May 1960.

Nilsen, originally from Bakfjord in Måsøy Municipality in Finnmark, was recruited in 1948 after threats from Soviet agents towards his family. The 17-year-old boy was sent for training in the Soviet Union. He returned seven months later, with a radio transmitter and knowledge of telegraphy. After more than seventeen years as foreign agent he was arrested in 1967, and sentenced to seven and a half years imprisonment in a trial held behind closed doors in the court of Bodø. The conviction was eventually confirmed in the Supreme Court, in April–May 1968. He was however pardoned from further imprisonment after 3 years. The disclosure shocked Norway, as well as its NATO allies, as the espionage had been carried out through the peak of the Cold War. After the arrest, and the subsequent premature release, Nilsen spoke openly about his activities as an agent for the Soviet regime.

A televised documentary about Nilsen, featuring himself as the main story-teller, was shot in 1971, but was not broadcast on Norwegian television until December 2007. The documentary was originally stopped following discussions in the press, as well as between representatives from the Norwegian Broadcasting Corporation and the National Defense Administration.
