= Havøysund Bridge =

Bridge in Måsøy Municipality in Finnmark county, Norway

Havøysund Bridge Havøysundbrua
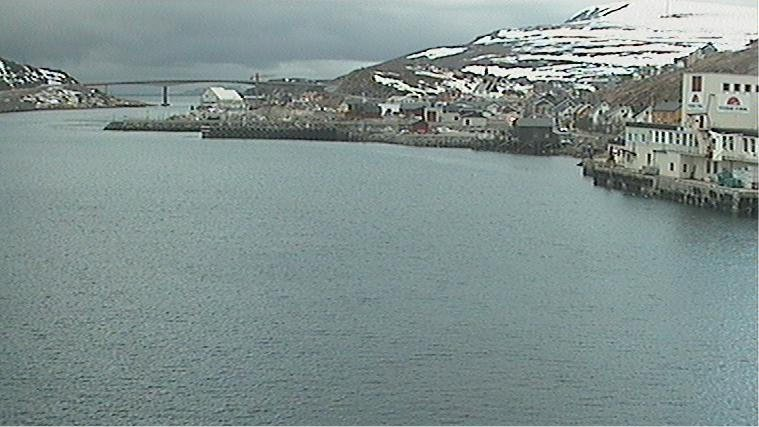
- View of the bridge
- Coordinates: 70.994167°N 24.647222°E
- Carries: Fv889
- Crosses: Havøysundet
- Locale: Måsøy Municipality, Norway

Characteristics
- Material: Prestressed concrete
- Total length: 293 metres (961 ft)
- Longest span: 124 metres (407 ft)

History
- Opened: 1986

The Havøysund Bridge (Norwegian: Havøysundbrua) is the world's northernmost bridge over 50 metres (160 ft) in length. It is a prestressed concrete cantilever bridge in Måsøy Municipality in Finnmark county, Norway. The bridge crosses the Havøysundet strait connecting the mainland to the fishing village of Havøysund on the island of Havøya. The bridge is 293 metres (961 ft) long and has a main span of 124 metres (407 ft). The Havøysund Bridge was opened in 1986 and is part of County Road 889.

== See also ==
- List of bridges in Norway
- List of bridges in Norway by length
- List of bridges
- List of bridges by length
