= Gunnarnes Chapel =

- Gunnarnes kapell
- Gunnarnes Chapel
- 70.999631°N 24.1306315°E
- Location: Måsøy Municipality, Finnmark
- Country: Norway
- Denomination: Church of Norway
- Churchmanship: Evangelical Lutheran

History
- Status: Chapel
- Founded: 1986
- Consecrated: 1986

Architecture
- Functional status: Active
- Completed: 1986 (40 years ago)

Specifications
- Capacity: 77
- Materials: Wood

Administration
- Diocese: Nord-Hålogaland
- Deanery: Hammerfest prosti
- Parish: Måsøy

Gunnarnes Chapel (Norwegian: Gunnarnes kapell) is a chapel of the Church of Norway in Måsøy Municipality in Finnmark county, Norway. It is located in the village of Gunnarnes on the island of Rolvsøya. It is an annex chapel for the Måsøy parish which is part of the Hammerfest prosti (deanery) in the Diocese of Nord-Hålogaland. The white, wooden church was built in 1986. The church seats about 77 people.

== See also ==
- List of churches in Nord-Hålogaland
