= Markus Svendsen =

Norwegian skier (born 1941)

Personal information
- Nationality: Norwegian
- Born: 28 February 1941 (age 84); Havøysund, Norway

Sport
- Sport: Nordic combined skiing
- Club: IL i BUL

Markus Svendsen (born 28 February 1941 in Havøysund) is a Norwegian skier. He was born in Havøysund and represented the club IL i BUL, Oslo. He competed in Nordic combined at the 1968 Winter Olympics in Grenoble, where he placed 27th.
