= Havøysund =

Havøysund: Havøysund (Norwegian); Ávanuorri (Northern Sami)
- Village
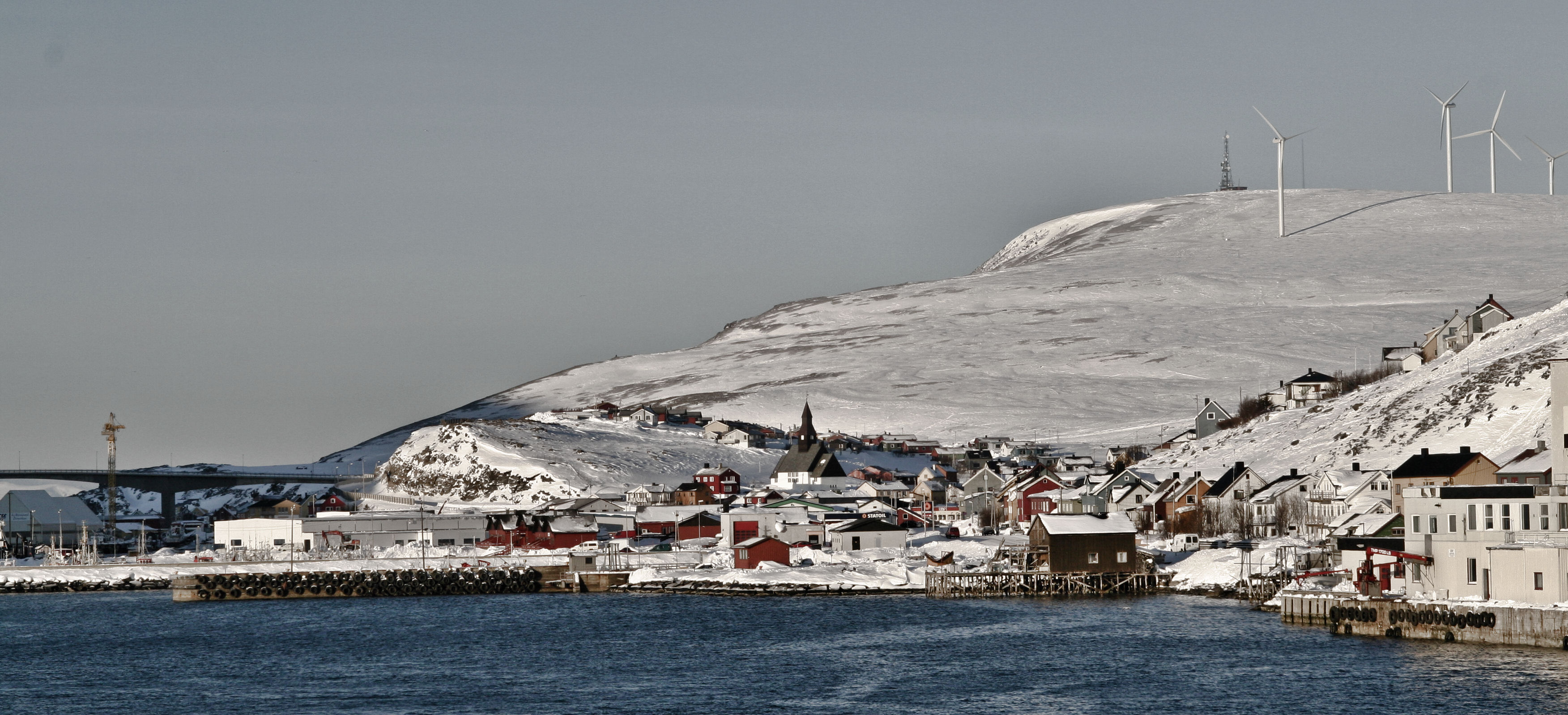
- View of the village
- Interactive map of Havøysund
- Location within Finnmark Location within Norway
- Coordinates: 70°59′46″N 24°39′43″E
- Country: Norway
- Region: Northern Norway
- County: Finnmark
- District: Vest-Finnmark
- Municipality: Måsøy Municipality

Area
  - Total: 0.63 km^{2} (0.24 sq mi)
- Elevation: 3 m (9.8 ft)

Population (2023)
  - Total: 915
  - Density: 1,452/km^{2} (3,760/sq mi)
- Time zone: UTC+01:00 (CET)
  - Summer (DST): UTC+02:00 (CEST)
- Post Code: 9690 Havøysund

Havøysund (Norwegian) or Ávanuorri (Northern Sami) is the administrative centre of the Måsøy Municipality in Finnmark county, Norway. The village is located on the small island of Havøya, but is connected to the mainland by the Havøysund Bridge. The 0.63-square-kilometre (160-acre) village has a population (2023) of 915 which gives the village a population density of 1,452 inhabitants per square kilometre (3,760/sq mi).

Havøysund is a fishing village with fish processing factories, a boat yard, a petrol station, medical services, Havøysund Church, shops, a sports hall, and museums.

== Culture ==
The settlement includes post-war houses known as gjenreisingshus (standardized dwellings built after World War II) along the beach, as well as additional houses constructed in the valley in the decades following the war.

Måsøy Museum is located in Havøysund. The museum was established in a building originally built as a rectory. The collection of items consists of tools and technical equipment used by fishermen through the 1900s. Additionally, several fixed exhibitions such as a kitchen, living room, schoolhouse, and line baiting booth.

== Economy ==
The local fish buying company has stopped buying fish for the forseeable future (as of 22 November 2026).

The local supermarket is part of the Coop Prix chain, a subsidiary of the Coop company (similar to the Tesco Extra of Tesco in the United Kingdom).

== Transportation ==
Havøysund Bridge is part of Norwegian County Road 889 which connects Havøysund to the mainland. The bridge was opened in 1986 by the late King Olav. This road is a national tourist route. The closest airport to Havøysund is Lakselv Banak Airport which is situated about 104 kilometres (65 mi) southeast in Lakselv. That airport has flights to Tromsø with connecting flights to Oslo. And direct flights to Oslo two times a week. Havøysund is also a stop on the Hurtigruten coastal express, between the towns of Hammerfest and Honningsvåg.

== Media gallery ==
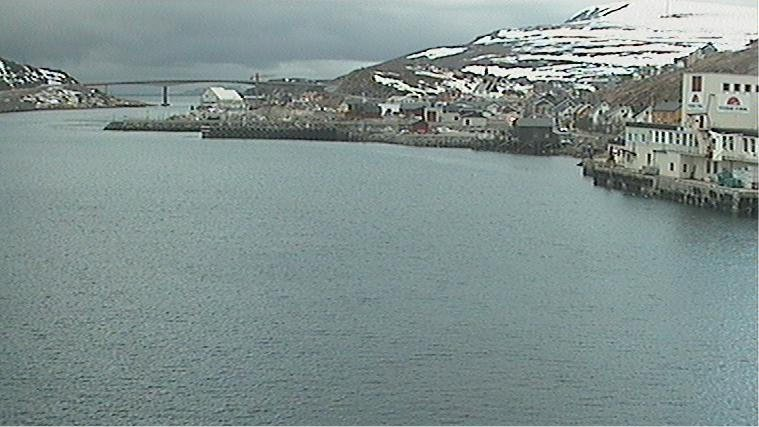

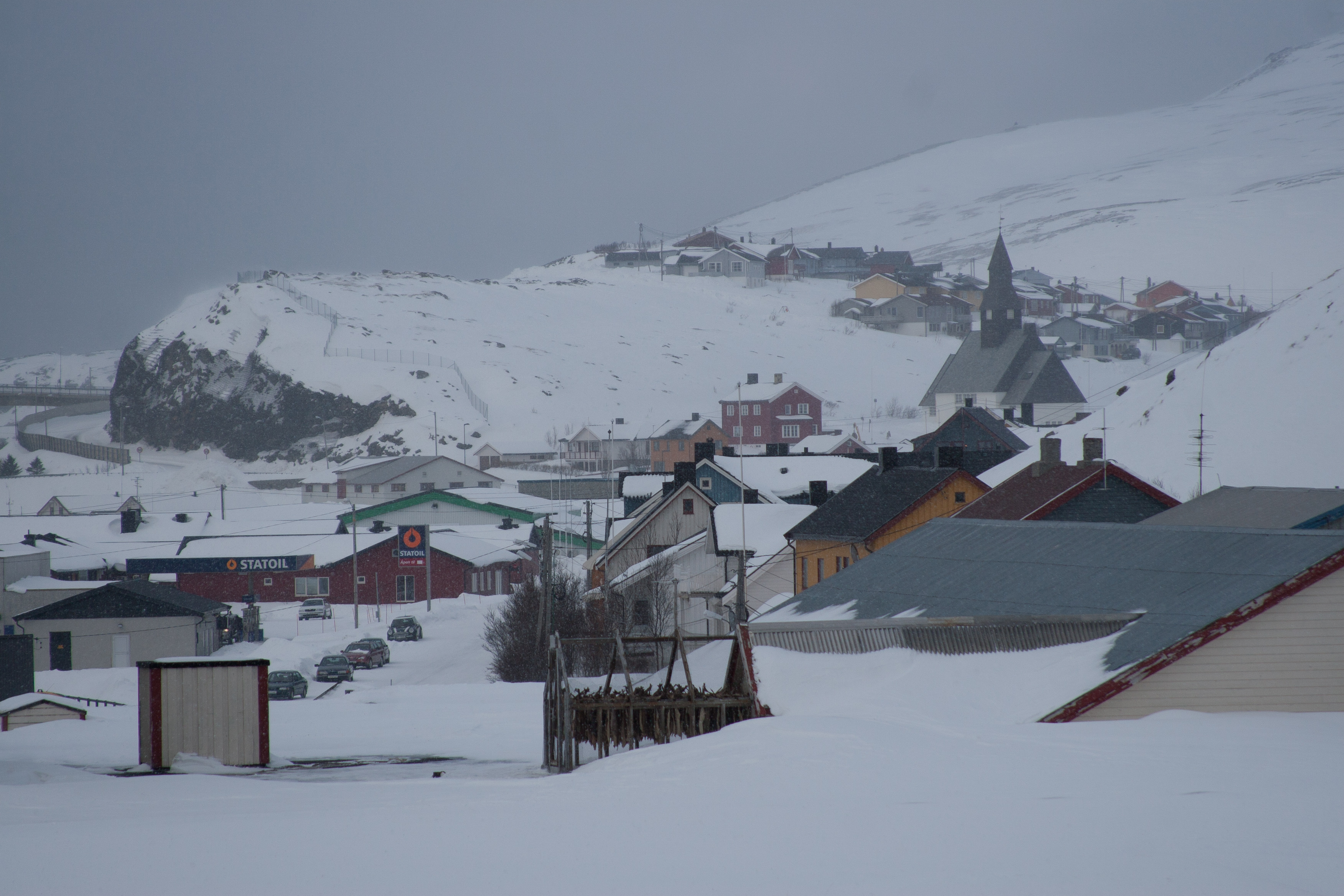

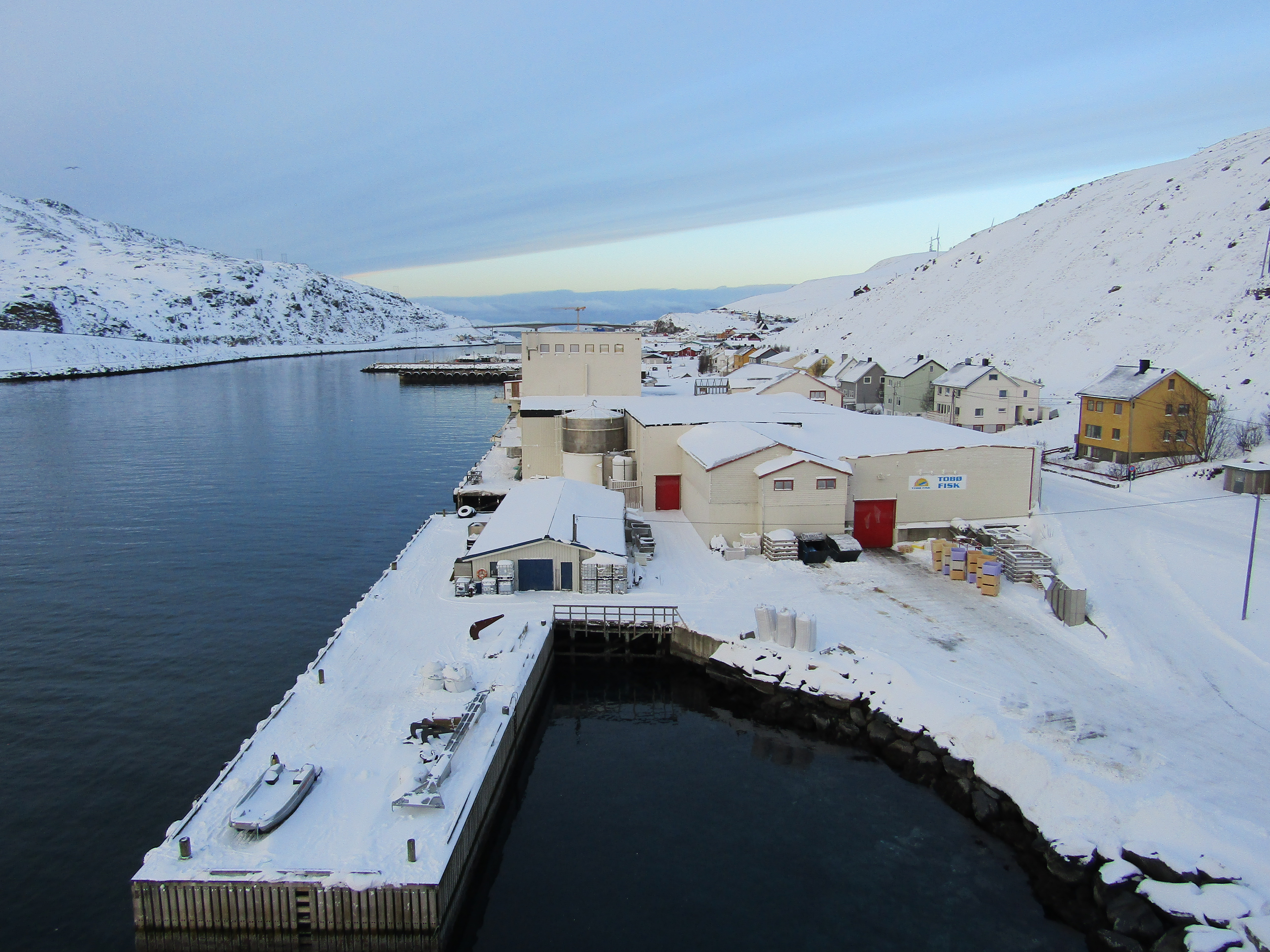

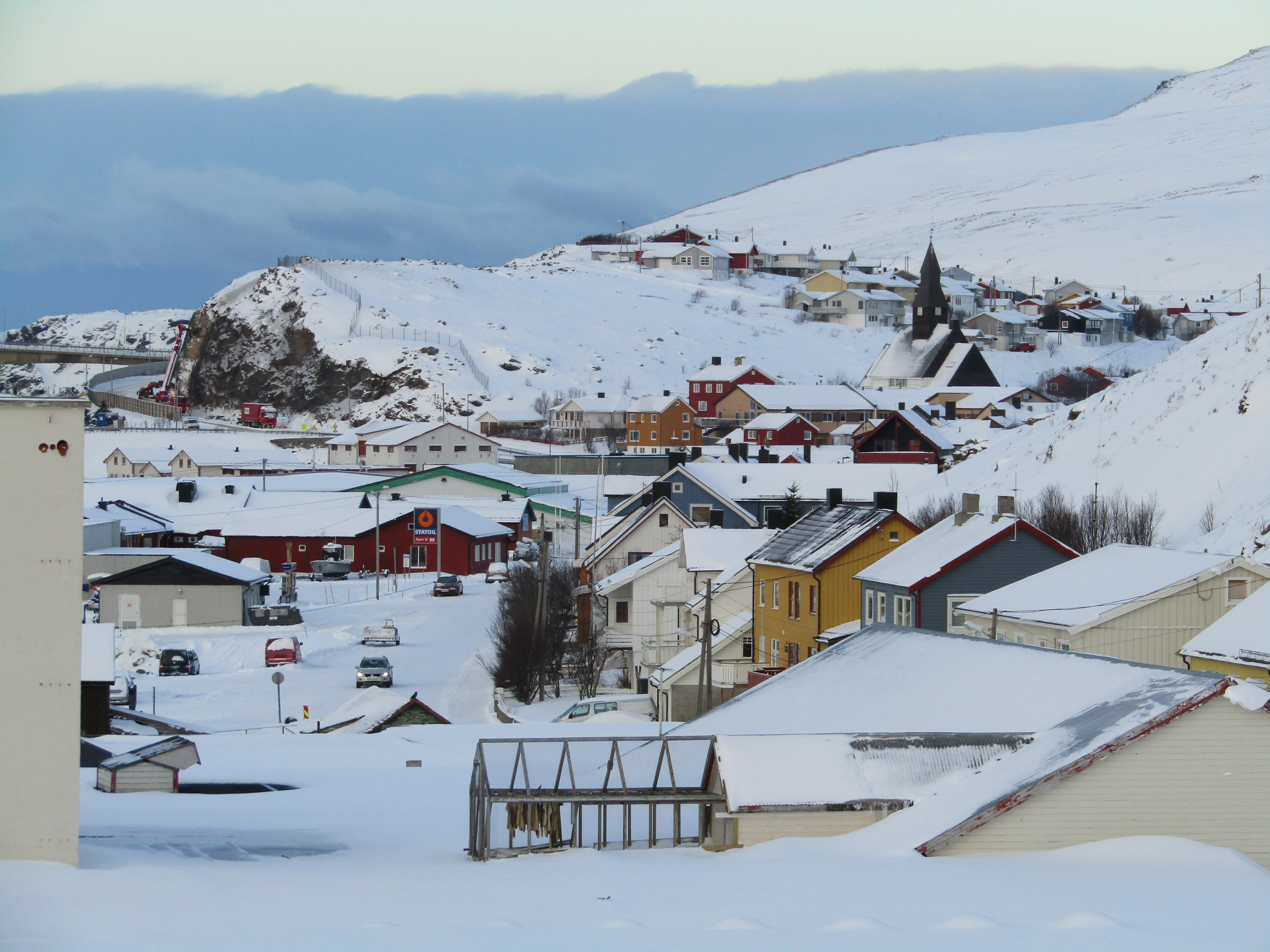

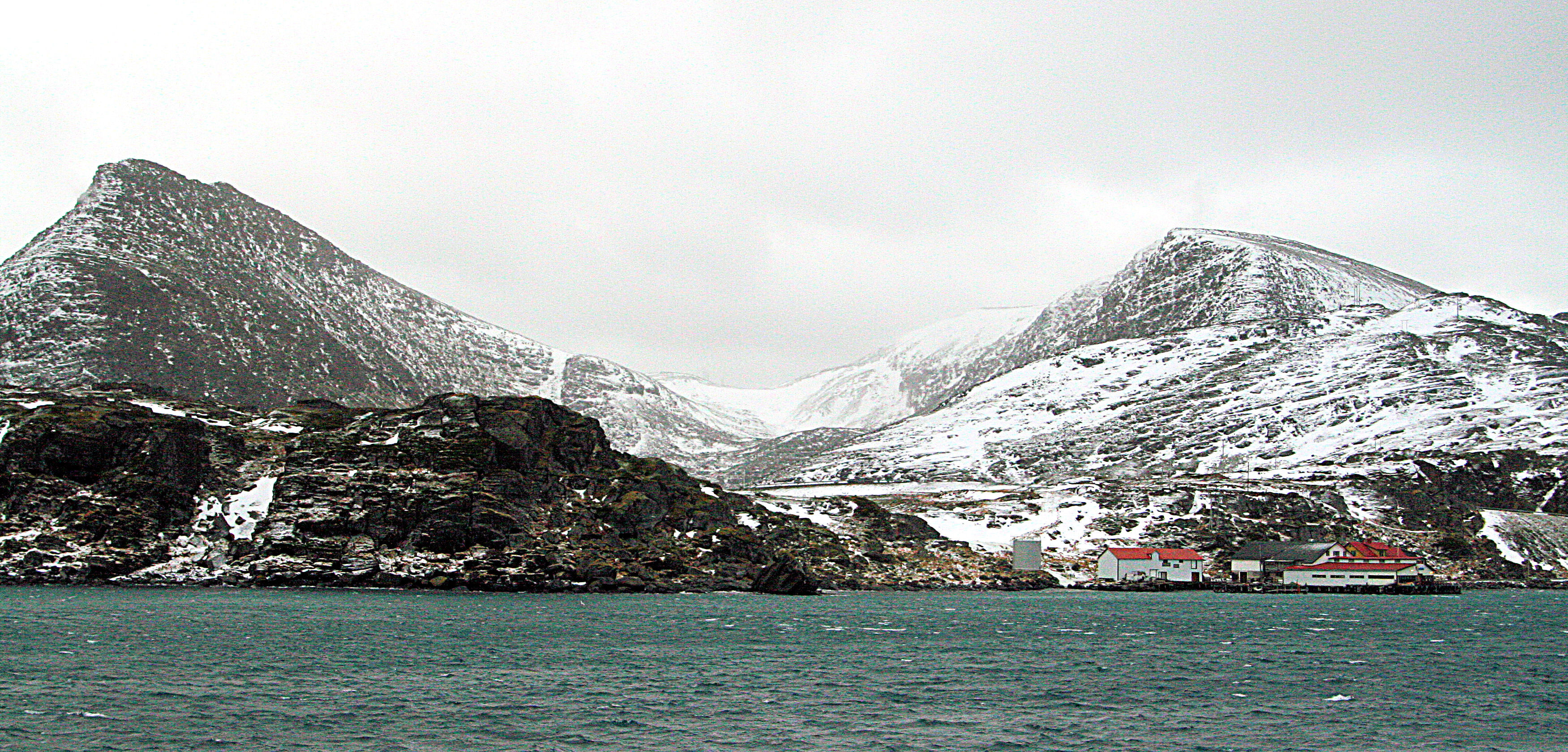

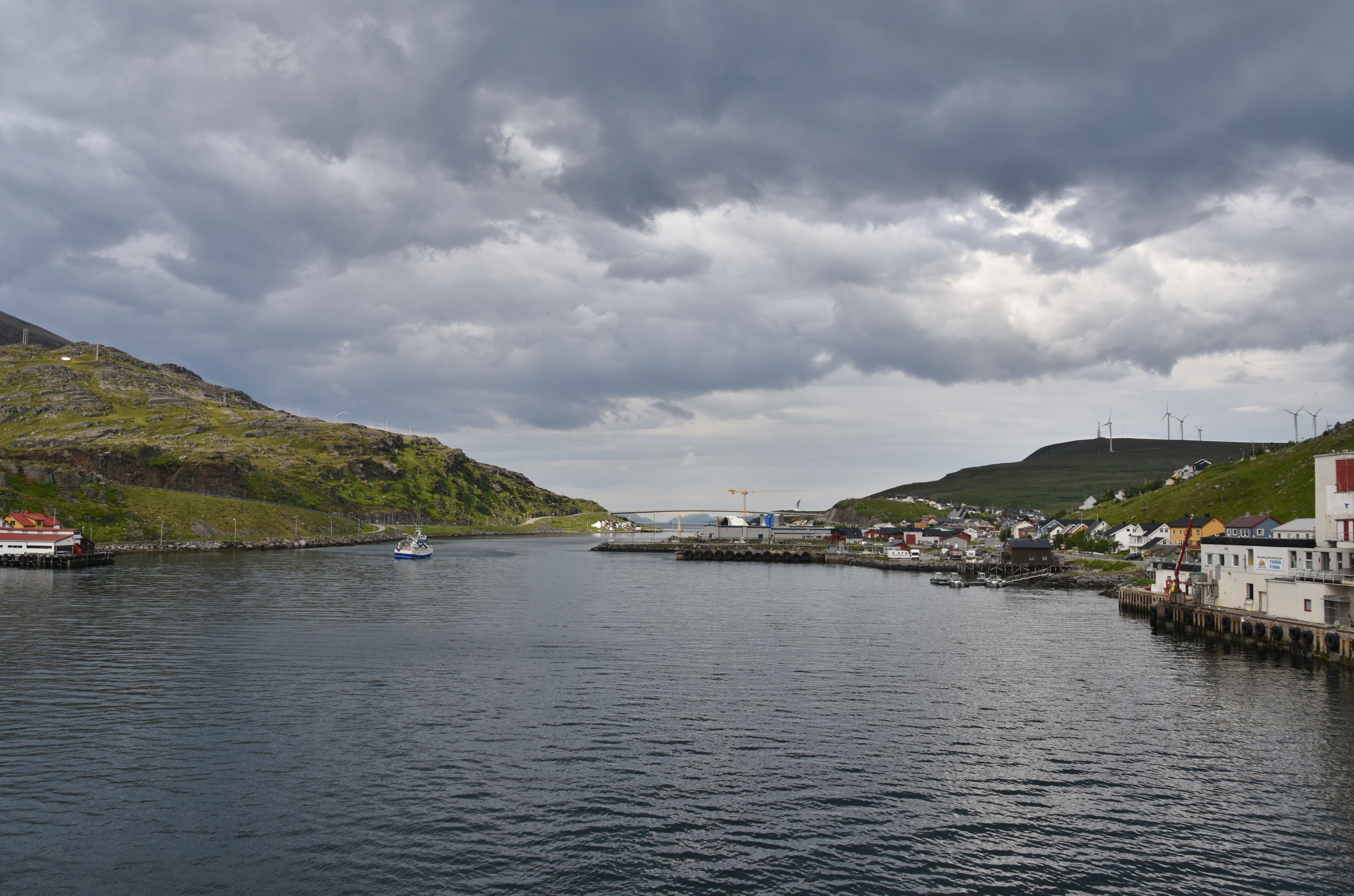

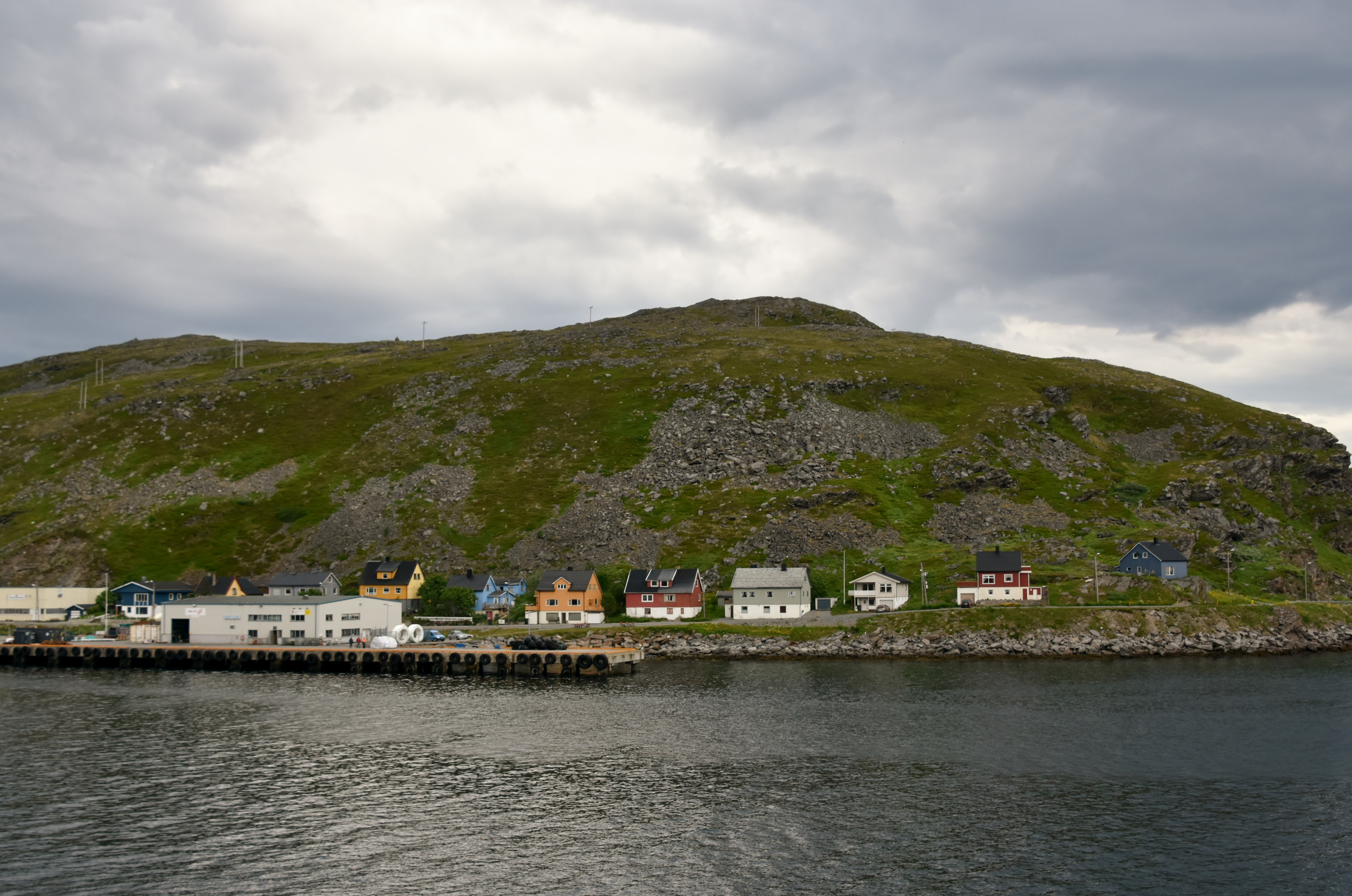

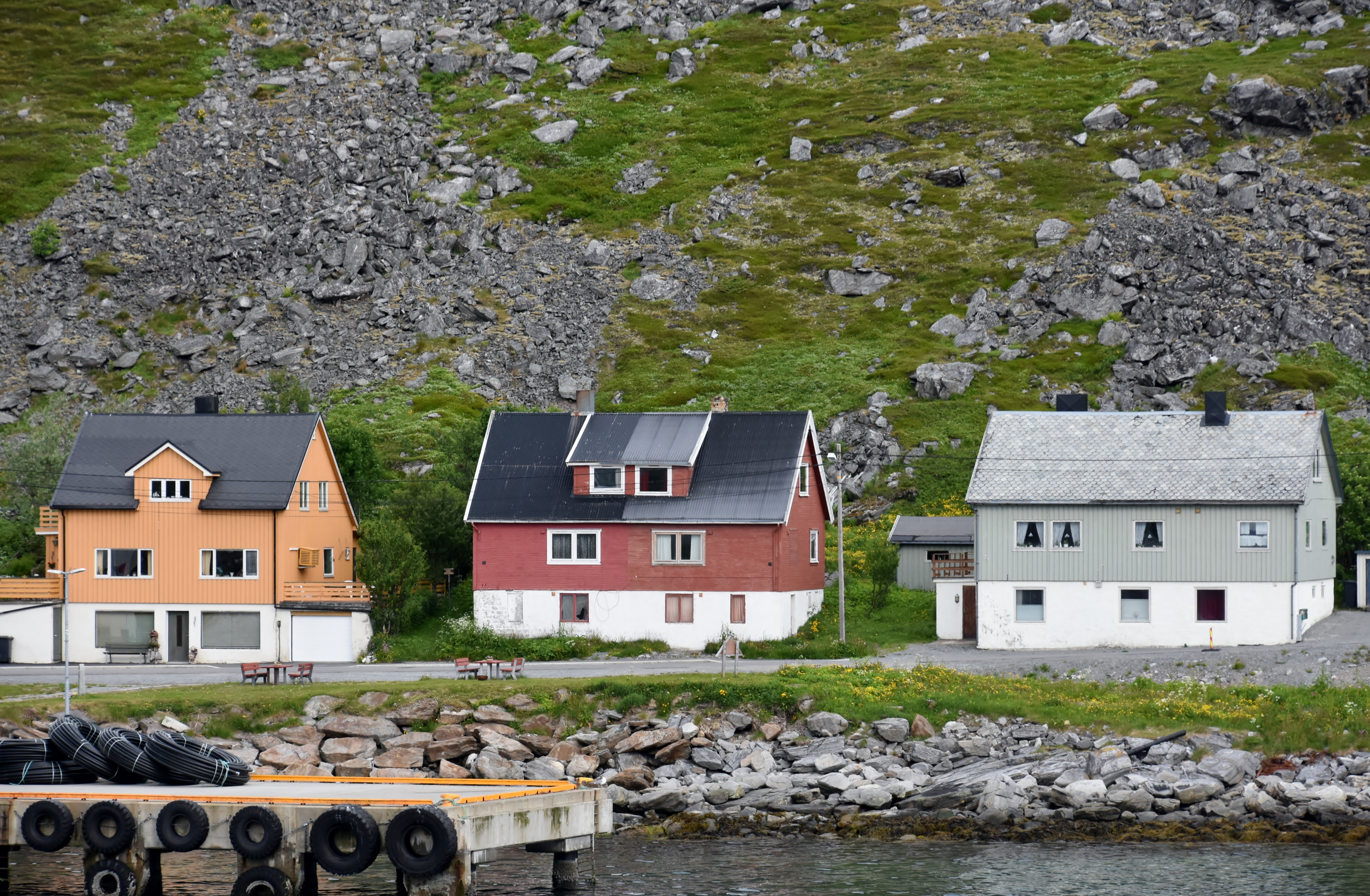

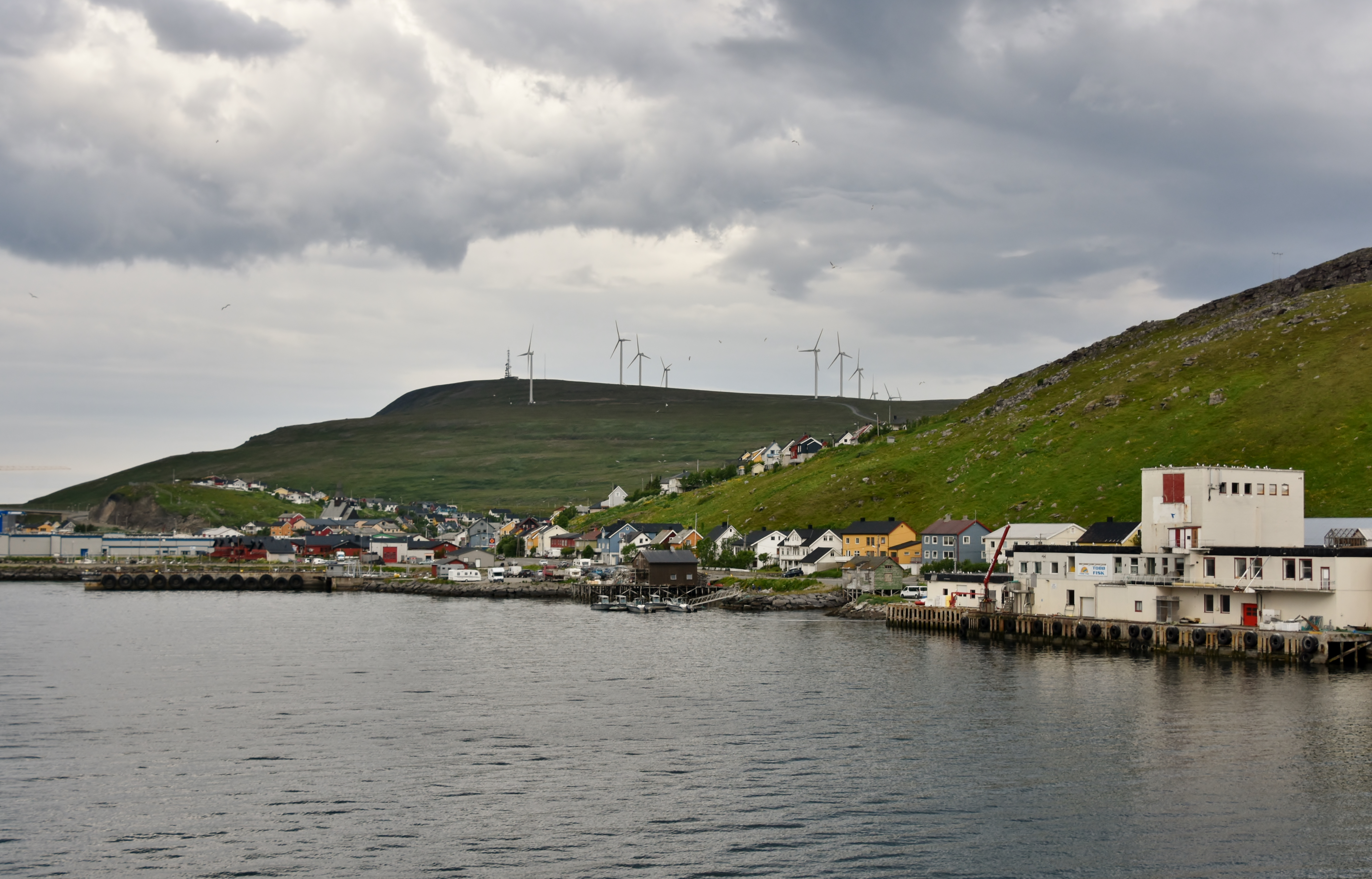

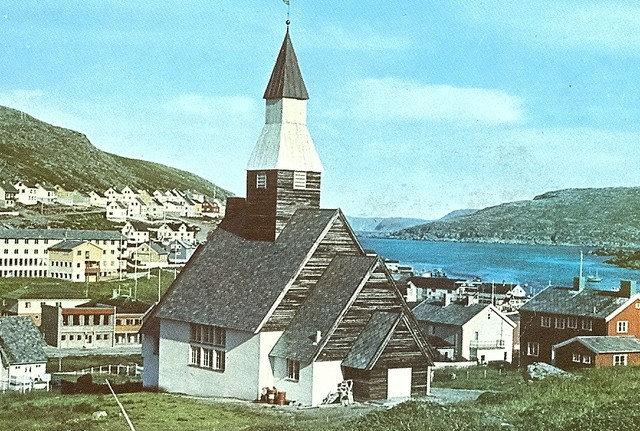

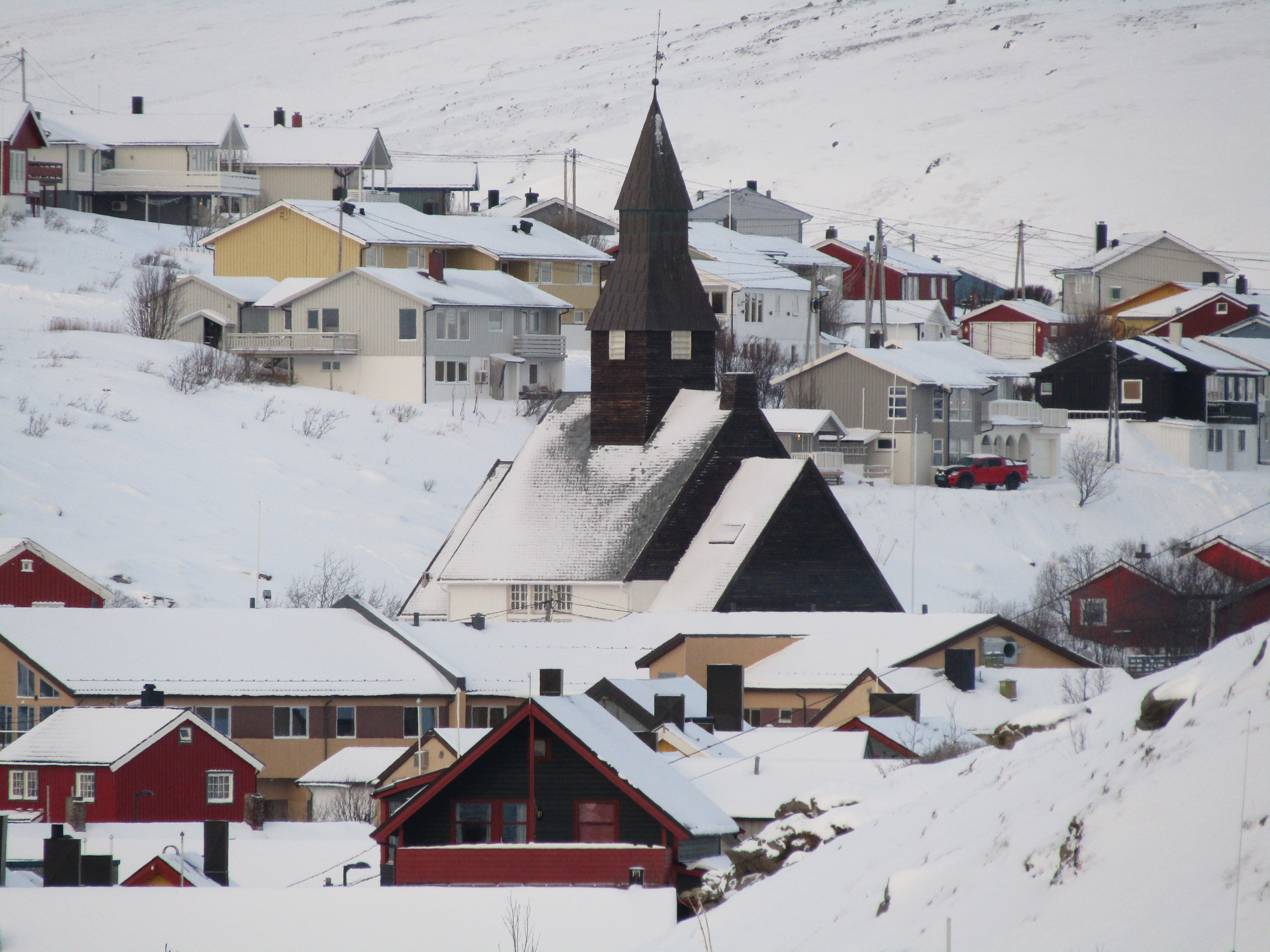
