= Talvik Municipality =

Former municipality in Finnmark, Norway

Talvik Municipality Talvik herred
- Former municipality
- Talvig herred (historic name)
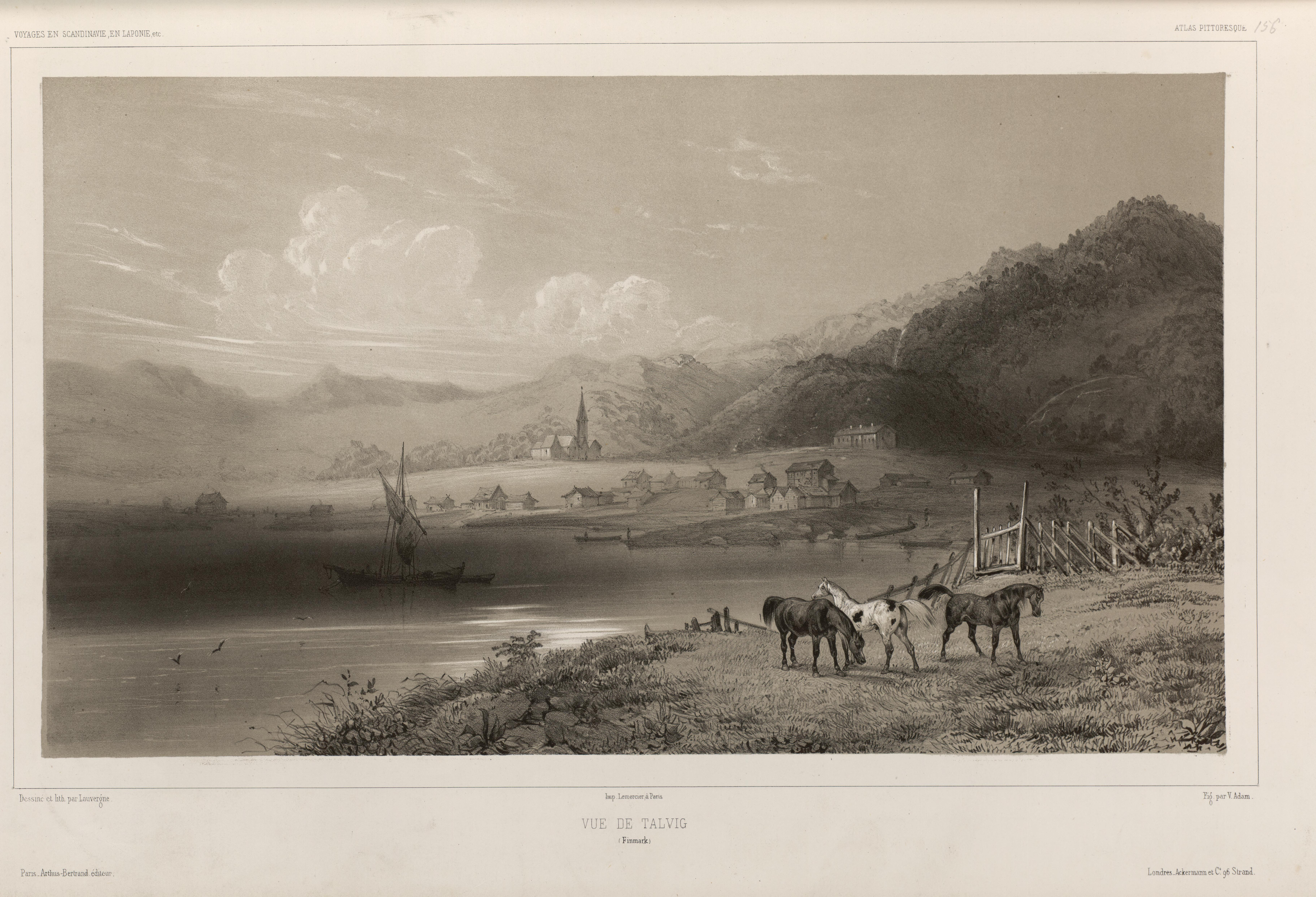
- View of the village (c. 1852)

- Finnmark within Norway

- Talvik within Finnmark
- Coordinates: 70°02′32″N 22°56′59″E
- Country: Norway
- County: Finnmark
- District: Vest-Finnmark
- Established: 1863
  - Preceded by: Alten-Talvig Municipality
- Disestablished: 1 Jan 1964
  - Succeeded by: Alta Municipality
- Administrative centre: Talvik

Government
  - Mayor (1959-1963): Thorleif Johansen (Ap)

Area (upon dissolution)
  - Total: 1,650 km^{2} (640 sq mi)
  - Rank: #36 in Norway
- Highest elevation: 1,149 m (3,770 ft)

Population (1963)
  - Total: 3,378
  - Rank: #268 in Norway
  - Density: 2/km^{2} (5.2/sq mi)
- Demonym(s): Talvikværing; Taviking

Official language
  - Norwegian form: Neutral
- Time zone: UTC+01:00 (CET)
  - Summer (DST): UTC+02:00 (CEST)
- ISO 3166 code: NO-2013

Talvik or Talvig is a former municipality in Finnmark county, Norway. The 1,650-square-kilometre (640 sq mi) municipality existed for 101 years, from 1863 until its dissolution in 1964. The municipality included all the coastal areas in the outer Altafjorden in the northern part of what is now Alta Municipality. The administrative centre was the village of Talvik where the Talvik Church is located. Other notable villages in the municipality included Komagfjord, Langenes, Langfjordbotn, and Leirbotn.

Prior to its dissolution in 1964, the 1,650-square-kilometre (640 sq mi) municipality was the 36th largest by area out of the 689 municipalities in Norway. Talvik Municipality was the 268th most populous municipality in Norway with a population of about 3,378 (in 1963). The municipality's population density was 2 inhabitants per square kilometre (5.2/sq mi).

== History ==
The municipality was established in 1863, when the large Alten-Talvig Municipality was dissolved and it was divided into two separate municipalities: Talvik Municipality (population: 1,938) in the north and Alta Municipality (population: 2,442) in the south. During the 1960s, there were many municipal mergers across Norway due to the work of the Schei Committee. On 1 January 1964, the neighboring municipalities of Talvik (population: 3,266) and Alta (population: 6,629) were merged to form a new, larger Alta Municipality.

=== Name ===
The municipality is named after the old Talvik farm since the first Talvik Church was built there. The first element of the name is rather uncertain. If the first element was of Old Norse origin then it is derived from the word Þelli which means "pine" (due to the large number of pine trees in the area). The other explanation is that it is a corruption of the Northern Sami word Dálbme or the longer name Dálbmeluokta which translates as "fog" or "fog bay". The early Norwegian settlers would have translated that as tåkebukta (meaning "fog bay") and this could have been corrupted from tåke to tal. The last element of the name is vík which means "inlet" or "cove". Historically, the name was spelled Talvig using the old Danish spelling, and later it was "Norwegianized" to Talvik.

=== Churches ===
The Church of Norway had one parish (sokn) within Talvik Municipality. It was part of the Talvik prestegjeld and the Alta prosti (deanery) in the Diocese of Nord-Hålogaland.

Churches in Talvik Municipality
Parish (sokn)	Church name	Location of the church	Year built
Talvik	Talvik Church	Talvik	1883
Talvik	Komagfjord Chapel	Komagfjord	1960
Talvik	Langfjord Chapel	Langfjordbotn	1891
Talvik	Leirbotn Chapel	Leirbotn	1935*
Note: Leirbotn Chapel burned down in 1990 and it was rebuilt in 1993.

== Geography ==
The municipality was located along the outer Altafjorden. The municipality also included the southern parts of the islands of Seiland and Stjernøya. The highest point was the 1,149-metre (3,770 ft) tall mountain Store Haldi, located on the border with Alta Municipality to the south.

== Government ==
While it existed, Talvik Municipality was responsible for primary education (through 10th grade), outpatient health services, senior citizen services, welfare and other social services, zoning, economic development, and municipal roads and utilities. The municipality was governed by a municipal council of directly elected representatives. The mayor was indirectly elected by a vote of the municipal council. The municipality was under the jurisdiction of the Hålogaland Court of Appeal.

=== Municipal council ===
The municipal council (Herredsstyre) of Talvik Municipality was made up of 21 representatives that were elected to four year terms. The tables below show the historical composition of the council by political party.

Talvik herredsstyre 1959–1963
Party name (in Norwegian)	Number of representatives
Labour Party (Arbeiderpartiet)	11
Conservative Party (Høyre)	2
Communist Party (Kommunistiske Parti)	1
Christian Democratic Party (Kristelig Folkeparti)	2
Liberal Party (Venstre)	1
List of workers, fishermen, and small farmholders (Arbeidere, fiskere, småbrukere liste)	4
Total number of members:	21
Note: On 1 January 1964, Talvik Municipality became part of Alta Municipality.

Talvik herredsstyre 1955–1959
Party name (in Norwegian)	Number of representatives
Labour Party (Arbeiderpartiet)	12
Conservative Party (Høyre)	2
Communist Party (Kommunistiske Parti)	2
Local List(s) (Lokale lister)	5
Total number of members:	21

Talvik herredsstyre 1951–1955
Party name (in Norwegian)	Number of representatives
Labour Party (Arbeiderpartiet)	11
Communist Party (Kommunistiske Parti)	1
Local List(s) (Lokale lister)	4
Total number of members:	16

Talvik herredsstyre 1947–1951
Party name (in Norwegian)	Number of representatives
Labour Party (Arbeiderpartiet)	14
Christian Democratic Party (Kristelig Folkeparti)	2
Total number of members:	16

Talvik herredsstyre 1945–1947
Party name (in Norwegian)	Number of representatives
Labour Party (Arbeiderpartiet)	10
List of workers, fishermen, and small farmholders (Arbeidere, fiskere, småbrukere liste)	6
Total number of members:	16

Talvik herredsstyre 1937–1941*
Party name (in Norwegian)	Number of representatives
Labour Party (Arbeiderpartiet)	5
List of workers, fishermen, and small farmholders (Arbeidere, fiskere, småbrukere liste)	7
Local List(s) (Lokale lister)	4
Total number of members:	16
Note: Due to the German occupation of Norway during World War II, no elections were held for new municipal councils until after the war ended in 1945.

=== Mayors ===
The mayor (Norwegian: ordfører) of Talvik Municipality was the political leader of the municipality and the chairperson of the municipal council. The following people have held this position:

- 1863–1865: Gerhard William Stuhr
- 1865–1867: Peder Andreas Olsen
- 1867–1871: Knud Toenberg
- 1871–1875: Ludvig Kristoffer Olavius Strømme
- 1875–1891: Peder Eilertson
- 1891–1893: Alexander Kristian William Hald
- 1893–1897: Anders Halvorsen
- 1897–1900: Andreas Nikolai Hammerø
- 1901–1905: Ove Edvard Olsen
- 1905–1907: Johan Petter Bjørgan
- 1908–1916: Jens Sevald Jensen
- 1917–1920: Ludvig Thomassen
- 1920–1923: Jens Sevald Jensen
- 1924–1926: Ludvig Thomassen
- 1926–1937: Kristoffer Kristoffersen
- 1938–1942: Hagbart Pedersen
- 1942–1945: Peder Frostmo (NS)
- 1945–1945: Hagbart Pedersen
- 1945–1951: Cornelius Karlstrøm (Ap)
- 1951–1959: Lauritz Mortensen
- 1959–1963: Thorleif Johansen (Ap)

== See also ==
- List of former municipalities of Norway
