= List of churches in Nord-Hålogaland =

Map of the church deaneries in the Diocese of Nord-Hålogaland

This list of churches in Nord-Hålogaland is a list of the Church of Norway churches in the Diocese of Nord-Hålogaland in Norway. It includes all of the parishes in Finnmark and Troms counties. The diocese is based at the Tromsø Cathedral in the city of Tromsø in Tromsø Municipality.

The list is divided into several sections, one for each deanery (prosti; headed by a provost) in the diocese. Administratively within each deanery, the churches within each municipality elects their own church council (fellesråd). Each municipality may have one or more parishes (sokn) within the municipality. Each parish elects their own councils (soknerådet). Each parish has one or more local church. The number and size of the deaneries and parishes has changed over time.

== Tromsø domprosti ==
This arch-deanery (Norwegian: domprosti) is home to the Tromsø Cathedral, the seat of the Bishop of the Diocese of Nord-Hålogaland. Tromsø domprosti covers Tromsø Municipality and Karlsøy Municipality in Troms county. The deanery is headquartered at Tromsø Cathedral in the city of Tromsø. Administratively, the territory of Svalbard is also part of the Tromsø domprosti, although it is not part of the county.

In 1844, the new Diocese of Hålogaland was established, with its seat at Tromsø Cathedral. After this, the parish of Tromsø was removed from Tromsø prosti and moved into the new Tromsø stiftsprosti (arch-deanery / later renamed Tromsø domprosti) since it was the seat of the Diocese. On 18 October 1856 the new parish of Balsfjord was established, and then on 10 November 1860, the new parish of Tromsøysund was established and both of these areas were removed from the Tromsø stiftsprosti (arch-deanery) and moved to the Tromsø prosti (deanery). In 1963, the parish of Tromsøysund was transferred from Troms prosti (back) to Tromsø domprosti. In the late 1970s, the parish of Karlsøy was also moved from Troms prosti to Tromsø domprosti.

Municipality	Parish (sokn)	Church	Location	Year built	Photo
Karlsøy	Karlsøy	Helgøy Church	Helgøya	1742	
Karlsøy	Karlsøy	Karlsøy Church	Karlsøya	1854	
Karlsøy	Karlsøy	Ringvassøy Church	Hansnes	1977	
Karlsøy	Karlsøy	Sengskroken Church	Vanna	1962	
Tromsø	Tromsø; Domkirken	Tromsø Cathedral	Tromsø	1861	
Tromsø	Elverhøy	Elverhøy Church	Tromsø	1803	
Tromsø	Grønnåsen	Grønnåsen Church	Tromsø	1996	
Tromsø	Hillesøy	Hillesøy Church	Brensholmen, Kvaløya	1889	
Tromsø	Kroken	Kroken Church	Kroken	2006	
Tromsø	Kvaløy	Kvaløy Church	Kaldfjord	1962	
Tromsø	Tromsøysund	Arctic Cathedral	Tromsdalen	1965	
Tromsø	Ullsfjord	Lakselvbukt Church	Lakselvbukt	1983	
Tromsø	Ullsfjord	Ullsfjord Church	Sjursnes	1862	
Tromsø	Ullsfjord	Jøvik Chapel	Jøvika	1920	
Svalbard*	Svalbard	Svalbard Church	Longyearbyen	1958	
*Note: Svalbard is not in Troms or Finnmark county, but it is part of the Tromsø domprosti.

== Alta prosti ==
This deanery (Norwegian: prosti) covers the western part of Finnmark county. It includes Alta Municipality, Hasvik Municipality, and Loppa Municipality. The deanery is headquartered at the Northern Lights Cathedral in the town of Alta in Alta Municipality.

The deanery was established on 14 May 1864 when the old Vest-Finnmark prosti was split into Alta prosti and Hammerfest prosti. The new deanery originally included all of the parishes located in Alta Municipality, Talvik Municipality, Loppa Municipality, and Kautokeino Municipality. On 1 April 1991, Kautokeino Municipality was moved to the newly created Indre Finnmark prosti.

Municipality	Parish (sokn)	Church	Location	Year built	Photo
Alta	Alta	Alta Church	Alta	1858	
Alta	Alta	Elvebakken Church	Alta	1964	
Alta	Alta	Kåfjord Church	Kåfjord	1837	
Alta	Alta	Northern Lights Cathedral	Alta	2013	
Alta	Alta	Rafsbotn Chapel	Rafsbotn	1989	
Alta	Talvik	Komagfjord Church	Komagfjord	1960	
Alta	Talvik	Langfjord Church	Langfjordbotn	1891	
Alta	Talvik	Leirbotn Church	Leirbotn	1993	
Alta	Talvik	Talvik Church	Talvik	1883	
Hasvik	Hasvik	Breivikbotn Chapel	Breivikbotn	1959	
Hasvik	Hasvik	Dønnesfjord Church	Dønnesfjord	1888	
Hasvik	Hasvik	Hasvik Church	Hasvik	1955	
Hasvik	Hasvik	Sørvær Chapel	Sørvær	1968	
Loppa	Loppa	Bergsfjord Church	Bergsfjord	1951	
Loppa	Loppa	Loppa Church	Loppa	1953	
Loppa	Loppa	Nuvsvåg Chapel	Nuvsvåg	1961	
Loppa	Loppa	Sandland Chapel	Sandland	1971	
Loppa	Loppa	Øksfjord Church	Øksfjord	1954	

== Hammerfest prosti ==
This deanery (Norwegian: prosti) covers the northern part of Finnmark county. The deanery covers the five municipalities of Gamvik, Hammerfest, Lebesby, Måsøy, and Nordkapp. The deanery is headquartered at the Hammerfest Church in the town of Hammerfest in Hammerfest Municipality.

The deanery was established on 14 May 1864 when the old Vest-Finnmark prosti and Øst-Finnmark prosti were split into Alta prosti, Hammerfest prosti, and Varanger prosti. The new Hammerfest prosti took the Lebesby parish from the Øst-Finnmark prosti and the large parishes of Hammerfest, Maasø, and Kistrand came from Vest-Finnmark prosti. On 1 April 1991, the parishes in Karasjok Municipality and Porsanger Municipality were moved to the newly created Indre Finnmark prosti.

Municipality	Parish (sokn)	Church	Location	Year built	Photo
Gamvik	Gamvik	Gamvik Church	Gamvik	1958	
Gamvik	Gamvik	Hop Church	Skjånes	1977	
Gamvik	Gamvik	Mehamn Chapel	Mehamn	1965	
Hammerfest	Hammerfest	Hammerfest Church	Hammerfest	1961	
Hammerfest	Kvalsund	Kvalsund Church	Kvalsund	1936	
Hammerfest	Kvalsund	Sennalandet Chapel	Áisaroaivi	1961	
Hammerfest	Kokelv	Kokelv Church	Kokelv	1960	
Lebesby	Lebesby	Kjøllefjord Church	Kjøllefjord	1951	
Lebesby	Lebesby	Kunes Chapel	Kunes		
Lebesby	Lebesby	Lebesby Church	Lebesby	1962	
Lebesby	Lebesby	Veidnes Chapel	Veidnes	1981	
Måsøy	Måsøy	Gunnarnes Chapel	Rolvsøya	1986	
Måsøy	Måsøy	Havøysund Church	Havøysund	1961	
Måsøy	Måsøy	Ingøy Church	Ingøy	1957	
Måsøy	Måsøy	Måsøy Church	Måsøya	1953	
Måsøy	Måsøy	Slotten Chapel	Slåtten	1965	
Nordkapp	Nordkapp	Gjesvær Chapel	Gjesvær	1960	
Nordkapp	Nordkapp	Honningsvåg Church	Honningsvåg	1885	
Nordkapp	Nordkapp	Repvåg Church	Repvåg	1967	
Nordkapp	Nordkapp	Skarsvåg Church	Skarsvåg	1961	

== Indre Finnmark prosti ==
This deanery (Norwegian: prosti / also called Sis-Finnmárkku proavássuohkan in the Northern Sami language) covers the five municipalities of Kautokeino, Karasjok, Porsanger, Nesseby, and Tana in the southern part of Finnmark county. The deanery is headquartered at the Karasjok Church in the village of Karasjok in Karasjok Municipality.

This deanery was established on 1 April 1991 when parts of the three existing deaneries were transferred to this new Sami-majority deanery: Kautokeino (from Alta prosti), Porsanger and Karasjok (from Hammerfest prosti), and Tana and Nesseby (from Varanger prosti). At 25,520.2 square kilometres (9,853.4 sq mi), this is the largest deanery in Norway by size. This deanery is also the only deanery in Norway with a majority of members being Sami people, which is why the Northern Sami language is the administrative language for the deanery. Services are held in both Norwegian and Sami languages.

Municipality	Parish (sokn)	Church	Location	Year built	Photo
Karasjok	Karasjok	Karasjok Church	Karasjok	1974	Karasjok Church
Karasjok	Karasjok	Old Karasjok Church	Karasjok	1807	
Karasjok	Karasjok	Suosjavrre Chapel	Šuoššjávri	1968	
Karasjok	Karasjok	Valjok Church	Váljohka	1932	
Kautokeino	Kautokeino	Kautokeino Church	Kautokeino	1958	
Kautokeino	Kautokeino	Láhpoluoppal Chapel	Láhpoluoppal	1967	
Kautokeino	Kautokeino	Masi Church	Masi	1965	
Nesseby	Nesseby	Nesseby Church	Nesseby	1858	
Porsanger	Porsanger	Brenna Chapel	Brenna	1971	
Porsanger	Porsanger	Børselv Church	Børselv	1958	
Porsanger	Porsanger	Kistrand Church	Kistrand	1856	
Porsanger	Porsanger	Lakselv Church	Lakselv	1963	
Porsanger	Porsanger	Skoganvarre Chapel	Skoganvarre	1963	
Tana	Tana	Austertana Chapel	Austertana	1958	
Tana	Tana	Polmak Church	Polmak	1853	
Tana	Tana	Tana Church	Rustefjelbma	1964	

== Nord-Troms prosti ==
This deanery (Norwegian: prosti) covers six municipalities in the northern part of Troms county: Gáivuotna–Kåfjord, Kvænangen, Lyngen, Nordreisa, Skjervøy, and Storfjord. The deanery is headquartered at the Nordreisa Church in the village of Storslett in Nordreisa Municipality.

The old Tromsø prosti was established after the Reformation in Norway in 1589, and at that time, it was part of the Diocese of Nidaros. The deanery originally encompassed the northern part of Troms county. It was considered to be one parish with 8 churches and a total of 4 priests for the whole deanery. Around 1750, the deanery was divided with the creation of the new Senjen prosti in the central part of the county. In 1776, the deanery was divided into four parishes: Tromsø, Karlsøy, Lyngen, and Skjervøy. In 1844, the new Diocese of Hålogaland was established, with its seat at Tromsø Cathedral. After this, the parish of Tromsø was removed from Tromsø prosti and moved into the new Tromsø stiftsprosti (arch-deanery) since it was the seat of the Diocese. This left Karlsøy, Lyngen, and Skjervøy in Tromsø prosti. On 18 October 1856 the new parish of Balsfjord was established, and then on 10 November 1860, the new parish of Tromsøysund was established and both of these areas were removed from the Tromsø stiftsprosti (arch-deanery) and moved to the Tromsø prosti (deanery). A royal resolution on 19 May 1922 changed the deanery name from "Tromsø prosti" to "Troms prosti". In 1963, the Tromsøysund parish was transferred from Troms prosti (back) to Tromsø domprosti. In the late 1970s, the parish of Karlsøy was also moved from Troms prosti to Tromsø domprosti. In 1998, the new Indre Troms prosti was established and the churches in Balsfjord Municipality were transferred from Troms prosti to the new deanery. At the same time, the name of this deanery was changed from Troms prosti to Nord-Troms prosti.

Municipality	Parish (sokn)	Church	Location	Year built	Photo
Gáivuotna–Kåfjord	Kåfjord	Kåfjord Church	Olderdalen	1949	
Kvænangen	Kvænangen	Burfjord Church	Burfjord	2009	
Kvænangen	Kvænangen	Sekkemo Church	Sekkemo	1956	
Kvænangen	Kvænangen	Skorpa Church	Skorpa	1850	
Lyngen	Lyngen	Lyngen Church	Lyngseidet	1782	
Lyngen	Lyngen	Lenangsøyra Chapel	Lyngmo	1996	
Nordreisa	Nordreisa	Nordreisa Church	Storslett	1856	
Nordreisa	Nordreisa	Rotsund Chapel	Rotsund	1932	
Skjervøy	Skjervøy	Arnøy Church	Arnøyhamn	1978	
Skjervøy	Skjervøy	Skjervøy Church	Skjervøya	1728	
Storfjord	Storfjord	Storfjord Church	Hatteng	1952	
Storfjord	Storfjord	Skibotn Chapel	Skibotn	1895	

== Senja prosti ==
This deanery (Norwegian: prosti) covers eight municipalities on the island of Senja and the central part of Troms county including the municipalities of Balsfjord, Bardu, Dyrøy, Lavangen, Målselv, Salangen, Senja, and Sørreisa. The deanery is headquartered at Finnsnes Church in the town of Finnsnes in Senja Municipality.

The deanery was established around the year 1750 when the large Tromsø prosti was divided and the southern part became the new Senjens prosti. On 1 January 1860, the southern part of the deanery was split off to become the new Trondenes prosti, leaving Senjen prosti with the parishes of Berg, Tranøy, Lenvik, and Målselv. A royal resolution on 19 May 1922 changed the deanery name from "Senjen prosti" to "Senja prosti".

On 1 January 2020, the old Indre Troms prosti was merged with Senja prosti. Indre Troms was in existence from 1998 until 2019. It covered five municipalities in the southeastern part of Troms county: Balsfjord, Bardu, Lavangen, Målselv, and Salangen. The deanery was headquartered at in the village of Bardufoss in Målselv Municipality. The deanery was created in 1998 by transferring Bardu and Målselv municipalities from Senja prosti, Balsfjord from Troms prosti, and Lavangen and Salangen from Trondenes prosti. The old Troms prosti was renamed Nord-Troms prosti at the same time.

Municipality	Parish (sokn)	Church	Location	Year built	Photo
Balsfjord	Balsfjord	Balsfjord Church	Tennes	1856	
Balsfjord	Balsfjord	Nordkjosbotn Church	Nordkjosbotn	1987	
Balsfjord	Balsfjord	Storsteinnes Chapel	Storsteinnes	1968	
Balsfjord	Malangen	Malangen Church	Mortenhals	1853	
Balsfjord	Malangen	Mestervik Chapel	Mestervik	1968	
Bardu	Bardu	Bardu Church	Setermoen	1829	
Bardu	Bardu	Nedre Bardu Chapel	Brandmoen	1981	
Bardu	Bardu	Øvre Bardu Chapel	Sørdalen	1971	
Bardu	Bardu	Salangsdalen Chapel	Salangsdalen	1981	
Dyrøy	Dyrøy	Dyrøy Church	Holm	1880	
Dyrøy	Dyrøy	Brøstad Chapel	Brøstadbotn	1937	
Lavangen	Lavangen	Lavangen Church	Soløy	1891	
Målselv	Målselv	Målselv Church	Målselv (10 km north of Bardufoss)	1978	
Målselv	Øverbygd	Øverbygd Church	Øverbygd	1867	
Målselv	Øverbygd	Kirkesnesmoen Chapel	Kirkesnesmoen	1977	
Senja	Berg	Berg Church	Skaland	1955	
Senja	Berg	Finnsæter Chapel	Finnsæter	1982	
Senja	Berg	Mefjordvær Chapel	Mefjordvær	1916	
Senja	Lenvik	Finnsnes Church	Finnsnes	1979	
Senja	Lenvik	Lenvik Church	Bjorelvnes	1879	
Senja	Lenvik	Rossfjord Church	Rossfjordstraumen	1822	
Senja	Lenvik	Fjordgård Chapel	Fjordgård	1976	
Senja	Lenvik	Gibostad Chapel	Gibostad	1939	
Senja	Lenvik	Husøy Chapel	Husøy i Senja	1957	
Senja	Lenvik	Lysbotn Chapel	Lysnes	1970	
Senja	Lenvik	Sandbakken Chapel	Sandbakken	1974	
Senja	Torsken	Torsken Church	Torsken	1784	
Senja	Torsken	Flakkstadvåg Chapel	Flakstadvåg	1925	
Senja	Torsken	Gryllefjord Chapel	Gryllefjord	1902	
Senja	Torsken	Medby Chapel	Medby	1890	
Senja	Tranøy	Stonglandet Church	Stonglandseidet	1896	
Senja	Tranøy	Tranøy Church	Tranøya	1775	
Senja	Tranøy	Skrolsvik Chapel	Skrollsvika	1924	
Senja	Tranøy	Vangsvik Chapel	Vangsvik	1975	
Salangen	Salangen	Salangen Church	Sjøvegan	1981	
Salangen	Salangen	Elvenes Chapel	Elvenes	1959	
Sørreisa	Sørreisa	Sørreisa Church	Tømmervika	1992	
Sørreisa	Sørreisa	Skøelv Chapel	Skøelva	1966	
Sørreisa	Sørreisa	Straumen Chapel	Sørreisa	1973	

== Trondenes prosti ==
This deanery (Norwegian: prosti) covers five municipalities in the southwestern part of Troms county. It includes the five municipalities of Gratangen, Harstad, Ibestad, Kvæfjord, and Tjeldsund. The deanery is headquartered in the town of Harstad in Harstad Municipality.

This deanery was established on 1 January 1860 when the old Senjen prosti was divided into two deaneries: Senjen in the north and Trondenes in the south. The parishes in Lavangen Municipality and Salangen Municipality were transferred to Trondenes prosti to the new Indre Troms prosti in 1998.

Municipality	Parish (sokn)	Church	Location	Year built	Photo
Gratangen	Gratangen	Gratangen Church	Årstein	1971	
Harstad	Harstad	Harstad Church	Harstad	1958	
Harstad	Kanebogen	Kanebogen Church	Kanebogen	1999	
Harstad	Sandtorg	Gausvik Church	Gausvik	1979	
Harstad	Sandtorg	Sandtorg Church	Sørvika	1932	
Harstad	Trondenes	Trondenes Church	Trondenes	1400s	
Harstad	Trondenes	Elgsnes Chapel	Elgsnes	1985	
Harstad	Vågsfjord	Bjarkøy Church	Nergården	1766	
Harstad	Vågsfjord	Grøtavær Church	Grøtavær	1915	
Harstad	Vågsfjord	Lundenes Church	Lundenes	1974	
Harstad	Vågsfjord	Sandsøy Church	Sandsøya	1888	
Ibestad	Andørja	Andørja Church	Engenes	1914	
Ibestad	Ibestad	Ibestad Church	Hamnvik	1881	
Ibestad	Ibestad	Sørrollnes Chapel	Sørrollnes	1976	
Kvæfjord	Kvæfjord	Kvæfjord Church	Borkenes	1867	
Kvæfjord	Kvæfjord	Langvassbukt Chapel	Langvassbukta	1981	
Tjeldsund	Astafjord	Astafjord Church	Grov	1978	
Tjeldsund	Skånland	Skånland Church	Evenskjer	1901	
Tjeldsund	Tjeldsund	Tjeldsund Church	Hol i Tjeldsund	1863	
Tjeldsund	Tjeldsund	Fjelldal Chapel	Fjelldal	1960	
Tjeldsund	Tjeldsund	Ramsund Chapel	Ramsund	1964	
Tjeldsund	Tovik	Tovik Church	Tovik	1905	

== Varanger prosti ==
This deanery covers the eastern part of Finnmark in the areas surrounding the Varangerfjorden and the areas on the Varanger Peninsula. The deanery includes the five municipalities of Berlevåg Båtsfjord, Sør-Varanger, Vadsø, and Vardø. The deanery is headquartered at Vadsø Church in the town of Vadsø in Vadsø Municipality.

Varanger prosti was established on 14 May 1864 when the old Øst-Finnmark prosti was dissolved, moving Lebesby prestegjeld to the newly created Hammerfest prosti and the rest of the old deanery became Varanger prosti. Originally, the parishes in Tana Municipality and Nesseby Municipality were part of the Varanger prosti, but on 1 April 1991, both were moved to the newly created Indre Finnmark prosti.

Municipality	Parish (sokn)	Church	Location	Year built	Photo
Berlevåg	Berlevåg	Berlevåg Church	Berlevåg	1960	
Båtsfjord	Båtsfjord	Båtsfjord Church	Båtsfjord	1971	
Båtsfjord	Båtsfjord	Hamningberg Chapel	Hamningberg	1949	
Båtsfjord	Båtsfjord	Syltefjord Chapel	Nordfjord	1934	
Sør-Varanger	Sør-Varanger	Bugøynes Chapel	Bugøynes	1989	
Sør-Varanger	Sør-Varanger	Kirkenes Church	Kirkenes	1959	
Sør-Varanger	Sør-Varanger	King Oscar II Chapel	Grense Jakobselv	1869	
Sør-Varanger	Sør-Varanger	Neiden Chapel	Neiden	1902	
Sør-Varanger	Sør-Varanger	Svanvik Church	Svanvik (in the Pasvikdalen valley)	1934	
Vadsø	Vadsø	Skallelv Church	Skallelv	1961	
Vadsø	Vadsø	Vadsø Church	Vadsø	1958	
Vadsø	Vadsø	Vestre Jakobselv Church	Vestre Jakobselv	1940	
Vardø	Vardø	Vardø Church	Vardø	1958	
Vardø	Vardø	Vardø Chapel	Vardø	1908	
