= Alta-Talvik Municipality =

Former municipality in Finnmark, Norway

Alta-Talvik Municipality Alta-Talvik herred
- Former municipality
- Alten-Talvig herred (historic name)
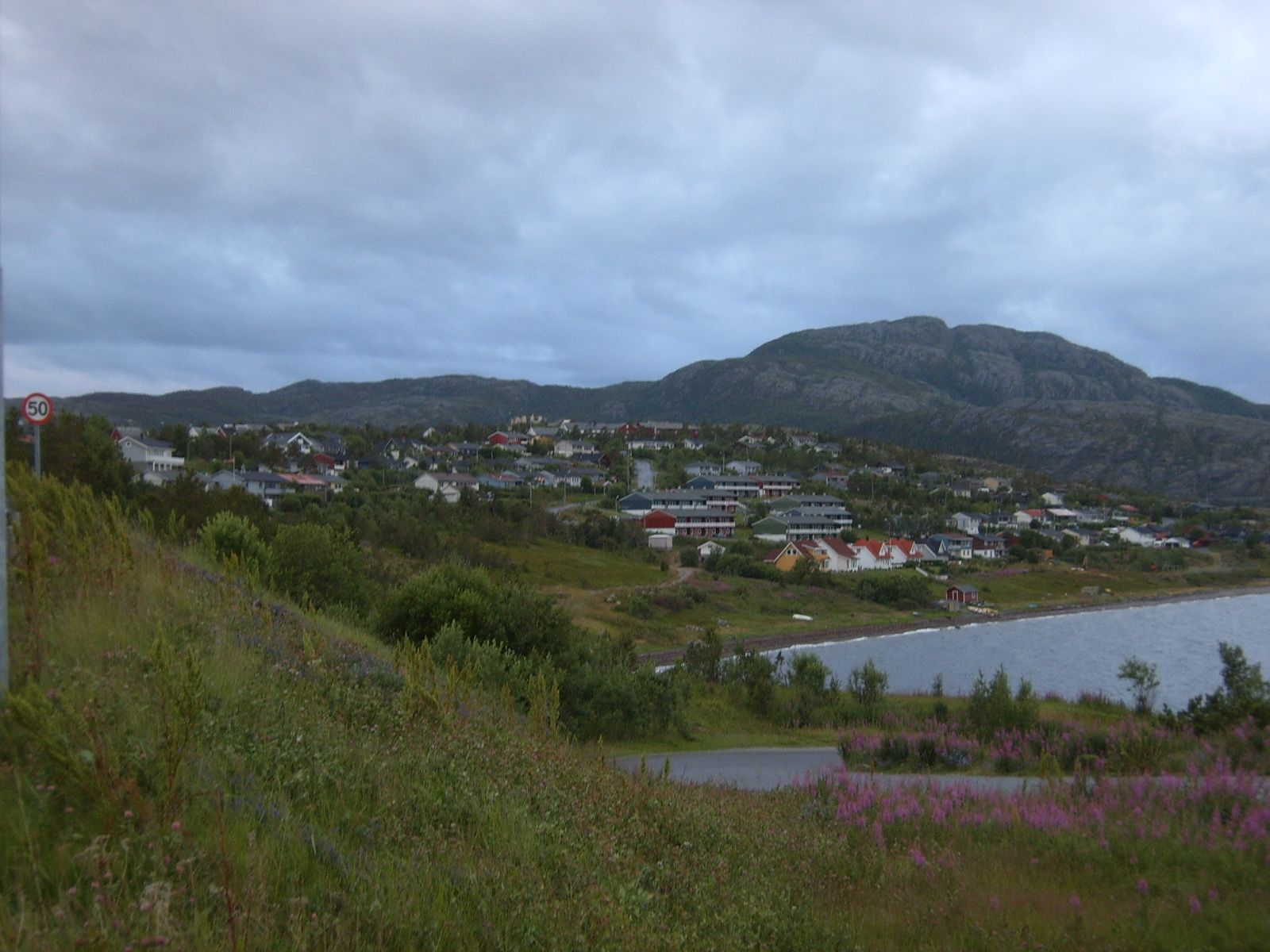

- Finnmark within Norway

- Alta-Talvik within Finnmark
- Coordinates: 69°58′07″N 23°16′17″E
- Country: Norway
- County: Finnmark
- District: Vest-Finnmark
- Established: 1 Jan 1838
  - Created as: Formannskapsdistrikt
- Disestablished: 1863
  - Succeeded by: Alten Municipality and Talvig Municipality
- Administrative centre: Alta

Area (upon dissolution)
  - Total: 3,849.47 km^{2} (1,486.29 sq mi)
- Highest elevation: 1,149 m (3,770 ft)

Population (1863)
  - Total: 4,380
  - Density: 1.14/km^{2} (2.95/sq mi)
- Demonym(s): Altaværing; Talvikværing; Talviking
- Time zone: UTC+01:00 (CET)
  - Summer (DST): UTC+02:00 (CEST)
- ISO 3166 code: NO-2012

Alta-Talvik or Alten-Talvig is a former municipality in Finnmark county, Norway. The 3,849-square-kilometre (1,486 sq mi) municipality existed from 1838 until its dissolution in 1863. It was located along the Altafjorden and the river Altaelva with the same borders as the present-day Alta Municipality. The administrative centre was the village of Alta (in 2000, the village was declared a town). The European route E6 highway runs through the area today. Some of the notable villages in the municipality included Kåfjord, Komagfjord, Kvenvik, Langenes, Langfjordbotn, Leirbotn, Rafsbotn, Talvig, and Tverrelvdalen.

The Church of Norway had churches in Alten-Talvig: Alta Church, Talvik Church, and Kåfjord Church.

== History ==
The parish of Alten-Talvig was established as a municipality on 1 January 1838 (see formannskapsdistrikt law). According to the 1835 census, the area had a population of 3,085. In 1863, the municipality of Alten-Talvig was dissolved and its area was split to create two new municipalities: Alten Municipality (population: 2,442) in the south and Talvig Municipality (population: 1,938) in the north. The two municipalities lasted for 101 years independently. During the 1960s, there were many municipal mergers across Norway due to the work of the Schei Committee. On 1 January 1964, Talvik and Alta were merged back together to form the new Alta Municipality.

=== Name ===
The parishes of Alten and Talvig were combined to form the municipality in 1838 and it was named Alten-Talvig, by combining the two old parish names together. During its existence, the name was always spelled Alten-Talvig, however, after this time, there were spelling reforms for the Norwegian language and the correct present-day spelling is Alta-Talvik, so that is the spelling that is commonly seen now, although it was never spelled that way during its existence.

The first element comes from the local Altafjorden. The name possibly comes from the Old Norse words ǫlpt or alpt which refer to a swan. It could also be the Norwegianization of the Finnish word (alaattia) which refers to a "lowland". Prior to 1918, the name was written Alten.

The second element of the name comes from the old Talvig farm since the first Talvik Church was built there. The first element of the name is rather uncertain. If the first part was of Old Norse origin then it is derived from the word Þelli which means "pine" (due to the large number of pine trees in the area). The other explanation is that it is a corruption of the Northern Sami word Dálbme or the longer name Dálbmeluokta which translates as "fog" or "fog bay". The early Norwegian settlers would have translated that as tåkebukta (meaning "fog bay") and this could have been corrupted from tåke to tal. The last part of the name is vík which means "inlet" or "cove".

== Geography ==
The municipality was located along the Altafjorden and the inland areas around the Altaelva river. The municipality also included the southern parts of the islands of Seiland and Stjernøya. The highest point in the municipality was the 1,149-metre (3,770 ft) tall mountain Store Haldi.

== Government ==
While it existed, Alten-Talvig Municipality was governed by a municipal council of directly elected representatives. The mayor was indirectly elected by a vote of the municipal council. The municipality was under the jurisdiction of the Hålogaland Court of Appeal.

=== Mayors ===
The mayor (Norwegian: ordfører) of Alta-Talvik Municipality was the political leader of the municipality and the chairperson of the municipal council. The following people have held this position:

- 1838–1842: John Andreas Gill
- 1843–1845: Ellert Michael Ellertsen
- 1845–1847: Niels Frederik Julius Aars
- 1847–1849: Theodor Bergmann Borchgrevink
- 1849–1851: Carl Norum
- 1851–1853: Theodor Bergmann Borchgrevink
- 1853–1855: Thomas Thomesen
- 1855–1857: Theodor Bergmann Borchgrevink
- 1857–1859: Lars Olsen Follum
- 1859–1861: Martin Heggelund Hjort Stuwitz
- 1861–1863: Lars Olsen Follum

== See also ==
- List of former municipalities of Norway
