= Talvik =

Talvik may refer to:

- Alta-Talvik, a former municipality in Finnmark county, Norway
- Talvik (municipality), a former municipality in Finnmark county, Norway
- Talvik, Norway, village in Alta municipality in Finnmark county, Norway
- Talvik Church, a church in Alta municipality in Finnmark county, Norway
- Talvik (surname)
