= Langnes =

Langnes may refer to:

== Places ==
=== Antarctica ===
- Langnes Fjord, a fjord in Antarctica
- Langnes Peninsula, a peninsula in Antarctica

=== Norway ===
- Langnes, Finnmark, a village in Alta Municipality in Finnmark county, Norway
- Langnes, Troms, a village in Senja Municipality in Troms county, Norway
- Langnes, Østfold, a village in Indre Østfold Municipality in Østfold county, Norway
- Langnes Airport in the city of Tromsø, also known as Tromsø Airport
- Langnes Station, a railway station located at Langnes in Indre Østfold Municipality on the Østfold Line

== People ==
- Ole Arvid Langnes, a retired Norwegian football goalkeeper

== Other ==
- Battle of Langnes, a battle fought between Norway and Sweden as a part of the Swedish-Norwegian War of 1814

== See also ==
- Langness
- Langenes (disambiguation)
- Langeness
