= Måsøy =

Måsøy or Måsøya may refer to:

== Places ==
- Måsøy Municipality, a municipality in Finnmark county, Norway
- Måsøy (village), a village in Måsøy Municipality in Finnmark county, Norway
- Måsøya, an island in Måsøy Municipality in Finnmark county, Norway
- Måsøy Church, a church in Måsøy Municipality in Finnmark county, Norway
