= Langenes =

Langenes may refer to the following places in Norway:

- Langenes Municipality, a former municipality in Nordland county
- Langenes Church, a church in Øksnes Municipality, Nordland county
- Langenes, Agder, a village in Kristiansand Municipality, Agder county
- Langenes, Finnmark, a village in Alta Municipality in Finnmark county
- Langenes, Vestland, a village in Kinn Municipality, Vestland county

== See also ==
- Langnes (disambiguation)
- Langeness or Langeneß
