= Ingøy Church =

- Ingøy kirke
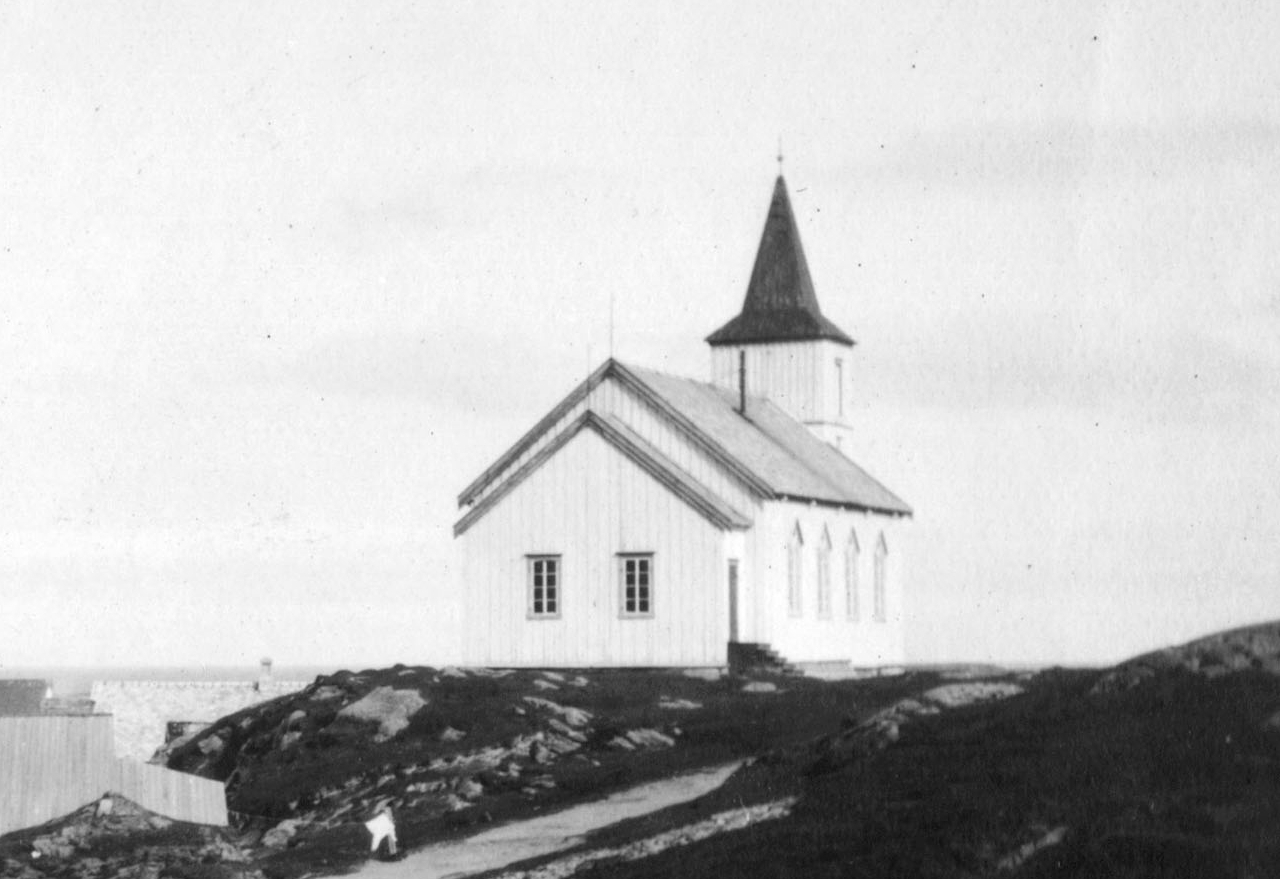
- The previous church, which was burned to the ground in 1944
- Ingøy Church
- 71.081641°N 24.060372°E
- Location: Måsøy Municipality, Finnmark
- Country: Norway
- Denomination: Church of Norway
- Churchmanship: Evangelical Lutheran

History
- Status: Parish church
- Founded: 14th century
- Consecrated: 1957

Architecture
- Functional status: Active
- Architect: Eyvind Moestue
- Architectural type: Long church
- Completed: 1957 (69 years ago)

Specifications
- Capacity: 120
- Materials: Concrete and wood

Administration
- Diocese: Nord-Hålogaland
- Deanery: Hammerfest prosti
- Parish: Måsøy
- Norwegian Cultural Heritage Site
- Type: Church
- Status: Not protected
- ID: 84723

Ingøy Church (Norwegian: Ingøy kirke) is a parish church of the Church of Norway in Måsøy Municipality in Finnmark county, Norway. It is located in the village of Ingøy on the island of Ingøya. It is one of the churches for the Måsøy parish which is part of the Hammerfest prosti (deanery) in the Diocese of Nord-Hålogaland.

Like most other churches in Finnmark, Ingøy church was burned down by the Germans during the evacuation of Finnmark in 1944. The new, white church was built in a long church style in 1957 using plans drawn up by the architect Eyvind Moestue. The church seats about 120 people. The altarpiece was rescued when the old church was burning, and it now hangs behind the altar in the church. The subject is Jesus and his disciples at the Sea of Galilee when Jesus calms the storm. The picture was painted by Christian Sinding Larsen in 1930.

== History ==
The earliest existing historical records of the church date back to the year 1589, but the church was probably built during the 14th century. The first church was located on the island of Ingøya, about 500 metres (1,600 ft) northwest of the present-day site of the church. By the early 1700s, the church was in poor condition. In 1709, the church was torn down and replaced with a new church that was completed in 1712 and consecrated in 1714.

By the mid-1700s, Ingøya's population had declined to just a few people and in 1747 the church in Ingøy was moved to Måsøya, where it was rebuilt as Måsøy Church. Ingøy had no church from 1747 until 1866 when a new church was constructed at Ingøy. This church was heavily damaged in a hurricane in the early 1880s and had it to be rebuilt in 1883. That church remained until it was burned down by the German forces when they retreated from Finnmark in 1944. The current church was built between 1956 and 1957.

== See also ==
- List of churches in Nord-Hålogaland
