= Cornelius Karlstrøm =

Norwegian politician

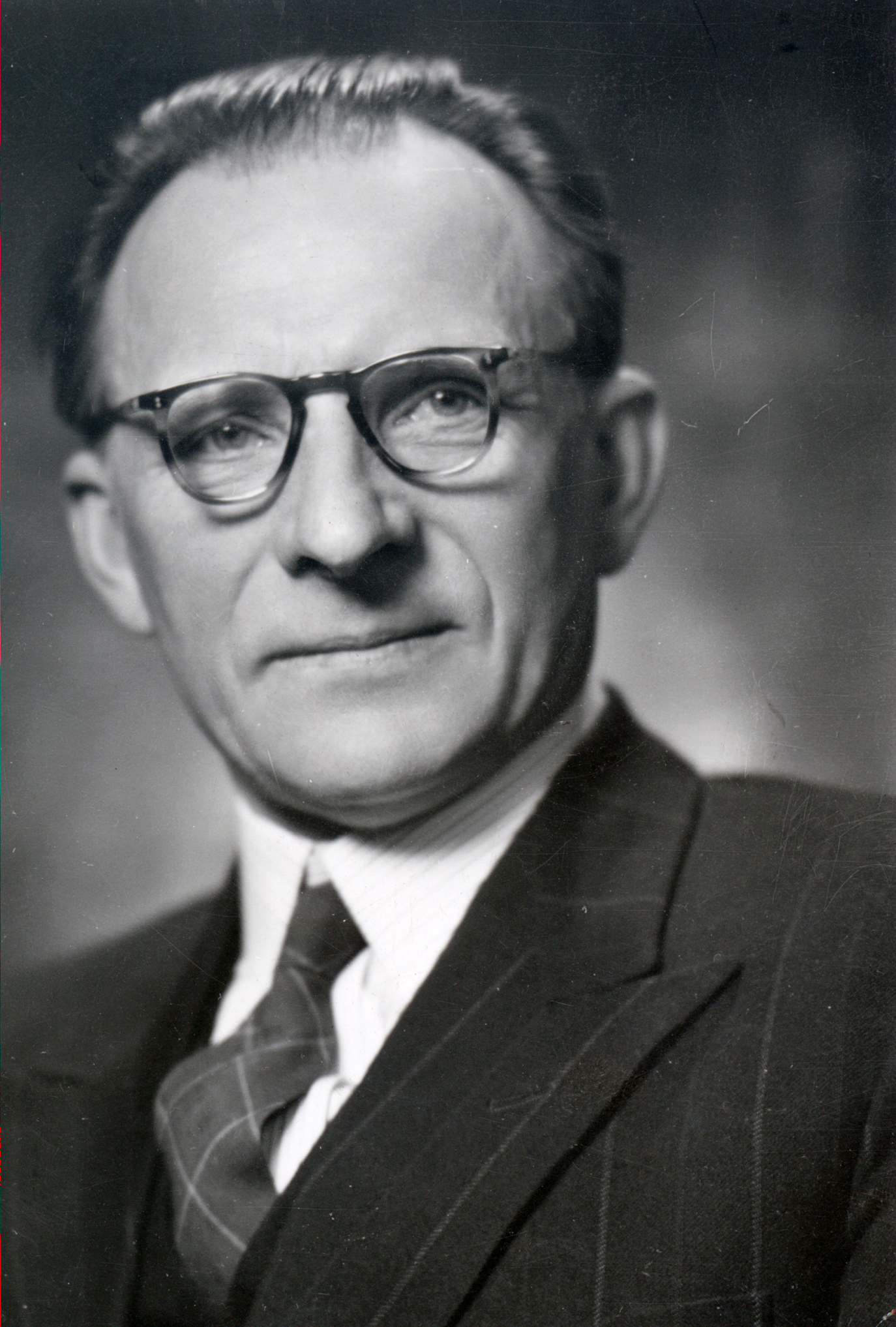

Cornelius Karlstrøm (2 March 1897 – 19 September 1978) was a Norwegian politician for the Labour Party.

He was born in Talvik.

He was elected to the Norwegian Parliament from Finnmark in 1950, but was not re-elected in 1954. Instead he served in the position of deputy representative during the term 1954–1957.

Karlstrøm was a member of Talvik municipality council from 1931 to 1940 and 1945 to 1955, serving as mayor in the periods 1945–1947 and 1947–1951.
