= Rafsbotn Chapel =

- Rafsbotn kapell
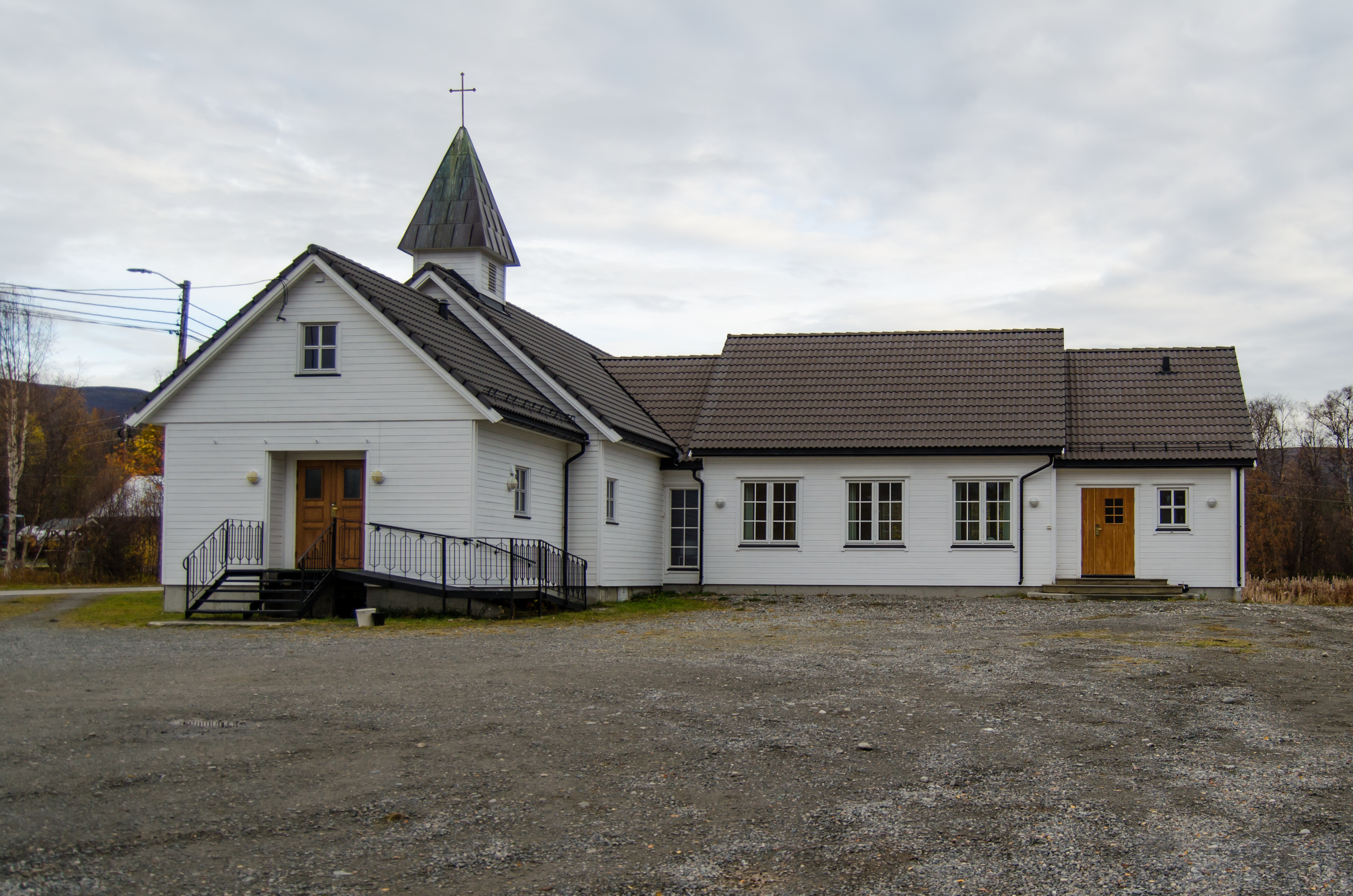
- View of the church
- Rafsbotn Chapel
- 70.018949°N 23.534228°E
- Location: Alta Municipality, Finnmark
- Country: Norway
- Denomination: Church of Norway
- Churchmanship: Evangelical Lutheran

History
- Status: Parish church
- Founded: 1920
- Consecrated: 27 Aug 1989

Architecture
- Functional status: Active
- Architect(s): Arne Rasmussen and Asbjørn Nilsen
- Architectural type: Long church
- Completed: 1989 (37 years ago)

Specifications
- Capacity: 100
- Materials: Wood

Administration
- Diocese: Nord-Hålogaland
- Deanery: Alta prosti
- Parish: Alta

Rafsbotn Chapel (Norwegian: Rafsbotn kapell) is a parish church of the Church of Norway in Alta Municipality in Finnmark county, Norway. It is located in the village of Rafsbotn. It is one of the churches for the Alta parish which is part of the Alta prosti (deanery) in the Diocese of Nord-Hålogaland. The white, wooden church was built in a long church style in 1989 using plans drawn up by the architects Arne Rasmussen and Asbjørn Nilsen. The church seats about 100 people.

== History ==
The first chapel in Rafsbotn was built around 1920. Money was raised through raffles, bazaars, gifts and volunteer work. The house was built of timber, and it was burned by the Germans in 1944. A new chapel was completed in 1949 and it was somewhat larger. It was financed through war damages and mortgages. The Laestadians were the owners of the chapel. In 1988, the Alta parish took over the ownership of the chapel and at that time it was rebuilt and restored with the intention of converting it into a full church for use by the parish. This work was carried out by contractor Arne Rasmussen. On Sunday, 27 August 1989, the building was consecrated as a church by Bishop Arvid H. Nergård.

== See also ==
- List of churches in Nord-Hålogaland
