= Valjok Church =

- Valjok kirke
- Valjok Church
- 69.6918261°N 25.9314466°E
- Location: Karasjok Municipality, Finnmark
- Country: Norway
- Denomination: Church of Norway
- Churchmanship: Evangelical Lutheran

History
- Former name: Valjok kapell
- Status: Parish church
- Founded: 1932
- Consecrated: 1932

Architecture
- Functional status: Active
- Architect: Harald Sund
- Architectural type: Long church
- Completed: 1932 (94 years ago)

Specifications
- Capacity: 60
- Materials: Wood

Administration
- Diocese: Nord-Hålogaland
- Deanery: Indre Finnmark prosti
- Parish: Karasjok
- Norwegian Cultural Heritage Site
- Type: Church
- Status: Not protected
- ID: 85747

Valjok Church (Norwegian: Valjok kirke) is a parish church of the Church of Norway in Karasjok Municipality in Finnmark county, Norway. It is located in the village of Váljohka. It is an annex chapel for the Karasjok parish which is part of the Indre Finnmark prosti (deanery) in the Diocese of Nord-Hålogaland.

The small, red, wooden church was built in a long church style in 1932 by the architect Harald Sund. The church was built to serve the inhabitants in the northeastern part of the municipality, along the Tana River. The church seats about 60 people. The interior colouring is remarkable, with strong red and blue detail set against golden, unpainted woodwork. These are interpreted as the traditional colours of the gákti (the traditional Sami costume) and they are a standard feature of Sami décor.

== See also ==
- List of churches in Nord-Hålogaland
