= Langfjord Church =

- Langfjord kirke
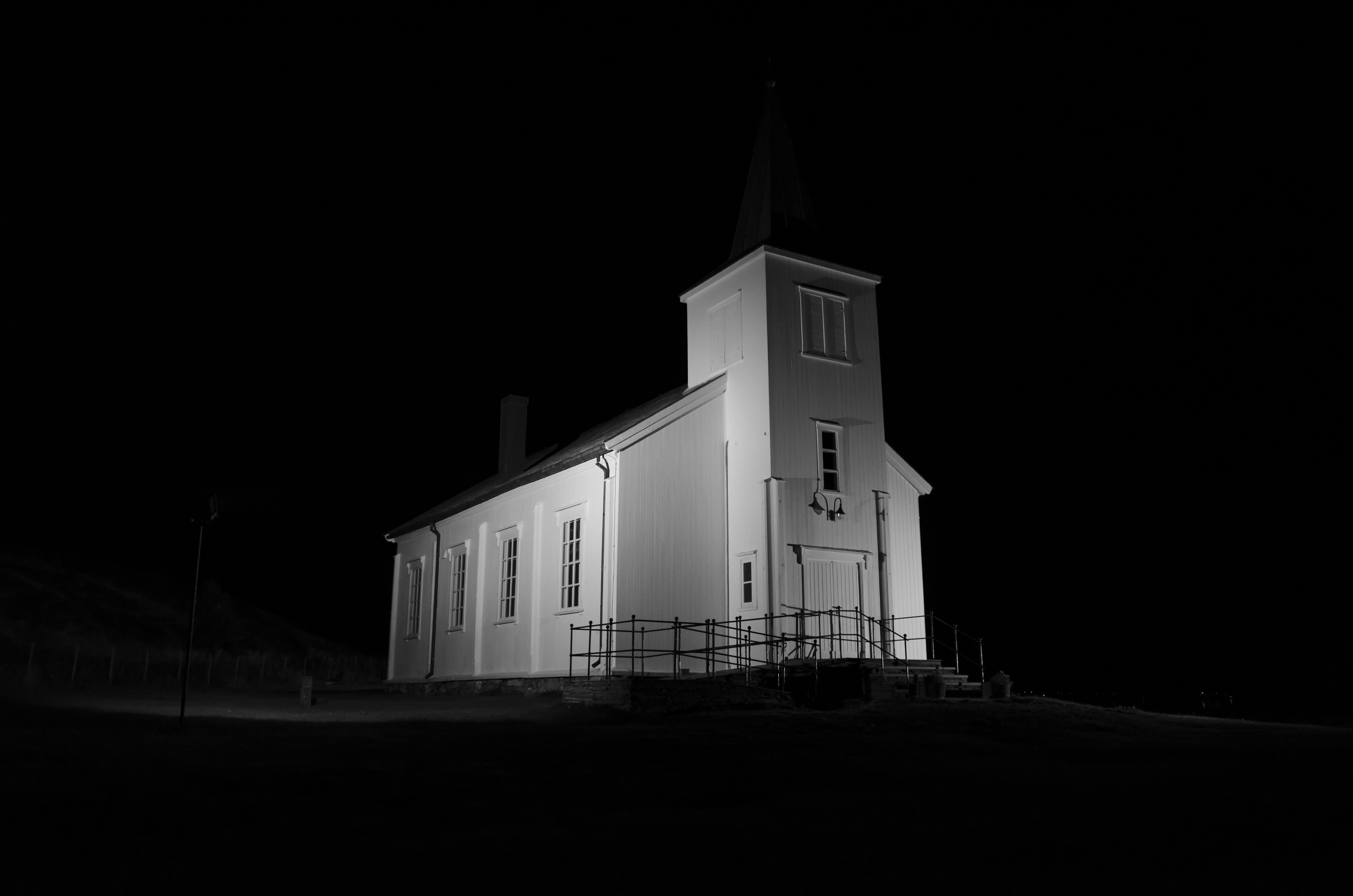
- View of the church
- Langfjord Church
- 70.055974°N 22.362594°E
- Location: Alta Municipality, Finnmark
- Country: Norway
- Denomination: Church of Norway
- Churchmanship: Evangelical Lutheran

History
- Status: Parish church
- Founded: 1891
- Consecrated: 20 August 1891

Architecture
- Functional status: Active
- Architect: Tygen
- Architectural type: Long church
- Completed: 1891 (135 years ago)

Specifications
- Capacity: 180
- Materials: Wood

Administration
- Diocese: Nord-Hålogaland
- Deanery: Alta prosti
- Parish: Talvik
- Norwegian Cultural Heritage Site
- Type: Church
- Status: Listed
- ID: 84901

Langfjord Church (Norwegian: Langfjord kirke) is a parish church of the Church of Norway in Alta Municipality in Finnmark county, Norway. It is located in the village of Langfjordbotn. It is one of the churches for the Talvik parish which is part of the Alta prosti (deanery) in the Diocese of Nord-Hålogaland. The white, wooden church was built in a long church style in 1891 using plans drawn up by the architect Tygen. The church seats about 180 people.

== History ==
The church was built in 1891 to serve the people of the Langfjordbotn area since it was a long journey to the main parish church. The church cost about 9000 kr. By 1904, the congregation had grown, so the nave was enlarged and lengthed to add about 25% more seating. The building was consecrated on 20 August 1891 by the Bishop Johannes Skaar. By the end of World War II, the church had been significantly looted and battered by the retreating German army which had used the building for their own purposes. The church was fixed up after the war. It wasn't until 1965, however, when the structural damage to the church was repaired.

== Media gallery ==
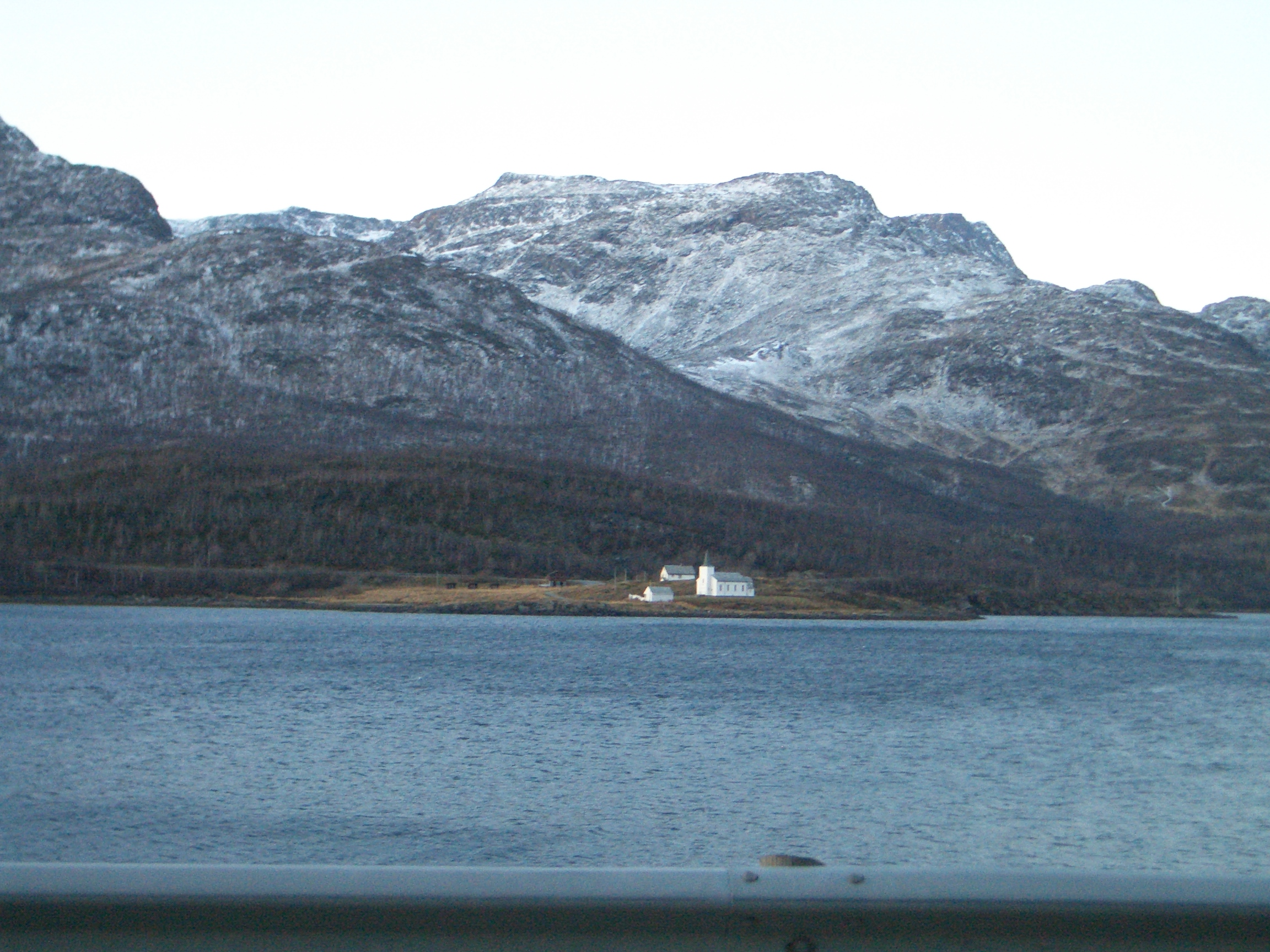
View from a distance

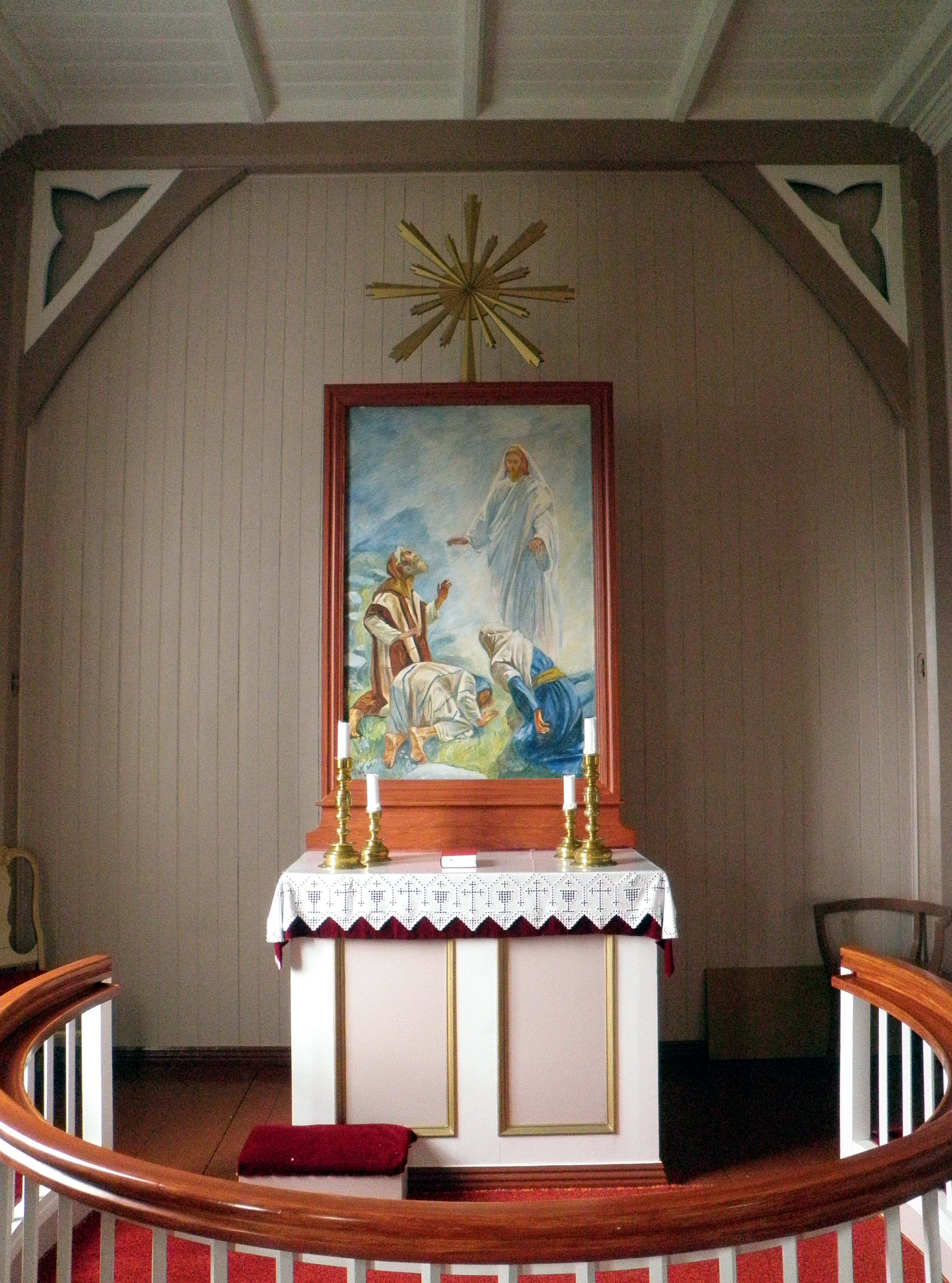
The altar

== See also ==
- List of churches in Nord-Hålogaland
