= Ole Arvid Langnes =

Norwegian footballer (born 1971)

Personal information
- Full name: Ole Arvid Pettersen Langnes
- Date of birth: 16 July 1971 (age 55)
- Height: 1.90 m (6 ft 3 in)
- Position: Goalkeeper

Youth career
- Grand Bodø

Senior career*
Years	Team	Apps	(Gls)
- Bodø/Glimt
1992	Bærum		
1993	Ski		
1994–1995	Bodø/Glimt		
1996–2002	Kongsvinger	139	(0)
2003–2006	Bodø/Glimt		
2004	→ Fauske/Sprint (loan)		
- * Club domestic league appearances and goals

Ole Arvid Langnes (born 16 July 1971) is a retired Norwegian football goalkeeper.

He started his career in IK Grand Bodø, and was a reserve goalkeeper in FK Bodø/Glimt before joining Bærum SK in 1992. In 1994, he joined Bodø/Glimt from Ski IL. Ahead of the 1996 season he joined Kongsvinger IL. He only missed four games in his first four seasons, and was ever-present in 1997 and 1998. His downturn came in 2001 and 2002, when he played only 20 of 56 league games. He rejoined Bodø/Glimt ahead of the 2003 season. In the first half of 2004 he was loaned out to FK Fauske/Sprint. His career ended in mid-2006 after an injury.

In July 2007 in Misvær he married businesswoman Inger Ellen Nicolaisen.
