= Leirbotn Church =

- Leirbotn kirke
- Leirbotn Church
- 70.118764°N 23.397499°E
- Location: Alta Municipality, Finnmark
- Country: Norway
- Denomination: Church of Norway
- Churchmanship: Evangelical Lutheran

History
- Status: Parish church
- Founded: 1935
- Consecrated: 17 Oct 1993

Architecture
- Functional status: Active
- Architect: Peer Stockholm
- Architectural type: Rectangular
- Completed: 1993 (33 years ago)

Specifications
- Capacity: 160
- Materials: Wood

Administration
- Diocese: Nord-Hålogaland
- Deanery: Alta prosti
- Parish: Talvik
- Norwegian Cultural Heritage Site
- Type: Church
- Status: Not protected
- ID: 84281

Leirbotn Church (Norwegian: Leirbotn kirke) is a parish church of the Church of Norway in Alta Municipality in Finnmark county, Norway. It is located in the village of Leirbotn. It is one of the churches for the Talvik parish which is part of the Alta prosti (deanery) in the Diocese of Nord-Hålogaland. The white, wooden church was built in a rectangular style in 1993 using plans drawn up by the architect Peer Stockholm. The church seats about 160 people.

== History ==
The old, wooden church was built in 1935. It was consecrated by Bishop Eivind Berggrav. The church had 256 seats and the tower had an onion dome. The old church caught on fire and burned to the ground on 18 June 1990. It was a day of mourning for the village and the congregation. The foundation stone for the new church was laid on 31 January 1993. The new, white, wooden church was completed in the fall of 1993 and it was consecrated on 17 October 1993 by the Bishop Ola Steinholt.

== See also ==
- List of churches in Nord-Hålogaland
