= Måsøy Church =

- Måsøy kirke
- Måsøy Church
- 71.008367°N 24.999351°E
- Location: Måsøy Municipality, Finnmark
- Country: Norway
- Denomination: Church of Norway
- Churchmanship: Evangelical Lutheran

History
- Status: Parish church
- Founded: 17th century
- Consecrated: 1953

Architecture
- Functional status: Active
- Architect: Eyvind Moestue
- Architectural type: Long church
- Completed: 1953 (73 years ago)

Specifications
- Capacity: 120
- Materials: Concrete

Administration
- Diocese: Nord-Hålogaland
- Deanery: Hammerfest prosti
- Parish: Måsøy
- Norwegian Cultural Heritage Site
- Type: Church
- Status: Not protected
- ID: 85088

Måsøy Church (Norwegian: Måsøy kirke) is a parish church of the Church of Norway in Måsøy Municipality in Finnmark county, Norway. It is located in village of Måsøy on the island of Måsøya. It is one of the churches for the Måsøy parish which is part of the Hammerfest prosti (deanery) in the Diocese of Nord-Hålogaland. The white, concrete church was built in a long church style in 1953 using plans drawn up by the architect Eyvind Moestue. The church seats about 120 people.

== History ==
The first church on Måsøya was a small wooden chapel that was built in the 1600s, but before 1668. In 1747 the old church was torn down and the old Ingøy Church was moved here and rebuilt on the same site. That church lasted for some time. A new church was built on Måsøya in 1865. Like most other churches in Finnmark, Måsøy Church was burned down by the Germans during the evacuation of Finnmark in 1944. A new church was completed in 1953 to replace the old one. It was built a little south of the old church site. The new church was designed by architect Eyvind Moestue to have the same principal setup as the earlier timber church built in 1865.

== See also ==
- List of churches in Nord-Hålogaland
