= Komagfjord Church =

- Komagfjord kirke
- Komagfjord Church
- 70.259075°N 23.415846°E
- Location: Alta Municipality, Finnmark
- Country: Norway
- Denomination: Church of Norway
- Churchmanship: Evangelical Lutheran

History
- Status: Parish church

Architecture
- Functional status: Active
- Architect(s): Turid and Kristen; Bernhoff Evensen
- Architectural type: Cruciform
- Completed: 1960 (66 years ago)

Specifications
- Capacity: 250
- Materials: Wood

Administration
- Diocese: Nord-Hålogaland
- Deanery: Alta prosti
- Parish: Talvik
- Norwegian Cultural Heritage Site
- Type: Church
- Status: Not protected
- ID: 84808

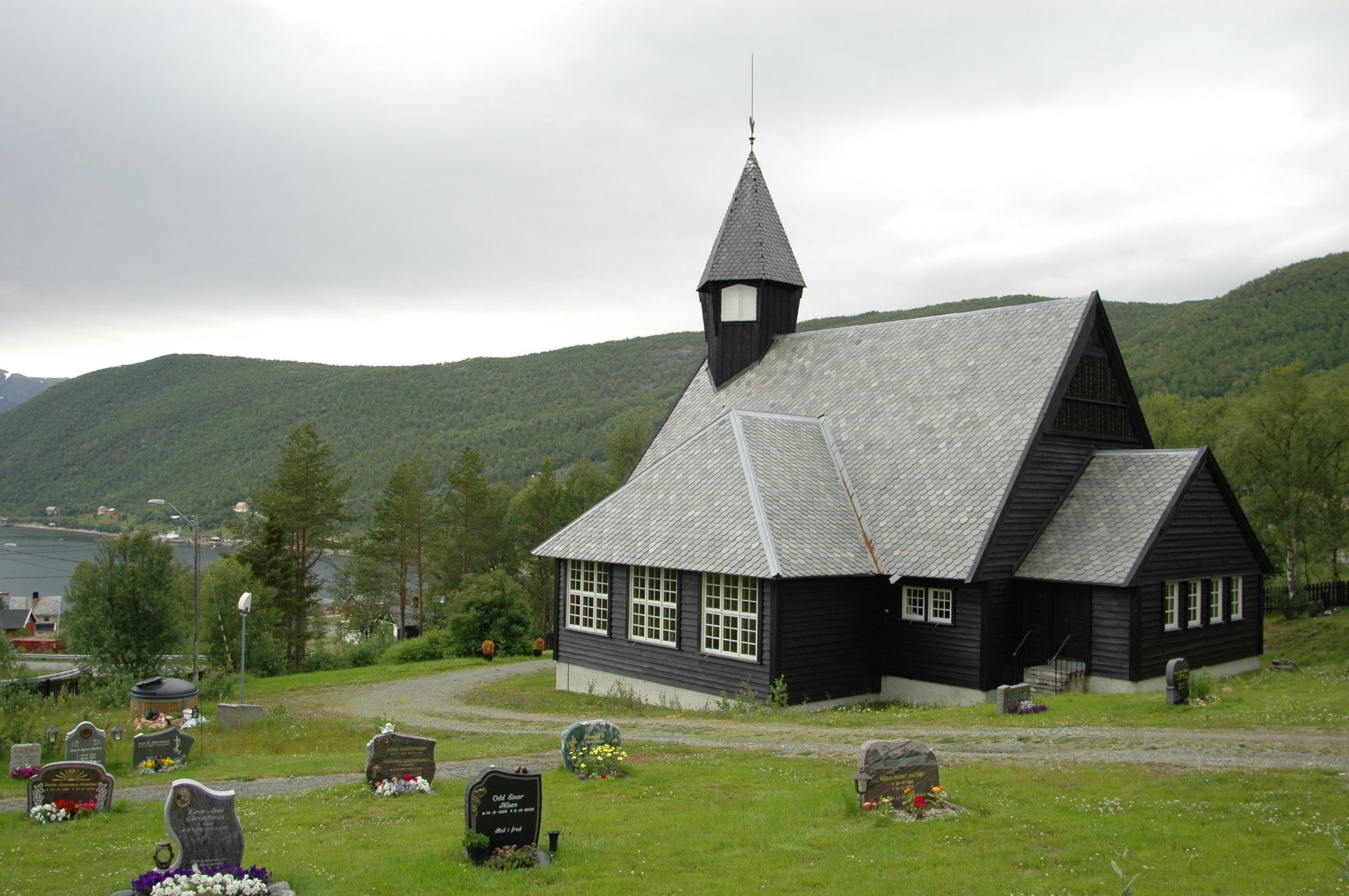
Komagfjord kirke, Alta kommune.jpg

Komagfjord Church (Norwegian: Komagfjord kirke) is a parish church of the Church of Norway in Alta Municipality in Finnmark county, Norway. It is located in the village of Komagfjord. It is one of the churches for the Talvik parish which is part of the Alta prosti (deanery) in the Diocese of Nord-Hålogaland. The brown, wooden church was built in a cruciform style in 1960 using plans drawn up by the architects Turid and Kristen Bernhoff Evensen. The church seats about 250 people.

== History ==
The first church at Komagfjord was consecrated on 15 September 1887. It was a white church that was designed by the architect Jacob Wilhelm Nordan. The church was slightly up on the hill above the shop and pier. The church, along with many buildings in Finnmark county, was burned down by German soldiers as the fled the country in 1944, near the end of World War II.

Shortly after the war, a temporary building was constructed to replace the church. The new church was built a short distance away from the previous site because more room was needed for a cemetery and the previous site was unsafe due to past landslides. The new building was consecrated on 16 February 1947 by Bishop Wollert Krohn-Hansen. That temporary building was used for 13 years before a new church was finally built in 1960. The new permanent church was consecrated on 10 April 1960. In 1989-1990, the roof was redone with new slate.

== See also ==
- List of churches in Nord-Hålogaland
