= Váljohka =

Village in Karasjok, Norway

Váljohka (Northern Sami) Valjohka (Norwegian)
- Village
- Interactive map of Váljohka (Northern Sami)
- Location within Finnmark Location within Norway
- Coordinates: 69.6908°N 25.9285°E
- Country: Norway
- Region: Northern Norway
- County: Finnmark
- District: Vest-Finnmark
- Municipality: Karasjok
- Elevation: 130 m (430 ft)
- Time zone: UTC+01:00 (CET)
  - Summer (DST): UTC+02:00 (CEST)
- Post Code: 9730 Karasjok

Váljohka is a village in Karasjok Municipality in Finnmark county, Norway. The village is located at the confluence of the rivers Váljohka and Tana. The village lies right along the Norway-Finland border in the eastern part of the municipality. The European route E06 highway runs through the village. Valjok Church is located in a forested area near the center of the village.
