= Talvik (surname) =

Talvik is an Estonian surname. Notable people with the surname include:

- Artur Talvik (born 1964), Estonian filmmaker and politician
- Elisabet Talvik, the name by the first marriage of Betti Alver, (1906 – 1989), Estonian poetess
- Heiti Talvik (1904–1947), Estonian poet
- Mati Talvik (1942–2018), Estonian television journalist
- Merle Talvik (born 1954), Estonian actress
- Sofia Talvik (born 1978), Swedish musician and singer/songwriter
