= Rafsbotn =

Village in Alta Municipality, Norway

Rafsbotn (Norwegian); Reaššvuonna (Northern Sami); Rässivuono (Kven)
- Village
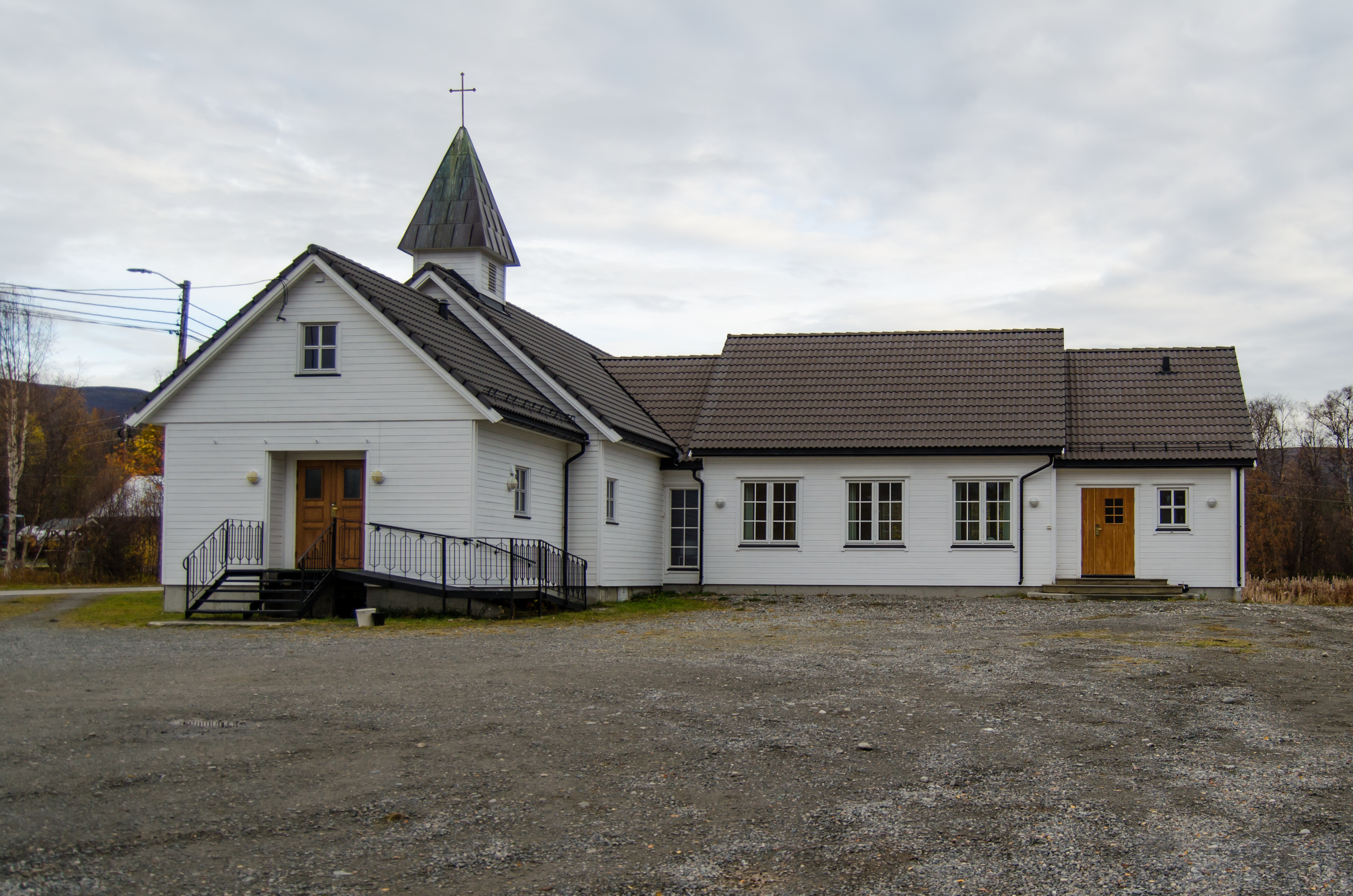
- Rafsbotn Chapel
- Interactive map of: Rafsbotn (Norwegian); Reaššvuonna (Northern Sami); Rässivuono (Kven)
- Location within Finnmark Location within Norway
- Coordinates: 70°01′07″N 23°32′14″E
- Country: Norway
- Region: Northern Norway
- County: Finnmark
- District: Vest-Finnmark
- Municipality: Alta Municipality

Area
  - Total: 0.37 km^{2} (0.14 sq mi)
- Elevation: 24 m (79 ft)

Population (2023)
  - Total: 456
  - Density: 1,232/km^{2} (3,190/sq mi)
- Time zone: UTC+01:00 (CET)
  - Summer (DST): UTC+02:00 (CEST)
- Post Code: 9517 Alta

Rafsbotn (Norwegian), Reaššvuonna (Northern Sami), or Rässivuono (Kven) is a village in Alta Municipality in Finnmark county, Norway. The village sits at the southeast end of the Altafjorden, along the European route E6 highway, about 12 kilometres (7.5 mi) northeast of the town of Alta. The name comes from the Sami place name Ráššvuotna which means a clay seabed.

The 0.37-square-kilometre (91-acre) village has a population (2023) of 456 and a population density of 1,232 inhabitants per square kilometre (3,190/sq mi).

Rafsbotn Chapel and a skiing facility are both located in Rafsbotn.
