= Leirbotn =

Village in Alta Municipality, Norway

- Village
- Interactive map of Leirbotn
- Location within Finnmark Location within Norway
- Coordinates: 70°07′08″N 23°23′28″E
- Country: Norway
- Region: Northern Norway
- County: Finnmark
- District: Vest-Finnmark
- Municipality: Alta Municipality
- Elevation: 6 m (20 ft)
- Time zone: UTC+01:00 (CET)
  - Summer (DST): UTC+02:00 (CEST)
- Post Code: 9519 Kviby

Leirbotn is a village in Alta Municipality in Finnmark county, Norway. The village is located along the Altafjorden, about 6 kilometres (3.7 mi) west of the European route E06 highway in the northeastern part of Alta Municipality. The village, together with Kviby and Krokelv, form a little urban area about 30 kilometres (19 mi) north of the town of Alta. Leirbotn Church is located in this village.
