= Langfjordbotn, Alta =

Village in Alta Municipality, Norway

Langfjordbotn, Alta Langfjordbotn (Norwegian) Lákkovuonbahta (Northern Sami)
- Village
- Interactive map of Langfjordbotn, Alta
- Location within Finnmark Location within Norway
- Coordinates: 70°02′23″N 22°15′28″E
- Country: Norway
- Region: Northern Norway
- County: Finnmark
- District: Vest-Finnmark
- Municipality: Alta Municipality
- Elevation: 39 m (128 ft)

Population (2012)
  - Total: 114
- Time zone: UTC+01:00 (CET)
  - Summer (DST): UTC+02:00 (CEST)
- Post Code: 9545 Langfjordbotn

Langfjordbotn (Norwegian) or Lákkovuonbahta (Northern Sami) is a village in Alta Municipality in Finnmark county, Norway. Langfjordbotn is located at the innermost end of the Langfjorden, a part of the main Altafjorden. Langfjordbotn has a population (2012) of 114 residents. The village lies along the European route E06 highway, just east of the municipal (and county) border with Kvænangen Municipality. Langfjord Church lies about 4 kilometres (2.5 mi) northeast of the centre of the village, on the north shore of the fjord.

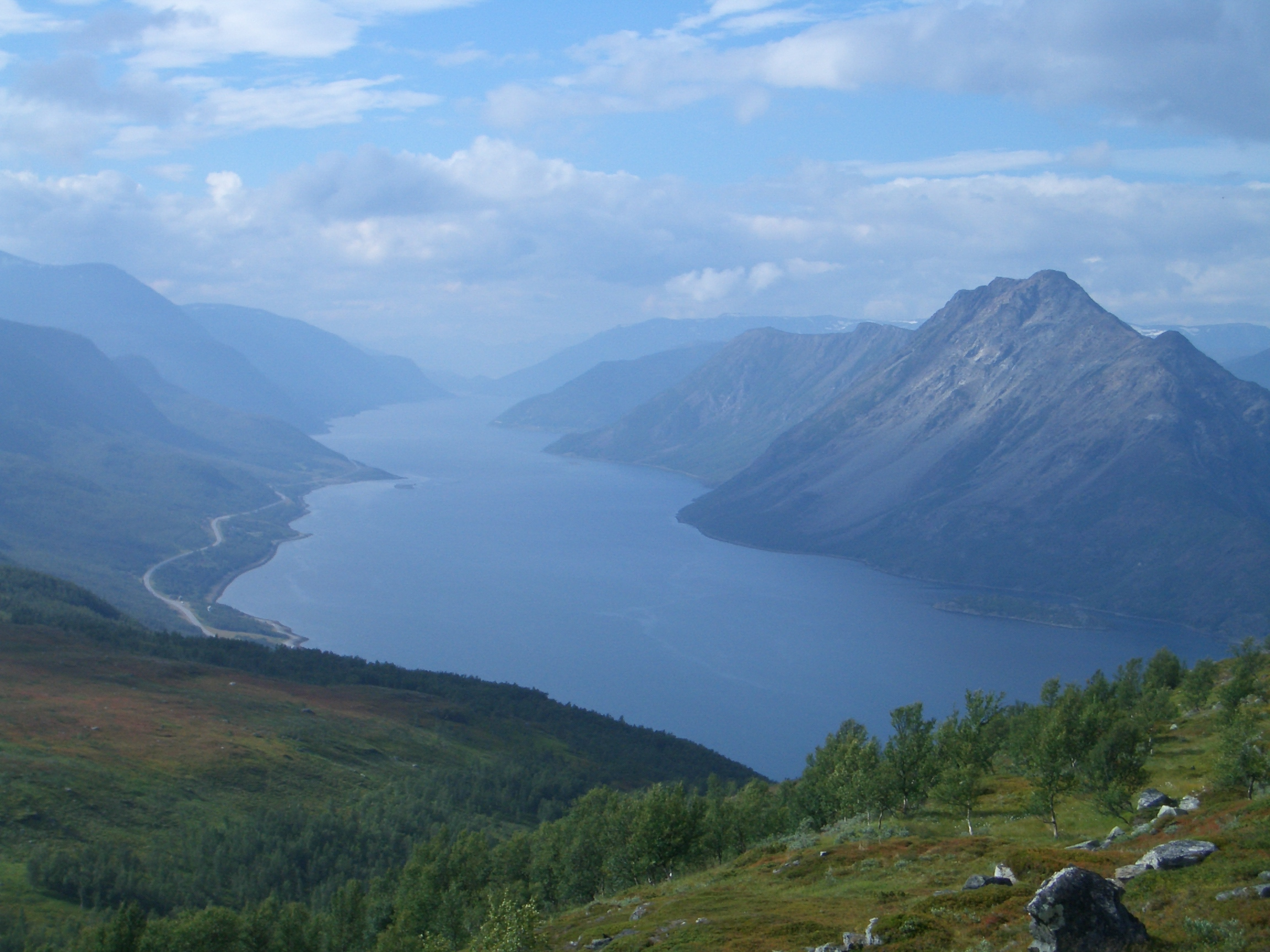
View of the Langfjorden, with Langfjordbotn at the near end of the fjord, but it is obstructed from view.

Langfjordbotn is known for its lush nature, and good conditions for growing potatoes and berries. Langfjordbotn is a popular destination for tourists from all over the world, most on their way to the North Cape, but many stay an extra day. In Bognelvdalen, a valley at the end of the fjord, there is an old tourist attraction called "Bubbelen". "Bubbelen" is the exit of an underground river, where the water comes gushing out and running into the river Bognelv, and is most spectacular in the spring when the flow of water is strongest.

There are five dairy farms, together with the local school and community center in Langfjordbotn. In addition to farming, there are some family-run tourism businesses as well as the Finnmarkskollektivet which deals with adolescents with substance abuse problems. The fjord is a versatile area for outdoor activities with the nearby fjords, plains, mountains, forests, and marshes. In winter, there are excellent conditions for skiing, summit hikes, snowmobile driving and sled dog racing.

The German battleship Scharnhorst had its base there during World War II.
