= Komagfjord =

Village in Alta Municipality, Norway

Komagfjord: Komagfjord (Norwegian); Gámabahta (Northern Sami)
- Village
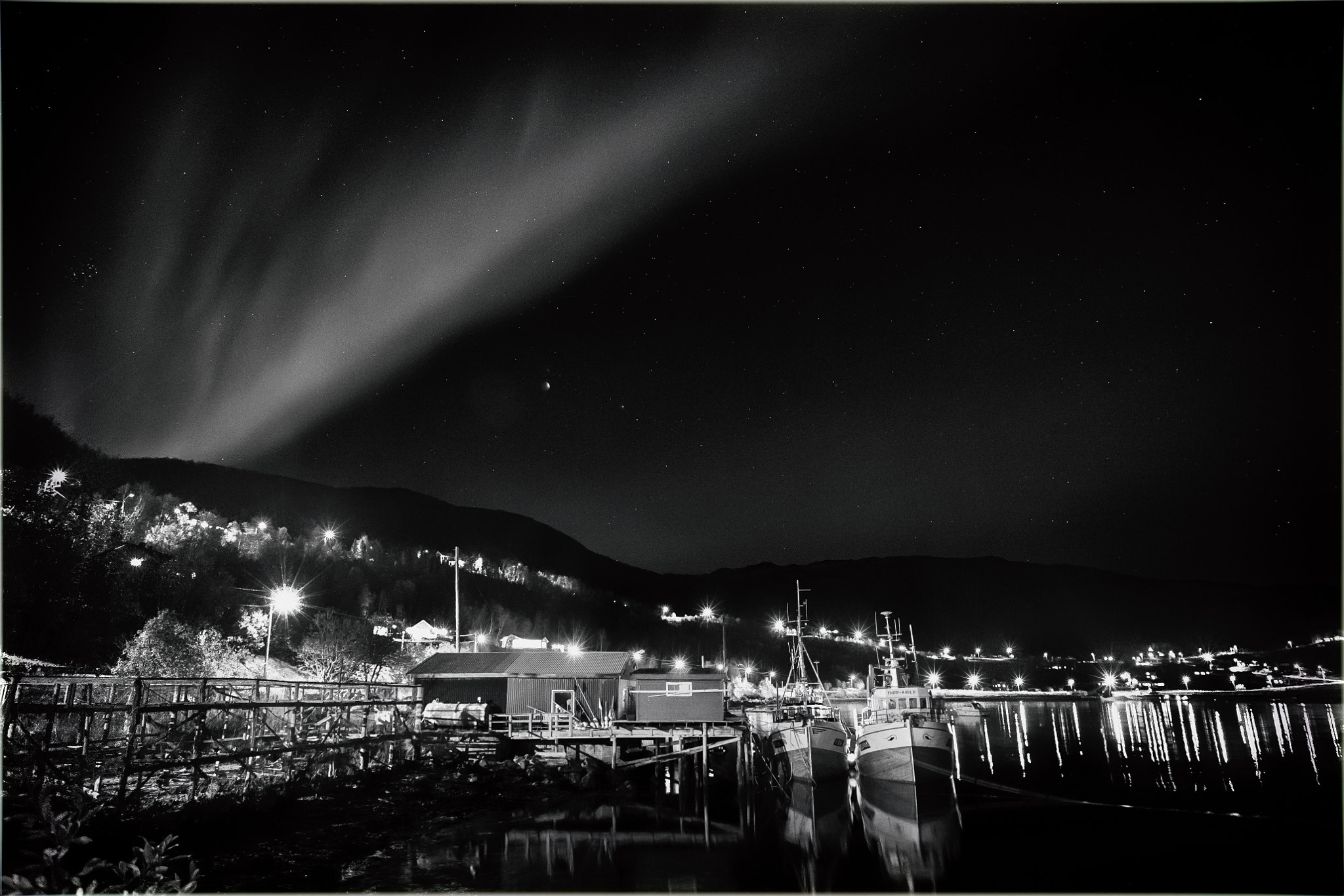
- Interactive map of Komagfjord
- Location within Finnmark Location within Norway
- Coordinates: 70°15′38″N 23°24′33″E
- Country: Norway
- Region: Northern Norway
- County: Finnmark
- District: Vest-Finnmark
- Municipality: Alta Municipality
- Elevation: 11 m (36 ft)
- Time zone: UTC+01:00 (CET)
  - Summer (DST): UTC+02:00 (CEST)
- Post Code: 9536 Korsfjorden

Komagfjord (Norwegian) or Gámabahta (Northern Sami) is a village in Alta Municipality in Finnmark county, Norway. The village is located along the Altafjorden on a fairly isolated peninsula in the northeastern part of the municipality. There is one ferry connection to the rest of Norway, but no road connections. The village looks across the fjord at the large island of Seiland. The village is home to Komagfjord Church.
