= Talvik Church =

- Talvik kirke
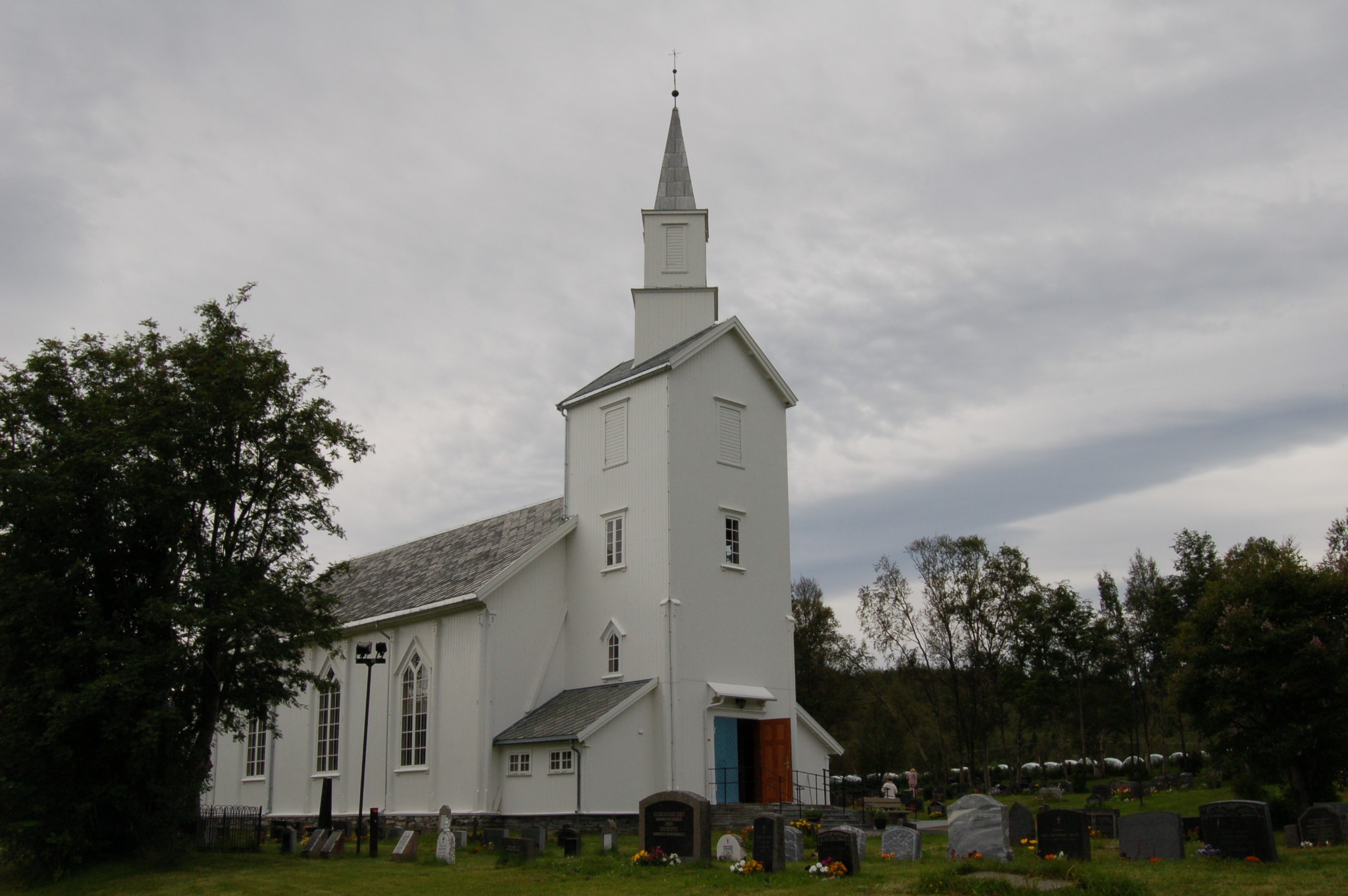
- View of the church
- Talvik Church
- 70.041695°N 22.949004°E
- Location: Alta Municipality, Finnmark
- Country: Norway
- Denomination: Church of Norway
- Churchmanship: Evangelical Lutheran

History
- Status: Parish church
- Founded: 1691
- Consecrated: 17 Oct 1883

Architecture
- Functional status: Active
- Architect: Jacob Wilhelm Nordan
- Architectural type: Long church
- Completed: 1883 (143 years ago)

Specifications
- Capacity: 300
- Materials: Wood

Administration
- Diocese: Nord-Hålogaland
- Deanery: Alta prosti
- Parish: Talvik
- Norwegian Cultural Heritage Site
- Type: Church
- Status: Listed
- ID: 85070

Talvik Church (Norwegian: Talvik kirke) is a parish church of the Church of Norway in Alta Municipality in Finnmark county, Norway. It is located in the village of Talvik, along the Altafjorden and the European route E06 highway. It is main church for the Talvik parish which is part of the Alta prosti (deanery) in the Diocese of Nord-Hålogaland. The white, wooden church was built in a long church style in 1883 using plans drawn up by the architect Jacob Wilhelm Nordan. The church seats about 300 people.

== History ==
The first church in the Altafjorden was built around the year 1691. The church was on the island of Årøya, in the middle of the fjord. The decision of the placement was that there was the old Altenhus Fortress on the island. The materials of the fortress were used to build the church. The fort was built during the Kalmar War and was a blockhouse with earthwork surrounding built to stop the Swedish advance in Finnmark. This blockhouse was given to the church and in 1694 the church was ready for use. It was also the first cemetery along the Altafjorden.

The Årøya Church was barely in use for about 10 years and already in 1703 the people were expressing a desire to move the church to the village of Talvik on the mainland, and the following year the county governor approved the move. Årøya Church was demolished and transported across the fjord to Talvik. In 1705, the church was ready for use in Talvik. This church was made into a cruciform church, so it was somewhat larger than the one that was on Årøya. Poor maintenance after the move meant that by 1734, the church already was in such poor condition that it is unable to be repaired. That building was demolished and a new church was completed in 1737. This church had 220 seats and room for 80 people to stand.

In 1814, this church served as an election church (Norwegian: valgkirke). Together with more than 300 other parish churches across Norway, it was a polling station for elections to the 1814 Norwegian Constituent Assembly which wrote the Constitution of Norway. This was Norway's first national elections. Each church parish was a constituency that elected people called "electors" who later met together in each county to elect the representatives for the assembly that was to meet in Eidsvoll later that year.

The 1737 church served Talvik for 147 years. On the night of 16 January 1882, there arose a violent storm and the whole church was torn loose and lifted from the foundation. The church bell and some of the interior furnishings were saved, but the structure could not be. It had to be demolished and a new church was constructed on the same site shortly thereafter. On 17 October 1883, the new (present) church was consecrated. This church was designed by Jacob Wilhelm Nordan and it has 410 seats and it cost 21,200 kr at that time.

The church was somewhat damaged after the German explosions when the retreating German army was leaving the village. The damage was mostly broken windows and roof tiles. The church was the only building left standing in Talvik after World War II.

== Media gallery ==
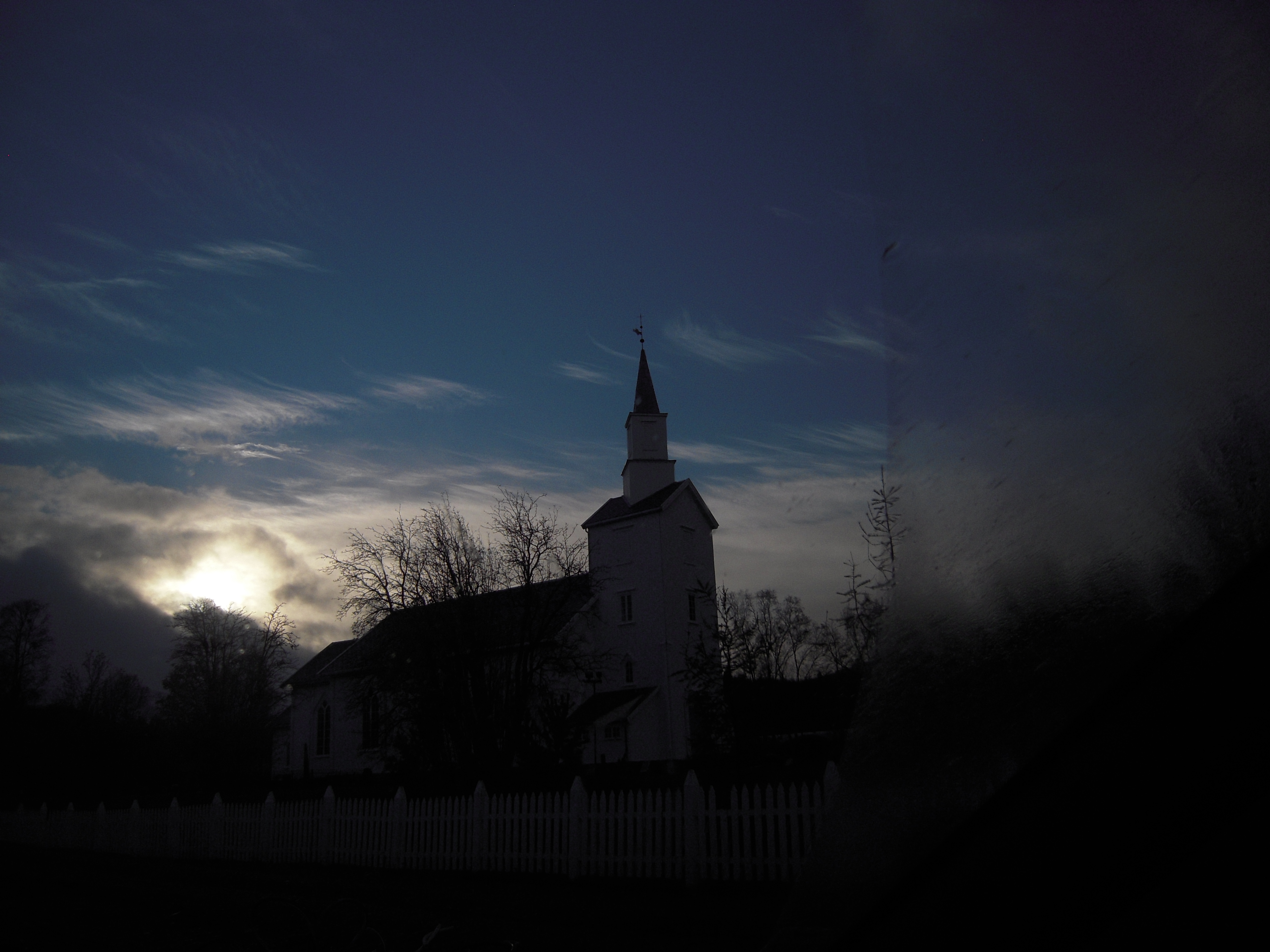

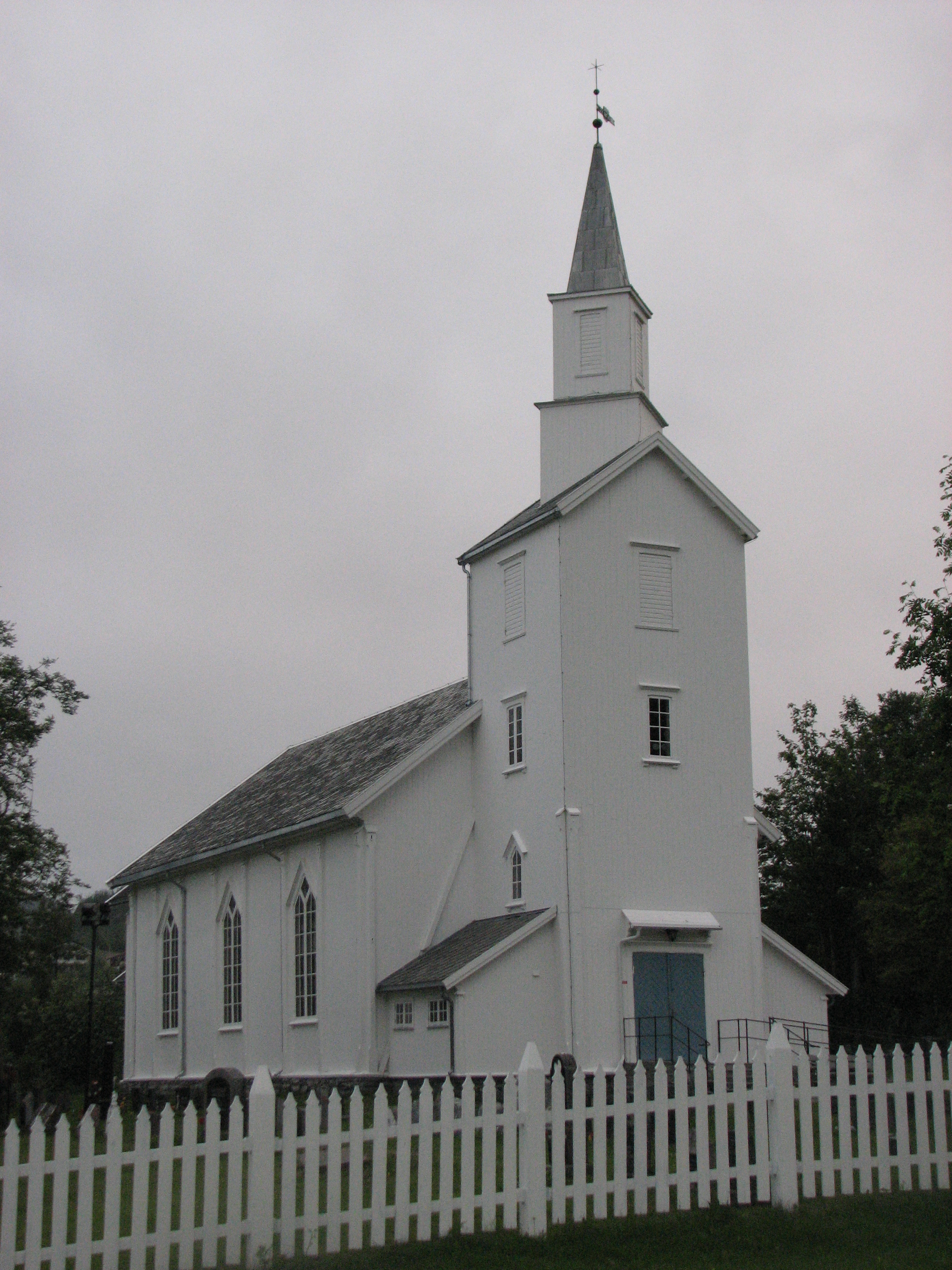

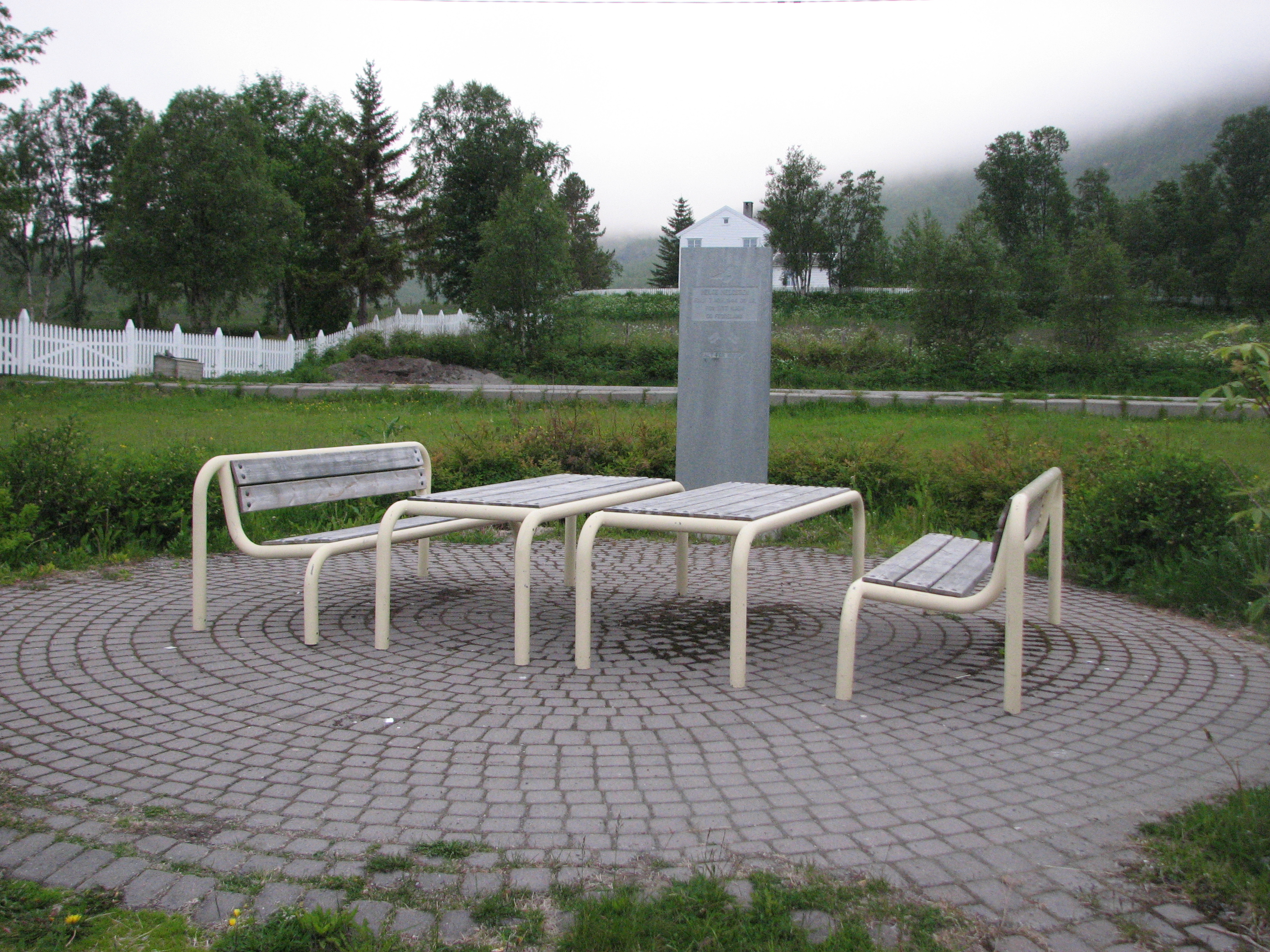

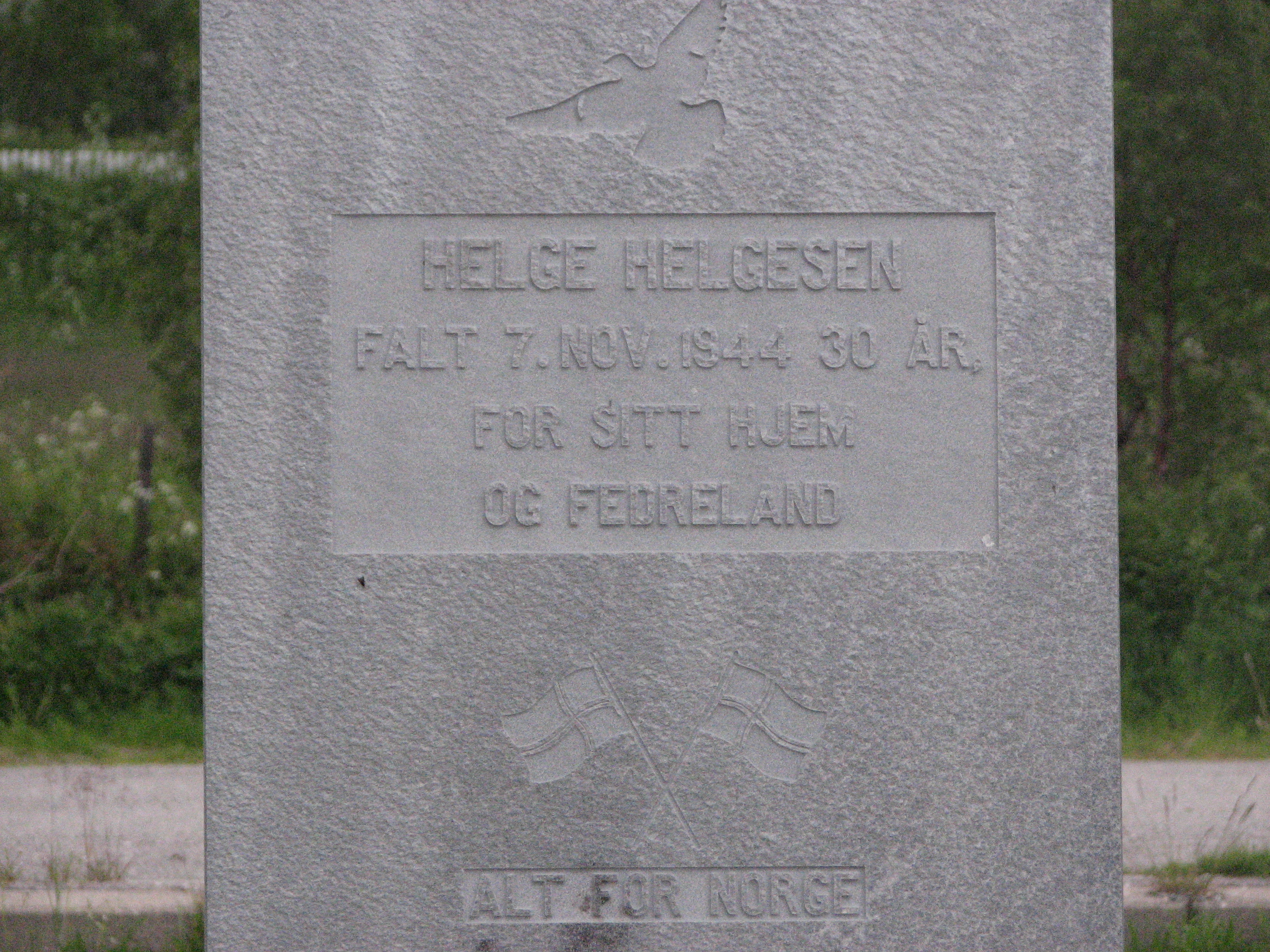

== See also ==
- List of churches in Nord-Hålogaland
