= Måsøya =

Island in Norway

Måsøya (Norwegian); Muosáidsuolu (Northern Sami)
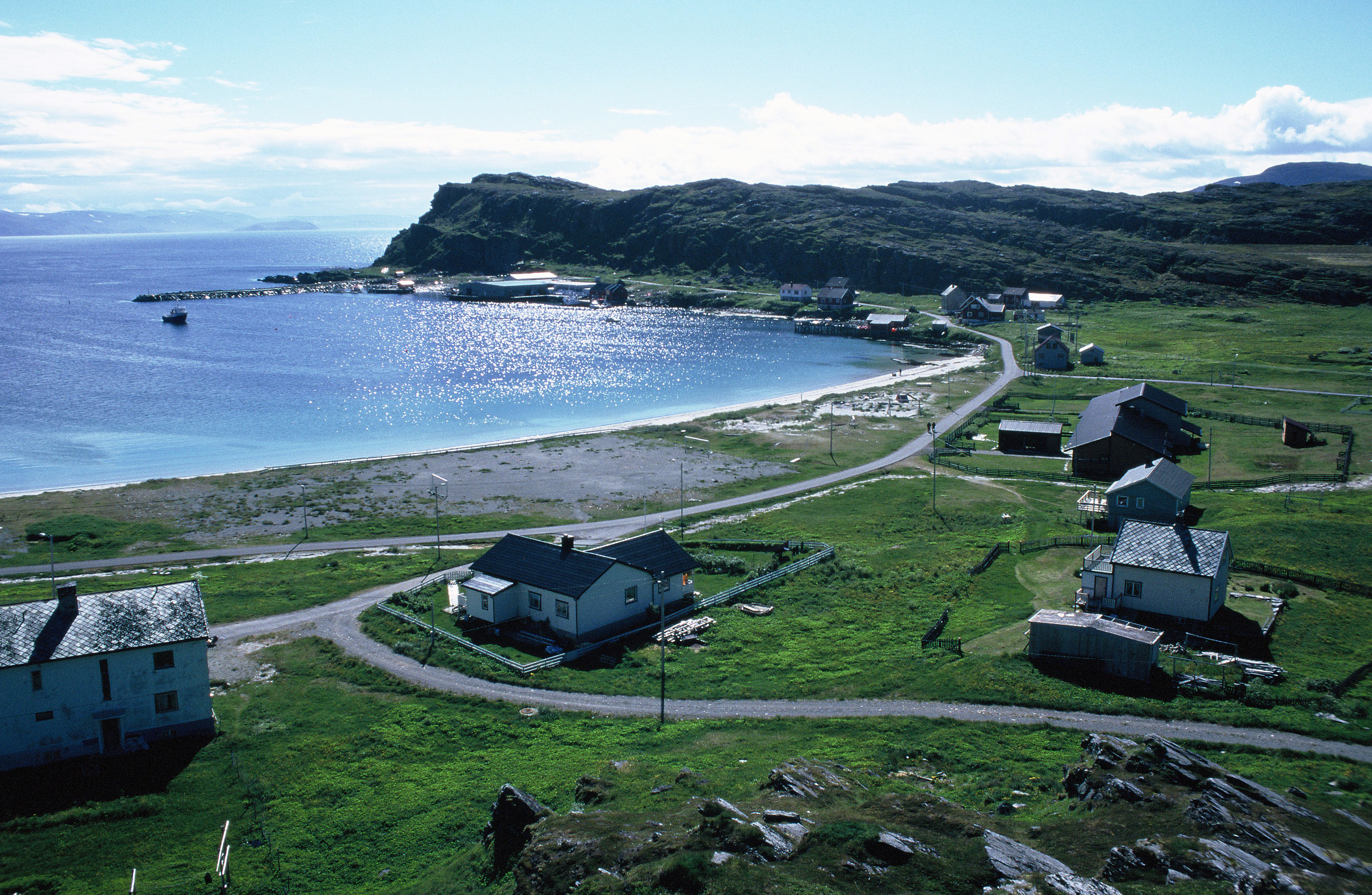
- View of the village of Måsøy
- Interactive map of: Måsøya (Norwegian); Muosáidsuolu (Northern Sami)

Geography
- Location: Finnmark, Norway
- Coordinates: 71.0221°N 24.9791°E
- Area: 13.45 km^{2} (5.19 sq mi)
- Length: 6 km (3.7 mi)
- Width: 4.5 km (2.8 mi)
- Highest elevation: 290 m (950 ft)
- Highest point: Hollendaren

Administration
- Norway
- County: Finnmark
- Municipality: Måsøy Municipality

Måsøya (Norwegian) or Muosáidsuolu (Northern Sami) is an island in Måsøy Municipality in Finnmark county, Norway. The 13.45-square-kilometre (5.19 sq mi) island is located west of the large island of Magerøya and to the east of the islands of Hjelmsøya and Havøya. The Porsanger Peninsula on the mainland lies south of the island. The island is only accessible by boat, and there is regular ferry service from Havøysund. The population of the island (2026) is about 24 people.

The only settlement on the island is the small fishing village of Måsøy. It is located on the southern part of the island on an isthmus between two small fjords. Historically, the village was the administrative centre of the municipality and it is where Måsøy Church is located. There is a herd of about 40 reindeer that live on the island.

The notable Norwegian minister and poet Magnus Brostrup Landstad was born here.

== See also ==
- List of islands of Norway
