= Langnes, Finnmark =

Village in Alta Municipality, Norway

Langnes Langnes (Norwegian) Uhca Lákkonjárggaš (Northern Sami)
- Village
- Interactive map of Langnes
- Location within Finnmark Location within Norway
- Coordinates: 70.10674°N 22.99813°E
- Country: Norway
- Region: Northern Norway
- County: Finnmark
- District: Vest-Finnmark
- Municipality: Alta Municipality
- Elevation: 5 m (16 ft)
- Time zone: UTC+01:00 (CET)
  - Summer (DST): UTC+02:00 (CEST)
- Post Code: 9540 Talvik

Langnes (Norwegian) or Uhca Lákkonjárggaš (Northern Sami) is a village in Alta Municipality in Finnmark county, Norway. The village is located along the west shore of the Altafjorden, about 8 kilometres (5.0 mi) north of the village of Talvik. The European route E6 highway runs through the village before entering the Algas Tunnel which heads west from the village through the mountain Algas.
