= Talvik, Norway =

Village in Alta Municipality, Norway

Talvik (Norwegian); Dálbmeluovta (Northern Sami); Talmulahti (Kven)
- Village
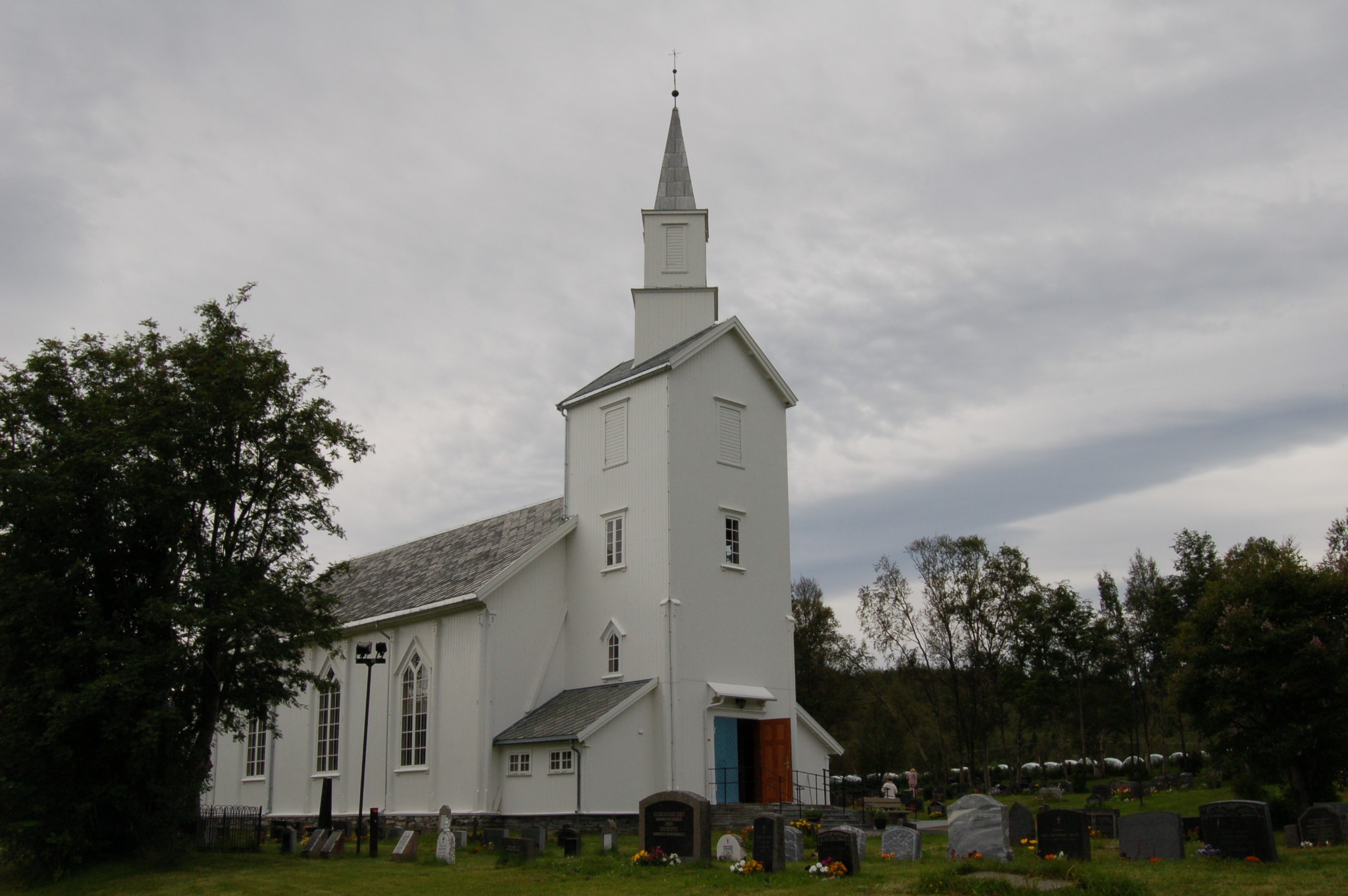
- View of the village church
- Interactive map of: Talvik (Norwegian); Dálbmeluovta (Northern Sami); Talmulahti (Kven)
- Location within Finnmark Location within Norway
- Coordinates: 70.0425°N 22.9499°E
- Country: Norway
- Region: Northern Norway
- County: Finnmark
- District: Vest-Finnmark
- Municipality: Alta Municipality

Area
  - Total: 0.37 km^{2} (0.14 sq mi)
- Elevation: 8 m (26 ft)

Population (2023)
  - Total: 291
  - Density: 786/km^{2} (2,040/sq mi)
- Time zone: UTC+01:00 (CET)
  - Summer (DST): UTC+02:00 (CEST)
- Post Code: 9540 Talvik

Talvik (Norwegian), Dálbmeluovta (Northern Sami), or Talmulahti (Kven) is a village in Alta Municipality in Finnmark county in Norway. It is located on the western shore of the Altafjorden, along the European route E6 highway. The 0.37-square-kilometre (91-acre) village has a population (2023) of 291 and a population density of 786 inhabitants per square kilometre (2,040/sq mi).

== History ==
The village is an old Norwegian trading centre since the 1600s. Talvik Church is located in the village. The village of Talvik was the administrative centre of the old municipality of Talvik from 1863 until 1964 when it was merged into Alta municipality.

=== Name ===
The village is named after the old Talvik farm since the first Talvik Church was built there. The first element of the name is rather uncertain. If the first element was of Old Norse origin then it is derived from the word Þelli which means "pine" (due to the large number of pine trees in the area). The other explanation is that it is a corruption of the Northern Sami word Dálbme or the longer name Dálbmeluokta (historic spelling) which translates as "fog" or "fog bay". The early Norwegian settlers would have translated that as tåkebukta (meaning "fog bay") and this could have been corrupted from tåke to tal. The last element of the name is vík which means "inlet" or "cove". Historically, the name was spelled Talvig using the old Danish spelling, and later it was "Norwegianized" to Talvik.

== Media gallery ==
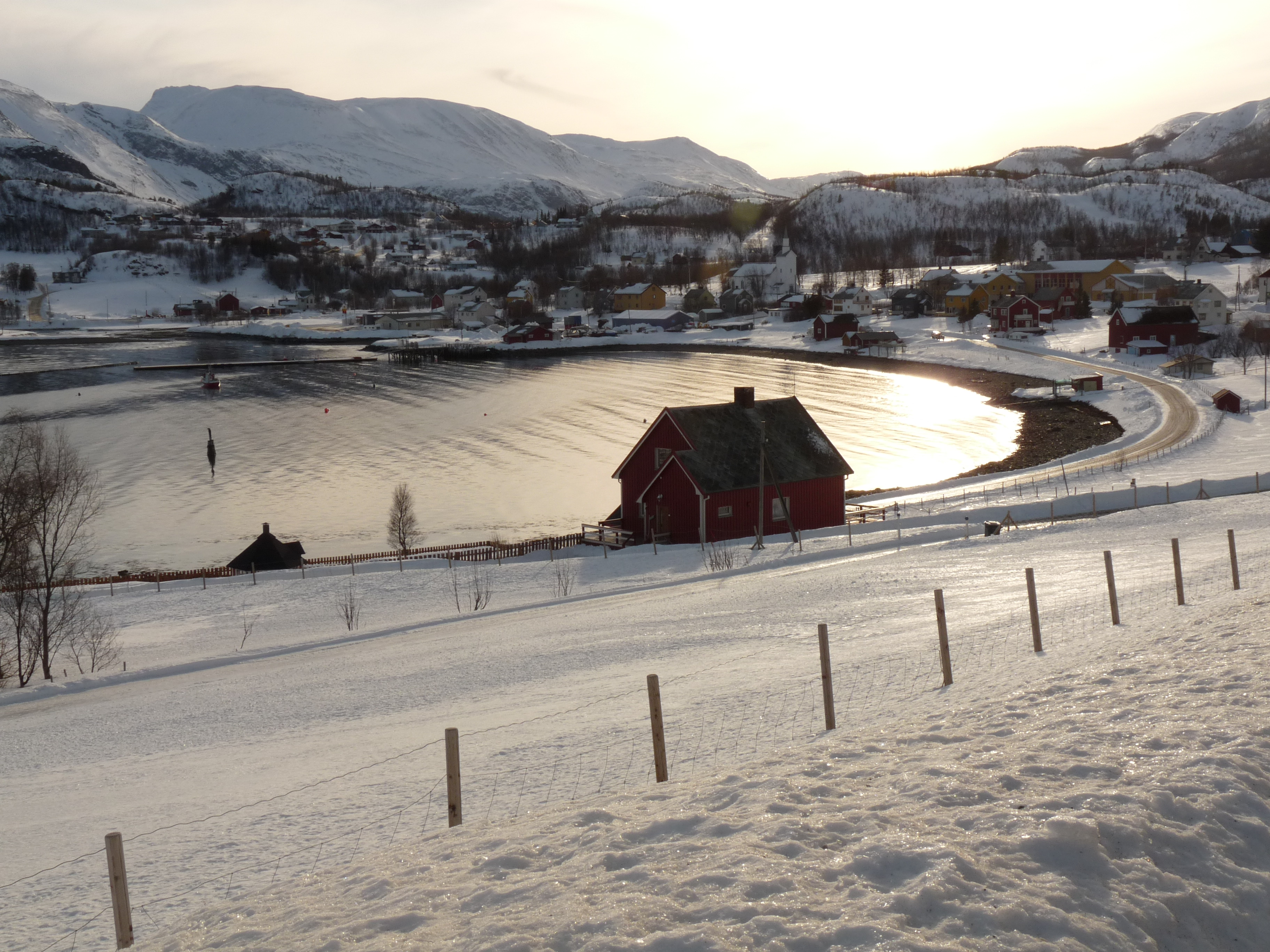
Winter view of the village

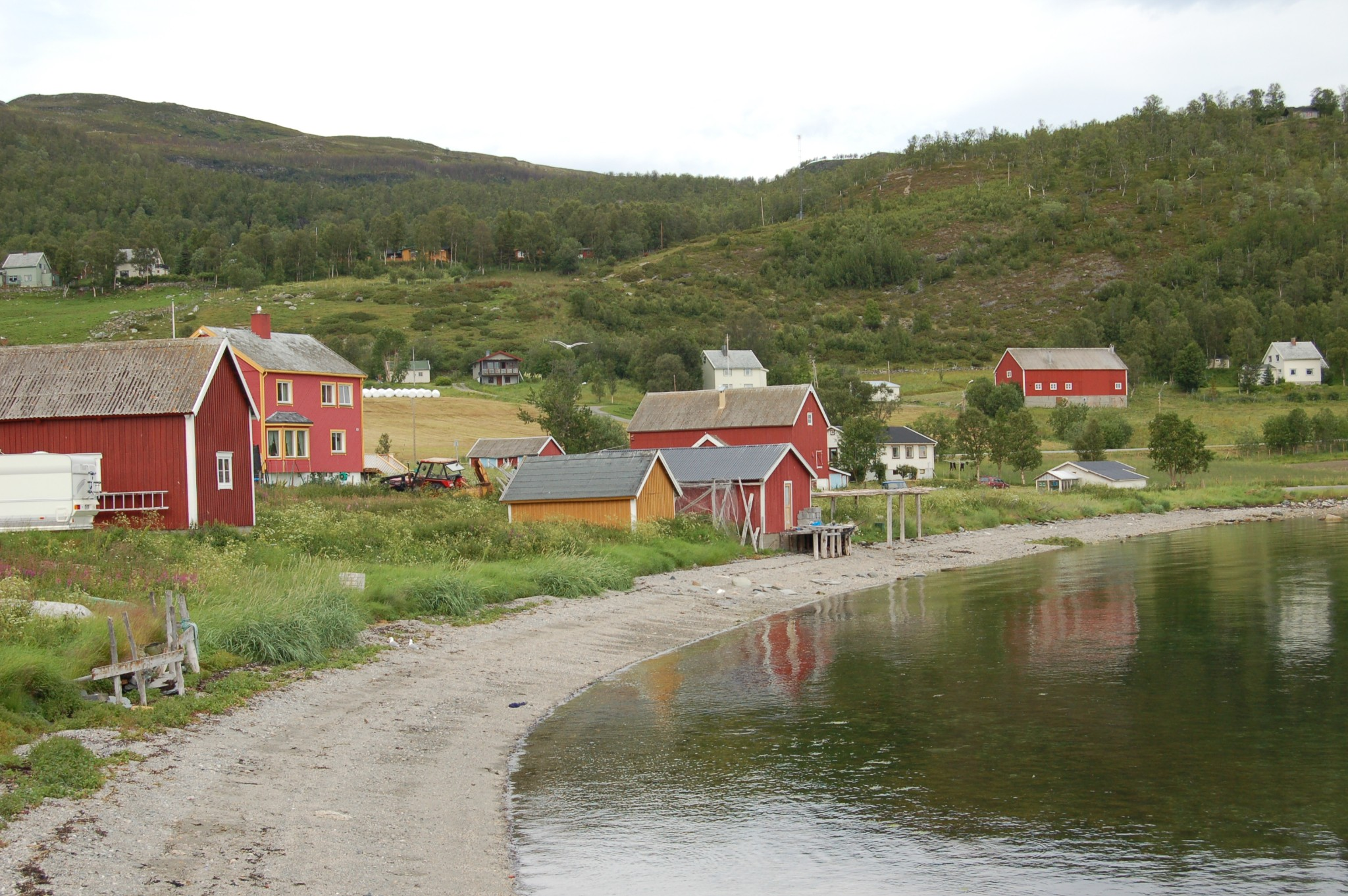
View of the village in 2006

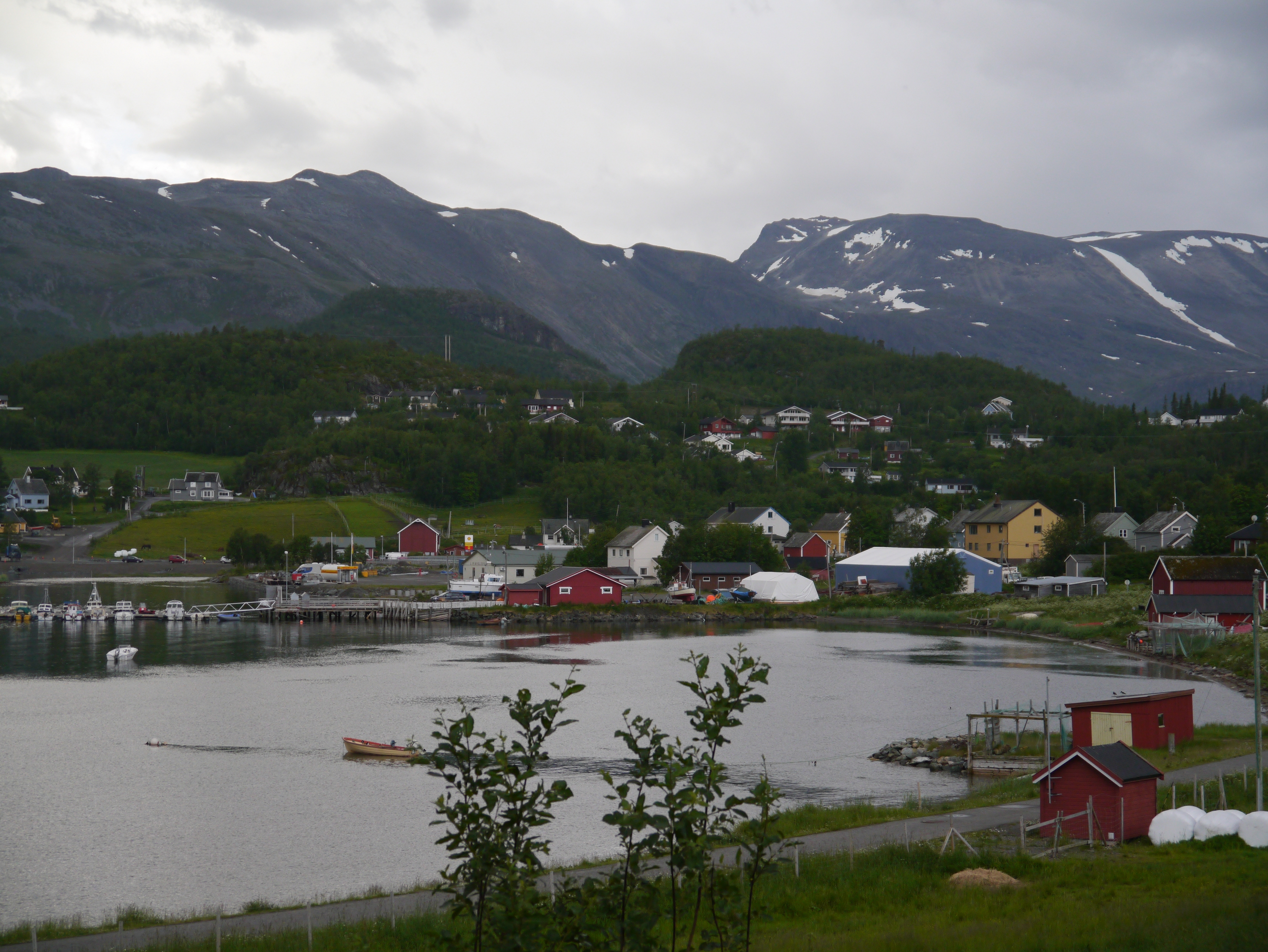
Summer view of the harbor

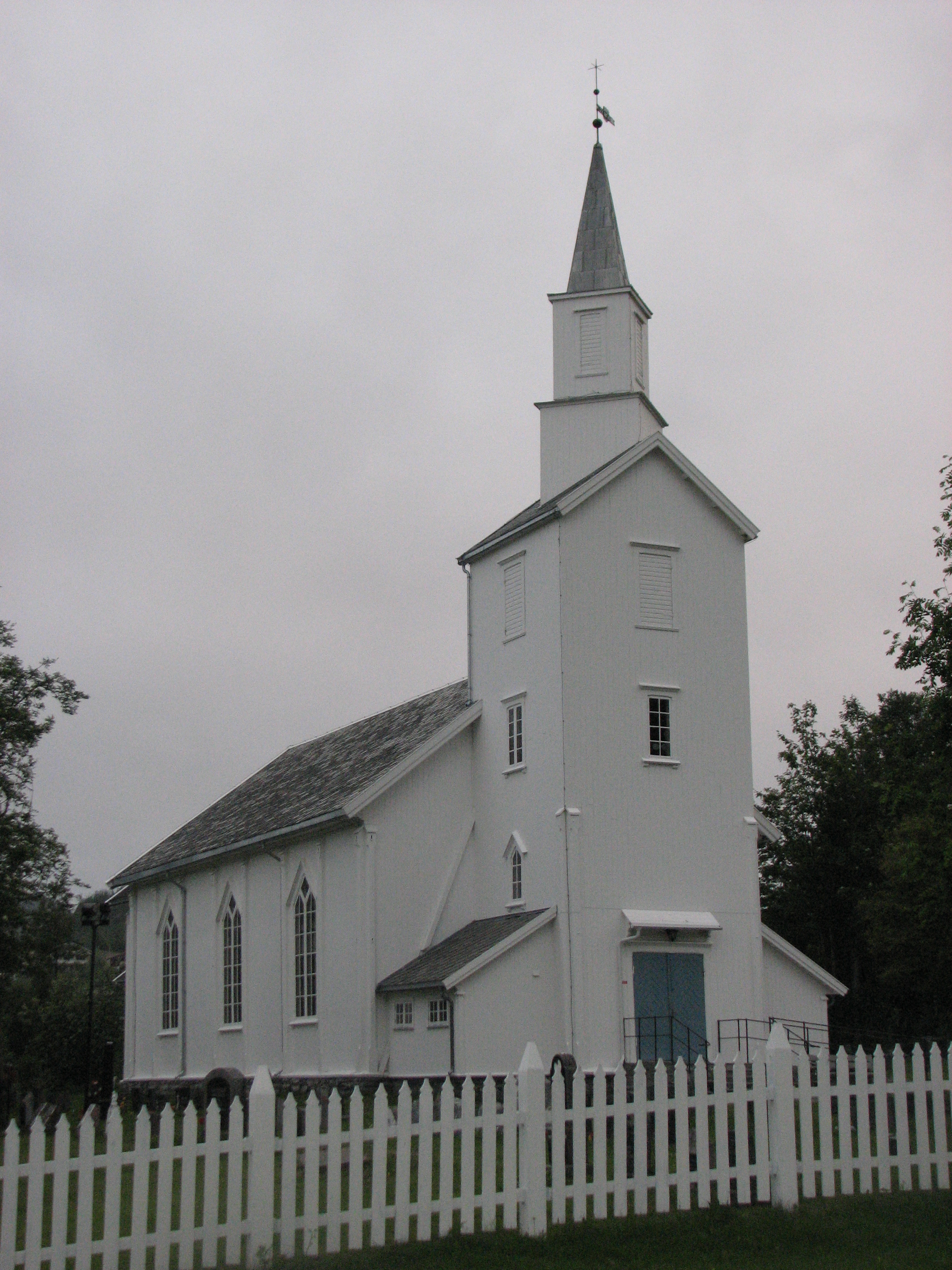
View of the local church
