= Store Måsvannet =

Lake in Lebesby municipality, Norway

Store Måsvannet (Norwegian); Stuorra Sopmir (Northern Sami)
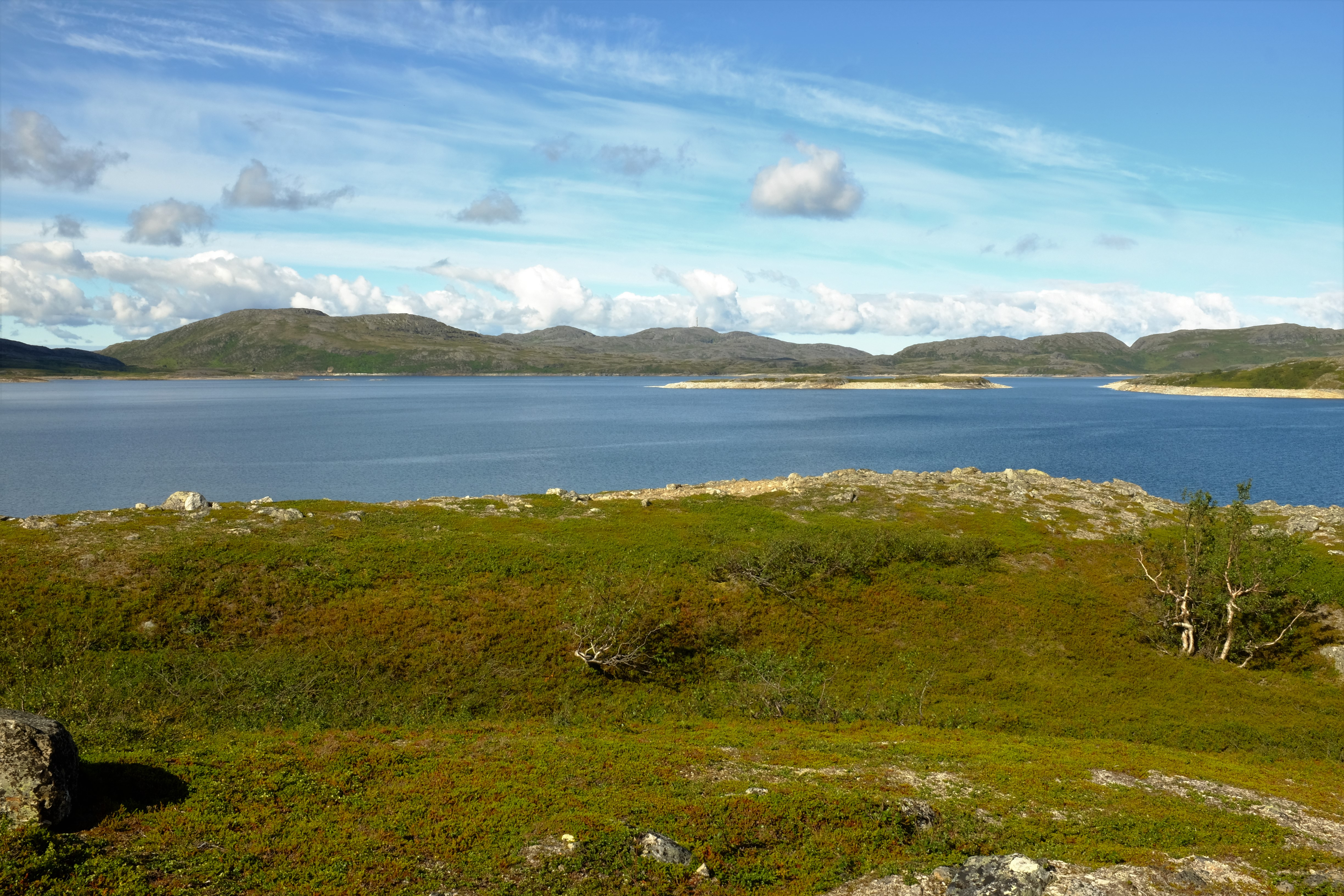
- Store Måsvannet
- Interactive map of the lake
- Location: Finnmark
- Coordinates: 70.3823°N 26.8807°E
- Basin countries: Norway
- Max. length: 6.2 kilometres (3.9 mi)
- Max. width: 5 kilometres (3.1 mi)
- Surface area: 14.9 km^{2} (5.8 sq mi)
- Shore length^{1}: 29.1 kilometres (18.1 mi)
- Surface elevation: 213 metres (699 ft)
- References: NVE
- ^{1} Shore length is not a well-defined measure.

Store Måsvannet (Norwegian) or Stuorra Sopmir (Northern Sami) is a lake in Lebesby Municipality in Finnmark county, Norway. The 14.89-square-kilometre (5.75 sq mi) lake lies about 4 kilometres (2.5 mi) southeast of the Laksefjorden, about half-way between Kunes and Ifjord.

== See also ==
- List of lakes in Norway
