= Suolojávri =

Suolojávri may refer to the following locations:

- Guolehis Suolojávri, a lake in Kautokeino municipality, Finnmark, Norway
- Suolojávri (Kautokeino), a lake in Kautokeino municipality, Finnmark, Norway
- Suolojávri (Lebesby), a lake in Lebesby municipality, Finnmark, Norway
- Suolojávri (Narvik), a lake in Narvik municipality, Nordland, Norway
