= Kjøllefjord Airport =

Airport in Lebesby, Finnmark, Norway

Kjøllefjord Airport Kjøllefjord flystripe
- IATA: none; ICAO: none

Summary
- Airport type: General aviation
- Serves: Kjøllefjord
- Location: Kjøllefjord, Lebesby, Norway
- Coordinates: 70°56′26″N 027°20′57″E
- Website: Official site

Map
- Location in Norway

Runways
Direction	Length		Surface
Direction	m	ft	Surface
	630	2,070	Gravel

Kjøllefjord Airfield (Norwegian: Kjøllefjord flyplass) is a disused general aviation airport (airfield) located at Kjøllefjord in Lebesby Municipality in Finnmark county, Norway. It consisted of a 630-by-40-meter (2,070 by 130 ft) gravel runway and a simple small building as a terminal. Plans for an airport in Kjøllefjord were first launched in the mid-1960s. The Norving airline was the main proponent as they intended to operate an air taxi and air ambulance service. Construction started in 1973 and the airport opened in 1974. In that same year, another nearby airport opened; the larger Mehamn Airport is only 30 kilometers away and Kjøllefjord therefore was little used. It was abandoned in the 1980s.

== History ==
The first official proposals for an airport at Kjøllefjord were launched by a Finnmark County Municipality-appointed committee which in published a report in 1966. It recommended that six regional airport be built in Finnmark, including both Mehamn and Kjøllefjord. As Finnmark had lowest priority on the state-financed construction of regional airports, Norving took initiative to start construction of smaller and simpler airfields in select communities, including Kjøllefjord. The airline therefore contacted the municipality in December 1969 and proposed that an airfield be built within a year, which it could operate with its Britten-Norman Islander aircraft. The airline also looked into two other locations on Nordkinnhalvøya, Mehamn and Gamvik. When the Civil Aviation Administration started planning an airport for the area, it considered both Kjøllefjord, Mehamn and Gamvik as locations for the regional airport, deciding in the end to build at Mehamn.

Planning of the airport was started by A/L Kjøllefjord Flyplass in early 1973. Its first main task was to raise funding. In addition to donations from the community, Lebesby Municipality gave a NOK 1-million grant. Construction started in the summer of 1973, but an early winter forced completion to be delayed until early 1974. The airport opened the same year as the regional Mehamn Airport, located 30 kilometers (19 mi) away. The construction of Mehamn Airport included upgrading the road from Mehamn to Kjøllefjord and Gamvik to all-year standards. The airfield was occasionally used for ambulance flights, although this was normally only done when Mehamn Airport was closed because of fog.

The airport received permission in 1978 to operate public flights. Norving applied for permission to operate taxi route flights, but this was rejected by the Ministry of Transport and Communications because it would drain part of the catchment area of Mehamn Airport. Kjøllefjord Airport became disused during the 1980s, although both the runway and terminal remain, in a dilapidated state. For a while it was used as a storage area during construction of a windmill park.

== Facilities ==
The airport had a 630-by-40-meter (2,070 by 130 ft) gravel runway. A simple shed was used as a terminal, which included waiting areas for passengers and radio equipment.
