= Oksfjorden =

Oksfjorden or Øksfjorden or Øksfjord may refer to:

== Places ==
- Øksfjord, a village in Loppa Municipality in Finnmark county, Norway
- Oksfjorden (Finnmark), a fjord in Lebesby Municipality in Finnmark county, Norway
- Oksfjorden (Troms), a fjord in Nordreisa Municipality in Troms county, Norway
- Øksfjorden (Finnmark), a fjord in Loppa Municipality in Finnmark county, Norway
- Øksfjorden (Nordland), a fjord in Lødingen Municipality in Nordland county, Norway

== See also ==
- Oksefjorden (disambiguation)
