= Lebesby (village) =

Village in Lebesby, Norway

Lebesby: Lebesby (Norwegian); Davvesiida (Northern Sami)
- Village
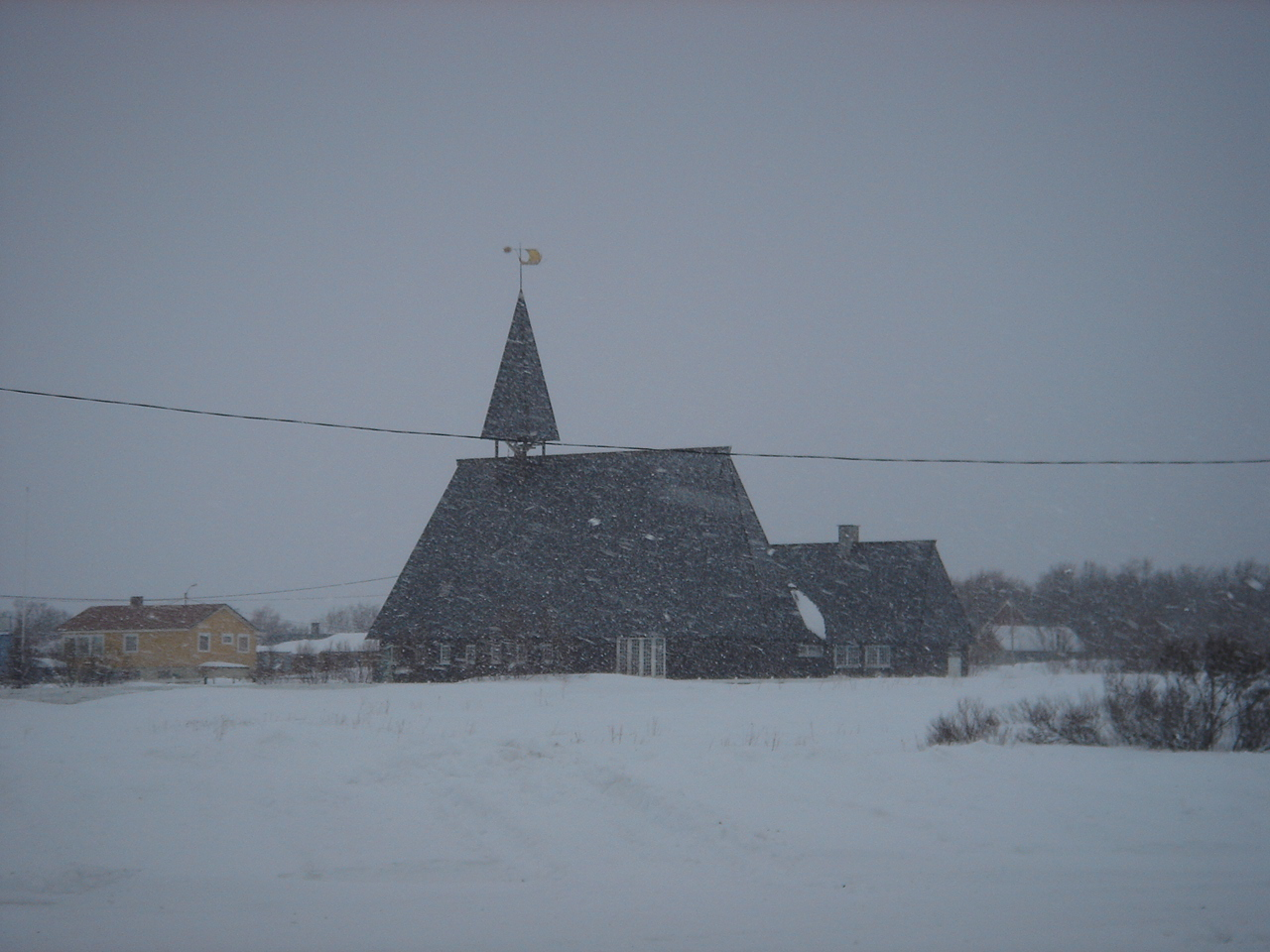
- View of the village and church
- Interactive map of Lebesby
- Location within Finnmark Location within Norway
- Coordinates: 70°34′22″N 27°00′07″E
- Country: Norway
- Region: Northern Norway
- County: Finnmark
- District: Øst-Finnmark
- Municipality: Lebesby Municipality
- Elevation: 5 m (16 ft)
- Time zone: UTC+01:00 (CET)
  - Summer (DST): UTC+02:00 (CEST)
- Post Code: 9740 Lebesby

Lebesby (Norwegian) or Davvesiida (Northern Sami) is a village in Lebesby Municipality in Finnmark county, Norway. The village is located on the shore of the Laksefjorden, along Norwegian County Road 888. The population was 85 in 2015. The village is about half-way between the villages of Ifjord and Bekkarfjord, about 50 kilometres (31 mi) south of the municipal centre of Kjøllefjord. Lebesby Church is located in the center of the village.
