= Ifjord =

Village in Lebesby, Norway

Ifjord: Ifjord (Norwegian); Idjavuotna (Northern Sami)
- Village
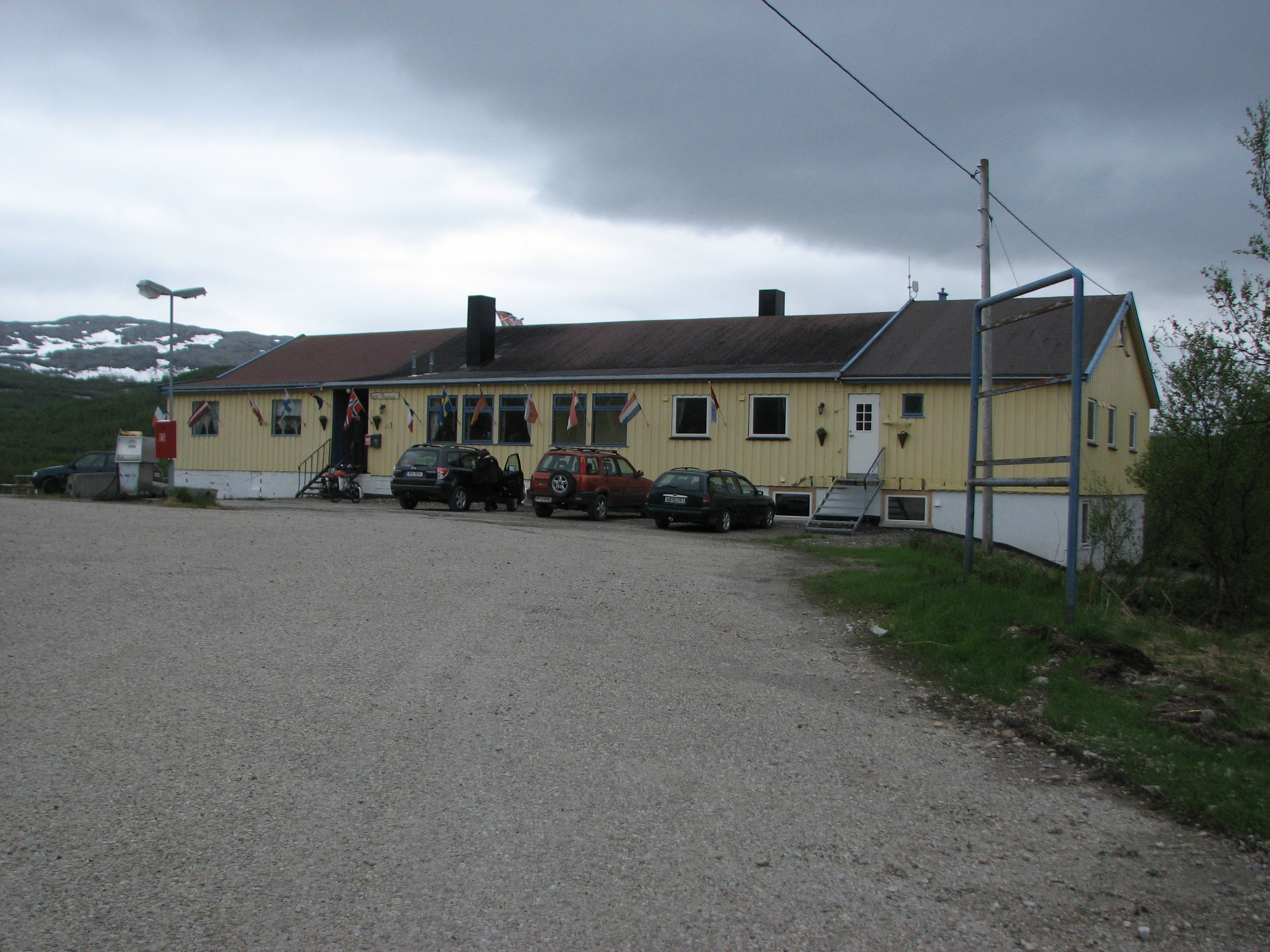
- View of the village
- Interactive map of Ifjord
- Location within Finnmark Location within Norway
- Coordinates: 70.46269°N 27.10611°E
- Country: Norway
- Region: Northern Norway
- County: Finnmark
- District: Øst-Finnmark
- Municipality: Lebesby Municipality
- Elevation: 8 m (26 ft)
- Time zone: UTC+01:00 (CET)
  - Summer (DST): UTC+02:00 (CEST)
- Post Code: 9740 Lebesby

Ifjord (Norwegian) or Idjavuotna (Northern Sami) is a village in Lebesby Municipality in Finnmark county, Norway. It is located at the bottom of Ifjorden, a branch of Laksefjorden. The village lies about 15 kilometres (9.3 mi) to the southeast of the village of Lebesby and about 30 kilometres (19 mi) to the northeast of the village of Kunes.
