= Oksefjorden =

Oksefjorden may refer to:

== Places ==
- Oksefjorden (Agder), a fjord in Tvedestrand and Arendal municipalities in Agder county, Norway
- Oksefjorden (Finnmark), a fjord in Lebesby municipality in Finnmark county, Norway
- Oksefjorden, also known as the Rivenesfjorden, a fjord in Kristiansand municipality in Agder county, Norway

== See also ==
- Oksfjorden (disambiguation)
