= Lebesby Municipality =

Municipality in Finnmark, Norway

Lebesby Municipality Lebesby kommune Davvesiidda gielda (Northern Sami) Lebespyyn komuuni (Kven)
- Municipality
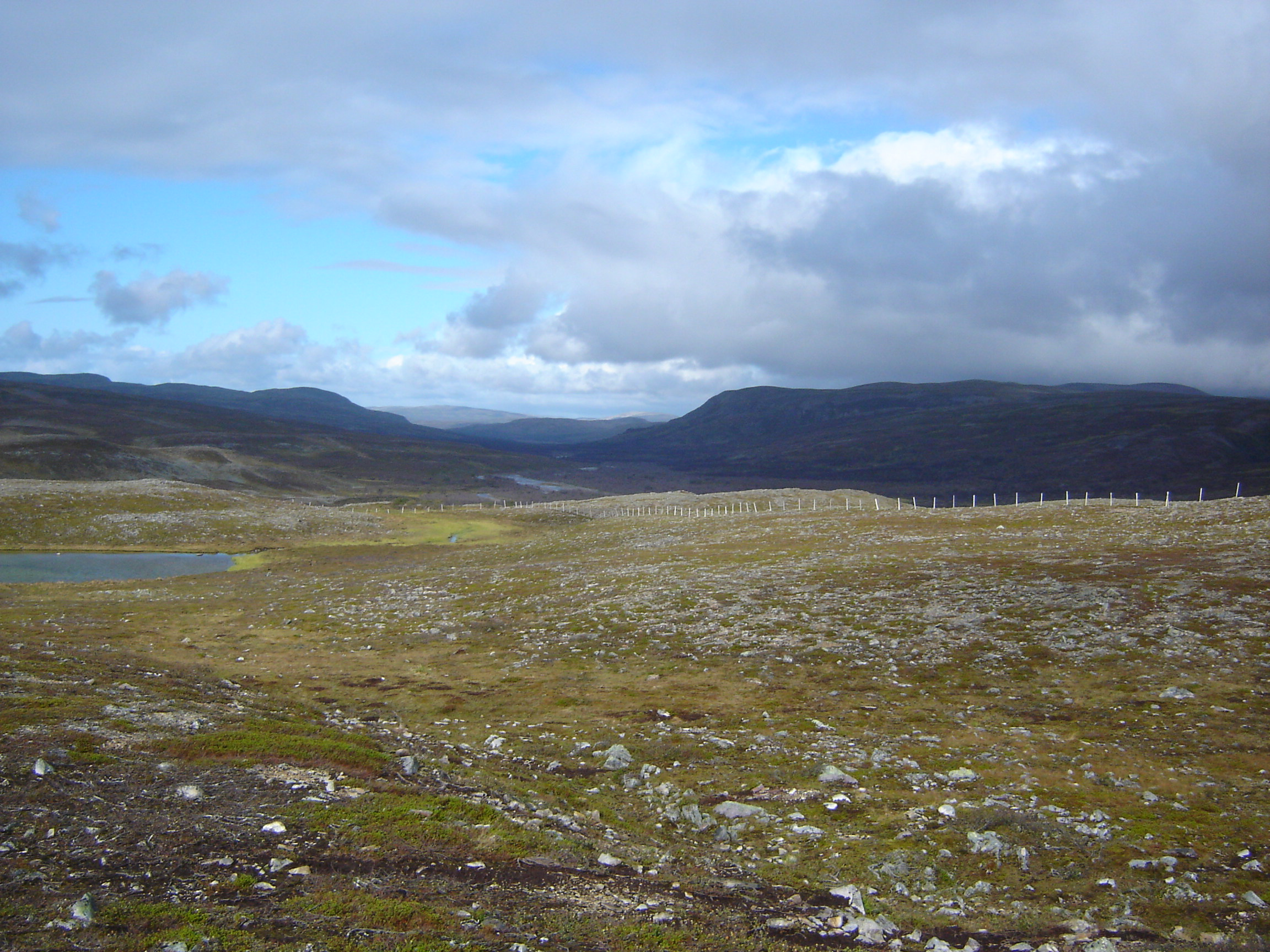
- View of the Ifjordfjellet in Lebesby

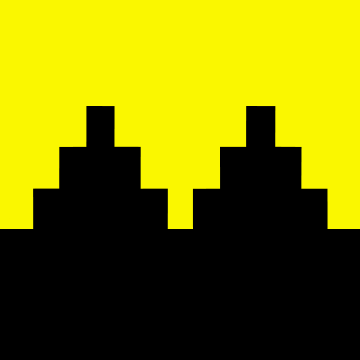
- Flag Coat of arms

- Finnmark within Norway

- Lebesby within Finnmark
- Coordinates: 70°56′43″N 27°21′04″E
- Country: Norway
- County: Finnmark
- District: Øst-Finnmark
- Established: 1 Jan 1838
  - Created as: Formannskapsdistrikt
- Administrative centre: Kjøllefjord

Government
  - Mayor (2019): Sigurd Rafaelsen (Ap)

Area
  - Total: 3,460.50 km^{2} (1,336.11 sq mi)
  - Land: 3,230.88 km^{2} (1,247.45 sq mi)
  - Water: 229.62 km^{2} (88.66 sq mi) 6.6%
  - Rank: #8 in Norway
- Highest elevation: 1,066.8 m (3,500 ft)

Population (2024)
  - Total: 1,215
  - Rank: #320 in Norway
  - Density: 0.4/km^{2} (1.0/sq mi)
  - Change (10 years): ▼ −9.4%
- Demonym: Lebesbyværing

Official language
  - Norwegian form: Bokmål
- Time zone: UTC+01:00 (CET)
  - Summer (DST): UTC+02:00 (CEST)
- ISO 3166 code: NO-5624
- Website: Official website

Lebesby (Northern Sami: Davvesiida and Kven: Lebespyy) is a municipality in Finnmark county, Norway. The administrative centre of the municipality is the village of Kjøllefjord. Other villages in the municipality include Ifjord, Kunes, Lebesby, and Veidnes.

The 3,460.5-square-kilometre (1,336.1 sq mi) municipality is the 8th largest by area out of the 357 municipalities in Norway. Lebesby is the 320th most populous municipality in Norway with a population of 1,215. The municipality's population density is 0.4 inhabitants per square kilometre (1.0/sq mi) and its population has decreased by 9.4% over the previous 10-year period.

The municipality consists of the western half of the Nordkinn Peninsula, along with areas around the Laksefjorden. Most people live in the village of Kjøllefjord. This municipality is dominated by ethnic Norwegians, whereas the areas around the Laksefjorden are predominantly Sami. Fishing is the mainstay of the population.

== Economy ==
There are 17 wind turbines that generate electrical power in Kjøllefjord, as of 2024. The world's northernmost dairy farm that produces milk (Norwegian: melkebruk) is located in Bekkarfjord.

== History ==
The parish of Lebesby was established as a municipality on 1 January 1838 (see formannskapsdistrikt law). In 1864, the eastern part of Lebesby that surrounds the Tanafjorden (population: 1,388) was separated to become the new Tana Municipality. Tana was later separated into three: Tana Municipality, Gamvik Municipality, and Berlevåg Municipality. The borders of Lebesby have remained unchanged since that time.

On 1 January 2020, the municipality became part of the newly formed Troms og Finnmark county. Previously, it had been part of the old Finnmark county. On 1 January 2024, the Troms og Finnmark county was divided and the municipality once again became part of Finnmark county.

=== Name ===
The origins of the municipal name are uncertain. There are two main possibilities. Lebesby may be a Norwegianized form of a Northern Sami name Leaibbessiida. The first element is the genitive form of the word leaibi which means "grey alder". The last element is siida which means "reindeer camp" or "dwelling place". A second option for the origin of the name is that Lebesby is a corruption of the Old Norse word Liðvarðsbýr. The first element is Liðvarð which is a male name from long ago. The last element is býr which means "dwelling place" or "farmstead".

=== Coat of arms ===
The coat of arms was granted on 22 July 1988. The official blazon is "Per fess embattled grady with three steps and two peaks Or and Sable" (Norwegian: Delt av gult og svart ved tredobbelt tindesnitt med to tinder). This means the arms have a field (background) that is divided by a line that is "embattled grady". A line embattled grady consists of series of two or three steps, as if each merlon has a smaller merlon atop it. The field below the line has a tincture of sable and the field above the line has a tincture of Or which means it is commonly colored yellow, but if it is made out of metal, then gold is used. The idea is that the arms represent the Finnkirka ("the Finn Church"), a cliff by the sea in the municipality. This cliff formation has the appearance of a church, and in former times was used by Sami people as a place of sacrifice. The arms were designed by Arvid Sveen.

== Geography ==
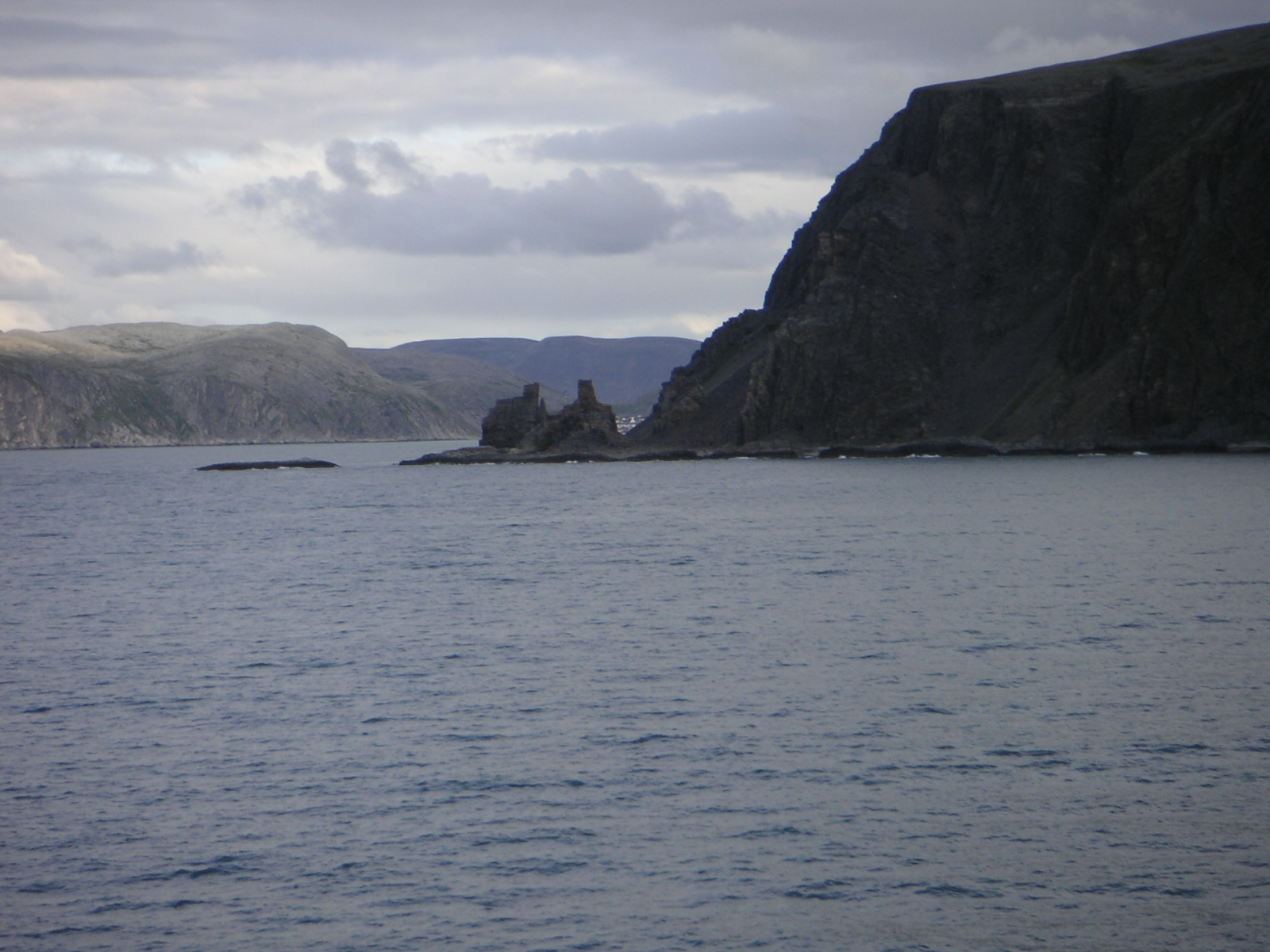
View of the Finnkirka mountain

The municipality consists of the areas around the Laksefjorden, including the eastern part of the Sværholt Peninsula and the western half of the Nordkinn Peninsula. At the entrance to the Kjøllefjorden at the northwestern tip of the Nordkinn Peninsula, one finds the spectacular Finnkirka sea cliff, so named because of its soaring spires that look like a church. On the other side of the Oksefjorden on the northern end of the peninsula, the Kinnarodden cape (shared with Gamvik Municipality) is the northernmost point on the European mainland. There are several large lakes in the municipality including Kjæsvannet, Store Måsvannet, and Suolojávri. The highest point in the municipality is the 1,066.78-metre (3,499.9 ft) tall mountain Rásttigáisá.

=== Birdlife ===
The same seacliffs mentioned above hold large numbers of breeding seabirds. In fact Norway's third largest seabird colony can be found in the municipality. Experiencing a seabird colony is one of nature's great experiences, here you can see and listen to thousands of birds with such species as fulmar and Atlantic puffin being a part of a fascinating ecosystem.

=== Flora ===
The world's northernmost birch forest is located in this municipality, near Oksefjorden, 9 kilometres (5.6 mi) east of Kjøllefjord (70°58′N 27°34′E).

=== Climate ===
Climate data for Lebesby
Month	Jan	Feb	Mar	Apr	May	Jun	Jul	Aug	Sep	Oct	Nov	Dec	Year
Daily mean °C (°F)	−6.8 (19.8)	−6.6 (20.1)	−4.5 (23.9)	−1.1 (30.0)	3.5 (38.3)	8.0 (46.4)	11.0 (51.8)	10.2 (50.4)	6.5 (43.7)	1.7 (35.1)	−2.3 (27.9)	−5.5 (22.1)	1.2 (34.2)
Average precipitation mm (inches)	44 (1.7)	36 (1.4)	30 (1.2)	29 (1.1)	28 (1.1)	38 (1.5)	57 (2.2)	54 (2.1)	58 (2.3)	59 (2.3)	45 (1.8)	42 (1.7)	520 (20.5)
Source: Norwegian Meteorological Institute

== Government ==
Lebesby Municipality is responsible for primary education (through 10th grade), outpatient health services, senior citizen services, welfare and other social services, zoning, economic development, and municipal roads and utilities. The municipality is governed by a municipal council of directly elected representatives. The mayor is indirectly elected by a vote of the municipal council. The municipality is under the jurisdiction of the Indre og Østre Finnmark District Court and the Hålogaland Court of Appeal.

=== Municipal council ===
The municipal council (Kommunestyre) of Lebesby Municipality is made up of 17 representatives that are elected to four year terms. The tables below show the current and historical composition of the council by political party.

Lebesby kommunestyre 2023–2027
Party name (in Norwegian)	Number of representatives
Labour Party (Arbeiderpartiet)	10
Conservative Party (Høyre)	3
Centre Party (Senterpartiet)	2
Socialist Left Party (Sosialistisk Venstreparti)	2
Total number of members:	17

Lebesby kommunestyre 2019–2023
Party name (in Norwegian)	Number of representatives
Labour Party (Arbeiderpartiet)	8
Conservative Party (Høyre)	1
Centre Party (Senterpartiet)	4
Socialist Left Party (Sosialistisk Venstreparti)	2
Lebesby Cross-Party List (Lebesby Tverrpolitiske liste)	2
Total number of members:	17

Lebesby kommunestyre 2015–2019
Party name (in Norwegian)	Number of representatives
Labour Party (Arbeiderpartiet)	8
Green Party (Miljøpartiet De Grønne)	2
Conservative Party (Høyre)	1
Socialist Left Party (Sosialistisk Venstreparti)	1
Lebesby Cross-Party List (Lebesby Tverrpolitiske liste)	5
Total number of members:	17

Lebesby kommunestyre 2011–2015
Party name (in Norwegian)	Number of representatives
Labour Party (Arbeiderpartiet)	11
Non-Socialist Common List (Borgerlig Fellesliste)	6
Total number of members:	17

Lebesby kommunestyre 2007–2011
Party name (in Norwegian)	Number of representatives
Labour Party (Arbeiderpartiet)	11
Conservative Party (Høyre)	2
Centre Party (Senterpartiet)	2
Socialist Left Party (Sosialistisk Venstreparti)	2
Total number of members:	17

Lebesby kommunestyre 2003–2007
Party name (in Norwegian)	Number of representatives
Labour Party (Arbeiderpartiet)	8
Conservative Party (Høyre)	3
Centre Party (Senterpartiet)	2
Socialist Left Party (Sosialistisk Venstreparti)	4
Total number of members:	17

Lebesby kommunestyre 1999–2003
Party name (in Norwegian)	Number of representatives
Labour Party (Arbeiderpartiet)	9
Conservative Party (Høyre)	4
Coastal Party (Kystpartiet)	2
Socialist Left Party (Sosialistisk Venstreparti)	2
Total number of members:	17

Lebesby kommunestyre 1995–1999
Party name (in Norwegian)	Number of representatives
Labour Party (Arbeiderpartiet)	10
Conservative Party (Høyre)	5
Socialist Left Party (Sosialistisk Venstreparti)	5
Dyfjord Village List (Dyfjord Bygdeliste)	1
Total number of members:	21

Lebesby kommunestyre 1991–1995
Party name (in Norwegian)	Number of representatives
Labour Party (Arbeiderpartiet)	11
Conservative Party (Høyre)	5
Socialist Left Party (Sosialistisk Venstreparti)	5
Total number of members:	21

Lebesby kommunestyre 1987–1991
Party name (in Norwegian)	Number of representatives
Labour Party (Arbeiderpartiet)	13
Conservative Party (Høyre)	3
Christian Democratic Party (Kristelig Folkeparti)	2
Socialist Left Party (Sosialistisk Venstreparti)	3
Total number of members:	21

Lebesby kommunestyre 1985–1987
Party name (in Norwegian)	Number of representatives
Labour Party (Arbeiderpartiet)	14
Conservative Party (Høyre)	3
Christian Democratic Party (Kristelig Folkeparti)	1
Centre Party (Senterpartiet)	1
Socialist Left Party (Sosialistisk Venstreparti)	2
Total number of members:	21

Lebesby kommunestyre 1979–1983
Party name (in Norwegian)	Number of representatives
Labour Party (Arbeiderpartiet)	12
Conservative Party (Høyre)	5
Christian Democratic Party (Kristelig Folkeparti)	2
Centre Party (Senterpartiet)	1
Joint list of the Socialist Left Party (Sosialistisk Venstreparti) and the Communist Party (Kommunistiske Parti)	1
Total number of members:	21

Lebesby kommunestyre 1975–1979
Party name (in Norwegian)	Number of representatives
Labour Party (Arbeiderpartiet)	13
Conservative Party (Høyre)	3
Christian Democratic Party (Kristelig Folkeparti)	2
Socialist Left Party (Sosialistisk Venstreparti)	2
Local List(s) (Lokale lister)	1
Total number of members:	21

Lebesby kommunestyre 1971–1975
Party name (in Norwegian)	Number of representatives
Labour Party (Arbeiderpartiet)	17
Conservative Party (Høyre)	4
Total number of members:	21

Lebesby kommunestyre 1967–1971
Party name (in Norwegian)	Number of representatives
Labour Party (Arbeiderpartiet)	14
Conservative Party (Høyre)	3
List of workers, fishermen, and small farmholders (Arbeidere, fiskere, småbrukere liste)	4
Total number of members:	21

Lebesby kommunestyre 1963–1967
Party name (in Norwegian)	Number of representatives
Labour Party (Arbeiderpartiet)	16
Conservative Party (Høyre)	2
List of workers, fishermen, and small farmholders (Arbeidere, fiskere, småbrukere liste)	3
Total number of members:	21

Lebesby herredsstyre 1959–1963
Party name (in Norwegian)	Number of representatives
Labour Party (Arbeiderpartiet)	14
List of workers, fishermen, and small farmholders (Arbeidere, fiskere, småbrukere liste)	4
Local List(s) (Lokale lister)	3
Total number of members:	21

Lebesby herredsstyre 1955–1959
Party name (in Norwegian)	Number of representatives
Labour Party (Arbeiderpartiet)	14
List of workers, fishermen, and small farmholders (Arbeidere, fiskere, småbrukere liste)	1
Local List(s) (Lokale lister)	4
Total number of members:	19

Lebesby herredsstyre 1951–1955
Party name (in Norwegian)	Number of representatives
Labour Party (Arbeiderpartiet)	12
Joint List(s) of Non-Socialist Parties (Borgerlige Felleslister)	3
Local List(s) (Lokale lister)	1
Total number of members:	16

Lebesby herredsstyre 1947–1951
Party name (in Norwegian)	Number of representatives
Labour Party (Arbeiderpartiet)	11
Communist Party (Kommunistiske Parti)	1
List of workers, fishermen, and small farmholders (Arbeidere, fiskere, småbrukere liste)	2
Local List(s) (Lokale lister)	2
Total number of members:	16

Lebesby herredsstyre 1945–1947
Party name (in Norwegian)	Number of representatives
Labour Party (Arbeiderpartiet)	5
List of workers, fishermen, and small farmholders (Arbeidere, fiskere, småbrukere liste)	3
Local List(s) (Lokale lister)	8
Total number of members:	16

Lebesby herredsstyre 1937–1941*
Party name (in Norwegian)	Number of representatives
Labour Party (Arbeiderpartiet)	8
List of workers, fishermen, and small farmholders (Arbeidere, fiskere, småbrukere liste)	1
Joint List(s) of Non-Socialist Parties (Borgerlige Felleslister)	6
Local List(s) (Lokale lister)	1
Total number of members:	16
Note: Due to the German occupation of Norway during World War II, no elections were held for new municipal councils until after the war ended in 1945.

=== Mayors ===
The mayor (Norwegian: ordfører) of Lebesby Municipality is the political leader of the municipality and the chairperson of the municipal council. Here is a list of people who have held this position:

- 1838–1840: Johan Karsten Garmann Schancke
- 1840–1843: Nils Pedersen
- 1843–1845: Jørres Schelderup Hansen
- 1846–1854: Henning Briks
- 1855–1857: Nicolai Christian Lassen
- 1858–1863: Bernhard Kock
- 1864–1867: Johan Fredrik Lindstrøm
- 1868–1873: Oluf August Ingemann Melbye
- 1874–1892: N. Johansen
- 1893–1895: J.B. Bøgeberg
- 1896–1898: Ole Moen
- 1899–1907: N. Johansen
- 1908–1913: O. Klykken
- 1914–1914: Andreas Olai Knutsen Steffensen
- 1914–1916: Johan Hustad
- 1917–1919: Wilhelm Lund
- 1920–1925: Ole Konrad Steinholt
- 1926–1928: Johan P. Olsen
- 1929–1931: Charlo Klykken
- 1932–1934: Johan P. Olsen
- 1935–1941: Karl Fosslund
- 1941–1942: Jens A. Horst
- 1942–1945: Sigvald Tryggeseth (NS)
- 1945–1945: Adolf Hansen
- 1945–1945: Arne Moilanen
- 1946–1950: Hans Martin Hanssen (Ap)
- 1950–1951: Bertin Jonassen
- 1952–1955: Edmund Wallenius
- 1956–1957: Viggo Lund
- 1958–1959: Gerhard Charlo Øfeldt
- 1959–1961: Viggo Lund
- 1961–1975: Aksel Samuelsberg (Ap)
- 1975–1979: Magnor Mathisen (Ap)
- 1979–1988: Edmund Varfjell (Ap)
- 1988–1998: Kristin Berg Nilsen (Ap)
- 1998–2010: Harald Larssen (Ap)
- 2010–2019: Stine Akselsen (Ap)
- 2019–present: Sigurd Kvammen Rafaelsen (Ap)

== Culture ==
=== Churches ===
The Church of Norway has two parishes (sokn) within Lebesby Municipality. It is part of the Hammerfest prosti (deanery) in the Diocese of Nord-Hålogaland.

Churches in Lebesby Municipality
Parish (sokn)	Church name	Location of the church	Year built
Kjøllefjord	Kjøllefjord Church	Kjøllefjord	1951
Lebesby	Lebesby Church	Lebesby	1962
Lebesby	Kunes Chapel	Kunes	1982

== Notable people ==
- Einar Wøhni (1920 in Lebesby – 1987), a politician
- Kathrine Nedrejord, writer (born 1987 in Kjøllefjord).
- Gørild Mauseth (born 1972 in Kjøllefjord), an actress
