= Kathrine Nedrejord =

Norwegian writer

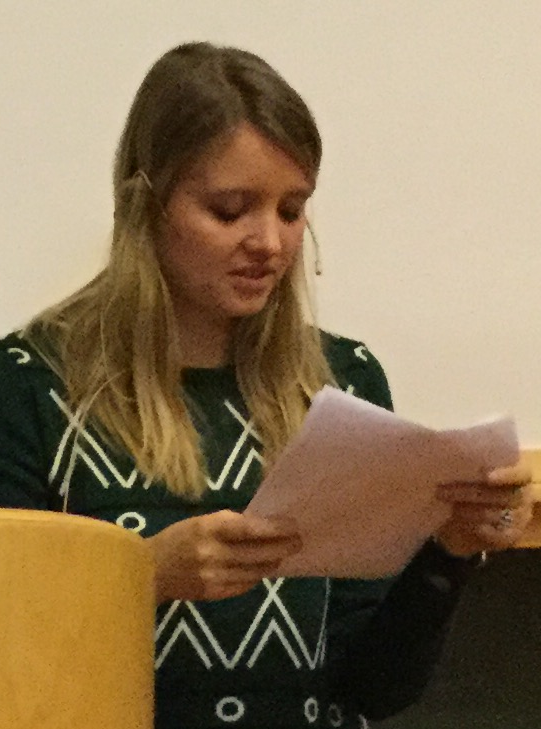
- Born: 16 September 1987 (age 38); Kjøllefjord, Norway
- Occupations: Dramatist writer stage performer
- Awards: Brage Prize (2024)

Kathrine Nedrejord (born 16 September 1987) is a Norwegian/Sami dramatist, writer and stage performer. She was awarded the Brage Prize in 2024.

== Life and career ==
Born in Kjøllefjord on 16 September 1987, Nedrejord made her debut as dramatist in 2009, with the play Utestengt, innesteng. She made her novel debut in 2010, the novel Transit, about a young woman who moves back to Norway after a long residence in Paris.

Her next books were Trengsel (2014) and her first novel for young adults, Hvem er jeg når du blir borte, which came in 2016. Further books are the novel Forvandlinga from 2018, for which she was awarded Havmannprisen, and the two youth novels Det Sara skjuler (2019) and Lappjevel! (2020). From 2018 to 2020 she was house dramatist for Nationaltheatret. In 2021 she issued Flukta til Finnmark. 1800-tallet and Det finnes ingen sannhet, and in 2022 the novel Forbryter og straff. Her book Sameproblemet earned her the Brage Prize in 2024.

== Themes ==
Literary scholar Asbjørn Rørslett Kolberg notes that several of her young adult works, such as Slepp meg (2018), portray protagonists who feel caught between cultures, struggling with questions of what it means to be "fully" Sámi. Kolberg states that the protagonist Anna in Slepp meg navigates pressure from family to speak the Sámi language and wear traditional clothing (gákti), while also confronting prejudice and stereotypes from non-Sámi peers.

Her novels often employ a first-person narrative voice to create intimacy with the reader and explore the protagonist's path towards finding their own, self-determined identity.

== Works ==
- Transit, 2010
- Trengsel, 2014
- Hvem er jeg når du blir borte, 2016
- Forvandlinga, 2018
- Slepp meg, 2018
- Det Sara skjuler, 2019
- Lappjevel!, 2020
- Flukta til Finnmark. 1800-tallet, 2021
- Det finnes ingen sannhet, 20221
- Forbryter og straff, 2022
- Sameproblemet, 2024
