= Suolojávri (Lebesby) =

Lake in Lebesby, Norway

- Interactive map of the lake
- Location: Lebesby Municipality, Finnmark
- Coordinates: 70.3613°N 26.0947°E
- Basin countries: Norway
- Max. length: 4.3 kilometres (2.7 mi)
- Max. width: 1.1 kilometres (0.68 mi)
- Surface area: 3.7 km^{2} (1.4 sq mi)
- Shore length^{1}: 11.2 kilometres (7.0 mi)
- Surface elevation: 143 metres (469 ft)
- References: NVE
- ^{1} Shore length is not a well-defined measure.

Suolojávri is a lake which lies in Lebesby Municipality in Finnmark county, Norway. The 3.47-square-kilometre (1.34 sq mi) lake lies on the Sværholt Peninsula, about halfway between the villages of Børselv and Kunes.

== See also ==
- List of lakes in Norway
