= Kjøllefjord Church =

- Kjøllefjord kirke
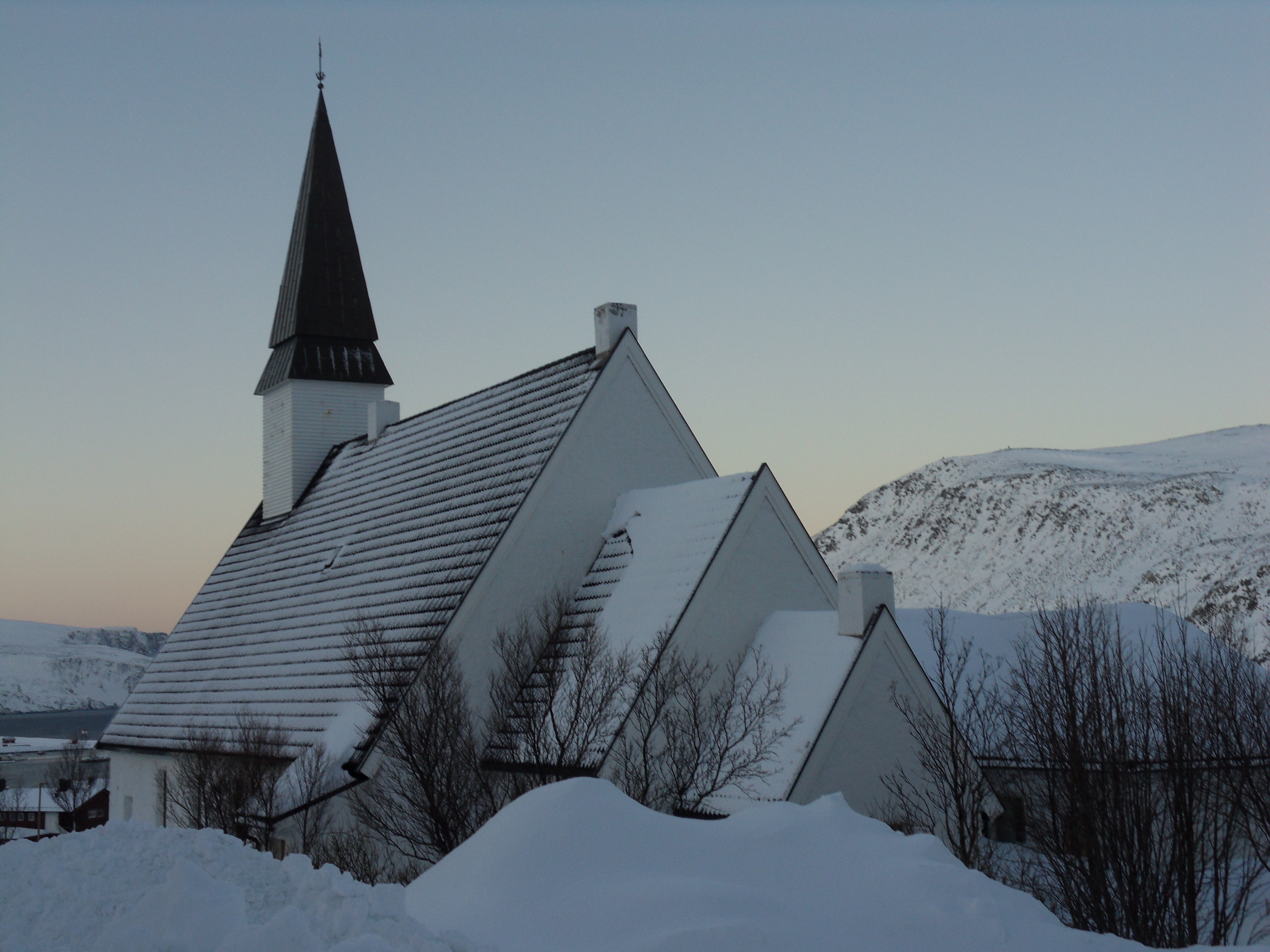
- View of the church
- Kjøllefjord Church
- 70.944440°N 27.359478°E
- Location: Lebesby Municipality, Finnmark
- Country: Norway
- Denomination: Church of Norway
- Churchmanship: Evangelical Lutheran

History
- Status: Parish church
- Founded: c. 1670
- Consecrated: 1951

Architecture
- Functional status: Active
- Architect: Finn Bryn
- Architectural type: Long church
- Completed: 1951 (75 years ago)

Specifications
- Capacity: 300
- Materials: Stone

Administration
- Diocese: Nord-Hålogaland
- Deanery: Hammerfest prosti
- Parish: Lebesby
- Norwegian Cultural Heritage Site
- Type: Church
- Status: Not protected
- ID: 84788

Kjøllefjord Church (Norwegian: Kjøllefjord kirke) is a parish church of the Church of Norway in Lebesby Municipality in Finnmark county, Norway. It is located in the village of Kjøllefjord. It is one of the churches in the Lebesby parish which is part of the Hammerfest prosti (deanery) in the Diocese of Nord-Hålogaland. The white, stone church was built in a long church style in 1951 using plans drawn up by the architect Finn Bryn (1890-1975). The church seats about 300 people.

== History ==
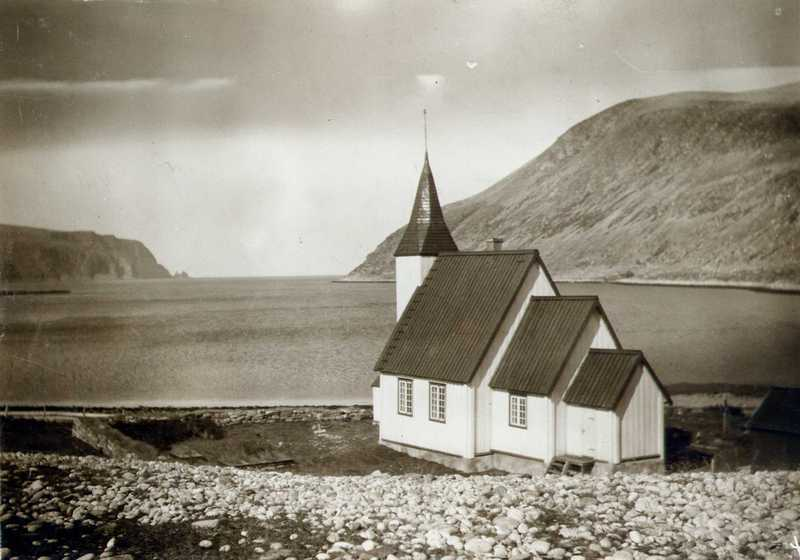
Old church (before WWII)

The first church in Kjøllefjord was built around the year 1670 after the medieval Skjøtningberg Church was closed. In 1738, the small, timber church was torn down and replaced with a new, larger church on the same site. The church was originally a cruciform design, but it was later converted to a long church design.

In 1814, this church served as an election church (Norwegian: valgkirke). Together with more than 300 other parish churches across Norway, it was a polling station for elections to the 1814 Norwegian Constituent Assembly which wrote the Constitution of Norway. This was Norway's first national elections. Each church parish was a constituency that elected people called "electors" who later met together in each county to elect the representatives for the assembly that was to meet in Eidsvoll later that year.

On 4 November 1944, the old church was burned to the ground by the retreating German army near the end of the Occupation of Norway by Nazi Germany. This was the first church rebuilt after the war. The funding for the church was from the Kingdom of Denmark which gave it as a gift to help with the rebuilding after World War II.

== See also ==
- List of churches in Nord-Hålogaland
- Liberation of Finnmark
