= Kjøllefjord =

Village in Northern Norway

Kjøllefjord (Norwegian); Gilevuonna (Northern Sami); Kelavuono (Kven)
- Village
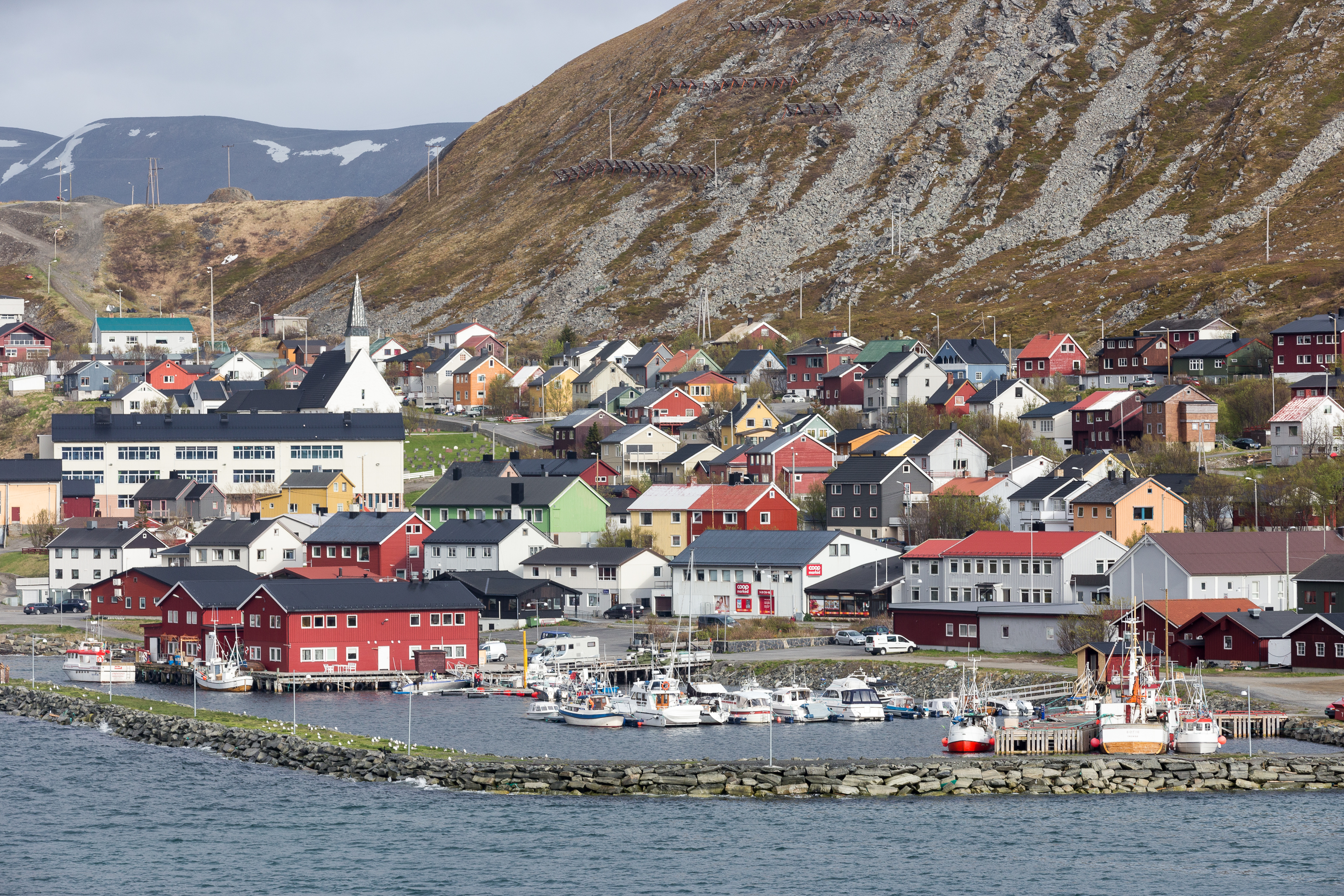
- Kjøllefjord in June 2015
- Interactive map of: Kjøllefjord (Norwegian); Gilevuonna (Northern Sami); Kelavuono (Kven)
- Location within Finnmark Location within Norway
- Coordinates: 70°56′44″N 27°20′47″E
- Country: Norway
- Region: Northern Norway
- County: Finnmark
- District: Øst-Finnmark
- Municipality: Lebesby Municipality

Area
  - Total: 0.45 km^{2} (0.17 sq mi)
- Elevation: 7 m (23 ft)

Population (2023)
  - Total: 836
  - Density: 1,858/km^{2} (4,810/sq mi)
- Time zone: UTC+01:00 (CET)
  - Summer (DST): UTC+02:00 (CEST)
- Post Code: 9790 Kjøllefjord

Kjøllefjord (Norwegian), Gilevuonna (Northern Sami), or Kelavuono (Kven) is the administrative centre of Lebesby Municipality in Finnmark county, Norway. The village is located on the northwestern part of the Nordkinn Peninsula, on the shore of a small fjord which empties into the larger Laksefjorden. The 0.45-square-kilometre (110-acre) village has a population (2023) of 836, which gives the village a population density of 1,858 inhabitants per square kilometre (4,810/sq mi) and makes it the largest village in the municipality and one of the largest fishing villages in Finnmark county.

The Hurtigruten coastal express boat has regular stops at Kjøllefjord. Kjøllefjord Church is located in the village. One of the largest fish processing and fishing companies in Kjøllefjord is a branch of Aker Seafoods. Another large company is Laksefjord Seafood AS. Kjøllefjord Airport once served the village, but it is now closed.

== Economy ==
Like all other fishing villages, Kjøllefjord has fishing as their main business. By 24 June 2015, there was a single fish processing plant operating in Kjøllefjord, Aarsæther, which has since been bought by Aker Seafoods AS, now called Norway Seafood. The company is owned by Kjell Inge Røkke. Aker Seafood has plans to continue production here as well as plans to repair and update the buildings.

In the 1970s, the small Kjøllefjord Airport was established for passenger and ambulance flights, but in the 1980s it was abandoned when the nearby Mehamn Airport was opened. Today, Mehamn Airport has routes to Hammerfest, Tromsø, Vadsø, and Kirkenes.

In 2005, Statkraft constructed a wind farm near the mountain Gartefjellet, with a maximum capacity of 40 megawatts (54,000 hp). The 17 wind turbines have an annual power output of 155 gigawatt-hours (560 TJ) and provide for the electrical needs of about 6,000 households.

The newspaper Kyst og Fjord is published in Kjøllefjord.

== History ==
Kjøllefjord has been a trading post and fishing village serving the northern edge of Norway, along the Barents Sea since the 16th century. In 1685, the county governor Hans H. Lilienskiold took a journey along the coast of Finnmark county. He visited the village of Kjøllefjord and he noted that there was a landowning widow who also traded while three other traders worked here for merchants from Bergen.

In 1690, Finnmark county was divided into seven trading districts. The author Jonas Lie wrote in the book Tremasteren Fremtiden about the village of Kjøllefjord. He gives a picture of the old monopoly trade system of that era. He writes: "Som opplagssted for Finnmarkske produkter der hentedes av bergensere og senere danske skip, som havn for russiske lodjer der lå og tusket langs kysten, og som nødhavn for fremmede skip i hvitehavsfarten på Arkhangelsk, hersket der alltid meget liv og røre" which means "As a storeroom for Finnmark products, which were picked up by ships from Bergen and later by Danish ships, as a port for Russian lodgers who bartered and traded along the coast, and as a haven for foreign ships from the White Sea that were shipping from Arkhangelsk, there was always a lot of life and stir."

Like so many other places in Finnmark, Kjøllefjord's buildings were set ablaze by German soldiers in the fall of 1944, and the entire population of approximately 700 people were evacuated and scattered throughout the country. After the liberation in 1945, most residents came back. The rebuilding began, regulation plans were prepared and eventually the permanent building plans. In a very short time, the business community was rebuilt and nine relatively modern fisheries started up their business.

The fishing fleet grew rapidly, and many skilled fishermen brought ashore an annual average of 12,690 tonnes (12,490 long tons; 13,990 short tons) of fish in the years 1950, 1951, and 1952. This large haul included 4,835 tonnes (4,759 long tons; 5,330 short tons) was pollock, 3,290 tonnes (3,240 long tons; 3,630 short tons) were cod, 2,961 tonnes (2,914 long tons; 3,264 short tons) of herring, and 1,604 tonnes (1,579 long tons; 1,768 short tons) of other fish species. In 1954, the fishing fleet totaled 155 boats. Of these, 27 boats were between 30 and 50 feet (9.1 and 15.2 m) and there were ten boats over 50 feet (15 m). The rest of the boats were under 30 feet (9.1 m). Throughout history, fishing has been the nerve center for the community's activities, in good as well as bad times. After the war, 14 stores, two smaller hotels, and five cafes were built and the population increased to 1,700 inhabitants.

== Attractions ==
In recent years tourism has become an important part of Kjøllefjord's economy. Arctic Coast AS holds the primary responsibility for tourist information and excursions in and around Kjøllefjord. The company offers a snowmobile safari under the northern lights, guided bus tours and, in collaboration with Davvi Siida, excursions based on Sami culture and local history for tourists all year round.

In the greater Kjøllefjord area, there are over 240 kilometres (150 mi) of marked hiking trails, several of which originate from Kjøllefjord. Most of these trails are old trails where people walked between the settlements in the old days. There is a wonderful view of all the trails in the area, and it is easy to navigate. Areas west of the peninsula are very popular for hunting and fishing. Grouse is the most common prey, but people also hunt a lot of hares. In the waters around Kjøllefjord, you can find large Arctic char and trout populations. On 3 July 2013, a new world record for halibut caught on a fishing rod was set when a 233.5-kilogram (515 lb) fish was pulled in.

The Finnkirka (the inspiration for the municipal coat of arms) is located on the west side of the Nordkinnhalvøya and is a majestic and weathered sea cliff that has a shape that resembles a church. It is believed to have once been an ancient Sami sacrificial site and is still used as a landmark for seafarers. During the winter, the municipality has bright, colored lights (representing the northern lights) that light up the cliffs.

Kjøllefjord is known for its active cultural life which includes the Chrisfestivalen music festival. Every summer in late June, this small music festival is held and it is named after blues artist Christian (Kris) Lyngedal who was from Kjøllefjord.

Football is a popular sport in Kjøllefjord for adolescents and adults. Kjøllefjord and neighboring Mehamn share a single team (since 1992) in the Nordkynn football club, which plays in the 3rd division of Norwegian football. In 1987, a sports hall was constructed.

== Geography ==
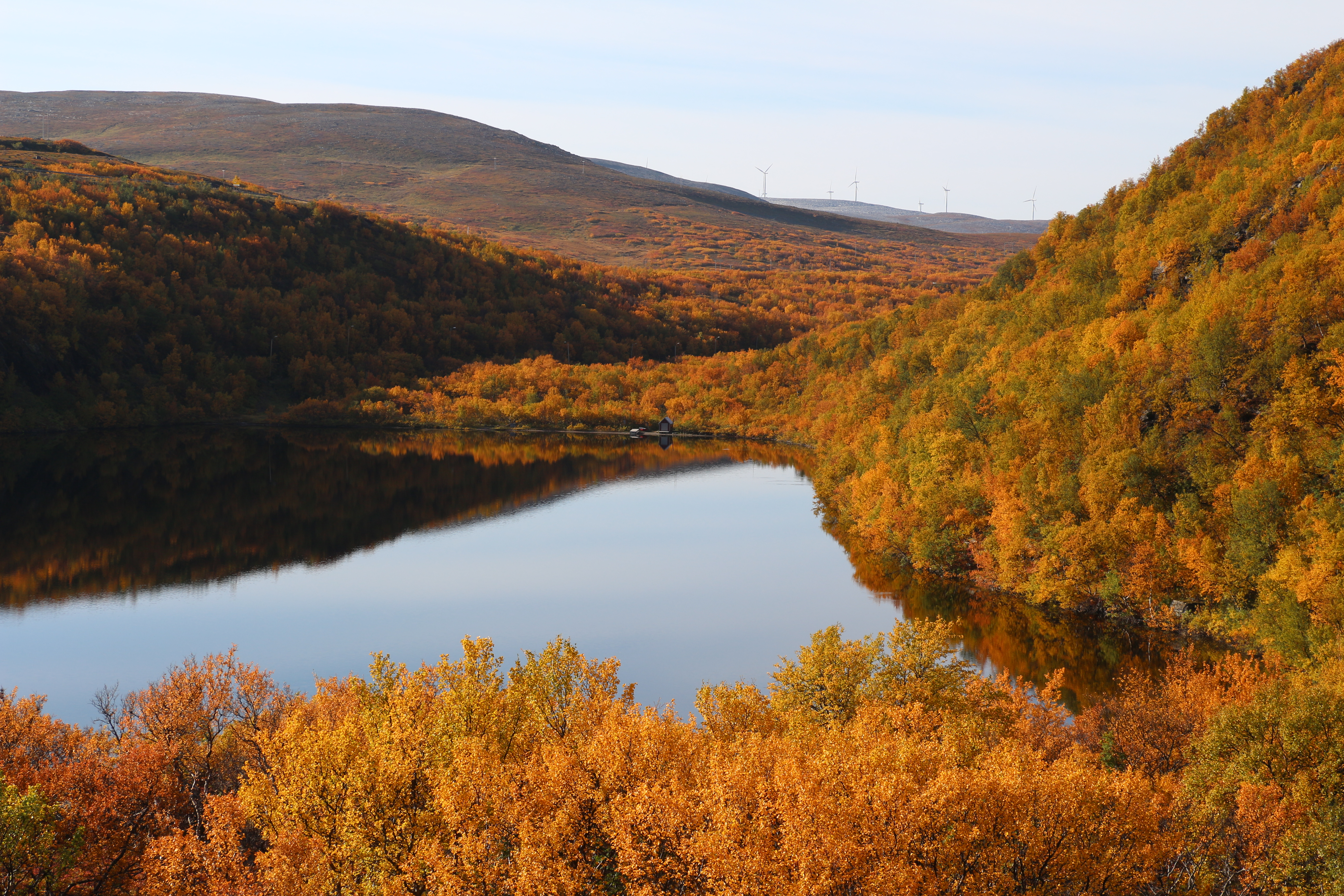
The forests around town in autumn

The scenery in the area is diverse, with both plateaus and valleys with rich vegetation. After about a 20-minute hike from Kjøllefjord to the east, one comes to the world's northernmost broadleaf forests with large birch trees. The area consists of Oksevågdalen, where one finds rivers and lakes.

The climate can be summarized as follows: Most of the precipitation falls in the autumn and the winter. April and May are the driest months. Precipitation then rises again somewhat during the summer. February is the coldest month and July / August are the hottest months of the year. Southerly winds are most prominent in the autumn and winter months and northerly winds are most prominent in summer. The dark season lasts from November 18 to January 25, while the bright nights begin on April 24 and end on August 20. The midnight sun can be seen the first time on May 13 and the last time on July 31.

Kjøllefjord sits near the western edge of the Øst-Finnmark district. The place is totally out onto the Arctic Ocean, therefore there may be harsh conditions from northwesterly winds. Two inner breakwaters screen the marina and industrial piers from the sea. Kjøllefjord is 30 kilometres (19 mi) from the airport in Mehamn, Mehamn Airport. In 1989 a road was completed to Kjøllefjord, finally connecting it to the rest of Norway by road.

== Education ==
The school building that stands in Kjøllefjord was new at the start of the school year in 1956, and in 1963 it was added. In connection with the introduction of the Curriculum in 1997, they got a modern annex which is currently used for 1st grade and the SFO. At primary school in Kjøllefjord, there are about 150 pupils in 1st-10th grade. The school has a total of 23 teachers plus several assistants and support staff.

Since 2005, Kjøllefjord joined the LOSA project, which allowed high school students to take their first year of high school online from home rather than traveling to the nearest high school (which can be far away).
