= Kunes Chapel =

- Kunes kapell
- Kunes Chapel
- 70.3436399°N 26.507240°E
- Location: Lebesby Municipality, Finnmark
- Country: Norway
- Denomination: Church of Norway
- Churchmanship: Evangelical Lutheran

History
- Status: Chapel

Architecture
- Functional status: Active
- Completed: 1982 (44 years ago)

Specifications
- Materials: Wood

Administration
- Diocese: Nord-Hålogaland
- Deanery: Hammerfest prosti
- Parish: Lebesby

Kunes Chapel (Norwegian: Kunes kapell) is a chapel of the Church of Norway in Lebesby Municipality in Finnmark county, Norway. It is located in the village of Kunes. It is an annex chapel for the Lebesby parish which is part of the Hammerfest prosti (deanery) in the Diocese of Nord-Hålogaland. The small chapel was built in 1982 and it serves the southern part of the municipality of Lebesby.

== See also ==
- List of churches in Nord-Hålogaland
