= Lebesby Church =

- Lebesby kirke
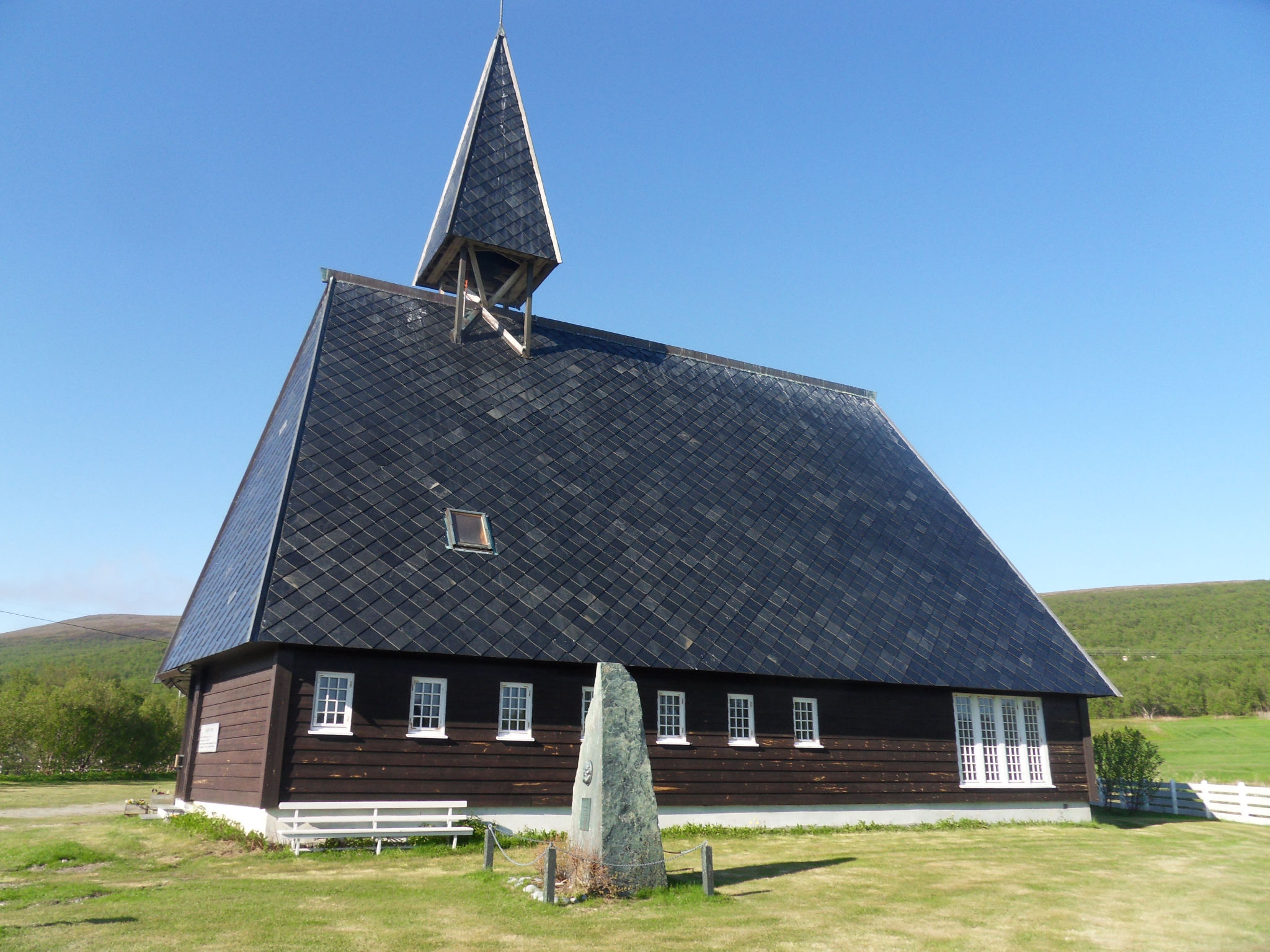
- View of the church
- Lebesby Church
- 70.573141°N 27.003938°E
- Location: Lebesby Municipality, Finnmark
- Country: Norway
- Denomination: Church of Norway
- Churchmanship: Evangelical Lutheran

History
- Status: Parish church
- Founded: 1834
- Consecrated: 1962

Architecture
- Functional status: Active
- Architect: Odd Borgrud Pedersen
- Architectural type: Rectangular
- Completed: 1962 (64 years ago)

Specifications
- Capacity: 170
- Materials: Wood

Administration
- Diocese: Nord-Hålogaland
- Deanery: Hammerfest prosti
- Parish: Lebesby
- Norwegian Cultural Heritage Site
- Type: Church
- Status: Not protected
- ID: 84921

Lebesby Church (Norwegian: Lebesby kirke) is a parish church of the Church of Norway in Lebesby Municipality in Finnmark county, Norway. It is located in the village of Lebesby. It is one of the churches for the Lebesby parish which is part of the Hammerfest prosti (deanery) in the Diocese of Nord-Hålogaland. The brown, wooden church was built in a rectangular style in 1962, eighteen years after the old church (built in 1881) was burned down during the German withdrawal from Finnmark during World War II. This church was designed by the architect Odd Borgrud Pedersen. The church seats about 170 people and it was consecrated in 1962.

== History ==
The first church built in Lebesby was in 1834. In 1881, the old church was torn down and replaced with a new church on the same site. In 1944, the church was burned down by the retreating German army at the end of World War II. In 1962, a new church was built on the same site to replace the previous building.

== Media gallery ==
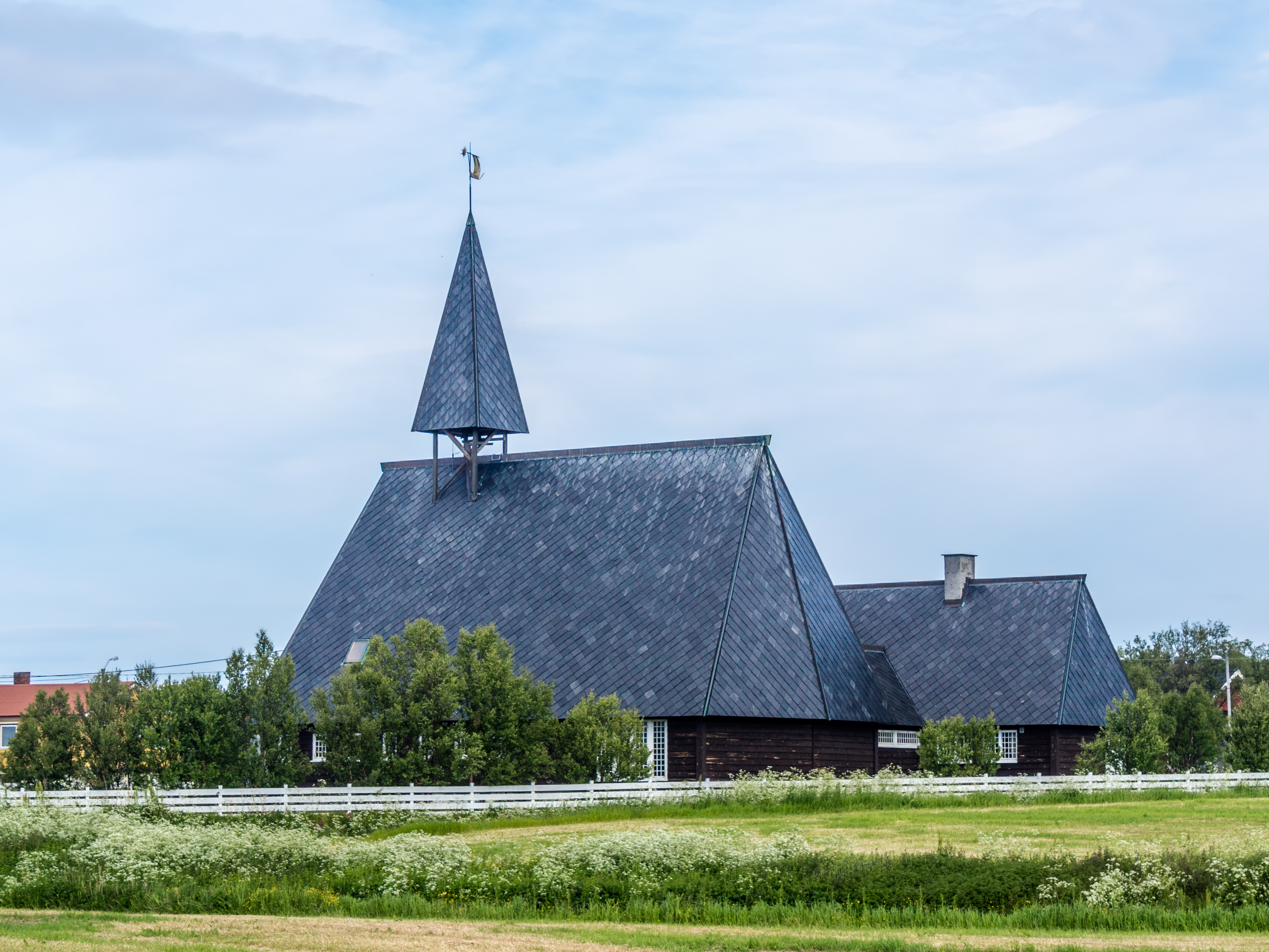

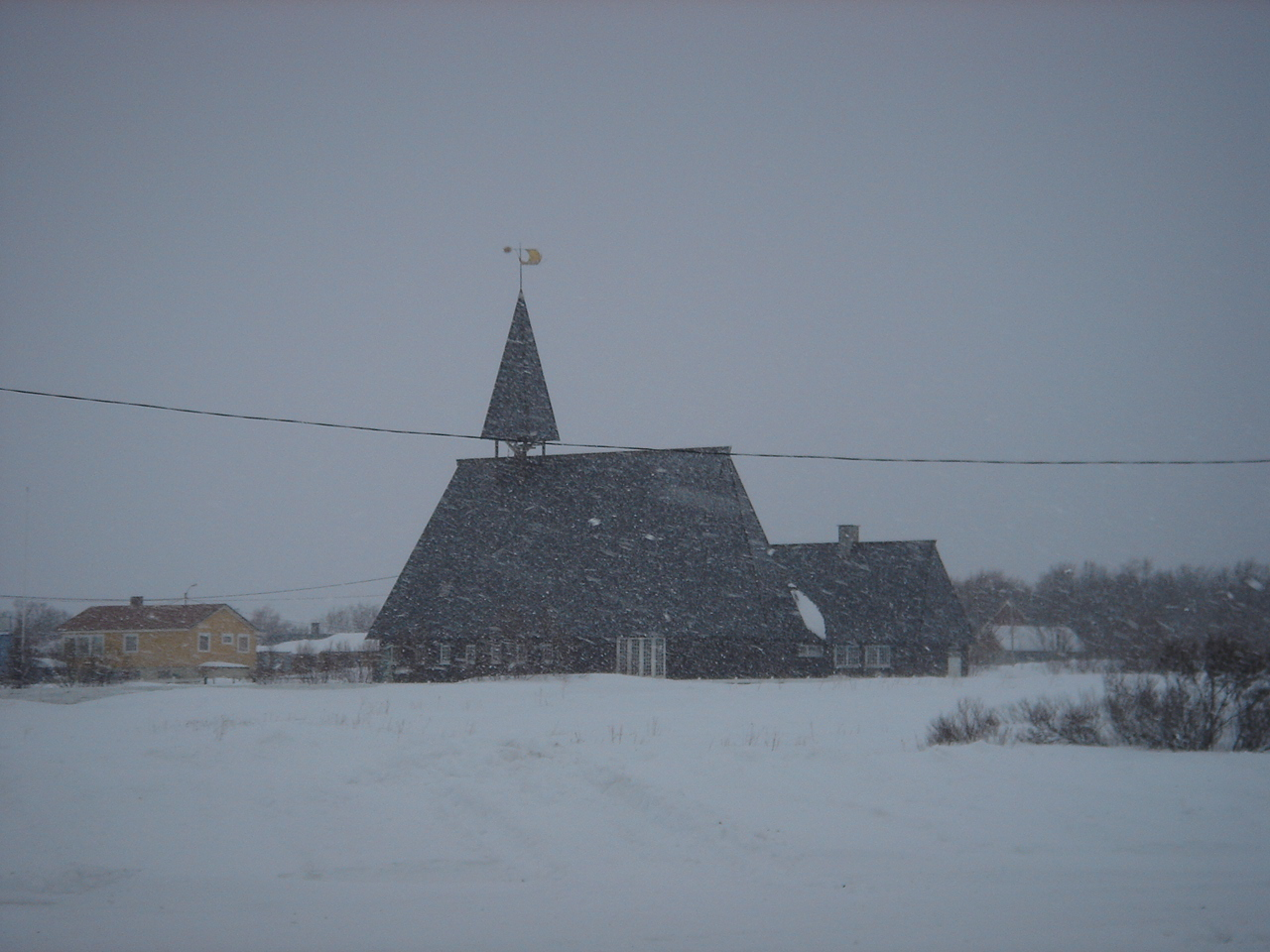

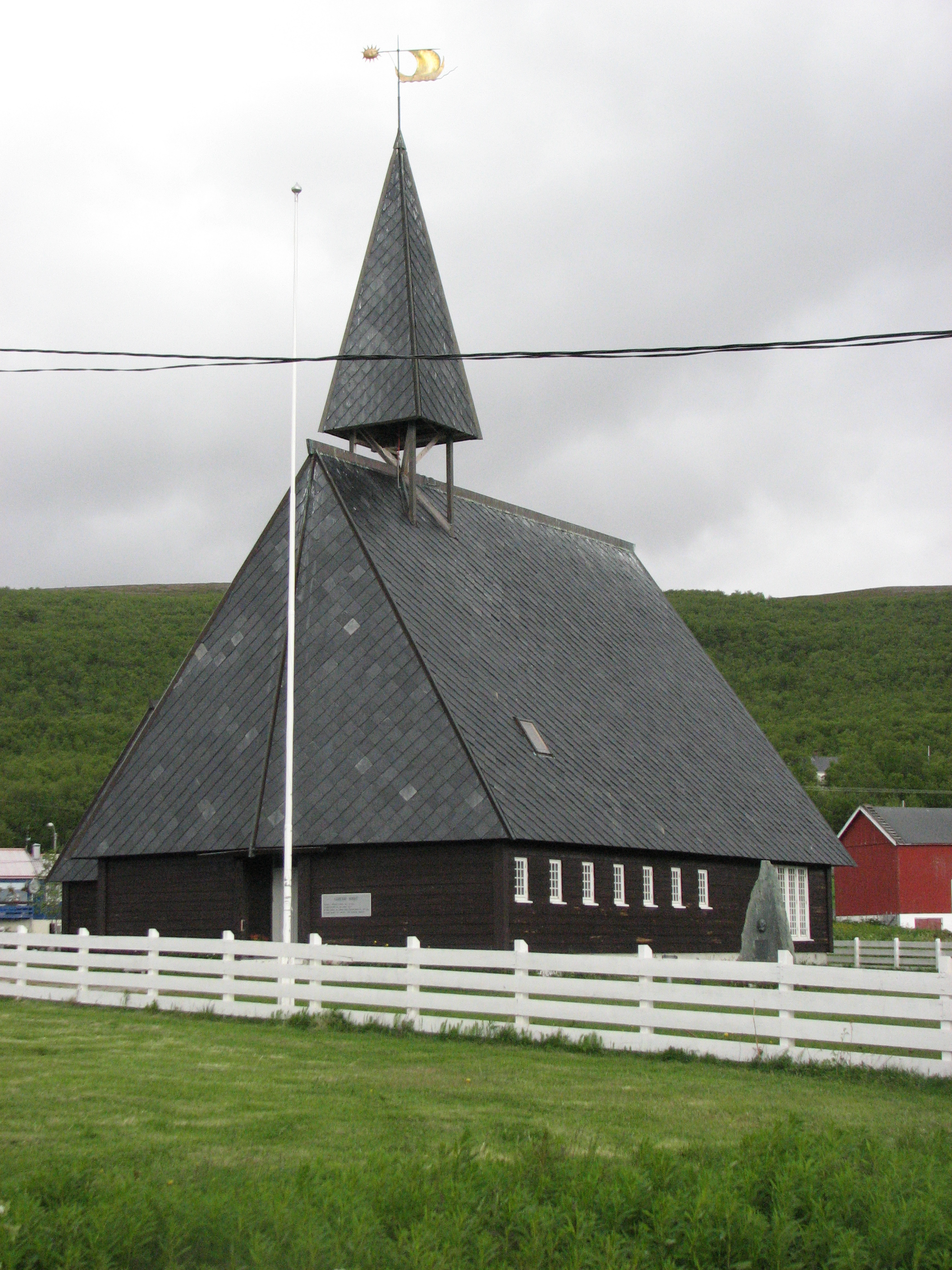

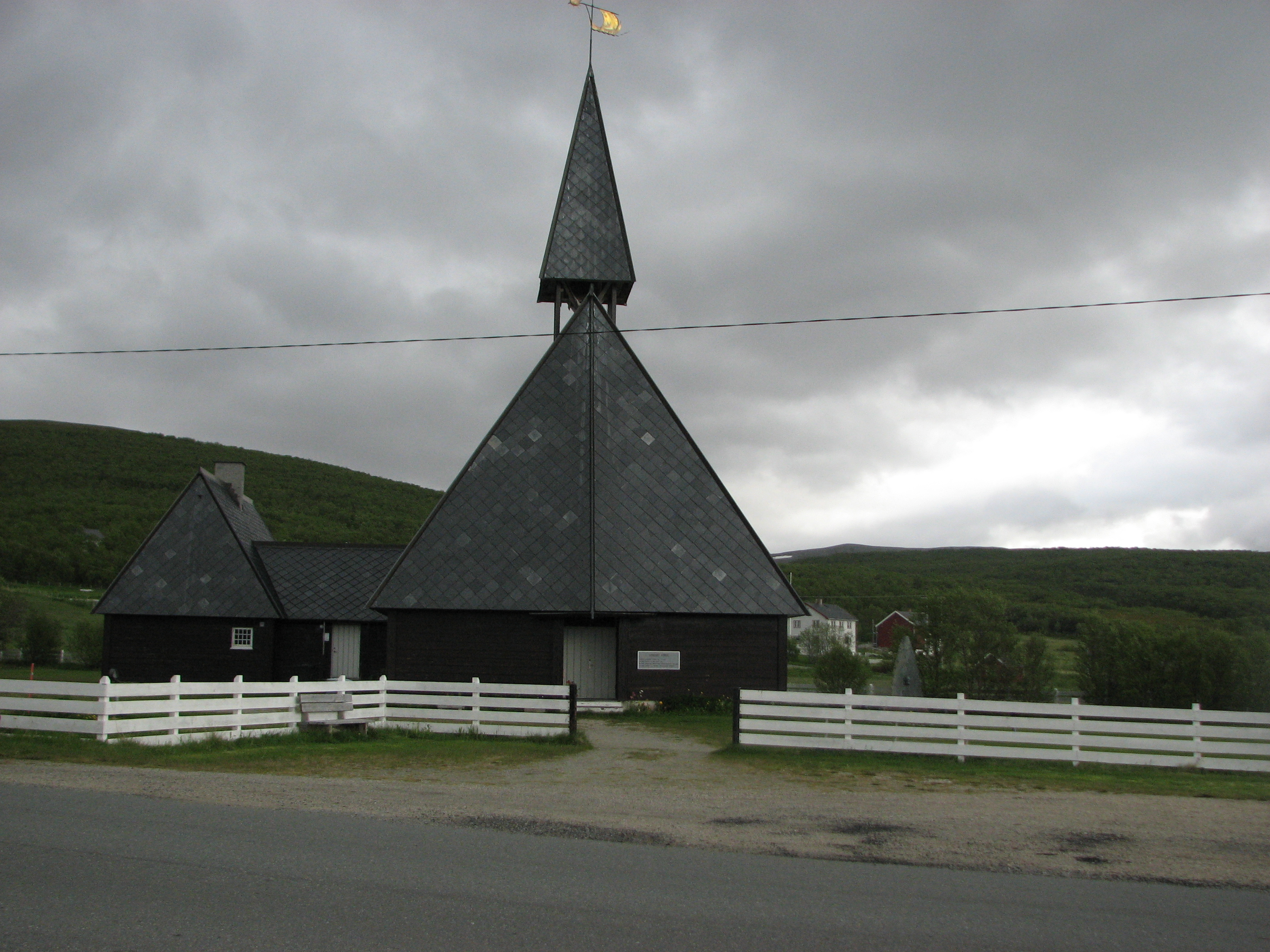

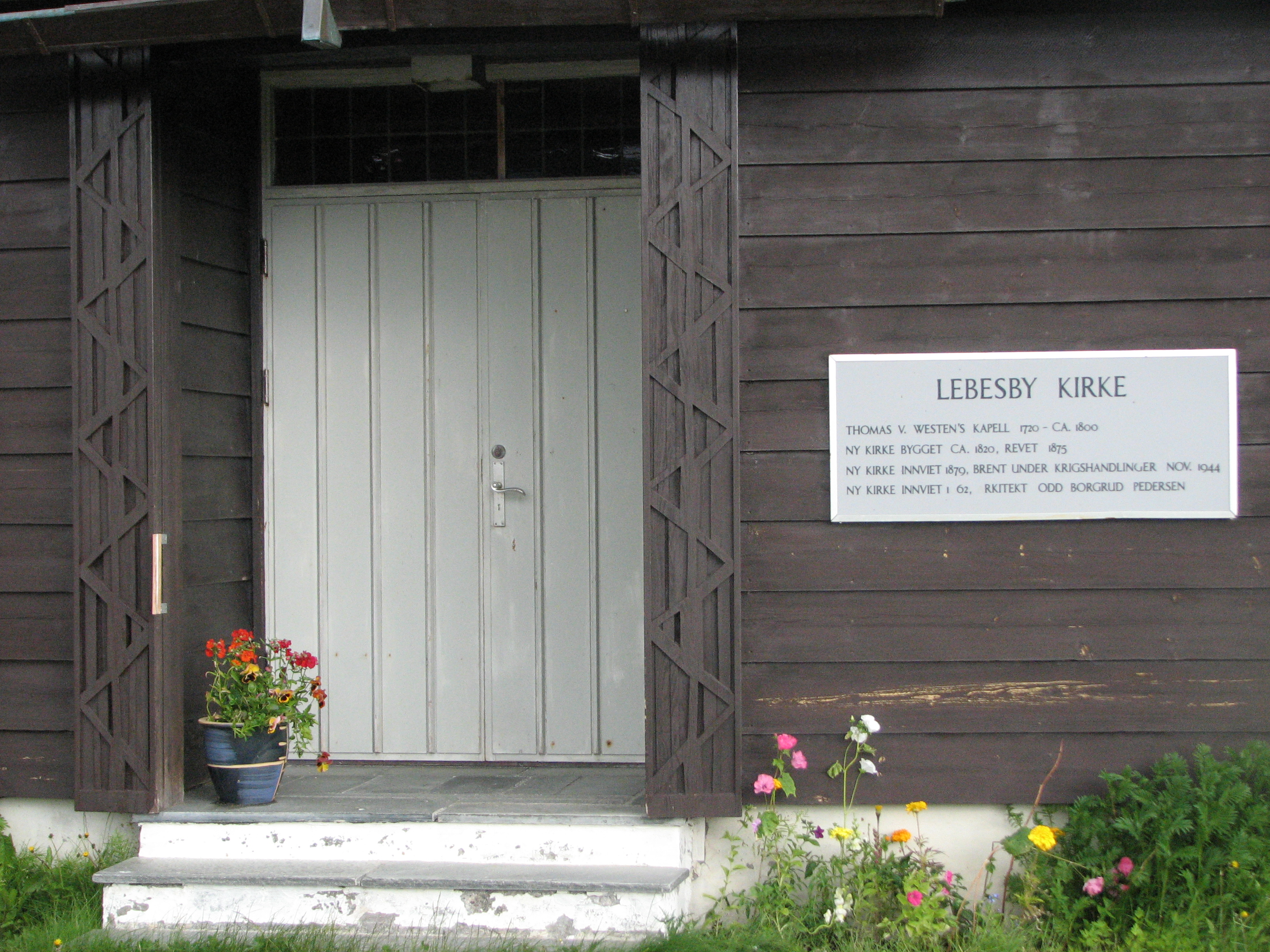

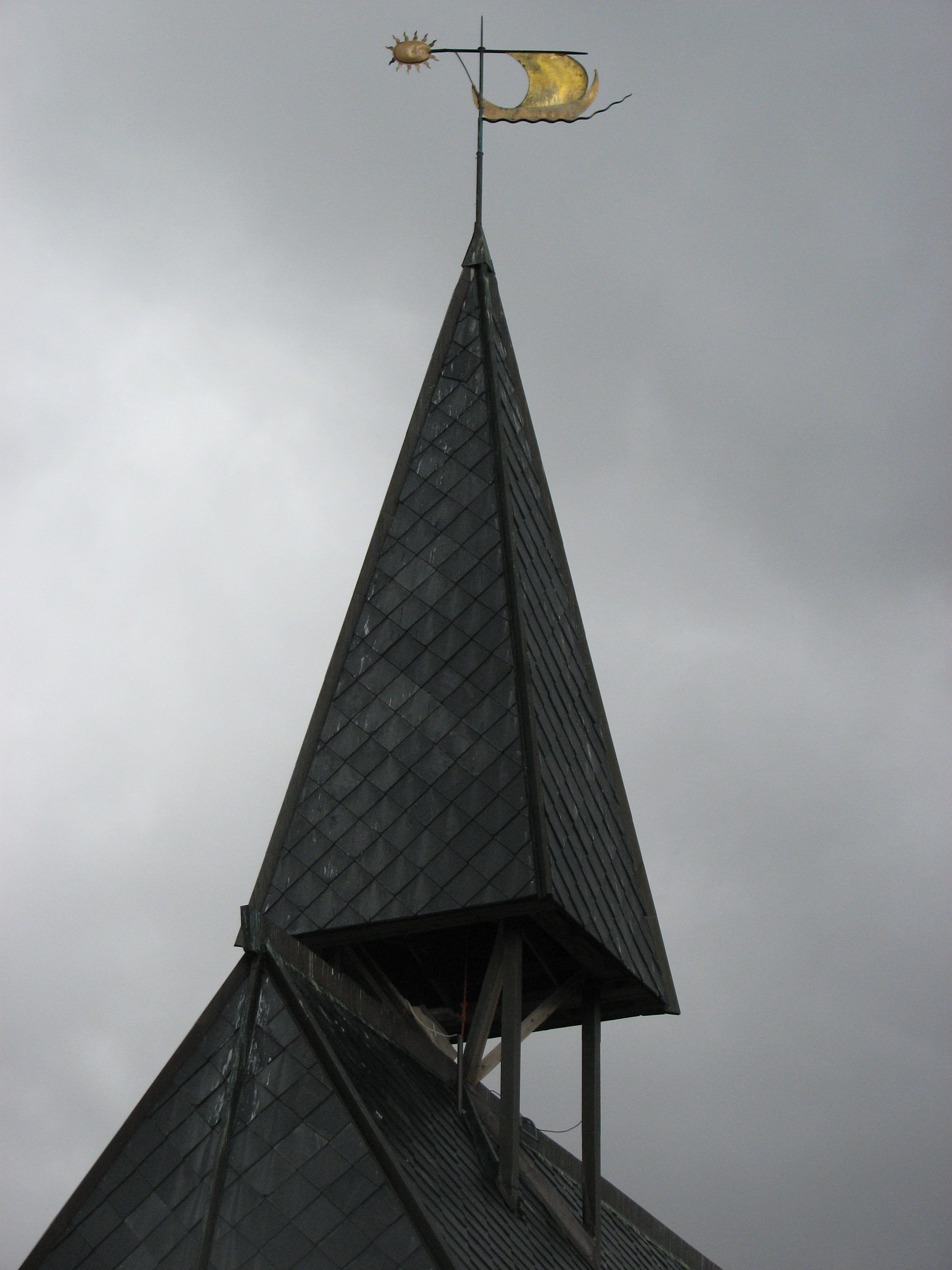

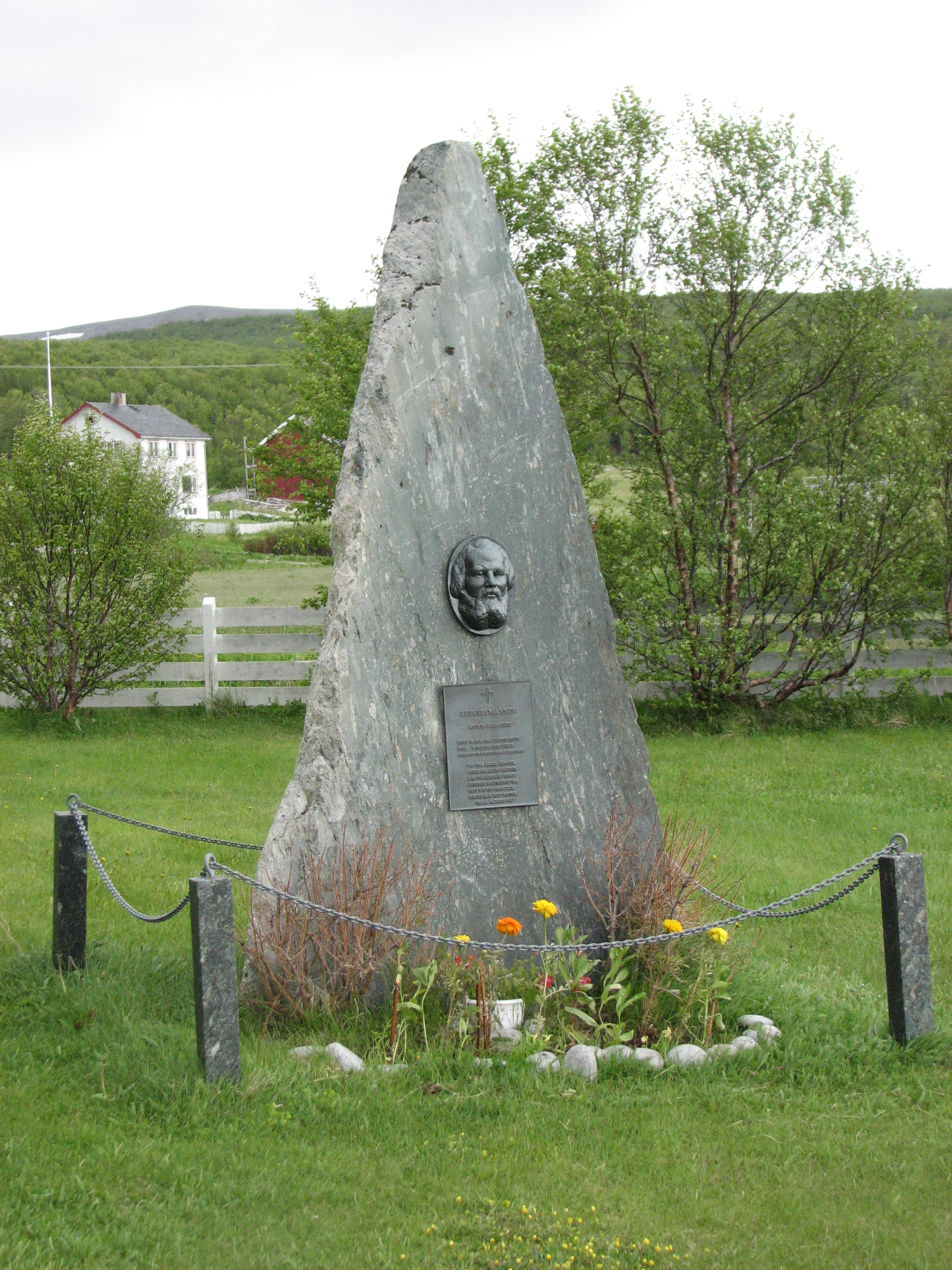

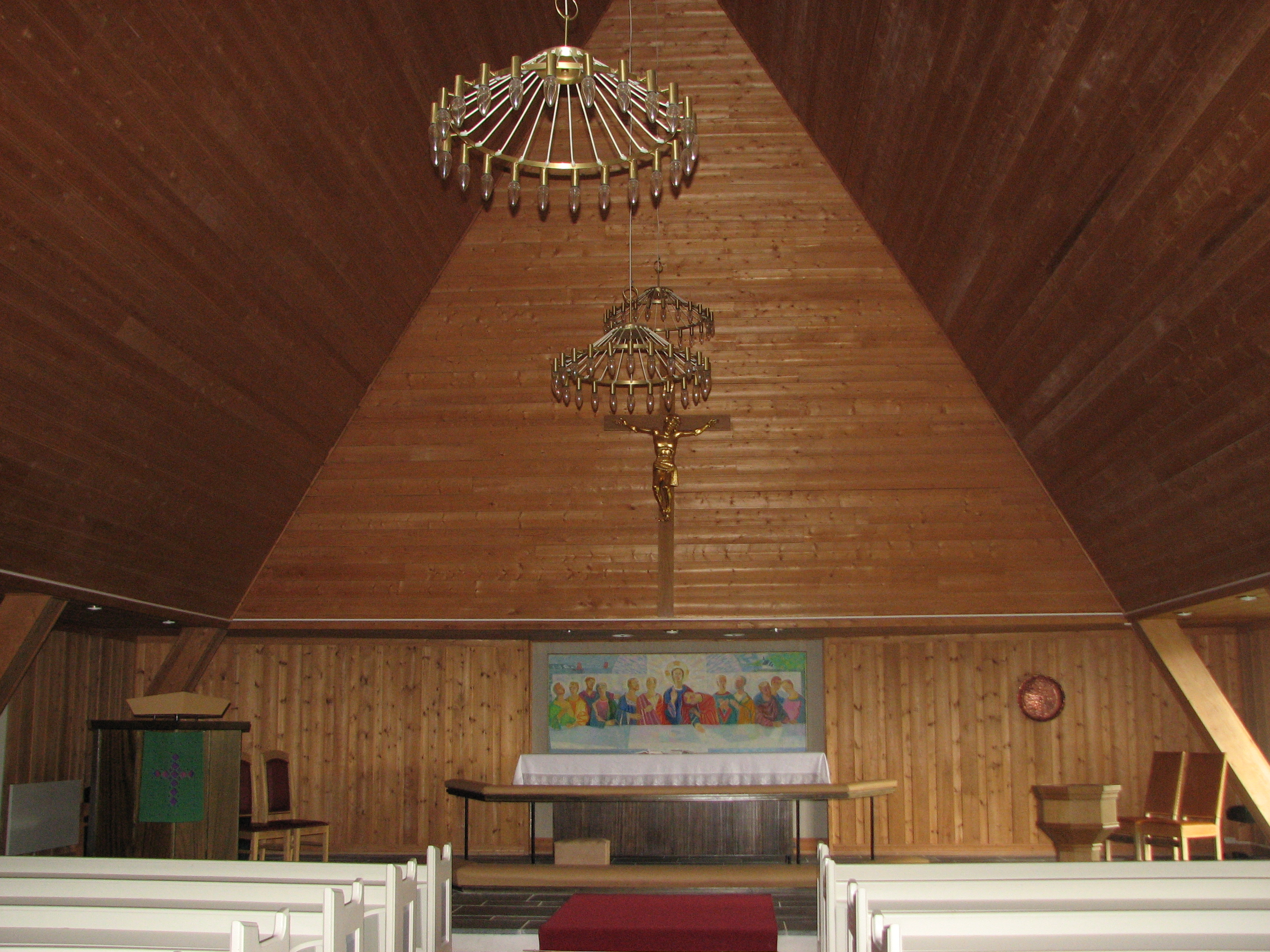

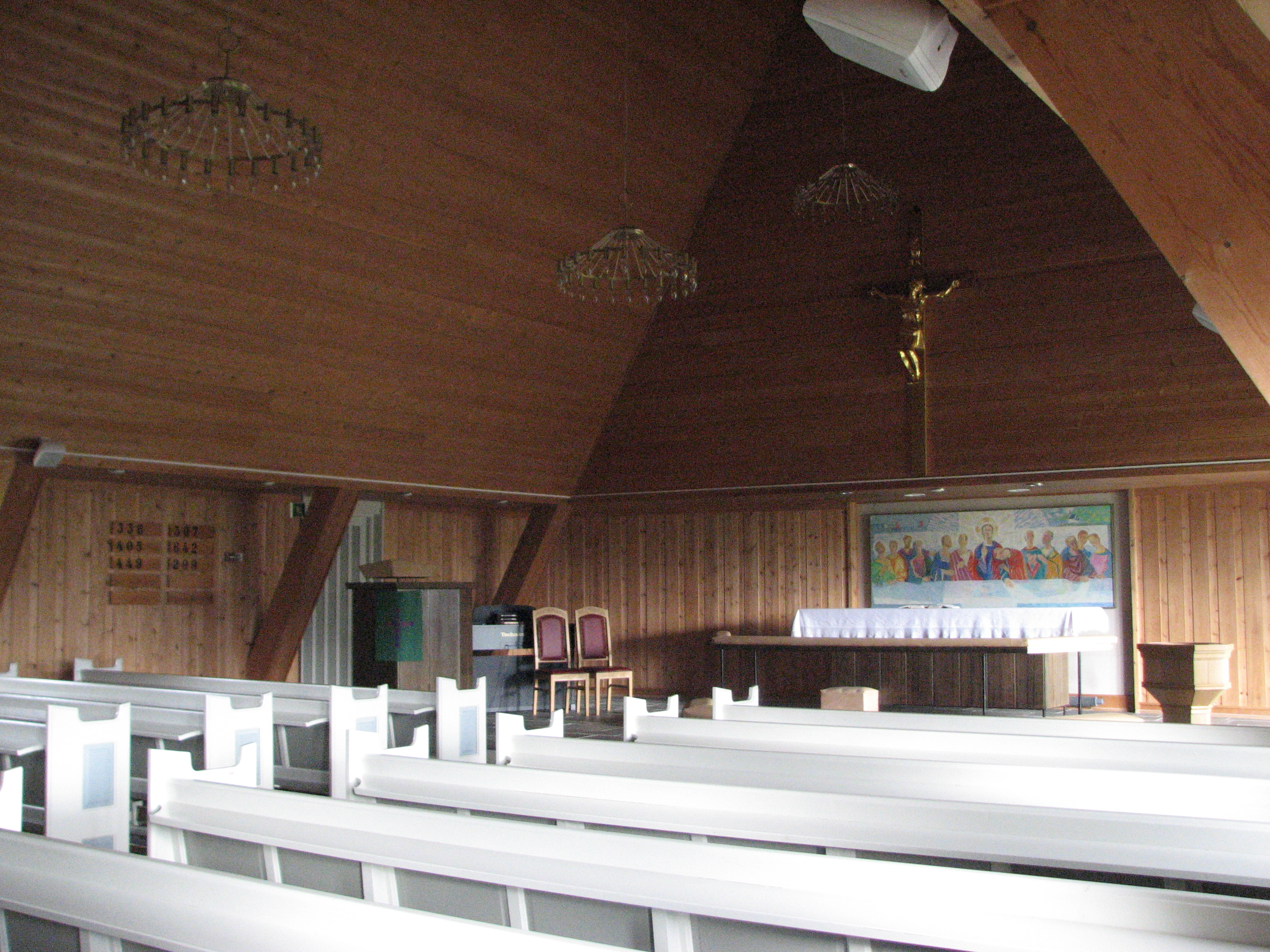

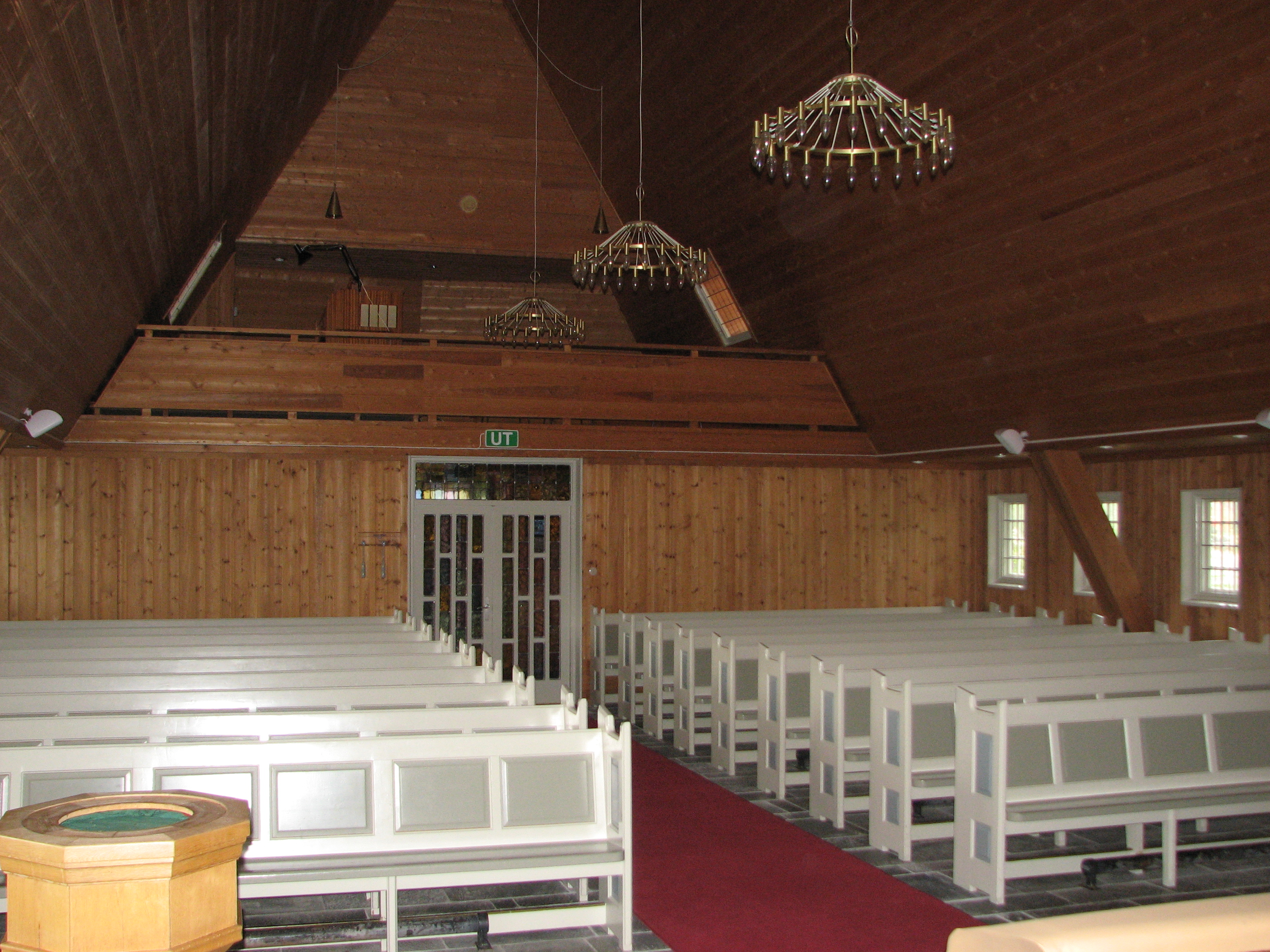

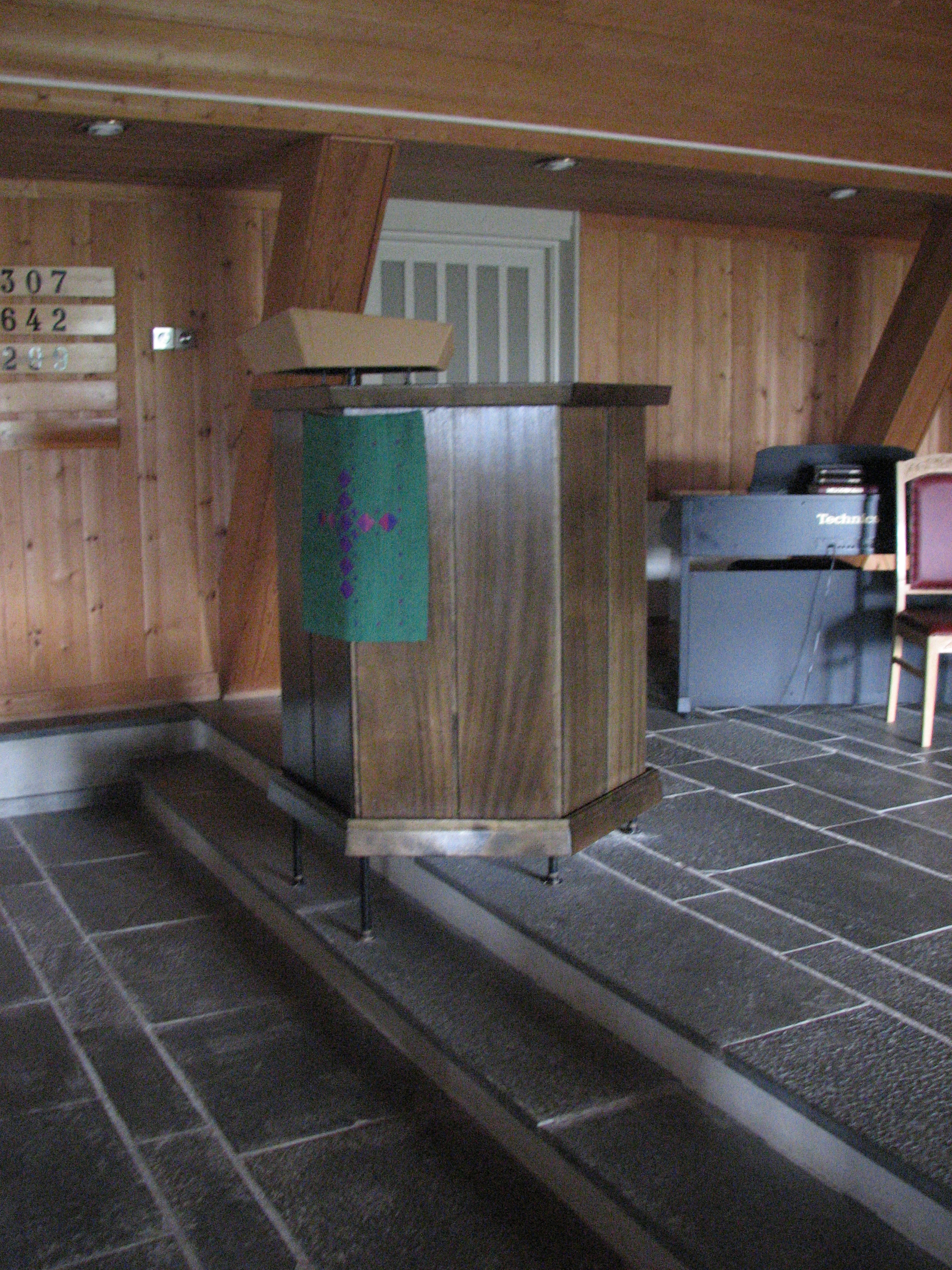

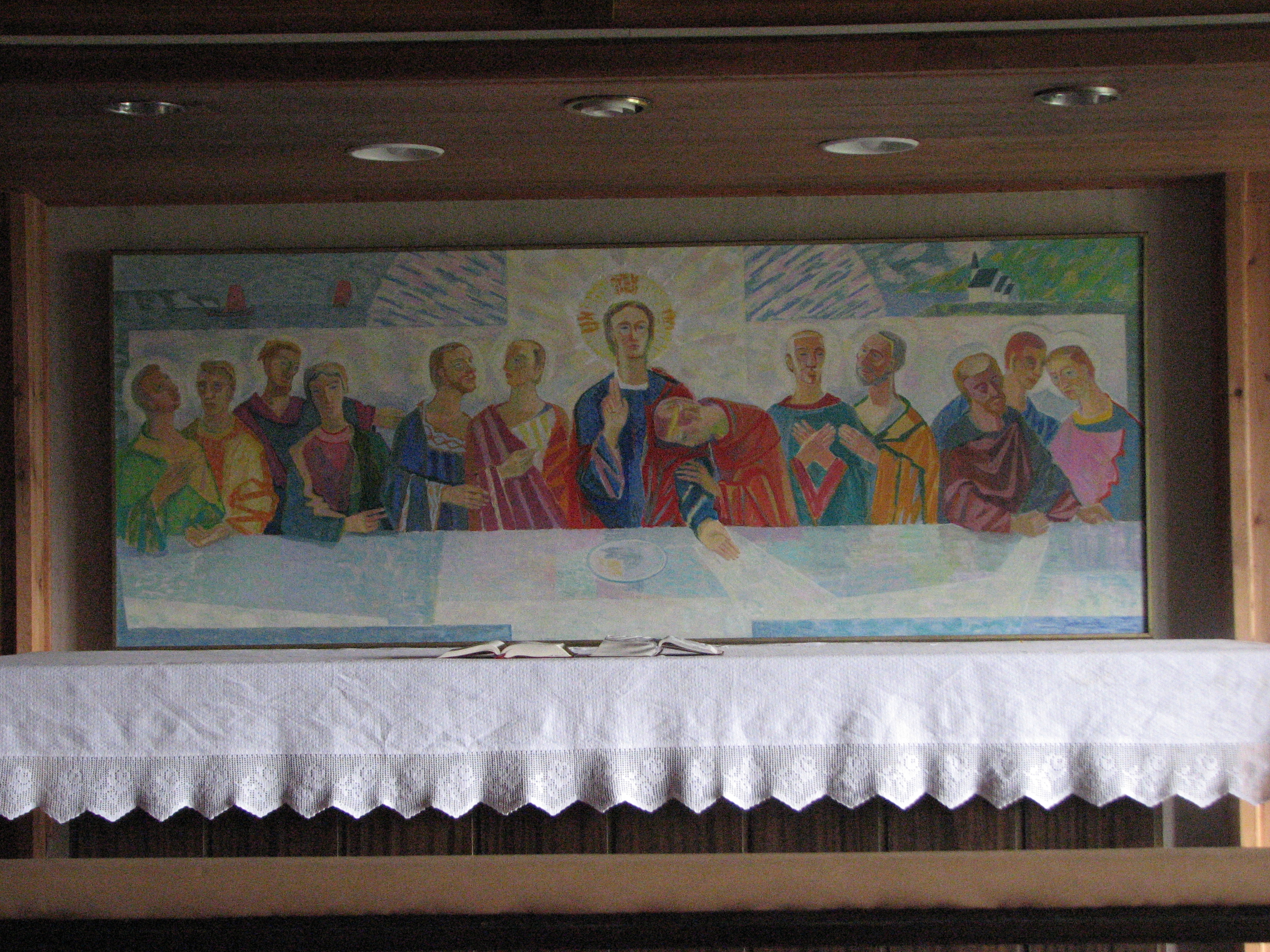

== See also ==
- List of churches in Nord-Hålogaland
