= Guolehis Suolojávri =

Lake in Kautokeino, Norway

- Interactive map of the lake
- Location: Finnmark
- Coordinates: 68.8185°N 23.3519°E
- Basin countries: Norway
- Max. length: 6.6 kilometres (4.1 mi)
- Max. width: 2 kilometres (1.2 mi)
- Surface area: 6.12 km^{2} (2.36 sq mi)
- Shore length^{1}: 27.45 kilometres (17.06 mi)
- Surface elevation: 371 metres (1,217 ft)
- References: NVE
- ^{1} Shore length is not a well-defined measure.

Guolehis Suolojávri is a lake in Guovdageainnu Municipality in Finnmark county, Norway. The 6.12-square-kilometre (2.36 sq mi) lake lies about 300 metres (980 ft) west of the lake Suolojávri and about 12 kilometres (7.5 mi) north of the Norway-Finland border.

== See also ==
- List of lakes in Norway
