= Oksfjorden (Finnmark) =

Fjord in Lebesby municipality, Norway

Oksfjorden (Norwegian); Vuoksavuotna (Northern Sami)
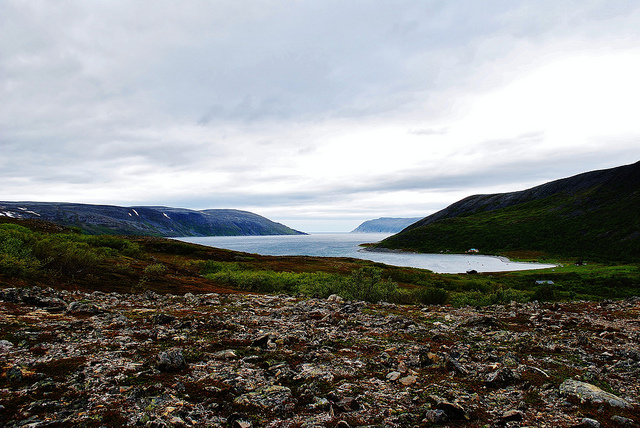
- View of the fjord
- Interactive map of the fjord
- Location: Finnmark county, Norway
- Coordinates: 70.9873°N 27.5341°E
- Type: Fjord
- Basin countries: Norway
- Max. length: 12 kilometres (7.5 mi)
- Max. width: 6 kilometres (3.7 mi)

Oksfjorden {Norwegian; lit. 'Axe fjord') or Vuoksavuotna (Northern Sami) is a fjord in Lebesby Municipality in Finnmark county, Norway. It is located just southwest of Cape Nordkinn on the Nordkinn Peninsula. The uninhabited fishing village of Oksevåg is located at the innermost part of the fjord.

== See also ==
- List of Norwegian fjords
