= Oksfjorden (Troms) =

Fjord in Nordreisa, Norway

Oksfjorden (Norwegian); Ákšovuotna (Northern Sami); Aksuvuono (Kven)
- Interactive map of: Oksfjorden (Norwegian); Ákšovuotna (Northern Sami); Aksuvuono (Kven)
- Location: Troms county, Norway
- Coordinates: 69.9119°N 21.2318°E
- Type: Fjord
- Primary outflows: Reisafjorden
- Basin countries: Norway
- Max. length: 5.5 kilometres (3.4 mi)

Oksfjorden (Norwegian), Ákšovuotna (Northern Sami), or Aksuvuono (Kven) is a small fjord inlet in Nordreisa Municipality in Troms county, Norway. At the innermost part of the fjord, lies the village of Oksfjordhamn. The European route E06 highway runs along the southern side of the fjord. The fjord empties into the large Reisafjorden to the west.

== See also ==
- List of Norwegian fjords
