= Suolojávri (Kautokeino) =

Lake in Kautokeino, Norway

- Interactive map of the lake
- Location: Kautokeino, Finnmark
- Coordinates: 68.802°N 23.397°E
- Basin countries: Norway
- Max. length: 5 kilometres (3.1 mi)
- Max. width: 2 kilometres (1.2 mi)
- Surface area: 7.09 km^{2} (2.74 sq mi)
- Shore length^{1}: 17.72 kilometres (11.01 mi)
- Surface elevation: 373 metres (1,224 ft)
- References: NVE
- ^{1} Shore length is not a well-defined measure.

Suolojávri is a lake in Kautokeino Municipality in Finnmark county, Norway. The 7.09-square-kilometre (2.74 sq mi) lake lies on the Finnmarksvidda plateau in the southern part of the municipality, just 250 metres (820 ft) east of the lake Guolehis Suolojávri and about 10 kilometres (6.2 mi) north of the border with Finland.

== See also ==
- List of lakes in Norway
