= Nordkinnhalvøya =

Peninsula in Finnmark, Norway

Nordkinn Peninsula Nordkinnhalvøya (Norwegian) Čorgašnjárga (Northern Sami)
- Peninsula
- Interactive map of the lake
- Coordinates: 71°00′58″N 28°01′54″E
- Location: Finnmark, Norway
- Offshore water bodies: Laksefjorden, Tanafjorden, Barents Sea
- Highest elevation: 486 metres (1,594 ft) (Storvarden)

Nordkinnhalvøya (English: Nordkinn Peninsula; Northern Sami: Čorgašnjárga) is a peninsula in Finnmark county, Norway. It is the northernmost part of mainland Europe. The peninsula is shared between Lebesby Municipality and Gamvik Municipality (and a small part of Tana Municipality is located along the base of the peninsula). Human settlement is mostly concentrated on the northern shores and at the base of the peninsula, while the middle parts of the peninsula are sparsely inhabited. The main villages on the peninsula are Mehamn, Gamvik, and Kjøllefjord—all located on the northern shore. Slettnes Lighthouse near Gamvik is the northernmost lighthouse on mainland Europe.

The world's northernmost labyrinth is located on the peninsula; the labyrinths in Finnmark were created in the period 1200–1500.

== Geography ==
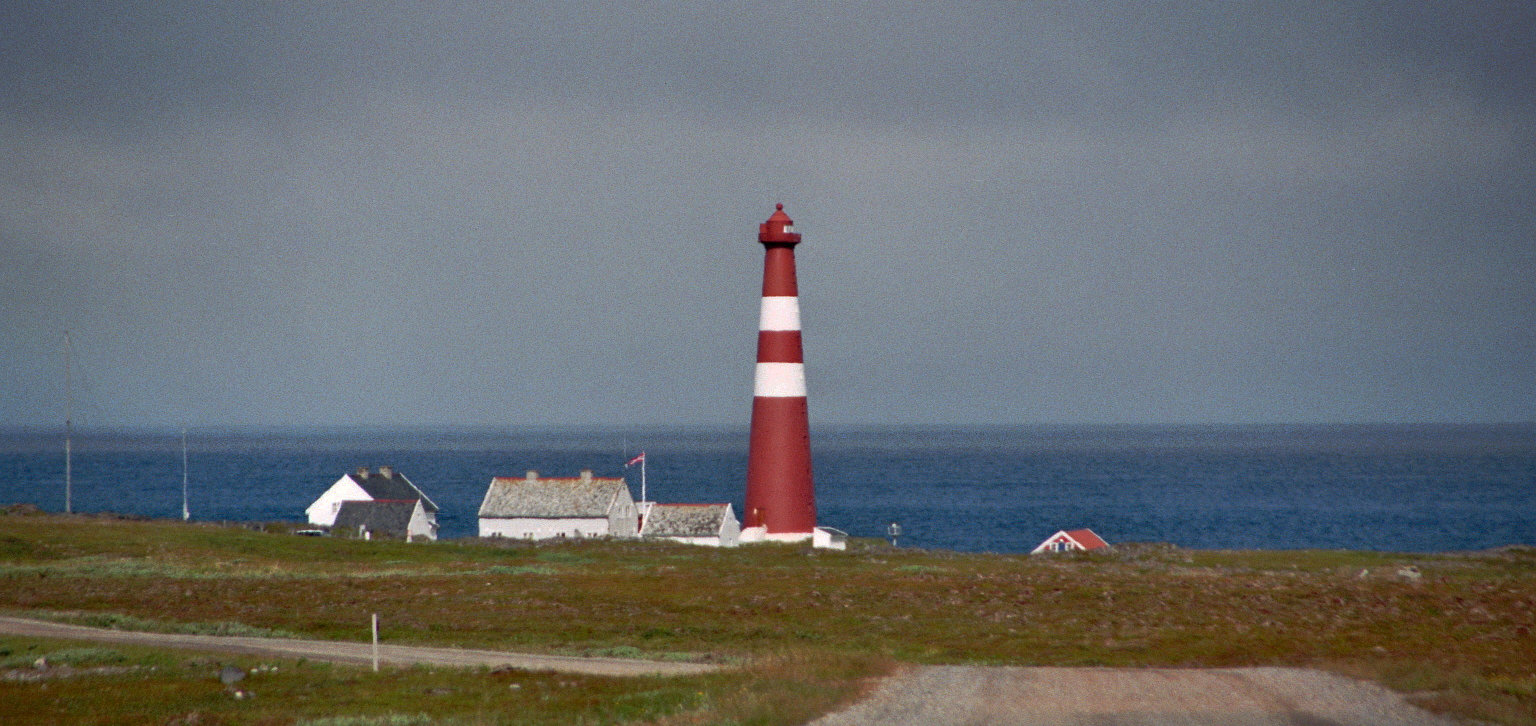
View of Slettnes Lighthouse on the Nordkinn Peninsula

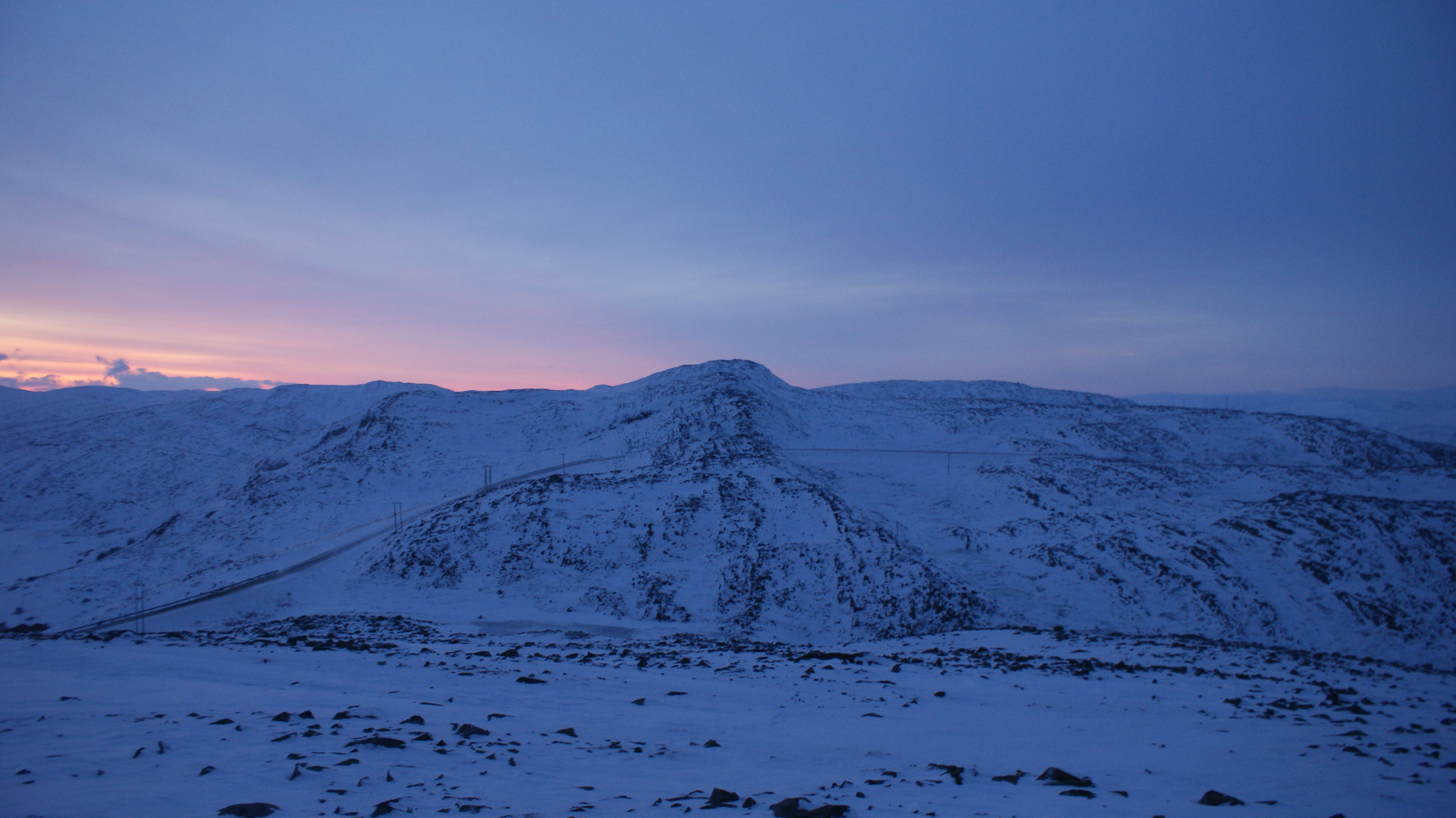
Icebound and windswept tundra of the Nordkinn Peninsula at midday during polar night.

The highest point on Nordkinnhalvøya is Storvarden (486 metres or 1,594 feet) in the Sandfjellet massif. The northernmost point on the peninsula is the Kinnarodden cliff, which is also the northernmost point of mainland Norway and Europe.

The peninsula is connected to the mainland by the 500-metre (1,600 ft) wide Hopseidet isthmus.

The peninsula is situated between the Tanafjorden to the east and the Laksefjorden to the west. They both empty into the Barents Sea.

== Transportation ==
Norwegian County Road 888 connects the villages of Gamvik, Mehamn, and Lebesby to the European route E6 highway at the base of the peninsula, and from there it continues on to the towns of Kirkenes in the east and Alta in the west. The Hurtigruten coastal ship stops in Mehamn and Kjøllefjord, both on this peninsula. Mehamn Airport, with services by Widerøe, is the airport that serves the peninsula and surrounding area.

== Commerce ==
Fishing permits are sold for use on specific rivers on the peninsula including the river Risfjordelva (Northern Sami: Rassavuoles-jokha).
