= Kunes, Finnmark =

Kunes, Finnmark: Kunes (Norwegian); Gussanjárga (Northern Sami)
- Village
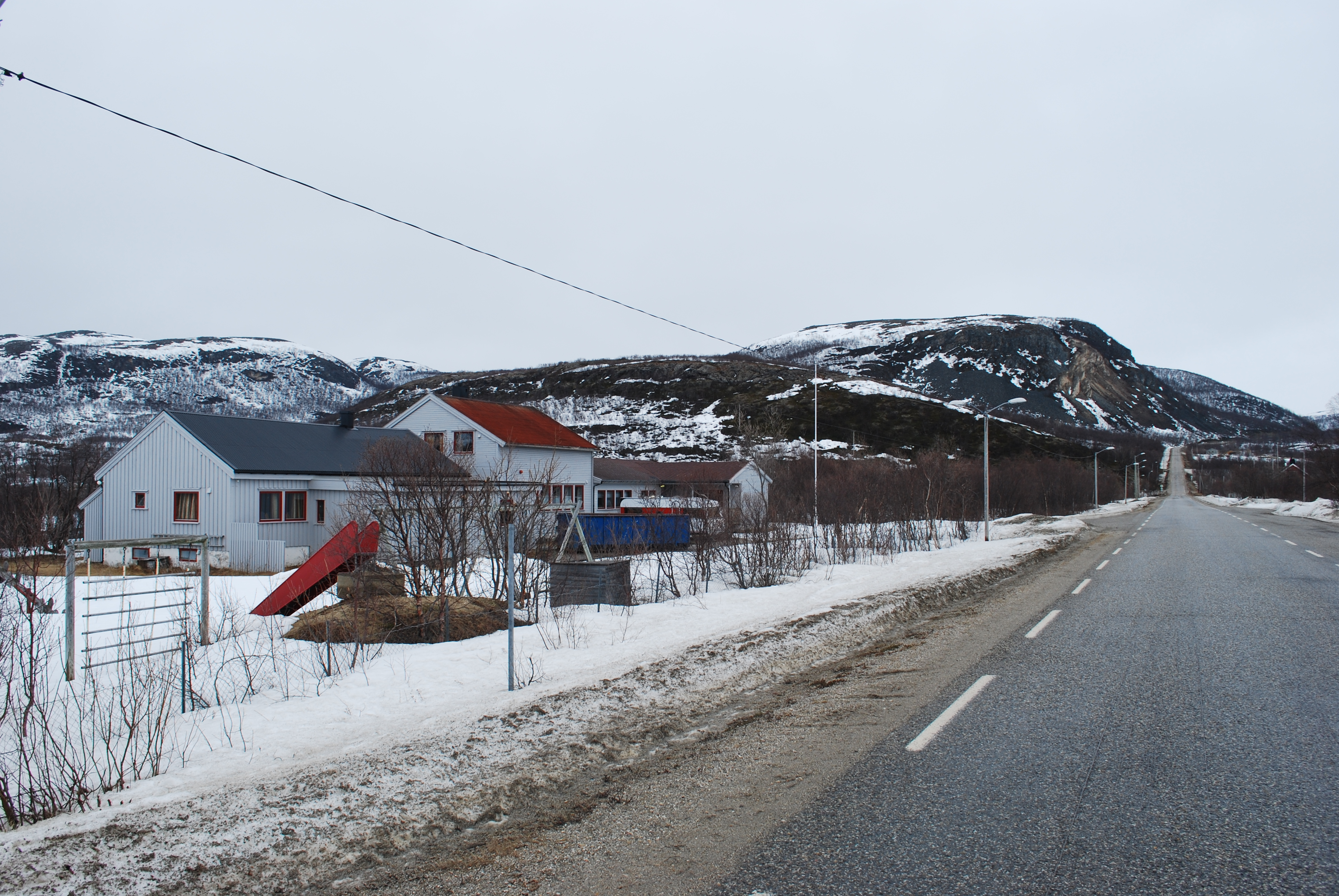
- View of the village
- Interactive map of Kunes, Finnmark
- Location within Finnmark Location within Norway
- Coordinates: 70°21′02″N 26°31′21″E
- Country: Norway
- Region: Northern Norway
- County: Finnmark
- District: Øst-Finnmark
- Municipality: Lebesby Municipality
- Elevation: 16 m (52 ft)
- Time zone: UTC+01:00 (CET)
  - Summer (DST): UTC+02:00 (CEST)
- Post Code: 9742 Kunes

Kunes (Norwegian) or Gussanjárga (Northern Sami) is a village in Lebesby Municipality in Finnmark county, Norway. The small village is located along Norwegian County Road 98, on the shore of the innermost arm of the Laksefjorden. Kunes Chapel is located in this village.

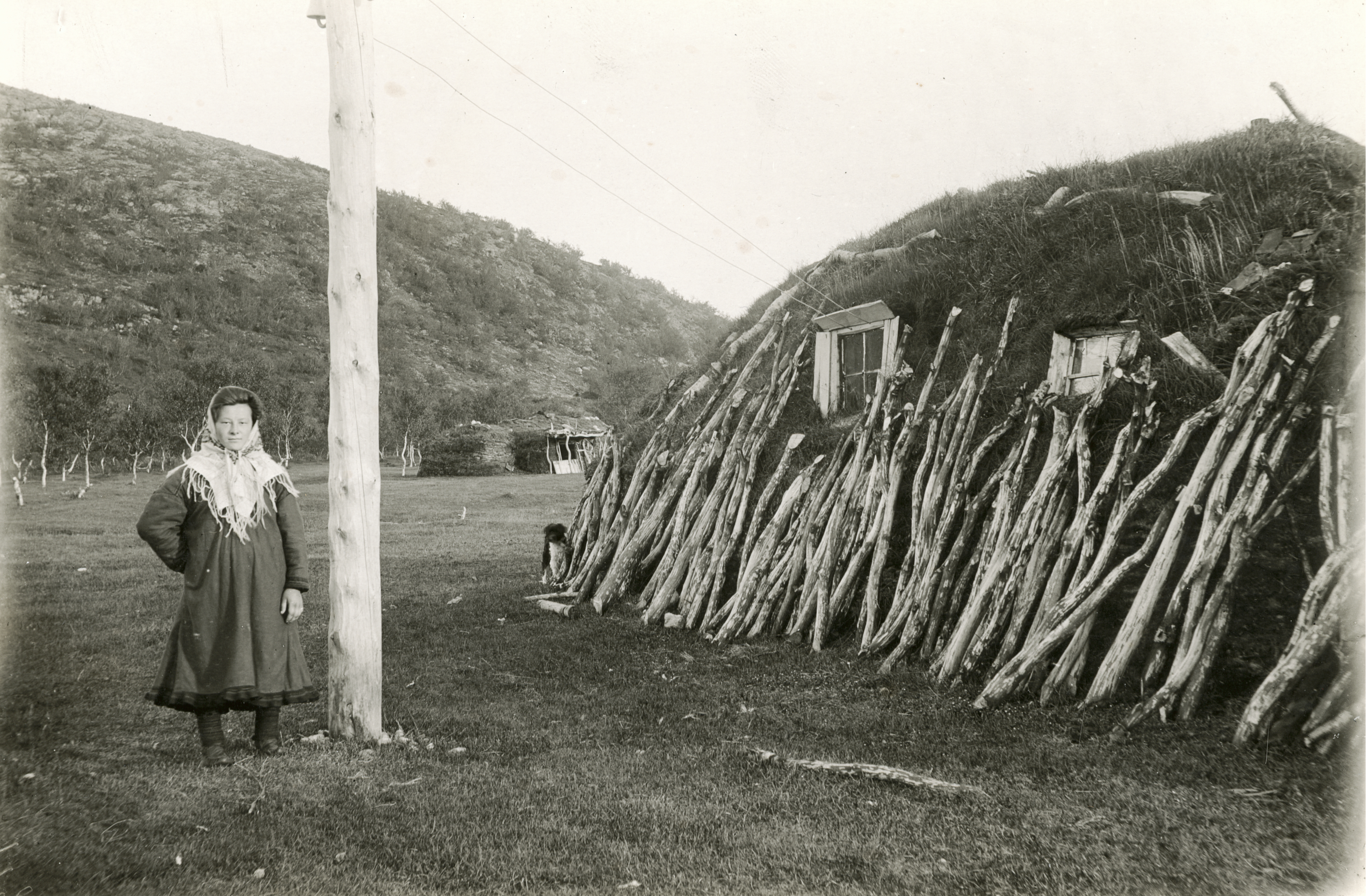
The structure where the telephone switchboard, Kunes telefonsentral was located in 1909.
