= Øst-Finnmark =

District in Finnmark county, Norway

Coordinates: 70.2°N 28.2°E

The pink area in the map is part of the Eastern Finnmark district

East-Finnmark (Norwegian: Øst-Finnmark) is a district in Finnmark county, Norway. Eastern Finnmark covers an area of 18,738 square kilometres (7,235 sq mi) from the border with Russia in the east to the Sværholt Peninsula in the west. The district includes the nine municipalities of Berlevåg, Båtsfjord, Gamvik, Lebesby, Nesseby, Sør-Varanger, Tana, Vadsø, and Vardø. The district includes three towns: Vardø, Vadsø, and Kirkenes. The district includes all of the Varanger Peninsula and Nordkinn Peninsula as well as the areas surrounding the Laksefjorden, Tanafjorden, and Varangerfjorden.
