= Laksefjorden =

Fjord in Finnmark, Norway

Laksefjorden (Norwegian); Lágesvuotna (Northern Sami); Laisvuono (Kven)
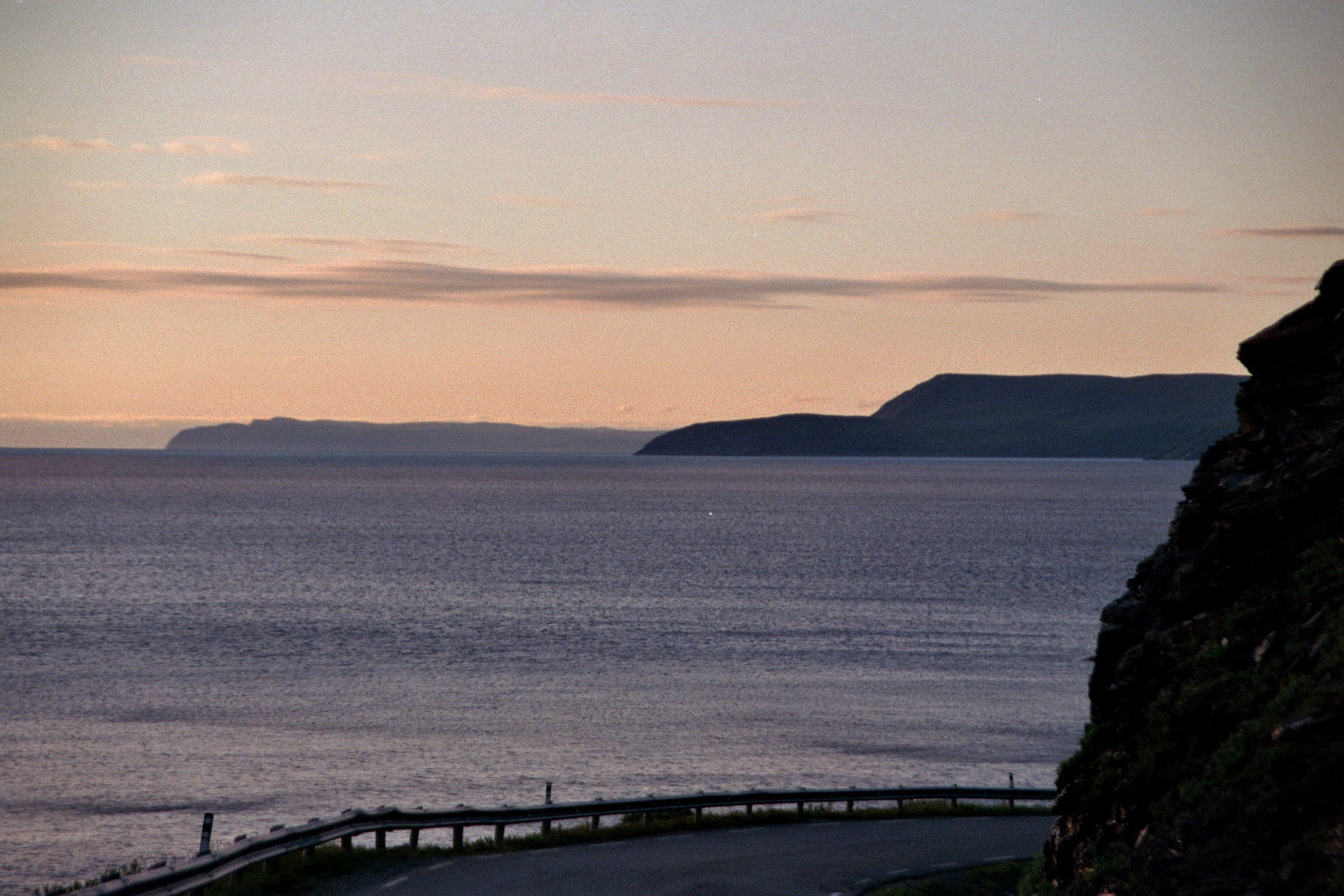
- View of the fjord
- Interactive map of the fjord
- Location: Finnmark county, Norway
- Coordinates: 70.7158°N 26.9013°E
- Type: Fjord
- Basin countries: Norway
- Max. length: 72 kilometres (45 mi)
- Max. width: 30 kilometres (19 mi)

Laksefjorden (Norwegian; lit. 'Salmon fjord'), Lágesvuotna (Northern Sami), or Laisvuono (Kven) is a fjord located entirely in Lebesby Municipality in Finnmark county, Norway. At 72 kilometres (45 mi) long, it is the third-longest fjord in Finnmark county after the Porsangerfjorden and Varangerfjorden. The fjord is situated in a sparsely populated area, with only few and small settlements along the fjord, including Lebesby, Kunes, Ifjord, and Veidnes. The fjord is surrounded by the Sværholt Peninsula to the west and the Nordkinn Peninsula to the east, and it empties to the north into the Barents Sea. Norwegian County Road 888 follows the southern and eastern shoreline of the fjord.

== See also ==
- List of Norwegian fjords
