= Hætta =

Hætta is a Norwegian Sami surname. Notable people with the surname include:

- Aslak Hætta (1824–1854), one of the leaders of the Sami revolt in Guovdageaidnu
- Barbro-Lill Hætta-Jacobsen (born 1972), Norwegian politician
- Edel Hætta Eriksen (1921–2023), Norwegian schoolteacher and politician
- Ella Marie Hætta Isaksen (born 1998), Sami musician from Tana, Norway
- Ellen Inga O. Hætta (born 1953), Norwegian Sámi politician
- Lars Hætta (1834–1896), Norwegian Sami reindeer herder, prisoner, wood carver and Bible translator
- Mattis Hætta (1959–2022), Norwegian Sami singer and recording artist
