= Stuorajávri =

Stuorajávri may refer to the following locations:

- Stuorajávri (Alta), a lake in Alta municipality, Finnmark county, Norway
- Storvatnet (Balsfjord) (also known as Stuorajávri), a lake in Balsfjord municipality, Troms county, Norway
- Stuorajávri (Kautokeino), a lake in Kautokeino municipality, Finnmark county, Norway
