= Stuora Galbajávri =

Lake in Kautokeino, Norway

- Interactive map of the lake
- Location: Kautokeino, Finnmark
- Coordinates: 69.167°N 24.126°E
- Basin countries: Norway
- Max. length: 4.7 kilometres (2.9 mi)
- Max. width: 2 kilometres (1.2 mi)
- Surface area: 5.18 km^{2} (2.00 sq mi)
- Shore length^{1}: 16.94 kilometres (10.53 mi)
- Surface elevation: 422 metres (1,385 ft)
- References: NVE
- ^{1} Shore length is not a well-defined measure.

Stuora Galbajávri is a lake in Kautokeino Municipality in Finnmark county, Norway. The 5.18-square-kilometre (2.00 sq mi) lake lies on the Finnmarksvidda plateau, about 18 kilometres (11 mi) east of the village of Láhpoluoppal.

== See also ==
- List of lakes in Norway
