= Ailo Gaup =

Ailo Gaup may refer to:

- Ailo Gaup (author) (1944–2014), Sámi author and shaman
- Ailo Gaup (motocross rider) (born 1979), a motocross rider who invented the Underflip
- Ingor Ánte Áilo Gaup (or Iŋgor Ántte Áilu Gaup) (born 1960), Sámi actor, composer, and folk musician
