= Unni Turrettini =

Norwegian author, lawyer, international speaker, and human connection expert

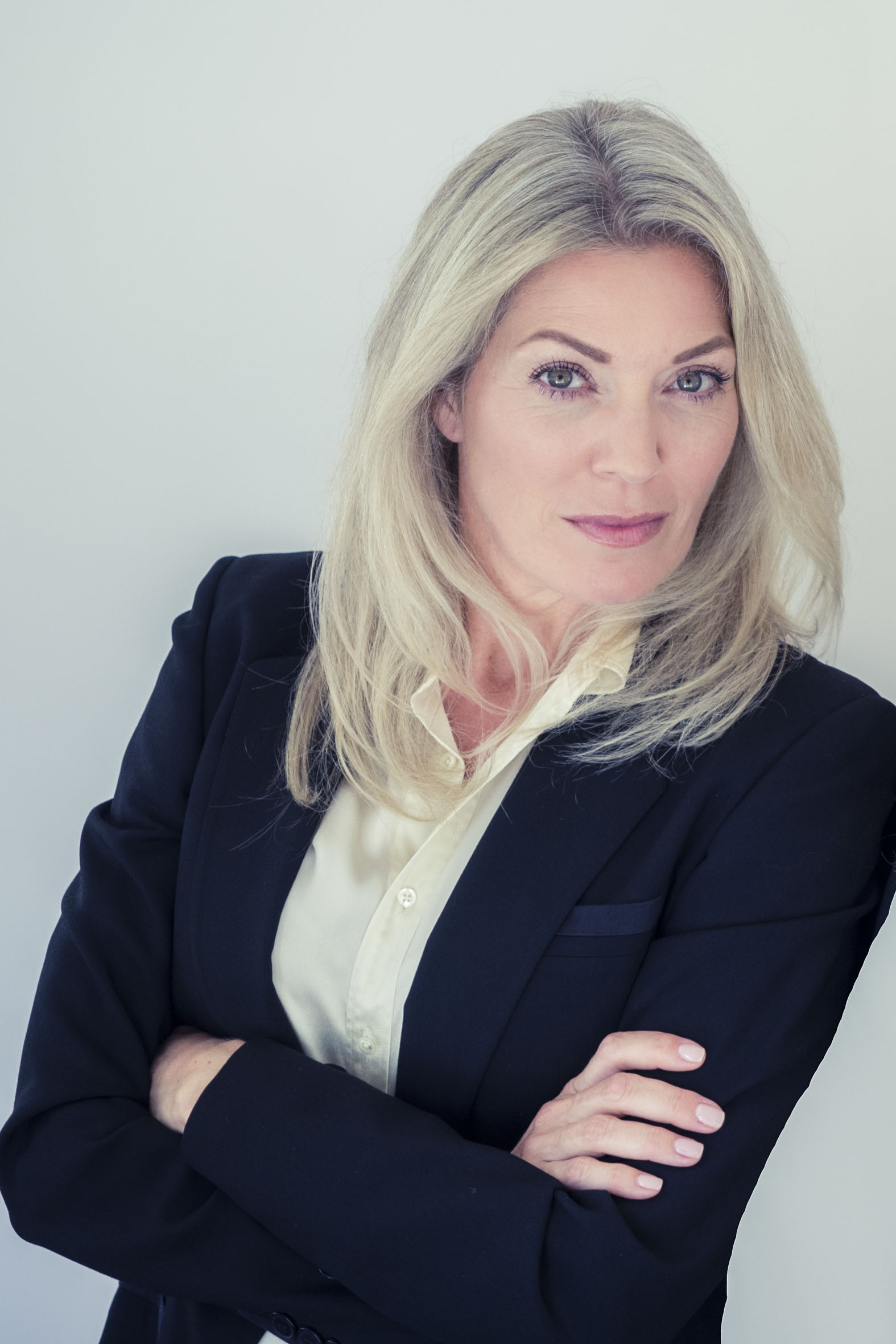
- Born: Unni Fredheim; July 8, 1972 (age 54); Kautokeino, Norway
- Occupations: Novelist, author, public speaker, human connection expert
- Spouse: Samuel Turrettini
- Writing career
- Period: 1990–present
- Genre: nonfiction
- Website: unniturrettini.com

Unni Turrettini (born Unni Fredheim; July 8, 1972) is a writer, lawyer, citizen activist, international speaker and human connection expert. She was born in Kautokeino Municipality in Finnmark county, Norway.

Her first book The Mystery of the Lone Wolf Killer: Anders Behring Breivik and the Threat of Terror in Plain Sight, published on November 15, 2015, is the story of Anders Behring Breivik and the Norway Massacre on July 22, 2011. The Mystery of the Lone Wolf Killer is an Amazon best seller and won the Silver Falchion Award for best adult non-fiction in 2016.

She is also co-author of Once Upon a Fact, a collection of short-fiction stories inspired by famous fairytales.

Turrettini's book Betraying the Nobel: The Secrets and Corruption Behind the Nobel Peace Prize was published on November 3, 2020.

== Life and career ==
Turrettini was born and raised in Norway. She graduated high school as an AFS exchange student at Shawnee Mission South High School, a suburb of Kansas City, Kansas, in 1989–1990, as well as from Drammen Gymnas, Norway in 1992. She holds a Cand. jur. Degree in law from the University of Oslo Law Faculty (1999) and has an LL.M. in American Law from Boston University School of Law. She is also a member of The New York Bar. She worked as a lawyer in Paris, France from 1999 to 2004 and in finance in Geneva, Switzerland from 2005 to 2008.

After Anders Behring Breivik killed 77 and injured hundreds more in Norway in 2011, Turrettini started researching the massacre in search of a sense of understanding. Part of her research involved speaking with experts, including former FBI Special Agent Kathleen M. Puckett who was involved in the investigation that lead to the capture of Ted Kaczynski, the so-called Unabomber, in 1995.

Turrettini has participated in several TEDx Talk events, including TEDx Institut Le Rosey and TEDx Youngstown. Other presentations by Turrettini include talks at the Occidental College Mckinnon Center for Global Affairs, the University of California, Berkeley and The American-Scandinavian Foundation's Scandinavia House headquarters in New York City. She was featured on KMPH-TV Fox News in Fresno, California discussing her book The Mystery of the Lone Wolf Killer. On November 11, 2020, C-SPAN broadcast a segment with Turrettini that examined the Nobel Peace Prize election committee and history from her perspective, with information from her book Betraying the Nobel.

== Bibliography ==
- Unni Turrettini and Kathleen M. Puckett. The Mystery of the Lone Wolf Killer: Anders Behring Breivik and the Threat of Terror in Plain Sight. New York: Pegasus Books, 2015. ISBN 9781605989105
- Katherine Tomlinson, co-authored by Unni Turrettini. Once Upon a Fact. Wildside Press, May 25, 2018. ISBN 978-1479438310
- Unni Turrettini. Betraying the Nobel: The Secrets and Corruption Behind the Nobel Peace Prize. New York: Pegasus Books, 2020. ISBN 9781643135649
