= Virdnejávri =

Lake in Kautokeino, Norway

- Interactive map of the lake
- Location: Kautokeino, Finnmark
- Coordinates: 69.622°N 23.774°E
- Basin countries: Norway
- Max. length: 11 kilometres (6.8 mi)
- Max. width: 900 metres (3,000 ft)
- Surface area: 5.39 km^{2} (2.08 sq mi)
- Shore length^{1}: 23.84 kilometres (14.81 mi)
- Surface elevation: 250 metres (820 ft)
- References: NVE
- ^{1} Shore length is not a well-defined measure.

Virdnejávri is a lake in Kautokeino Municipality in Finnmark county, Norway. The 5.39-square-kilometre (2.08 sq mi) lake is a man-made lake located on the river Kautokeinoelva which flows over the Finnmarksvidda plateau. The dam at the northern end is part of the Alta Hydroelectric Power Station.

== See also ==
- List of lakes in Norway
