= Gahččanjávri =

Lake in Kautokeino, Norway

- Interactive map of the lake
- Location: Finnmark
- Coordinates: 69.5931°N 23.1308°E
- Basin countries: Norway
- Max. length: 3.4 kilometres (2.1 mi)
- Max. width: 2 kilometres (1.2 mi)
- Surface area: 4.71 km^{2} (1.82 sq mi)
- Shore length^{1}: 10.9 kilometres (6.8 mi)
- Surface elevation: 567 metres (1,860 ft)
- References: NVE
- ^{1} Shore length is not a well-defined measure.

Gahččanjávri is a lake in Guovdageainnu Municipality in Finnmark county, Norway. The 4.72-square-kilometre (1.82 sq mi) lake lies on the Finnmarksvidda plateau, about 25 kilometres (16 mi) northwest of the village of Masi.

== See also ==
- List of lakes in Norway
