= Láhpojávri =

Lake in Kautokeino, Norway

- Interactive map of the lake
- Location: Kautokeino, Finnmark
- Coordinates: 69.2413°N 23.7664°E
- Basin countries: Norway
- Max. length: 11 kilometres (6.8 mi)
- Max. width: 1.8 kilometres (1.1 mi)
- Surface area: 8.17 km^{2} (3.15 sq mi)
- Shore length^{1}: 43.77 kilometres (27.20 mi)
- Surface elevation: 327 metres (1,073 ft)
- References: NVE
- ^{1} Shore length is not a well-defined measure.

Láhpojávri is a lake in Kautokeino Municipality in Finnmark county, Norway. The 8.17-square-kilometre (3.15 sq mi) lake lies on the Finnmarksvidda plateau, the village of Láhpoluoppal lies on the southern tip of the lake.

== See also ==
- List of lakes in Norway
