= Kautokeino Municipality =

Municipality in Finnmark, Norway

Kautokeino Municipality Kautokeino kommune Guovdageainnu suohkan
- Municipality
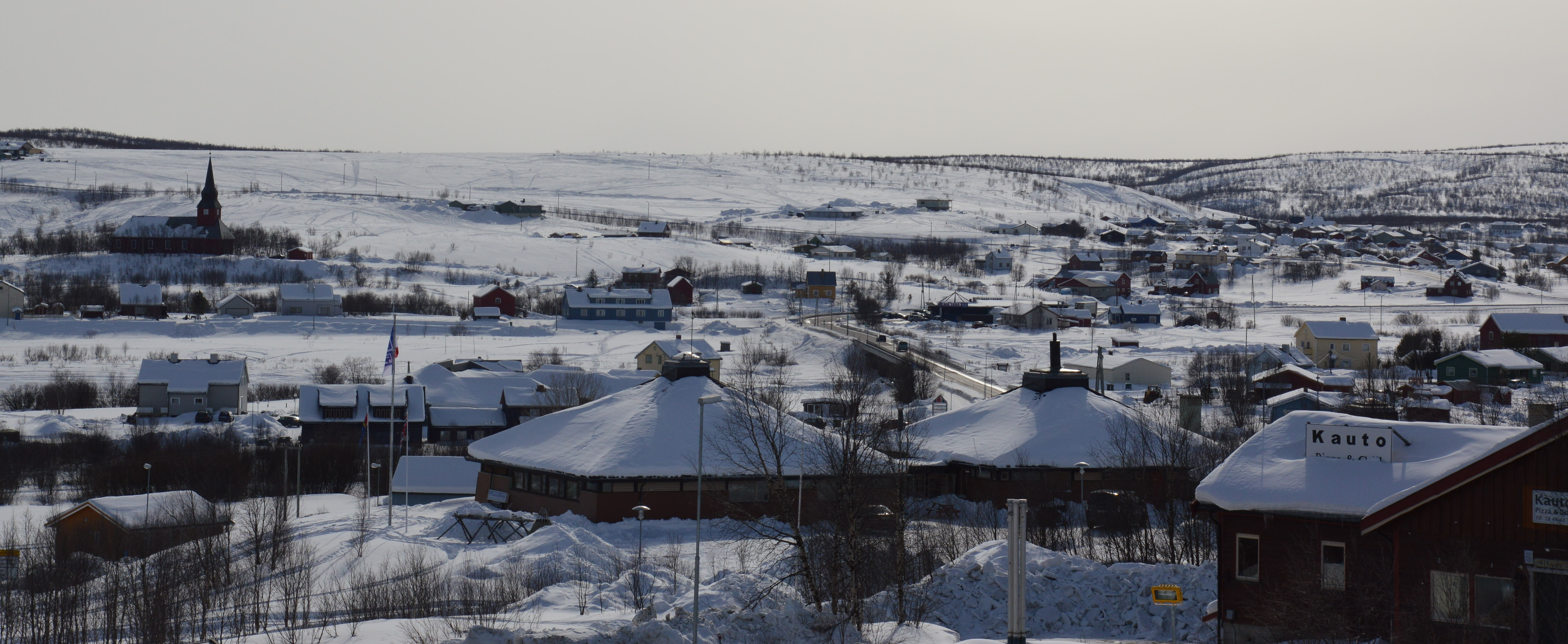

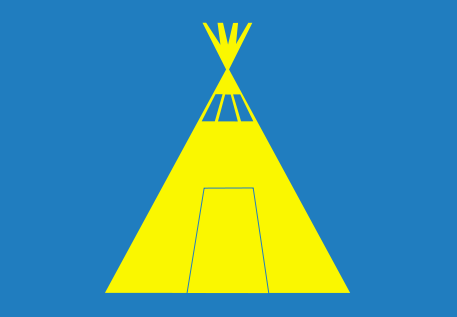
- Flag Coat of arms

- Finnmark within Norway

- Kautokeino within Finnmark
- Coordinates: 69°00′42″N 23°02′36″E
- Country: Norway
- County: Finnmark
- Established: 1851
  - Preceded by: Kistrand Municipality
- Administrative centre: Kautokeino

Government
  - Mayor (2023): Anders S. Buljo (LL)

Area
  - Total: 9,707.35 km^{2} (3,748.03 sq mi)
  - Land: 8,967.38 km^{2} (3,462.32 sq mi)
  - Water: 739.97 km^{2} (285.70 sq mi) 7.6%
  - Rank: #1 in Norway
- Highest elevation: 973.9 m (3,195 ft)

Population (2024)
  - Total: 2,848
  - Rank: #236 in Norway
  - Density: 0.3/km^{2} (0.78/sq mi)
  - Change (10 years): ▼ −2.8%
- Demonym: Kautokeinoværing

Official languages
  - Norwegian form: Bokmål
  - Sámi form: Northern Sami
- Time zone: UTC+01:00 (CET)
  - Summer (DST): UTC+02:00 (CEST)
- ISO 3166 code: NO-5612
- Website: Official website

Kautokeino (Norwegian: Kautokeino; Northern Sami: Guovdageaidnu [ˈkuo̯vːtaˌkea̯jːtnuː]; Kven: Koutokeino; Finnish: Koutokeino) is a municipality in Finnmark county, Norway. The administrative centre of the municipality is the village of Guovdageaidnu/Kautokeino. Other villages include Láhpoluoppal and Máze.

The 9,707-square-kilometre (3,748 sq mi) municipality is the largest by area out of the 357 municipalities in Norway. Kautokeino is the 236th most populous municipality in Norway with a population of 2,848. The municipality's population density is 0.3 inhabitants per square kilometre (0.78/sq mi) and its population has decreased by 2.8% over the previous 10-year period.

Guovdageainnu Municipality (Kautokeino) is one of two cultural centers of Northern Sápmi today (the other being the neighboring Kárášjoga Municipality). The most significant industries are reindeer herding, theatre/movie industry, and the public education system. Kautokeino is one of the coldest places in the Nordics.

== General information ==
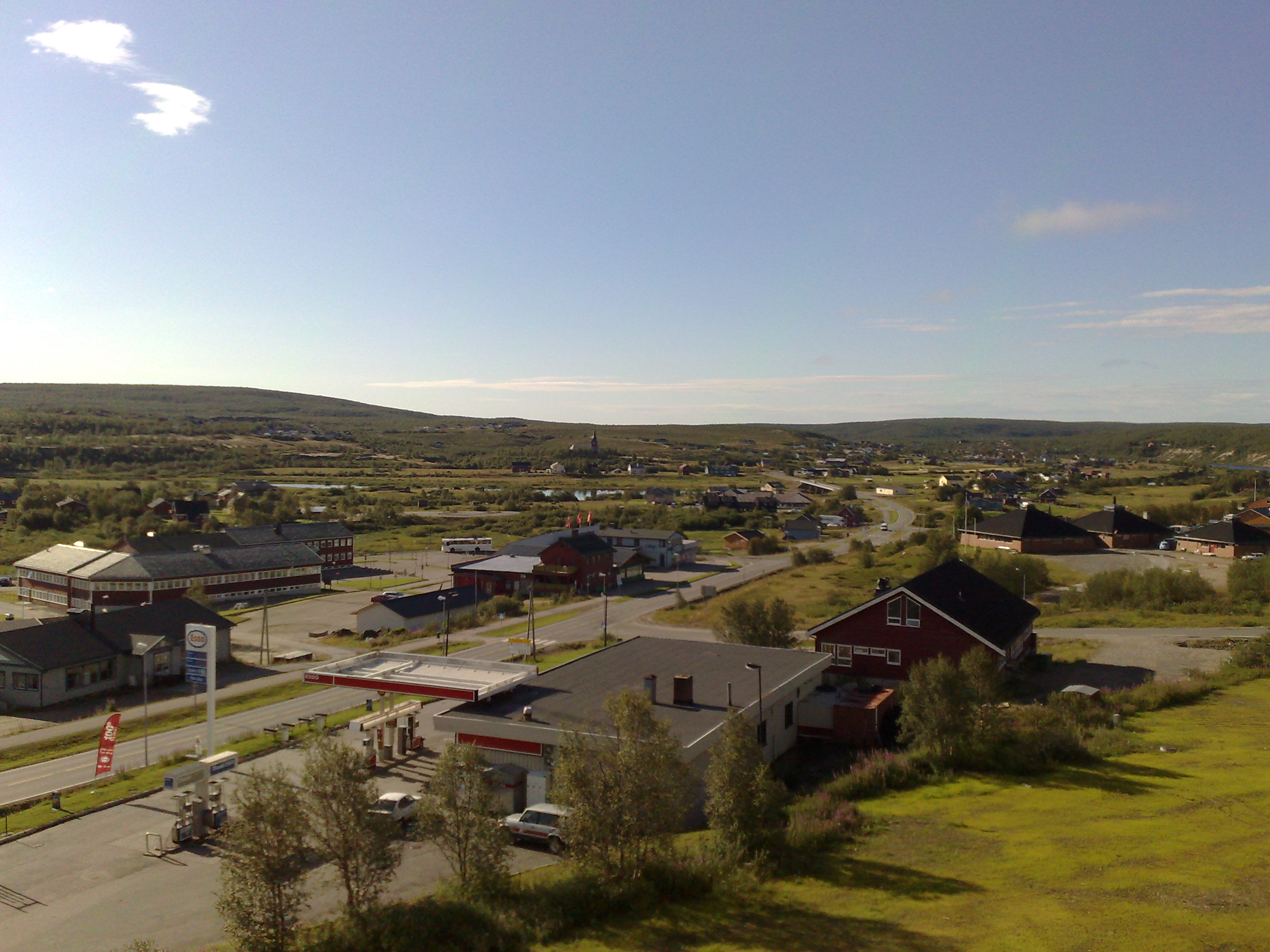
View of the village of Kautokeino

The municipality of Kautokeino was established in 1851 when the large Kistrand Municipality was divided in two: the southern part became Kautokeino Municipality and the northern part remained as Kistrand Municipality. Initially, there were 869 residents in the new municipality. The municipal boundaries have not changed since that time.

On 1 January 2020, the municipality became part of the newly formed Troms og Finnmark county. Previously, it had been part of the old Finnmark county. On 1 January 2024, the Troms og Finnmark county was divided and the municipality once again became part of Finnmark county.

=== Name ===
The first element in Guovdageaidnu is guovda which means "middle" or "half". The last element is geaidnu which means "road" or "way". Combined it means "half way", since the location is halfway between two traditional migrating points. It is also the geographic centre of Northern Sápmi. Kautokeino is a Finnicized form of the Sámi name Guovdageaidnu, and it is also adopted by the Norwegians.

The official name of the municipality was Kautokeino until 1987 when it was changed to the bilingual Guovdageaidnu-Kautokeino. It was the first municipality in Norway to get a Sami language name. In 2005, the name was again changed, such that either Guovdageaidnu or Kautokeino can be used interchangeably. The spelling of the Sami language name changes depending on how it is used. It is called Guovdageaidnu when it is spelled alone, but it is Guovdageainnu suohkan when using the Sami language equivalent to "Kautokeino Municipality".

=== Coat of arms ===
The coat of arms was granted on 4 September 1987. The official blazon is "Azure, a lavvo Or" (Norwegian: I blått en gul lavvo). This means the arms have a blue field (background) and the charge is a lavvo (also spelled lavvu). The lavvo has a tincture of Or which means it is commonly colored yellow, but if it is made out of metal, then gold is used. The lavvu (often spelled as 'lavvo') is still in use by reindeer herders who follow their herds according to the season and food availability of food for the animals, and so it was chosen as the symbol for the municipality. The arms were designed by Arvid Sveen.

== History ==
=== The ice age ===
The area where the Kautokeino settlement is located became ice-free approximately 10,500 years ago after the last Ice age. The northern part of today's Kautokeino municipality became ice-free first, approximately 500–800 years before the area where the settlement of Kautokeino is located today. The ice edge retreated south before disappearing completely from Fennoscandia 9,600 years ago, most recently in Sarek in Sweden.

=== The Stone Age ===
In Kautokeino there are traces of human activity stretching back 7,000–9,000 years. The people entering the Kautokeino area when the ice retreated has belonged to one of the three main genetic groups in the postglacial period of early Europe; Eastern Hunter-Gatherers, Western Hunter-Gatherers or the Scandinavian Hunter-Gatherers. At Kautokeino church, arrowheads have been found where the dating extends over a large period of time. The oldest arrowheads date to 5000–7000 BC, while the youngest date to 1000–0 BC. In 2020, the University of Tromsø conducted archaeological excavations at Gáidnomanjávri I Kautokeino, approximately 300 meters northeast of the church. There, among other things, burnt bone remains were found, the oldest of which were dated to 4846–5009 BC.

In Juntevađđa, about 10 kilometers north of Kautokeino, archaeological excavations were carried out in 2018. The results from the samples show that there has been human activity in the area which has been dated back to 5560–5520 BC, mesolithic period. Among other things, bone remains of reindeer were identified.

=== The Iron Age ===
Junttevađđa has traces of human activity spanning a long period of time. In 1967, the archaeologist Povl Simonsen excavated at Junttevađđa, where he uncovered a total of 10 stone piles that lay in a row at intervals of between 5 and 13 metres. He found layers of charcoal in the stone piles, and thought these were fire pits. These stone piles are dated to approximately AD 1050. However, later research has concluded that it is not fire pits, but solid hearths associated with tent settlements that have been used by the Sami population.

=== 1550–1751 ===
Until 1751, Kautokeino was part of Sweden.

In 1695, Kautokeino was part of a [common district,] fellesdistriktet, which consisted of Kautokeino and Ávjovárre. The same year, the size of the population of fellesdistriktet was recorded as 36 families (recorded by the census performed by tax authorities, and that has later been estimated to likely indicate around 150–200 persons in fellesdistriktet).

From 1553, Gustav Vasa's bailiffs began systematic taxation of the Sami in the Kautokeino area. There are tax lists from 1553 to 1608, except for the year 1565. In addition, there is an overview of the population and accounting list for 1553. Peter Lorenz Smith writes in the book Kautokeino og Kautokeino lappene: a historical and ergological regional study from 1938 that the "lapp village" in Kautokeino had 8 people in the tax man count in 1553. Today, the term siida is used for what Smith called "lapp village". He further estimates the total population of the Kautokeino siida to 48 people based on an assumption of 6 people per household. In the Swedish tax accounts from 1553, Kautokeino is called the town of Kwothekyla. Smith believes it may be a combination of the words goahti (Sami for a large tent) and kylla(sic) (kylä, Finnish for hamlet). The siida was located on Goahtedievva, which is near today's Kautokeino church. Findings from the Stone Age to our time show that the area has been influenced by human activity for 9,000 years.

In addition to the siida in Kautokeino, there was also a siida at Lahpojávri within today's Kautokeino municipality. In 1553 there were 6 people in the tax census and with Smith's assumption of 6 people per household a population of 36 people.

The first priest to hold a service in Kautokeino was Johannes Torneaus from Övertorneå. This happened in 1641. The service was held in a small log cabin that had just been set up. It is said to have been Kautokeino's first wooden building. Today, the rest of this log cabin is preserved in the Kautokeino museum.

The first resident priest was Swedish Amund Isaksen Curtelius. He wintered in Masi from 1674 to 1675. He was succeeded by Johan Tornberg. In 1682 he was again succeeded by his brother, Anders Nicolai Tornensis. Tornensis had a vicarage built in Kautokeino, and started construction of Kautokeino's old church in 1701. The church was consecrated on 11 February 1703, and was named "St. Charles' Church". The old Kautokeino church was consecrated as a church for 241 years and 296 days before it was burned down by the German occupation forces on 3 December 1944, and was then Finnmark's oldest Protestant church.

There is little written source material about Kautokeino from before around 1550.

=== 1752–1940 ===
In 1752, church herder Johan Björkman was registered as the only permanent resident in Kautokeino. By 1756, it was reported that there were three permanent resident families at the church site: Matz Hinderson Hetta and his family, bell-ringer Michel Andersson Kemi and his family, and Oluf Andersson Tornensis and his family. The reindeer herding Sami around Kautokeino led a nomadic existence, following the migrations of the reindeer. P.L Smith estimates in the book "Kautokeino og Kautokeino lappene" that the population in the area covering today's Kautokeino municipality was 481 people in 1754, based on church records, which he considers to be a fairly accurate census shortly after Kautokeino became part of Norway following the border drawing in 1751.

In 1845, measurements were made for Struve Geodetic Arc at the mountain tops of Lodiken (Luvdiidcohkka) and Bealjasvarri in Kautokeino.

==== Russia bans reindeer migration across the border to Finland ====
Major Emigration from Kautokeino In 1852, the border to Finland was closed to reindeer migration. This led to a significant number of reindeer herding Sami moving from Kautokeino, with a particularly large emigration to Karesuando, but many also moved to Skjervøy Municipality. P.L Smith writes in the book Kautokeino og Kautokeino lappene that 310 people moved from Kautokeino to Karesuando and Skjervøy between 1852 and 1889, taking with them approximately 25 to 30 thousand reindeer. It is estimated that about 60 people later moved back to Kautokeino.

In 1852, Kautokeino was the site of a Sami uprising against representatives of the Norwegian authorities. This was one of the few violent reactions by the Sami against the exploitation policies of the Norwegian government and was the only known confrontation between Samis and Norwegians with loss of human lives.

==== The first emigration to Alaska in 1894 ====
On April 10, 1894, 19 people left Kautokeino for Alaska, consisting of 6 families and 1 bachelor. The journey was organized by Willian A Kjellmann from Talvik on behalf of Sheldon Jackson in Alaska. Sheldon Jackson's purpose was to use the Sami's expertise in reindeer herding to teach this knowledge to the Inuit in Alaska. The names of those who left from Kautokeino are listed below, organized by families: Per Aslaksen Rist and his wife Berit Anne Andersdatter Spein with their daughters Marit and Inger. Johan Speinsen Tornensis, his wife Marit Grete Salomonsdatter Näkkäläjärvi, and their daughter Marit. Mikkel Josefsen Näkkälä and his wife Berit Anne Klemetsdatter Hætta. Samuel Johnsen Kemi, his wife Kirsten Persdatter Bals, and their children Samuel and Karen. Mathis Aslaksen Eira, his wife Berit Johannsedatter Hætta, and their son Aslak. Aslak Larsen Somby and his wife Brita Olsdatter Nango. Bachelor Fredrik Larsen.

==== The 1898 Manitoba Journey ====
Departing from Alta on February 4, 1898, the vessel Manitoba set sail for New York. It carried 539 reindeer and 113 passengers, including 44 individuals from Kautokeino, all part of the Manitoba Journey. This expedition aimed to avert starvation among Klondike gold miners by moving reindeer from Finnmark to the Klondike. Additionally, it sought to establish reindeer farming in Alaska as a means to provide a consistent food source for Alaskans.

==== Population figures in 1900 ====
The year 1900 saw Kautokeino home to 267 settled Sami individuals and 522 Sami engaged in reindeer herding, making up a total population of 789. In total, 63 people traveled to Alaska from Kautokeino in 1894 and 1898. Relative to the population in 1900, 63 people would have constituted about 7% of the population in 1900. Some of those who traveled in 1894 and 1898 later returned to Kautokeino, so the number does not precisely indicate the proportion of the population in Kautokeino that emigrated to America permanently.

==== Referendum on the dissolution of the union in 1905 ====
In Kautokeino, 100% of those who voted in the referendum were in favour of Norway being a kingdom after the dissolution of the union with Sweden. Kautokeino was one of 2 municipalities in Norway where 100% voted for the kingdom.

==== Reindeer Herding Project in Newfoundland 1908–1910 ====
On 14 December 1907, the ship Anita departed from Alta bound for Newfoundland in America. Onboard were two families from Masi in Kautokeino, a married couple from Kvalsund, and 300 reindeer. In 1909, another family from Masi joined them. The purpose of the journey was to introduce reindeer herding in Newfoundland. A total of 12 individuals from Masi made the trip in 1908 and 1909. The project concluded in 1910, and the families returned to Masi. A child was born in Newfoundland, so in total, 13 people returned to Masi in 1910.

==== The Otto von Rosen affair ====
Between 15 and 20 January 1917, the Swedish Baron Otto von Rosen was arrested in what is now the Kautokeino municipality or in today's Karasjok municipality, near the border with Finland. He was suspected of espionage. He was sent to Kristiania (now Oslo) and released in February 1917 without conviction but expelled to Sweden. It turned out that when his luggage was searched, it contained spy equipment and a sugar cube containing anthrax bacteria. This was confirmed by analysis 80 years later. Otto von Rosen had been mentioned in newspapers for suspicious activity in the Karesuando area earlier in January, and was then suspected of being a German spy. Finland in 1917 was part of the Russian Empire and at war with Germany. The distance between Karesuando and Kautokeino is approximately 70 kilometers in a straight line.

==== The Spanish flu 1919 ====
Kautokeino was severely affected by a wave of the Spanish flu in January 1919; that month, 24 people died in the municipality, corresponding to 2.2% of the population. In 1920, Kautokeino had a population of 979 people.

==== Telephone to Kautokeino ====
Kautokeino was connected to the country's telephone network in October 1919 when the telephone line to Alta was completed.

==== Reindeer herding project in Baffin Island, 1921–1923 ====
In 1921, 3 families from Masi and 1 bachelor from Kautokeino were recruited for a reindeer herding project in Baffin Island, Canada, under the auspices of the Hudson Bay Company. The group, consisting of 13 people and 600-700 reindeer, departed from Alta on 19 October 1921, aboard the ship Nascobie. Their destination was Amadjuak Bay on Baffin Island, and the purpose of this reindeer herding project was the same as previous ones involving reindeer in America, namely to introduce domestic reindeer herding and thus ensure a stable food supply for the residents. The project concluded in 1923, and all participants returned home to Masi and Kautokeino.

==== Reindeer herding project at the mouth of the Mackenzie River from 1931 ====
3 families from Kautokeino traveled to the northern coast of Canada, to the area where the Mackenzie River flows into the sea, near the present-day town of Inuvik, which was founded later in 1953. The group totaled 10 people. The purpose of this project, too, was to introduce reindeer herding and secure a stable food supply for the local population. Two of the families returned to Kautokeino after 5 and 7 years, while one family remained in Canada, and their descendants continued reindeer herding in the area until recently. The reindeer were sourced from Alaska, and the chief herder who led the reindeer from Alaska to the mouth of the Mackenzie River was Anders Bær, born in the mountains between Kautokeino Municipality and Karasjok Municipality, with a father from Kautokeino. He had emigrated to Alaska in 1898. The journey from Alaska to the mouth of the Mackenzie River took 5 years, from 1929 to 1935. Anders Bær earned the nickname "the Arctic Moses" after leading the reindeer to Canada.

==== Crown Prince couple visits Kautokeino ====
On Tuesday, 27 March 1934, Crown Prince Olav and Crown Princess Märtha arrived in Kautokeino. The Crown Prince couple stayed in Kautokeino until Thursday, 29 March (Maundy Thursday), before continuing to Karasjok. In Kautokeino, the royal couple was greeted by 80 children who sang three songs in Sami to honor their arrival. On Maundy Thursday, the Crown Prince couple attended a service at Kautokeino Old Church from 1701 before departing further to Karasjok.

==== Nomadic life ====
Adolf Steen writes in his book Kautokeino Studies that in the 1930s there was one winter house in the eastern mountains, which means that the vast majority of reindeer-herding Sami still lived in lavvu (traditional Sami tents) and gamme (turf huts) all year round.

=== World War II ===
==== 1940–1943 ====
During the war at the Narvik front in the spring of 1940, at least four soldiers from Kautokeino took part; they belonged to the Alta Battalion.

In August 1940, four German soldiers came to Kautokeino by riverboat; they were the first German soldiers on the scene. They traveled again, and there was no permanent German presence in Kautokeino until the winter of 1941. Then they requisitioned the boarding school for accommodation.

A Serbian prisoner of war named Bora Ivankovic was arrested by the Germans in autumn 1942 and executed in Kautokeino. Together with Petar Filipovic, he had managed to escape from the prison camp in Karasjok. After 28 days on the run, Petar Filipovic managed to get into Sweden.

In 1942, the Germans planned to build a railway line through Kautokeino municipality. The line was to go via Reisadalen to Kautokeino and on to Karasjok. The railway was part of the German Polar Railway, which was planned to run all the way from Fauske to Kirkenes. The plan was stated in 1943.

In 1943, the Germans built a field airport with a runway of 1,200 meters in Kautokeino. At the end of the runway there is still the wreckage of a German Junkers Ju 52.

==== 1944 ====
The Sámi author Odd Mathis Hætta writes in the book Samebygder på Finnmarksvidda 2 about 3 Serbian prisoners who had escaped from a prison camp and who were surprised and taken by the Germans and executed. This happened at Áidejávri, 30 kilometers south of Kautokeino in August 1944. The bodies were dug up and transported to Kautokeino by Norwegian soldiers in the spring of 1945. It is likely that they were not Serbian prisoners but from another nationality, this since the Serbian prisoners were held captive in Karasjok from 23 July 1942 to 15 December 1942, and this incident happened two years later.

A German Focke-Wulf Fw 189 reconnaissance aircraft made an emergency landing on 15 October 1944 at Flyvarjávri 13 kilometers south of Kautokeino. The water was named Flyvarjávri as a result of the accident, which means "plane lake" in Sámi.

In the autumn of 1944, the German 139th Mountain Brigade was stationed in and around Kautokeino. The force consisted of approximately 5,000 soldiers and had arrived in the Kautokeino area no later than 29 October 1944. The 139th Mountain Brigade was formed on 5 June 1944 from the remnants of the 139th Mountain Regiment from the 3rd Mountain Division. The commander of the brigade in the Kautokeino area was Colonel Schirmbacker. He was on loan from the 6th SS Gebirgsjäger division. The 139th Mountain Regiment was the German unit that was about to be defeated by Norwegian forces at Bjørnfjell in June 1940, during the battles of Narvik before Norway had to capitulate when the Allies withdrew. Alta Battalion, where soldiers from Kautokeino also participated, were among the Norwegian units that took part in the battles at Bjørnfjell. The Austrian soldier Toni Russold took part in the battle against the Alta battalion in Narvik in 1940, and was part of the force that made up the flank protection in Kautokeino in the autumn of 1944.

The brigade's mission in Kautokeino in the autumn of 1944 was to form the flank protection for the Sturmbock-Stellung line which ran across the Finnish wedge north of Karesuando. The Germans set up positions in Kautokeino due to concerns about a potential Allied landing at Hammerfest and a subsequent assault through Alta, moving directly south towards Finland across the Finnmarksvidda. Their objective woukld be to intercept the 20th Mountain Army's 18th Army Corps during their retreat from Finland through the Finnish wedge. Additionally, they aimed to prevent Finnish or, in the worst-case scenario, Russian forces from circumventing the Strumbuck-Stellung line in Karesuando, which would allow them to breach the German positions and proceed towards the Lyngen fjord in Norway. South and southwest of Kautokeino, defensive positions were established at Máttavárri, Joppevárri, Áddjit, Gálggovárri and Junkkavárri. The last German soldiers withdrew from the position in Kautokeino on 3 January 1945. The route they followed was a makeshift cart road that went south-west from Kautokeino to Goathteluoppal, on to Hirvas in Finland and finally the road through the Finnish wedge to Skibotn in Norway. In June 2022, shells were found in the area around the German positions from 1944 at Máttavárri, 5 kilometers south of Kautokeino. In the autumn of 1941, only 100 of the 2,000 soldiers were left from the 139th Mountain Regiment of those who had taken part in the campaign in Narvik, in that sense Toni Russold's period in the regiment and the brigade, from the campaign in Narvik all the way to Kautokeino in the autumn of 1944, must have been one of the longest.

On 23 October 1944, a meeting was held in Kautokeino with representatives of the Germans, the Nazi police, police chief Hoem and representatives of Kautokeino municipality. The municipality reached an agreement with the Nazis and the Germans that the population of Kautokeino together with the large herds of reindeer should evacuate to the Helligskogen in Troms and meet the Germans there. The Germans wanted to take control of the reindeer herds because it constituted a large food reserve for the Germans, they wanted to prevent the Allies from getting hold of this food reserve, and because they feared that Soviet Red Army could use driving reindeer for transport, in a similar way to reindeer had been used for transport on the Murmansk front. The agreement was announced to the population in Norwegian. However, the verbal order to the population was given in Sámi and there the population was asked to evacuate to Helligskogen at Anarjohka in the east. Police Chief Hoem was aware that the oral order in Sámi was different from the written order in Norwegian. The population had to leave Kautokeino by 30 November 1944. The result was that the population listened to the oral order in Sámi and failed to evacuate to the Helligskogen in Troms, instead they escaped to the Finnmarksvidda and spread out over a large area. The Germans missed out on the meat reserve that the reindeer herds would have represented, and the population avoided forced evacuation. Of Kautokeino's 1,330 inhabitants, 47 were forcibly evacuated south. The fate of two women who fell ill and were forcibly evacuated south is still unknown.

Kautokeino was burned down by retreating German forces. The Germans began the burning of the Kautokeino church site on 20 November 1944, and the burning was completed in the first week of December. Of 220 buildings, 168 were burned, including the old Kautokeino church from 1701, which was burned on 3 December 1944.

=== After World War II ===
==== 1945–1949 ====
- On Tuesday, 5 February 1946, Finnmarksposten reports that tests with American track vehicles have been done on the stretch between Alta and Kautokeino, showing that they can cover the distance in 5 hours, compared to reindeer pulling pulks that take 3 days for the same distance.
- On Monday, 11 November 1946, the newspaper Tromsø reports that the Swedish "nomad school inspector" Israel Roung has applied for a 4-week study stay in Kautokeino to study the Sami language.
- On 25 January 1948 the reconstruction administration's barracks burn down to the ground. The building was around 300 square meters and had been brought to Kautokeino from Sweden after the war. The sheriff's office had been located in the barracks but had just moved out.
- In January and December 1948, reports are made about wolf packs of up to 30 animals killing reindeer and scattering reindeer herds in areas south of Kautokeino. A wolf attack is reported between Áidejávri and Oskal, about 20-30 kilometers from Kautokeino, killing 30–40 reindeer in January, and wolf attacks in the same area again in December.
- In January 1949, the Ministry of Transport and Communications grants 280,000 kroner for the construction of Kautokeino guesthouse. 280,000 kroner in 1949 equals 6.7 million kroner in 2022.
- On Saturday, 30 July 1949, the permanent bridge over Kautokeino River in Kautokeino city center is opened for traffic.

==== 1950–1959 ====
- On 1 February 1951, Nord-Norsk Hotelldrift takes over the operation of Kautokeino Guesthouse. The guesthouse has 17 rooms and 48 beds. There is no running water in the guest rooms, and heating is done with wood and coke. It is financed by the state. The guesthouse was completed in late 1950.
- The National Home Industry School for Sami, later the Sami Upper Secondary School and Reindeer Herding School, opens in Kautokeino in 1952.
- On 3 September 1952, a Widerøe Norseman plane is wrecked during landing at Gávdnjajávri inside today's Ánarjohka National Park. All four people on board escape unharmed, but the plane is completely destroyed. The plane was on assignment for the intelligence service to deliver military equipment to a depot to be used in the event of Norway being attacked by the Soviet Union.
- Čábardasjohka power plant opens on 15 December 1953 with a capacity of 150 kW. The power plant supplies 400-500 subscribers.
- On Sunday, 28 March 1954, the first official reindeer race is organized in Kautokeino. The event takes place in connection with the Norwegian Reindeer Herders' National Association holding its national meeting in the village. The track was about 2 km long and went downstream from the bridge and back. The winner of the competition was Karen Anne Kemi.
- The Royal Norwegian Air Force station in Kautokeino is established in March 1955.
- On Friday, 22 February 1957, the reindeer slaughterhouse in Kautokeino opens.
- The film Same Jakki by Per Høst, which is partly filmed in Kautokeino and is about a family from Kautokeino, premieres on Thursday, 21 March 1957.
- Kautokeino Church is inaugurated on Sunday, 28 September 1958.
- On Thursday, 23 July 1959, King Olav V visits Kautokeino. It is the first time a Norwegian king visits the village. In the newspaper Drammens Tidende of 24 July, there is a picture of the king greeting 97-year-old Marit Hætta during the king's visit to the old-age home.
- Juhls' silver gallery is established in Kautokeino in 1959 by Frank and Regine Juhls. Regine Juhls is originally from East Prussia, while Frank Juhls was from Denmark.

==== 1960–1969 ====
- The road from Tangen Bru in Alta via Kløfta to Suolovuopmi is put into operation on Saturday, 22 October 1960 This stretch is an all-year road and replaces the road over Bæskades, which has been closed during winter.
- The road up to the Finnish border is opened for traffic on Tuesday, 8 November 1960. The last 1.7 km up to the border is still of poor quality, but the road is passable for car traffic. Large parts of the road (37 km of 42 km) are financed by Kautokeino municipality through the municipal budget and through loans the municipality has taken up in the municipal bank.
- The tuberculosis epidemic in Kautokeino, which has resulted in 45 confirmed tuberculosis cases since 1958, comes under control in 1961. Comprehensive and systematic X-ray screening of the population and vaccination help stop the spread. The epidemic in Kautokeino is described as the most extensive tuberculosis epidemic in Norway in the last 60 years.
- On Sunday, 30 December 1962, Kautokeino guesthouse burns down to the ground. No people are injured.
- The population of the municipality exceeds 2000, with 2063 inhabitants as of 1 January 1963.
- Guovdageainnu Sámi Searvi is established on 1 December 1963. Aslak Loso is elected as the chairman of the local association.
- On 2 December 1963, the power line from Nord-Troms to Kautokeino opens and the power supply becomes more stable with the power supply from Kildalen power plant in addition to the Čábardasjohka power plant. The power supply to Kautokeino has been unstable with power rationing at times, this since the power production from Čábardašjohka has not been sufficient to cover the consumption in Kautokeino.
- In June 1965, several newspapers report that a muskrat was shot for the first time in Norway at Gálanitu 13 km southwest of Kautokeino
- On Thursday, 11 November 1965, the all-year road between Alta and Kautokeino opens. The road will not be officially opened until later and some additional work still remains, but the road is passable in winter, giving Kautokeino an all-year road connection to Alta.
- The tourist hotel in Kautokeino opens in July 1966. The hotel has 100 beds and costs 5 million kroner in 1966, equivalent to 59 million kroner in 2022.
- In the midst of the cloudberry season in 1967, a sudden bout of treacherous weather struck the mountains, catching many people off guard. On 6 August, two cloudberry pickers were reported missing in Finnmarksvidda. A 60-year-old woman from Tromsø disappeared in the Suolovuopmi area, 70 kilometers north of Kautokeino, while a 75-year-old man from Alta vanished west of Oskal, twenty kilometers south of Kautokeino.The situation worsened on the night of 7 August, when the region experienced severe weather, leading to 42 mm of precipitation in Kautokeino. An extensive search operation was launched to locate the missing individuals. Tragically, the woman was found deceased on 11 August, while the man remained undiscovered until two years later, in August 1969.
- The car and construction road from Kautokeino to Biedjovággi starts at the end of June–July 1968 and opens for car traffic later in the year.
- Saturday, 19 April 1969, Crown Princess Sonja and Crown Prince Harald visit Kautokeino. They arrive from Karasjok, partly by snowmobile, snowmobile-driving, and the final stretch by helicopter. On Sunday, 20 April, they attend a church service in Kautokeino Church, before visiting the mining area in Biedjovággi, 40 kilometeres north of Kautokeino, which is under construction.

==== 1970–1979 ====
- Biedjovággi mines open their first operating period in 1970.
- Kautokeino Easter Festival is organized for the first time in Kautokeino in 1971
- The Nordic Sami Institute is established in 1973 and placed in Kautokeino.
- On Monday, 25 November 1974, a referendum is held on whether it should be legal to sell beer in stores in Kautokeino. 393 vote against and 192 voted yes. Approximately 40% of eligible voters cast their vote.
- Biedjovággi mines close for the first time due to low copper prices in 1975.
- Kautokeino municipal council opposes the development plans for the Alta-Kautokeino watershed when the issue was discussed in the municipal council on 19 January 1976.
- The Kautokeino School Board decides to maintain the joik ban in the school, which was adopted in 1953.
- On 1 November 1976, national road 92 between Karasjok and Kautokeino is opened for car traffic on the last remaining section; thus reducing the shortest car route between the two places from 378 kilometers to 146 kilometers.
- The Sámi Education Council is established in 1977 and the secretariat is placed in Kautokeino.
- On 30 November 1978, the Storting (Norwegian Parliament) decides to develop the Kautokeino-Alta watershed. This led to major protests and is later known as the opposition to the development of the Kautokeino-Alta watershed. The investment cost estimate was 600 million Norwegian kroner, corresponding to 3,1 billion Norwegian kroner in 2023.

==== 1980–1989 ====
- On Monday, 16 February 1981, a torchlight procession is organized in Kautokeino under the auspices of the People's Campaign against the development of the Alta-Kautokeino watershed. About 250 people participate in the torchlight procession. Counter-demonstrators try to prevent the torchlight procession by blocking the road with cars and throwing a smoke bomb into the procession. No people are harmed, and no further confrontations occur between the groups.
- On Tuesday, 3 March 1981, the municipal council decides to give equal status to Guovdageaidnu and Kautokeino as place names. Previously, the name has only been Kautokeino. The majority in the municipal council is as narrow as possible with 10 votes against 9. The minority argued that the official name should still be Kautokeino, but that the use of Sámi place names in the municipality would be allowed.
- The new cultural center and environmental building will be opened on Saturday, 13 June 1981. The building houses a cinema/theater hall, the public library in Kautokeino, the Nordic Sami Institute, and the Sami Education Council. The building cost a total of 18 million kroner in 1981, equivalent to 68 million in 2022.
- Beaivváš Sámi Našunálateáhter is established in Kautokeino in 1981 and is located in the new cultural center and environmental building.
- The new reindeer slaughterhouse will be opened on Friday, 11 December 1981, by Minister of Agriculture Johan C. Løken. The slaughterhouse cost 32 million in 1981, equivalent to 120 million kroner in 2022.
- In February 1982, a unanimous Supreme Court concludes that the development decision regarding the development of the Kautokeino-Alta river system is valid.
- The Finnish industrial company Outokumpu Oy opens the second operating period of the Biedjovággi mines in 1985.
- Alta power plant, where the reservoir is Virdnejávri in Kautokeino municipality, is opened in 1987.
- On 1 January 1988, the operations center at the Air Force Station in Kautokeino is closed. The number of employees is reduced from 63 to 21. The number of conscript soldiers in Kautokeino has been about 40 people, so the station has consisted of about 100 people in total before the reorganization. The Armed Forces move out of the buildings in Kautokeino city center. The buildings are later taken over by the Sami University College.
- Ellen Inga O. Hætta becomes Kautokeino's first female mayor in 1988.
- Ole Henrik Magga from Kautokeino becomes the first Sami Parliament President in Norway after the first Sami Parliament election in September 1989.
- Sami University College opens on 1 November 1989.

==== 1990–1999 ====
- Sami Grand Prix is held for the first time in Kautokeino in 1990.
- On Thursday, 11 October 1990, a Bell 206 JetRanger with two people on board crashed about 2 miles west of Suolovuopmi in Kautokeino municipality. Both people on board died in the crash. The helicopter was on its way from Kvænangen to Masi.
- Biedjovággi mines shut down for the second time on 20 September 1991. 110 people lose their jobs, 50 people associated with the mine itself and the rest employees of subcontractors. During the second operating period from 1985 to 1991, a total of 24,000 tonnes of copper and 6,000 kg of gold were extracted from the Biedjovággi mines. For comparison, 40,000 tonnes of copper were extracted from the Nye Storwartz mines in Røros during the operating period that extended from 1708 to 1947.
- The population of the municipality exceeds 3,000, with 3,011 inhabitants as of 1 January 1992.
- On Friday, 7 August 1992, King Harald and Queen Sonja visit Kautokeino during their consecration tour in Northern Norway. The royal couple arrives by helicopter and stays in Kautokeino for about 3 hours.
- Báktehárji multi-purpose hall opens in November 1992.
- Nobel Peace Prize winner Rigoberto Menchu Tum visits Kautokeino in December and participates in a church service on Sunday, 13 December 1992. She is invited by Sami Parliament President Ole Herik Magga.
- On Thursday, 28 October 1993, beer is available for purchase over the counter in Kautokeino for the first time in over 20 years when the new beer outlet opens.
- Spring hunting for ducks is opened in Kautokeino in 1994, initially as a three-year trial arrangement. The arrangement is later continued. Spring duck hunting has traditions in Kautokeino.
- The Air Force's Kautokeino station is closed as a separate unit on 1 August 1995 and is placed under the 131st Air Wing Sørreisa. The number of employees is reduced from 21 to 13, and there are no longer conscript soldiers in Kautokeino; there were 5 conscript soldiers in Kautokeino when the station closed down.
- The Dalai Lama visits Kautokeino during Pentecost 1996. He leaves Kautokeino on the second day of Pentecost, 27 May 1996. In Kautokeino, he meets the Sami Parliament presidents of Norway (Ole Henrik Magga), Sweden (Ingwar Åhren), and Finland (Pekka Aikio). In a joint statement, the three Sami parliaments condemn China's human rights violations against the Tibetan people, stating that Tibet is an occupied country and that China's occupation.
- The peak number of inhabitants in the municipality as of 1 January 1997, with 3,176 inhabitants.
- On Sunday, 6 April 1997, Børre Knudsen is "ordained as a bishop" in Strandebarm deanery. The ordination takes place in Kautokeino Church and is highly controversial. Parish priest Olav Berg Lyngmo in Kautokeino supports Børre Knudsen in the conflict with the Norwegian Church. The dispute revolves around views on abortion and homosexuality, where Børre Knudsen is supported by parish priest Olav Berg Lyngmo in the opinion that the Norwegian Church has a too liberal view on these issues.
- On Friday, 2 July 1998, Church Minister Jon Lilletun decides to file a dismissal case against parish priest Olav Berg Lyngmo due to the conflict between the parish priest and Bishop Ola Steinholt. Olav Berg Lyngmo has, among other things, not accepted the bishop as his spiritual leader.
- On Saturday, 9 October 1999, Hættas landhandel closes its doors for the last time. The store reopens as Rema 1000 in December of the same year.

=== 2000 to present ===
==== 2000–2009 ====
- On Friday, 21 January 2000, the verdict is given in the case where the state has filed a lawsuit to have parish priest Olav Berg Lyngmo dismissed. The state loses the case in the district court, and the parish priest keeps his job. Newly appointed Church Minister Trond Giske decides on 21 March that the state will appeal the verdict where parish priest Olav Berg Lyngmo is allowed to keep his job as parish priest in Kautokeino.
- On Thursday, 7 September 2000, the new health center in Kautokeino is officially opened. The health center cost 50 million kroner in 2000, equivalent to 81 million kroner in 2022.
- On Friday, 12 January 2001, the verdict is given in the Court of Appeals where the state has appealed the district court's decision that parish priest Olav Berg Lyngmo can keep his job. The state wins the appeal case. The verdict in the Court of Appeals is unanimous, and the parish priest is stripped of his job and must additionally pay his own and the state's legal costs in the appellate court.
- At the end of May 2001, it becomes clear that the Supreme Court Appeals Selection Committee rejects the appeal from parish priest Olav Berg Lyngmo, so the dismissal verdict where he is stripped of his office as parish priest becomes final and legally binding.
- Mail in Store opens on Monday, 3 June 2002, in Coop Prix's premises. The post office is closed.
- On 5 December 2002, the wine monopoly opens in Kautokeino.
- Nordlandia hotel in Kautokeino burns down on 15 July 2003 and is completely destroyed. No persons were hurt in the fire.
- The population of the municipality falls again below 3,000, with 2,997 inhabitants as of 1 January 2005
- King Harald lays the foundation stone for the Sami Science Building / Diehtosiida in 2007.
- Thon opens a new hotel in Kautokeino in 2008.
- The Sami College moves into a new building, Diehtosiida in 2009.

==== 2010–2019 ====
- On 16 December 2013, the municipal council rejected with 10 votes against 9 an application from the Swedish company Arctic Gold for permission to carry out a consequence assessment for mining in Biedjovággi.
- In August 2016, the third Sápmi Pride LGBT festival was moved to Kautokeino to protest that the local church council refused to wed gays and lesbians in its church, and to protest that the lead priest for the parish said that homosexuality is something that people can rid themselves of.

==== 2020–onwards ====
- In 2021, construction begins for a new elementary and secondary school. Budget of 207 million. Gross area approx. 6,000 m². Taken over by Kautokeino municipality on 16 January 2023. On 16 February, students and teachers move in.
- In 2022, construction begins for a new joint building for Beaivváš Sámi Našunálateáhter and the Sami High School and Reindeer Herding School. Budget of 485 million. Gross area approx. 7,000 m². Moving in on 1 August 2024.
- The new elementary and secondary school is officially opened by Crown Prince Haakon on 18 April 2023.
- In April 2023, the government adopts a new regulation concerning spring hunting of ducks in Kautokeino. The quota is set at 500 ducks, with species such as the tufted duck, common goldeneye, red-breasted merganser, and common merganser being huntable, and the hunting period is set to last 15 days between 5 May and 6 June. In connection with the announcement of the regulation, Minister of Climate and Environment Espen Barth Eide states that spring duck hunting has been important in Sami tradition for gaining access to food after winter.
- In connection with the NATO exercise Nordic Response 2024, the three defense ministers of Norway (Bjørn Arild Gram), Sweden (Pål Jonson), and Finland (Antti Häkkänen) met on 9 March 2024, at the Kivilompolo border crossing to mark the crossing of Swedish and Finnish forces into Norway and Kautokeino as NATO members. The force that crossed the border was a combined Swedish-Finnish division of about 5000 soldiers with accompanying vehicles, including, among other things, tanks and rocket artillery. This is the first time in history that a NATO exercise in Kautokeino involves the crossing into Norway by Finnish and Swedish forces as NATO members.

== Churches ==
The Church of Norway has one parish (sokn) within Kautokeino Municipality. It is part of the Indre Finnmark prosti (deanery) in the Diocese of Nord-Hålogaland.

Churches in Kautokeino Municipality
Parish (sokn)	Church name	Location	Year built
Kautokeino	Kautokeino Church	Kautokeino	1958
Kautokeino	Láhpoluoppal Chapel	Láhpoluoppal	1967
Kautokeino	Masi Church	Masi	1965

== Government ==
Kautokeino Municipality is responsible for primary education (through 10th grade), outpatient health services, senior citizen services, welfare and other social services, zoning, economic development, and municipal roads and utilities. The municipality is governed by a municipal council of directly elected representatives. The mayor is indirectly elected by a vote of the municipal council. The municipality is under the jurisdiction of the Indre og Østre Finnmark District Court and the Hålogaland Court of Appeal.

=== Municipal council ===
The municipal council (Kommunestyre) of Kautokeino Municipality is made up of 19 representatives that are elected to four year terms. The tables below show the current and historical composition of the council by political party.

Guovdageaidnu Kautokeino kommunestyre 2023–2027
Party name (in Norwegian)	Number of representatives
Labour Party (Arbeiderpartiet)	4
Progress Party (Fremskrittspartiet)	1
Conservative Party (Høyre)	1
Centre Party (Senterpartiet)	1
Liberal Party (Venstre)	1
Árja	2
Kautokeino Permanent Resident List (Kautokeino Fastboendes liste)	1
Kautokeino Travelling Sámi List (Kautokeino Flyttsameliste)	5
Kautokeino Sami List (Guovdageainnu Sámilistu)	3
Total number of members:	19

Guovdageaidnu Kautokeino kommunestyre 2019–2023
Party name (in Norwegian)	Number of representatives
Labour Party (Arbeiderpartiet)	2
Conservative Party (Høyre)	1
Centre Party (Senterpartiet)	3
Liberal Party (Venstre)	2
Kautokeino Permanent Resident List (Kautokeino Fastboendes liste)	5
Kautokeino Travelling Sámi List (Kautokeino Flyttsameliste)	4
Sámeálbmot List (Sámeálbmot Listu)	2
Total number of members:	19

Guovdageaidnu Kautokeino kommunestyre 2015–2019
Party name (in Norwegian)	Number of representatives
Labour Party (Arbeiderpartiet)	5
Conservative Party (Høyre)	1
Liberal Party (Venstre)	2
Kautokeino Permanent Resident List (Kautokeino Fastboendes liste)	5
Kautokeino Travelling Sámi List (Kautokeino Flyttsameliste)	4
Sámeálbmot List (Sámeálbmot Listu)	2
Total number of members:	19

Guovdageaidnu Kautokeino kommunestyre 2011–2015
Party name (in Norwegian)	Number of representatives
Labour Party (Arbeiderpartiet)	2
Conservative Party (Høyre)	2
Sámi People's Party (Samefolkets Parti)	5
Liberal Party (Venstre)	2
Kautokeino Permanent Resident List (Kautokeino Fastboendes liste)	3
Kautokeino Travelling Sámi List (Kautokeino Flyttsameliste)	5
Total number of members:	19

Guovdageaidnu Kautokeino kommunestyre 2007–2011
Party name (in Norwegian)	Number of representatives
Labour Party (Arbeiderpartiet)	1
Progress Party (Fremskrittspartiet)	1
Conservative Party (Høyre)	1
Sámi People's Party (Samefolkets Parti)	4
Centre Party (Senterpartiet)	2
Liberal Party (Venstre)	2
Kautokeino Permanent Resident List (Kautokeino Fastboendes liste)	5
Kautokeino Travelling Sámi List (Kautokeino Flyttsameliste)	3
Total number of members:	19

Guovdageaidnu-Kautokeino kommunestyre 2003–2007
Party name (in Norwegian)	Number of representatives
Labour Party (Arbeiderpartiet)	1
Conservative Party (Høyre)	1
Sámi People's Party (Samefolkets Parti)	2
Centre Party (Senterpartiet)	3
Socialist Left Party (Sosialistisk Venstreparti)	1
Liberal Party (Venstre)	4
Kautokeino Permanent Resident List (Kautokeino Fastboendes liste)	3
Kautokeino Travelling Sámi List (Kautokeino Flyttsameliste)	4
Total number of members:	19

Guovdageaidnu-Kautokeino kommunestyre 1999–2003
Party name (in Norwegian)	Number of representatives
Labour Party (Arbeiderpartiet)	2
Conservative Party (Høyre)	1
Centre Party (Senterpartiet)	2
Liberal Party (Venstre)	4
Sami List (Samefolkets liste)	2
Johttisâpmelaččaid list (Johttisâpmelaččaid listu)	3
Dâlonüd list (Dâlonüd listu)	3
Máze list (Mázelista)	1
Total number of members:	19

Guovdageaidnu-Kautokeino kommunestyre 1995–1999
Party name (in Norwegian)	Number of representatives
Labour Party (Arbeiderpartiet)	3
Conservative Party (Høyre)	1
Christian Democratic Party (Kristelig Folkeparti)	2
Centre Party (Senterpartiet)	2
Liberal Party (Venstre)	5
Sami List (Samefolkets liste)	1
Johttisâpmelaččaid list (Johttisâpmelaččaid listu)	3
Total number of members:	19

Guovdageaidnu-Kautokeino kommunestyre 1991–1995
Party name (in Norwegian)	Number of representatives
Labour Party (Arbeiderpartiet)	2
Conservative Party (Høyre)	4
Christian Democratic Party (Kristelig Folkeparti)	1
Centre Party (Senterpartiet)	1
Socialist Left Party (Sosialistisk Venstreparti)	1
Liberal Party (Venstre)	2
Guovdageainnu Dáloniid list (Guovdageainnu Dáloniid listu)	3
Boazu Ealáhus list (Boazu Ealáhus listu)	1
Johttisâpmelaččaid list (Johttisâpmelaččaid listu)	2
Total number of members:	19

Guovdageaidnu-Kautokeino kommunestyre 1987–1991
Party name (in Norwegian)	Number of representatives
Labour Party (Arbeiderpartiet)	4
Conservative Party (Høyre)	5
Christian Democratic Party (Kristelig Folkeparti)	2
Centre Party (Senterpartiet)	1
Liberal Party (Venstre)	2
Sami List (Samefolkets liste)	3
Johttisâpmelaččaid list (Johttisâpmelaččaid listu)	2
Total number of members:	19

Kautokeino kommunestyre 1983–1987
Party name (in Norwegian)	Number of representatives
Labour Party (Arbeiderpartiet)	6
Conservative Party (Høyre)	4
Christian Democratic Party (Kristelig Folkeparti)	1
Centre Party (Senterpartiet)	1
Liberal Party (Venstre)	1
Sami List (Samefolkets liste)	3
Jåttisabmelazzait List (Jåttisabmelazzait listo)	3
Total number of members:	19

Kautokeino kommunestyre 1979–1983
Party name (in Norwegian)	Number of representatives
Labour Party (Arbeiderpartiet)	5
Conservative Party (Høyre)	4
Christian Democratic Party (Kristelig Folkeparti)	1
Centre Party (Senterpartiet)	2
Liberal Party (Venstre)	1
Sami List (Samefolkets liste)	3
Jåttisabmelazzait List (Jåttisabmelazzait listo)	3
Total number of members:	19

Kautokeino kommunestyre 1975–1979
Party name (in Norwegian)	Number of representatives
Labour Party (Arbeiderpartiet)	4
Conservative Party (Høyre)	3
Christian Democratic Party (Kristelig Folkeparti)	2
Centre Party (Senterpartiet)	1
Liberal Party (Venstre)	1
Sami List (Samefolkets liste)	3
Jåttisabmelazzait List (Jåttisabmelazzait listo)	3
Total number of members:	17

Kautokeino kommunestyre 1971–1975
Party name (in Norwegian)	Number of representatives
Labour Party (Arbeiderpartiet)	7
Conservative Party (Høyre)	3
Christian Democratic Party (Kristelig Folkeparti)	1
Centre Party (Senterpartiet)	1
Liberal Party (Venstre)	2
Local List(s) (Lokale lister)	3
Total number of members:	17

Kautokeino kommunestyre 1967–1971
Party name (in Norwegian)	Number of representatives
Labour Party (Arbeiderpartiet)	7
Conservative Party (Høyre)	4
Centre Party (Senterpartiet)	1
Liberal Party (Venstre)	3
Local List(s) (Lokale lister)	2
Total number of members:	17

Kautokeino kommunestyre 1963–1967
Party name (in Norwegian)	Number of representatives
Labour Party (Arbeiderpartiet)	5
Conservative Party (Høyre)	3
Local List(s) (Lokale lister)	7
Total number of members:	15

Kautokeino herredsstyre 1959–1963
Party name (in Norwegian)	Number of representatives
Labour Party (Arbeiderpartiet)	4
Conservative Party (Høyre)	2
Local List(s) (Lokale lister)	9
Total number of members:	15

Kautokeino herredsstyre 1955–1959
Party name (in Norwegian)	Number of representatives
Labour Party (Arbeiderpartiet)	2
Local List(s) (Lokale lister)	13
Total number of members:	15

Kautokeino herredsstyre 1951–1955
Party name (in Norwegian)	Number of representatives
Local List(s) (Lokale lister)	12
Total number of members:	12

Kautokeino herredsstyre 1947–1951
Party name (in Norwegian)	Number of representatives
List of workers, fishermen, and small farmholders (Arbeidere, fiskere, småbrukere liste)	1
Local List(s) (Lokale lister)	11
Total number of members:	12

Kautokeino herredsstyre 1945–1947
Party name (in Norwegian)	Number of representatives
List of workers, fishermen, and small farmholders (Arbeidere, fiskere, småbrukere liste)	6
Local List(s) (Lokale lister)	8
Total number of members:	12

Kautokeino herredsstyre 1937–1941*
Party name (in Norwegian)	Number of representatives
Joint List(s) of Non-Socialist Parties (Borgerlige Felleslister)	8
Local List(s) (Lokale lister)	4
Total number of members:	12
Note: Due to the German occupation of Norway during World War II, no elections were held for new municipal councils until after the war ended in 1945.

=== Mayors ===
The mayor (Norwegian: ordfører) of Kautokeino Municipality is the political leader of the municipality and the chairperson of the municipal council. Here is a list of people who have held this position:

- 1853–1857: Frederik Waldermar Hvoslef
- 1857–1859: Andreas Edevard Berger
- 1859–1861: Ole Isaksen Hætta
- 1861–1867: Carl Adolph Moe
- 1867–1869: Ole Isaksen Hætta
- 1869–1871: Ludvig Kristoffer Olavius Strømme
- 1871–1873: Morten Clemetsen
- 1873–1875: Ole Andreas Johannessen
- 1875–1877: Morten Clemetsen
- 1877–1879: Ole Andreas Johannessen
- 1879–1881: L. Larsen
- 1881–1888: Georg Karelius Nordrum
- 1888–1900: Henrik Pentha
- 1900–1904: Johannes Mathisen Hætta
- 1917–1922: Peter Lorenz de Ferry Smith
- 1923–1934: Lyder Aarseth
- 1935–1940: Ludvig Johan Madsen
- 1941–1945: Morten M. Klemetsen
- 1946–1947: Jan K. Lund
- 1948–1955: Alfred Larsen
- 1956–1963: Arvid Dahl (V)
- 1964–1969: Lauri Abiel Keskitalo (H)
- 1970–1971: Oddmund Sandvik
- 1972–1973: Lauri Abiel Keskitalo (H)
- 1974–1975: Oddmund Sandvik
- 1976–1977: Mathis Mathisen Sara (LL)
- 1978–1979: Klemet O. Hætta (H)
- 1980–1981: Ole Henrik Buljo (Sp)
- 1982–1983: Klemet O. Hætta (H)
- 1984–1987: Ole Henrik Buljo (Sp)
- 1988–1991: Ellen Inga O. Hætta (H)
- 1992–1993: Ole Henrik Buljo (Sp)
- 1994–1999: Anton Dahl (V)
- 1999–2003: Jan Ole Buljo (Sp)
- 2003–2015: Klemet Erland Hætta (SáB)
- 2015–2019: Johan Vasara (Ap)
- 2019–2023: Hans Isak Olsen (LL)
- 2023–present: Anders S. Buljo (LL)

== Geography ==
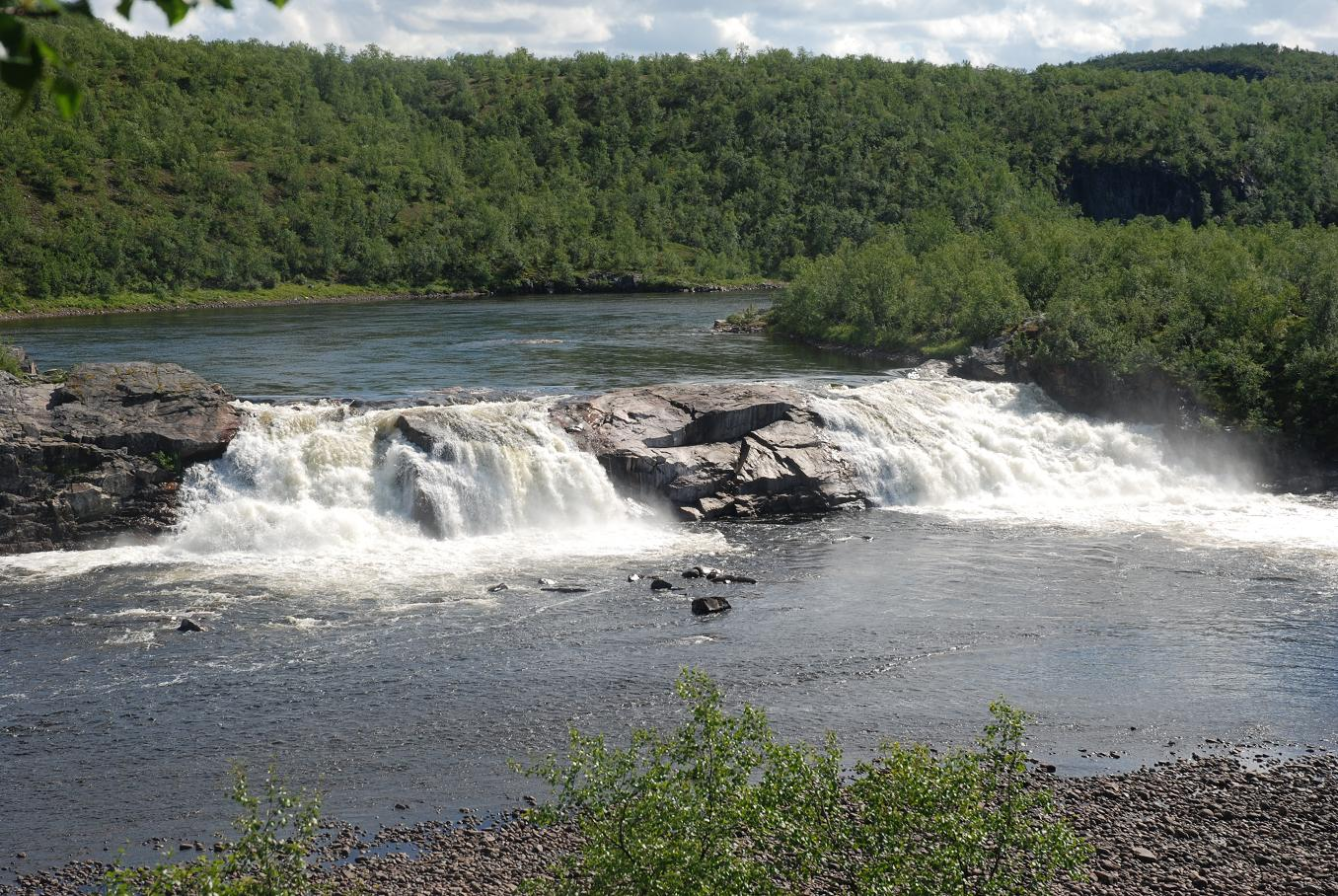
Pikefossen waterfall in the Alta-Kautokeino river, Kautokeino municipality.

Guovdageaidnu/Kautokeino is the southernmost municipality of Finnmark county and it shares a border with several municipalities: Alta Municipality to the north, Kárášjoga Municipality to the east, Nordreisa Municipality and Kvænangen Municipality (in Troms county) to the west, and Enontekiö Municipality (in Finland) to the south.

At 9,707 square kilometres (3,748 sq mi), it is the largest municipality in Norway. A total of approximately 10,000 lakes cover 737 square kilometres (285 sq mi). A significant part of the Finnmarksvidda plateau is located inside Kautokeino municipality. Anárjohka National Park is partially located in the municipality. The rivers Anarjohka and Karasjohka have their headwaters inside the park. The highest point in the municipality is the 973.9-metre (3,195 ft) tall mountain Mollejus.

The Guovdageaidnu-Kautokeino River runs from a lake at the Finnish border, north through the villages of Guovdageaidnu (Kautokeino) and Máze before it leaves into Alta municipality and changes name to Altaelva. The river is collectively known as the Kautokeino/Alta-vassdraget and was the site of a major political controversy in the late 1970s and early 1980s. The lake Šuoikkatjávri is located on the border of the municipality with Kvænangen. Other lakes in the municipality include Bajášjávri, Bajit Spielgajávri, Biggejávri, Čárajávri, Dátkojávri, Gahččanjávri, Gavdnjajávri, Geađgejávri, Geašjávri, Guolehis Suolojávri, Heammojávri, Iešjávri, Láhpojávri, Latnetjávri, Nuorbejávri, Rágesjávri, Sálganjávri, Soagŋojávri, Stuora Galbajávri, Stuorajávri, Šuoikkatjávri, Suolojávri, Virdnejávri, and Vuolit Spielgajávri.

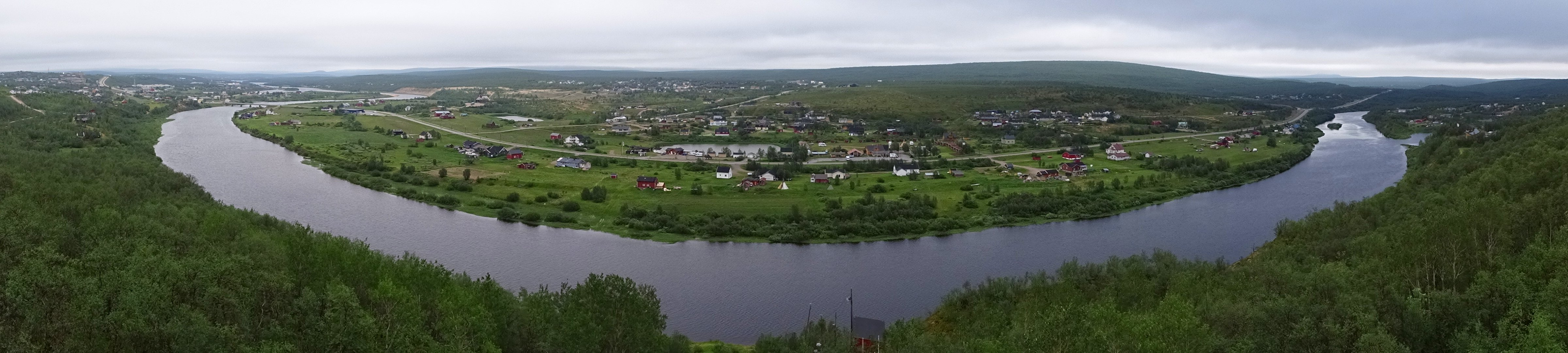
Kautokeino river in Kautokeino, as seen from the ski jump hill south of the town center in Kautokeino.

=== Climate ===
Kautokeino has a subarctic climate (Dfc) with cool to mild summers and long, cold and fairly dry winters. Located quite far inland on the Arctic highlands of the Finnmarksvidda plateau of Northern Norway, Kautokeino generally has warmer summer days than the coast to the north, but also much colder winter temperatures.

Located above the Arctic Circle at 69°N latitude, Kautokeino experiences midnight sun and polar nights. The Sun does not set for nine weeks in the summer (21 May to 22 July), and does not rise for six weeks in the winter (1 December to 11 January).

Kautokeino is the coldest town in mainland Norway by annual mean temperature. The all-time low −50.3 °C (−59 °F) was recorded in January 1999. The all-time high 30 °C (86 °F) was recorded in July 2018, which was the warmest month recorded with mean 18 °C (64 °F) and average daily high 23.6 °C (74.5 °F). The coldest month on record is, as for much of Norway, February 1966. That month Kautokeino had mean −25.8 °C (−14.4 °F), average daily high −20.7 °C (−5.3 °F), average daily low −32.1 °C (−25.8 °F) - and the warmest high that February was −8.9 °C (16.0 °F).

Average precipitation in the municipality ranges from 400 millimetres (15.7 in) to 600 millimetres (24 in) per year, which is relatively dry by Norwegian standards.

During summer, daytime temperatures typically range between 10 °C (50 °F) and 20 °C (68 °F). While this is nice for humans, the temperature, combined with 10,000 lakes, makes it a heaven for mosquitos. Consequently, both humans and reindeer tend to flee to the coast for the summer. The average date for the last overnight freeze (low below 0 °C (32.0 °F)) in spring is 31 May and average date for first freeze in autumn is 19 August giving an average frost-free season of 79 days (1981–2010 average).

While winter usually lasts from mid-October until well into April, the hard winter is only for December–February. During hard winter, temperatures can drop as far as −40 °C (−40 °F) and beyond.

Climate data for Kautokeino 1991–2020 (307 m, extremes 1891–2022)
Month	Jan	Feb	Mar	Apr	May	Jun	Jul	Aug	Sep	Oct	Nov	Dec	Year
Record high °C (°F)	7.0 (44.6)	7.0 (44.6)	8.3 (46.9)	13.8 (56.8)	28.0 (82.4)	29.8 (85.6)	30.0 (86.0)	28.4 (83.1)	22.8 (73.0)	13.4 (56.1)	7.6 (45.7)	7.2 (45.0)	30.0 (86.0)
Mean daily maximum °C (°F)	−8.9 (16.0)	−8.5 (16.7)	−3.8 (25.2)	2.1 (35.8)	8.2 (46.8)	14.7 (58.5)	18.5 (65.3)	15.8 (60.4)	10.4 (50.7)	2.5 (36.5)	−3.9 (25.0)	−6.7 (19.9)	3.4 (38.1)
Daily mean °C (°F)	−14.1 (6.6)	−13.7 (7.3)	−9.2 (15.4)	−3.0 (26.6)	3.7 (38.7)	9.9 (49.8)	13.4 (56.1)	11.1 (52.0)	6.0 (42.8)	−1.2 (29.8)	−8.4 (16.9)	−11.8 (10.8)	−1.4 (29.4)
Mean daily minimum °C (°F)	−20.0 (−4.0)	−19.4 (−2.9)	−15.1 (4.8)	−7.9 (17.8)	−0.3 (31.5)	5.5 (41.9)	8.8 (47.8)	6.5 (43.7)	2.6 (36.7)	−3.5 (25.7)	−12.2 (10.0)	−17.1 (1.2)	−6.0 (21.2)
Record low °C (°F)	−50.3 (−58.5)	−48.8 (−55.8)	−41.5 (−42.7)	−33.7 (−28.7)	−20.7 (−5.3)	−5.0 (23.0)	−3.9 (25.0)	−6.2 (20.8)	−12.7 (9.1)	−33.8 (−28.8)	−40.7 (−41.3)	−45.0 (−49.0)	−50.3 (−58.5)
Average precipitation mm (inches)	22.1 (0.87)	19.4 (0.76)	13.8 (0.54)	17.5 (0.69)	33.5 (1.32)	58.5 (2.30)	71.5 (2.81)	64.8 (2.55)	42.4 (1.67)	31.3 (1.23)	24.4 (0.96)	25.0 (0.98)	424.2 (16.68)
Average precipitation days (≥ 1.0 mm)	7	8	6	7	9	10	10	10	9	8	7	8	99
Source 1: yr.no/eklima/Norwegian Meteorological Institute
Source 2: Noaa WMO averages 1991–2020 Norway

Climate data for Šihččajávri 1991–2020 (382 m)
Month	Jan	Feb	Mar	Apr	May	Jun	Jul	Aug	Sep	Oct	Nov	Dec	Year
Mean daily maximum °C (°F)	−8.9 (16.0)	−8.9 (16.0)	−4.7 (23.5)	0.7 (33.3)	6.6 (43.9)	13.8 (56.8)	17.4 (63.3)	15 (59)	9.3 (48.7)	1.1 (34.0)	−4.5 (23.9)	−6.9 (19.6)	2.5 (36.5)
Daily mean °C (°F)	−13.2 (8.2)	−13.2 (8.2)	−9.5 (14.9)	−3.9 (25.0)	2.5 (36.5)	9.1 (48.4)	12.8 (55.0)	10.7 (51.3)	5.6 (42.1)	−1.6 (29.1)	−7.9 (17.8)	−10.8 (12.6)	−1.6 (29.1)
Mean daily minimum °C (°F)	−18.9 (−2.0)	−18.9 (−2.0)	−15.3 (4.5)	−9 (16)	−1.7 (28.9)	4.6 (40.3)	8.2 (46.8)	6.1 (43.0)	1.8 (35.2)	−5 (23)	−12.4 (9.7)	−16.3 (2.7)	−6.4 (20.5)
Average precipitation mm (inches)	28.5 (1.12)	26.2 (1.03)	22.1 (0.87)	23.5 (0.93)	38.9 (1.53)	73.7 (2.90)	91.6 (3.61)	92.2 (3.63)	61.2 (2.41)	50.4 (1.98)	37.4 (1.47)	31.2 (1.23)	576.9 (22.71)
Average precipitation days (≥ 1.0 mm)	7	7	6	6	8	10	12	11	10	9	8	8	102
Source: Noaa WMO averages 1991–2020 Norway

Climate data for Kautokeino (1981–2010 normals)
Month	Jan	Feb	Mar	Apr	May	Jun	Jul	Aug	Sep	Oct	Nov	Dec	Year
Record high °C (°F)	7.0 (44.6)	7.0 (44.6)	7.6 (45.7)	12.0 (53.6)	28.0 (82.4)	29.8 (85.6)	29.1 (84.4)	28.2 (82.8)	22.8 (73.0)	13.3 (55.9)	7.6 (45.7)	7.2 (45.0)	29.8 (85.6)
Mean daily maximum °C (°F)	−9.6 (14.7)	−9.2 (15.4)	−5.4 (22.3)	0.2 (32.4)	6.4 (43.5)	13.6 (56.5)	17.0 (62.6)	14.3 (57.7)	8.6 (47.5)	1.1 (34.0)	−5.5 (22.1)	−8.2 (17.2)	2.0 (35.6)
Daily mean °C (°F)	−14.7 (5.5)	−14.3 (6.3)	−10.5 (13.1)	−4.8 (23.4)	2.2 (36.0)	9.0 (48.2)	12.4 (54.3)	9.9 (49.8)	4.8 (40.6)	−2.1 (28.2)	−9.8 (14.4)	−13.4 (7.9)	−2.5 (27.5)
Mean daily minimum °C (°F)	−19.9 (−3.8)	−19.4 (−2.9)	−15.7 (3.7)	−9.8 (14.4)	−1.9 (28.6)	4.3 (39.7)	7.3 (45.1)	5.5 (41.9)	1.0 (33.8)	−5.3 (22.5)	−14.0 (6.8)	−18.5 (−1.3)	−7.1 (19.2)
Record low °C (°F)	−50.5 (−58.9)	−48.8 (−55.8)	−40.8 (−41.4)	−33.7 (−28.7)	−19.3 (−2.7)	−3.5 (25.7)	−1.9 (28.6)	−6.2 (20.8)	−12.0 (10.4)	−30.0 (−22.0)	−40.8 (−41.4)	−42.0 (−43.6)	−50.5 (−58.9)
Average precipitation mm (inches)	18.7 (0.74)	16.2 (0.64)	17.4 (0.69)	18.8 (0.74)	26.8 (1.06)	48.0 (1.89)	68.2 (2.69)	66.3 (2.61)	44.2 (1.74)	35.8 (1.41)	25.5 (1.00)	18.5 (0.73)	405.2 (15.95)
Average precipitation days (≥ 1 mm)	6.2	5.4	5.8	5.9	6.9	8.7	11.0	10.6	9.6	8.9	7.8	5.8	92.6
Source: Météo Climat

=== Birdlife ===
Lying south in the county, and bordering with Finland, Guovdageaidnu/Kautokeino has a very interesting birdlife. There are virtually thousands of lakes in the municipality, and these combined with the Altaelva waterway system provide habitats for a whole host of wetland species. Whooper swan can sometimes be found while spotted redshank are not uncommon.

== Transportation ==
The nearest airports are Alta Airport, about 140 kilometres (87 mi) from Kautokeino, and Enontekiö Airport, about 90 kilometres (56 mi) from Kautokeino. The small Kautokeino Airport is located in the village, but it has no commercial services. European route E45 runs through Kautokeino, part of the shortest and fastest route between western Finnmark and southern Scandinavia.

== Population ==
In the village of Guovdageaidnu/Kautokeino, about 1,300 of the 3,000 people in the municipality reside. The village of Máze has about 400 people, while the remaining people in the municipality live in 14 smaller villages scattered around the area. The population has been declining about 3% over the last 10 years.

Guovdageaidnu/Kautokeino has different demographics than Finnmark county and Norway as a whole: more than 50% of the population is younger than 30 years. Also, the number of people older than 66 years is half of the national average. The gender ratio amounts to 86 women for every 100 men. For the last couple of years, Kautokeino has been plagued by high rates of unemployment, peaking at 10% in 2006/2007.

A survey conducted on behalf of the Sami Language Council in the year 2000 showed that 96 percent of the population are Sami speakers.

=== Villages ===
In addition to the administrative centre of Guovdageaidnu (Kautokeino), the municipality has 15 smaller villages:

- Máze (Masi) is the largest of the villages. Máze is located in a river valley. There is a school and Masi Church located in Máze. The current church has 150 seats and was built of wood in 1965. The first chapel was built in the 17th century. The second by Thomas von Westen in 1721. This church was burnt during World War II in 1944. The village was the site of a major political controversy in the late 1970s and early 80s, when it was proposed to flood village to build a large hydroelectric dam.
- Láhpoluoppal is a village located northeast of Guovdageaidnu at the southern end of the Láhppojávri lake. The village has a school, Láhpoluoppal Chapel, and mountain hut (Norwegian: fjellstue). The chapel has 70 seats and was built in 1967.
- Šihččajávri is located southeast of Guovdageaidnu (Kautokeino) village. The Norwegian Meteorological Institute has a weather observation station in the village, and often the place has the lowest temperature in Norway.
- Ávži is a village 10 kilometres (6 mi) east of Guovdageaidnu. During the Sami revolt in Guovdageaidnu, the group of Samis that captured the rebellions was organized here.
- Siebe is a village south of Guovdageaidnu.
- Mieron is a village north of Guovdageaidnu. Many of the Samis who traveled to Canada to teach the Inuit about reindeer herding were from Mieron.
- Stornes is a village north of Guovdageaidnu. Close to Stornes is a slate field with distinct green quartzite marketed as Naranas.
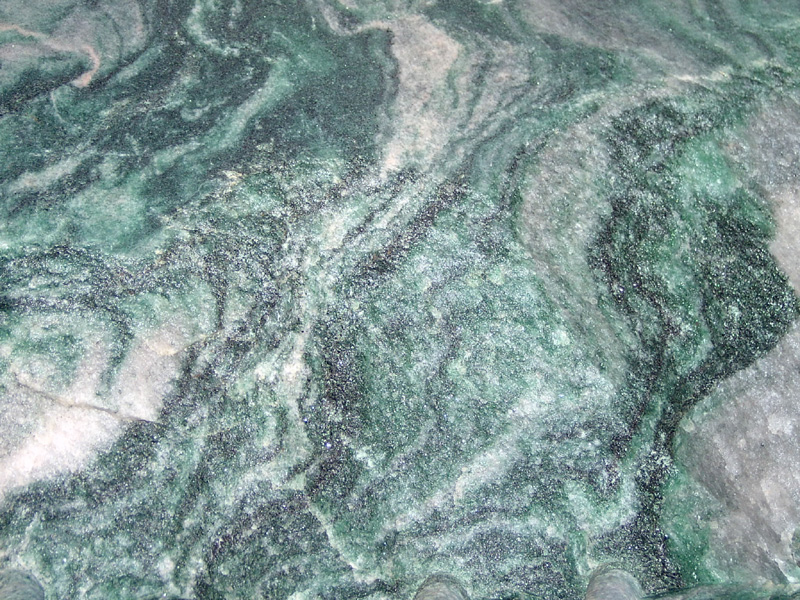
  Naranas quartzite.
- Šuoššjávri is a village northeast of Guovdageaidnu near the border with Karasjok with a chapel and a mountain hut. The chapel was built in 1968 and has 75 seats.
- Čunovuohppi is a small village with few houses and is 11 kilometres (7 mi) west of Guovdageaidnu. The village has a mountain hut (called Madame Bongos fjellstue).
- Suolovuopmi is north of Guovdageaidnu near the border with Alta. It is the location of a mountain hut, and is used for metrological observations.
- Gálaniitu is southwest of Guovdageaidnu and has a mountain hut.
- Áidejávri is south of Guovdageaidnu close to the Finnish border.
- Ákšomuotki (Økseidet) is south of Guovdageaidnu.
- Soahtefielbma is about 10 kilometres (6 mi) west of Guovdageaidnu.

== Institutions and media ==
Several Sámi institutions are located in Guovdageaidnu/Kautokeino, including:

- Beaivváš Sámi Theatre. The National Sámi Theatre. As a national stage company, they play a major role in making Sámi history and culture visible.
- Sámi Joatkkaskuvla ja Boazodoalloskuvla is the Sámi High School and Reindeer Herding School. The high school has emphasis on Sámi, rather than Norwegian culture. Most teachers speak Sámi as their mother tongue allowing for classes to be taught in Sámi. In addition to ordinary courses, students can also study duodji (traditional Sámi crafts) and reindeer herding. In fact, it is the only high school in the world that features a reindeer herding class.
- Sámi allaskuvla – the Sámi University College. The college has national responsibility for Sámi higher education, including teacher-, and journalist-training. The college attempts to develop the syllabuses on the basis of Sámi needs, and attempts to develop Sámi as an academic language.
- Nordic Sámi Institute. The Nordic Sámi Institute is a Sámi research institution. Research topics include the Sámi language, culture, reindeer husbandry and legal research. The institute published the DIEĐUT magazine.
- Sámi giellaossodat; The department of language at the Norwegian Sami Parliament. This department is the administration for the Sámi language board, it allocates the extra funding given to the municipalities that have Sámi as an official language (like Guovdageaidnu-Kautokeino), and it administers various projects related to Sámi languages.
- The department of education of the Norwegian Sami Parliament.

The Sámi are also internationally active with regards to indigenous people issues and reindeer husbandry. Therefore, the following institutions are also located in Guovdageaidnu/Kautokeino:

- Resource Centre for the Rights of Indigenous Peoples. The center attempts to collect, organize, and disseminate the knowledge and understanding of indigenous peoples' and Sami peoples' rights.
- International Centre For Reindeer Husbandry.

Guovdageaidnu/ Kautokeino is home to the following Sami media companies:

- Ávvir, a Sami language newspaper.
- DAT Sami publishing house and record company.

== Cultural events ==
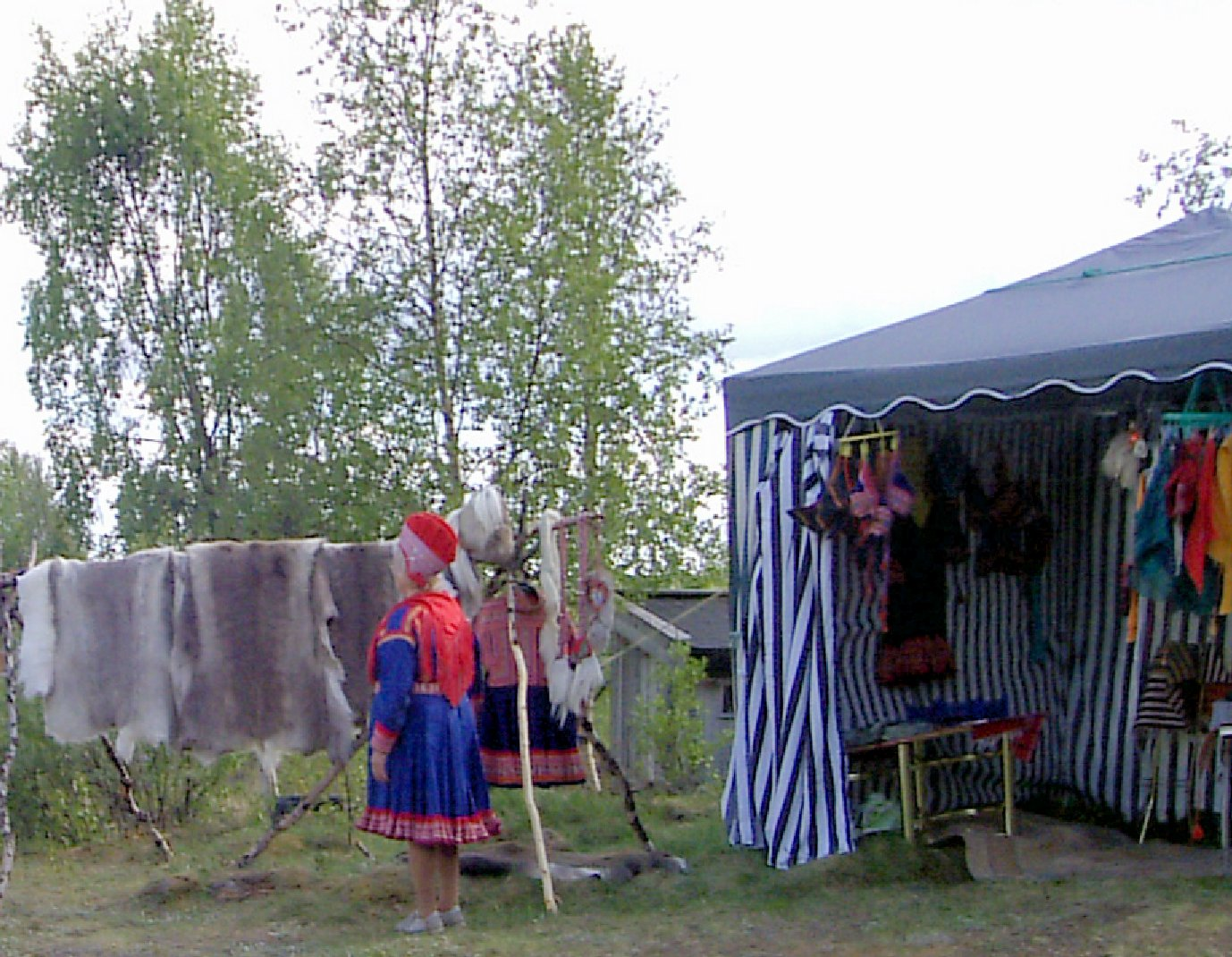
View of a Sami in traditional dress

Guovdageaidnu-Kautokeino is perhaps the cultural center of Northern Sámi today, and hosts several of the most well known Sami cultural events. The biggest event is the Sámi Easter Festival. Easter has traditionally been the time when the Sámis gather to celebrate weddings and confirmations. Today, also the Sami culture is celebrated with many yoik concerts, Sami theater shows, reindeer races, snowmobile races, ice fishing competitions, parties, and the Sámi Grand Prix; a Sámi version of the Eurovision Song Contest where in addition to the best song, the best yoik is also selected. In addition, the Sami Film Festival is usually held during the Easter, which is notable for having an outdoor cinema made of snow.

In June, the annual Guovdageaidnu-Kautokeino Walk/Bicycle Ride, has Sámis return to Guovdageaidnu-Kautokeino, just to walk a few kilometers, or ride a bicycle for twice the distance.

In August, there is the White Fish festival, as well as the Autumn Festival. The latter is a weekend-long party full of concerts, but also includes snowmobile skipping races on the (unfrozen) river. If the riders go too slow or make too sharp a turn, the snowmobile sinks.

== Notable people ==
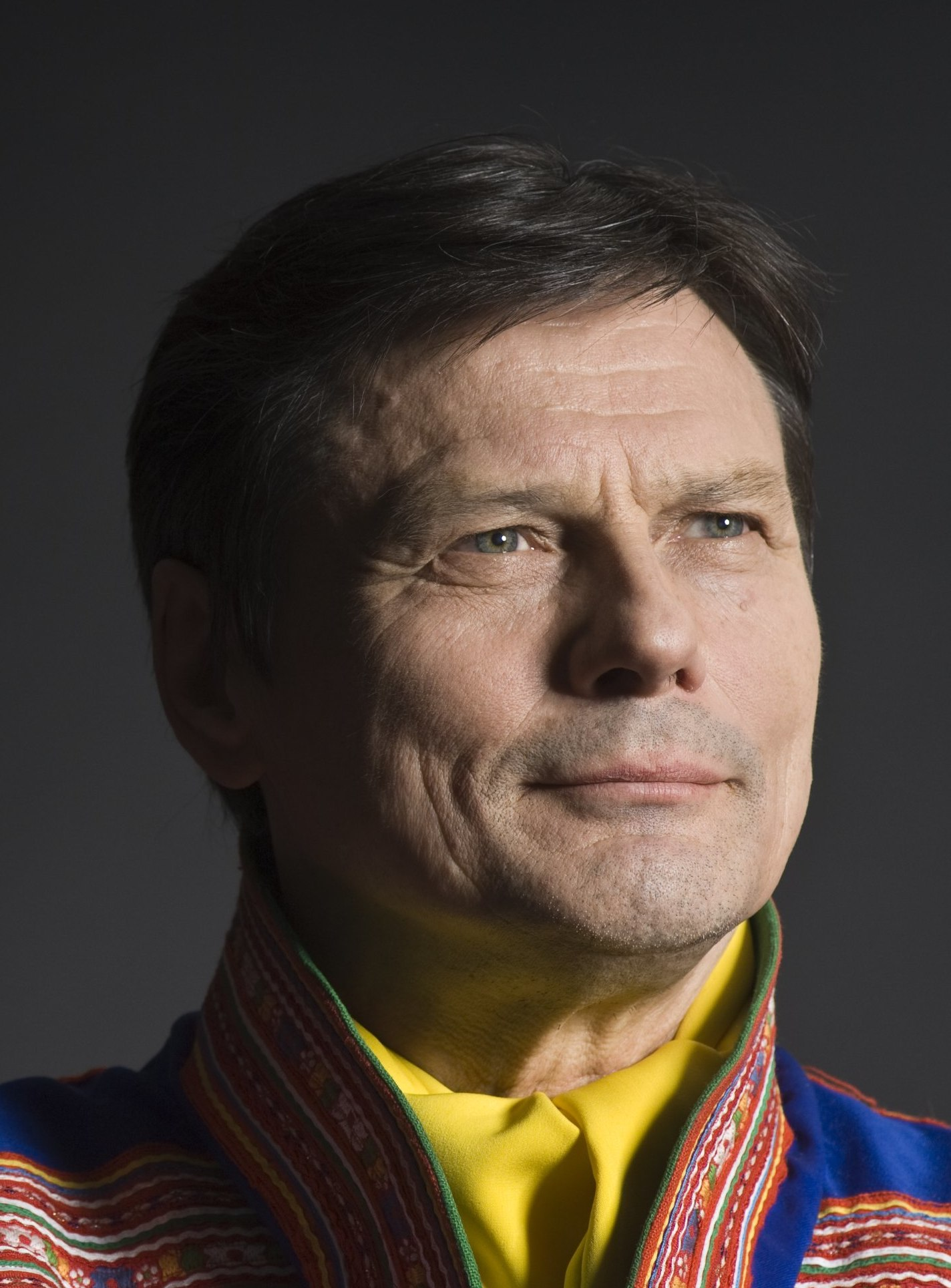
Ole Henrik Magga, 2009

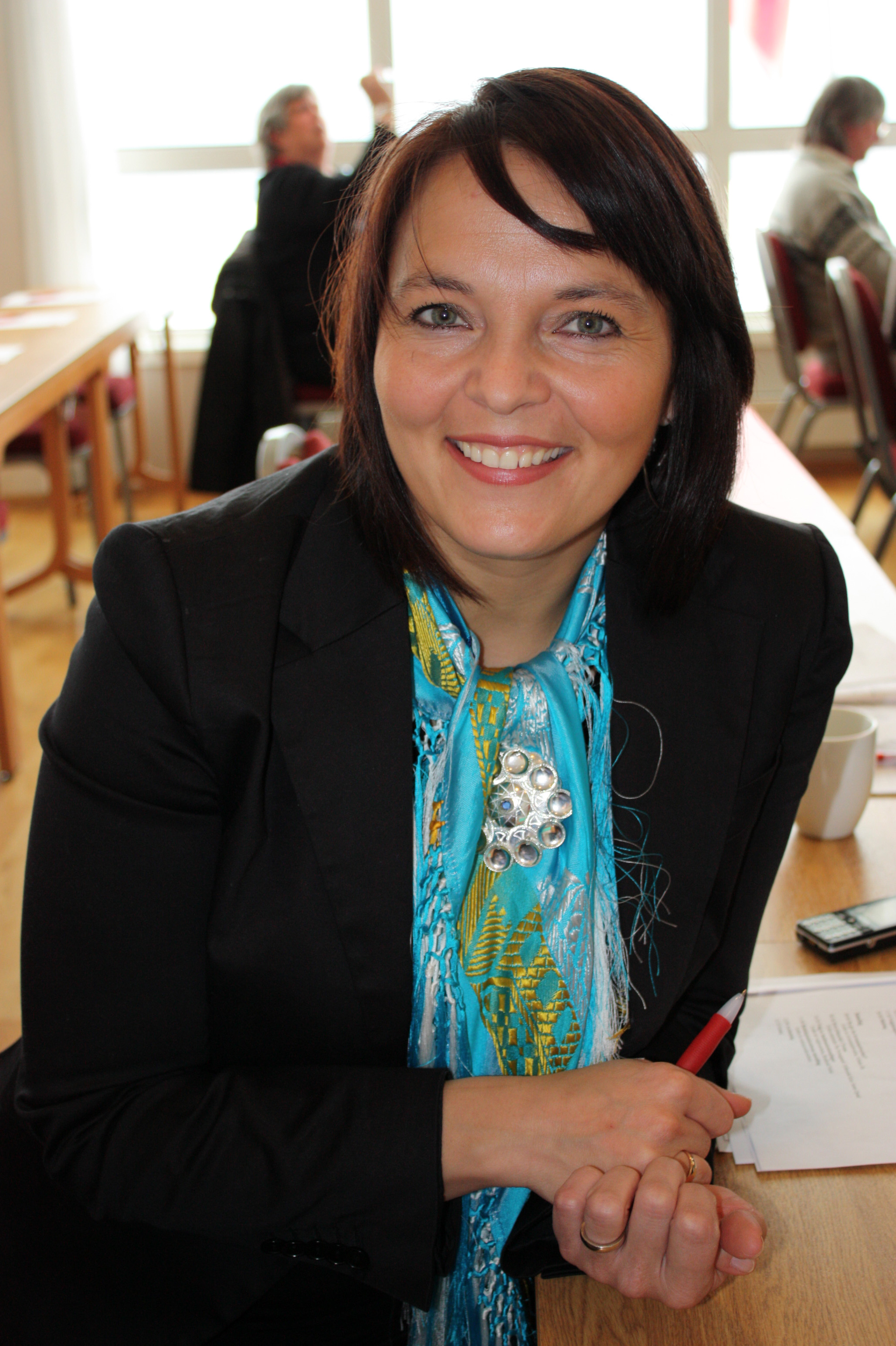
Barbro-Lill Hætta-Jakobsen, 2009

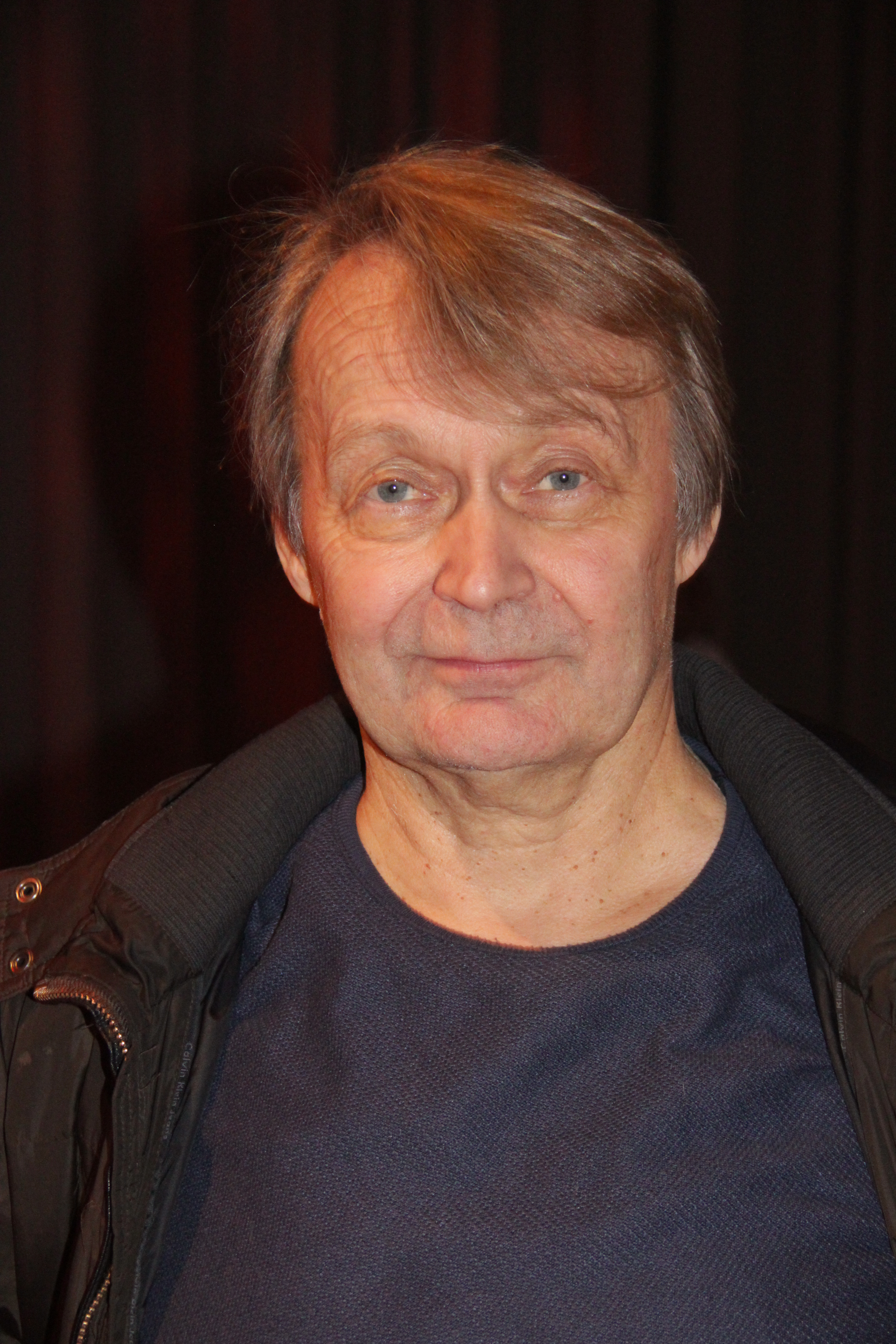
Nils Gaup, 2017

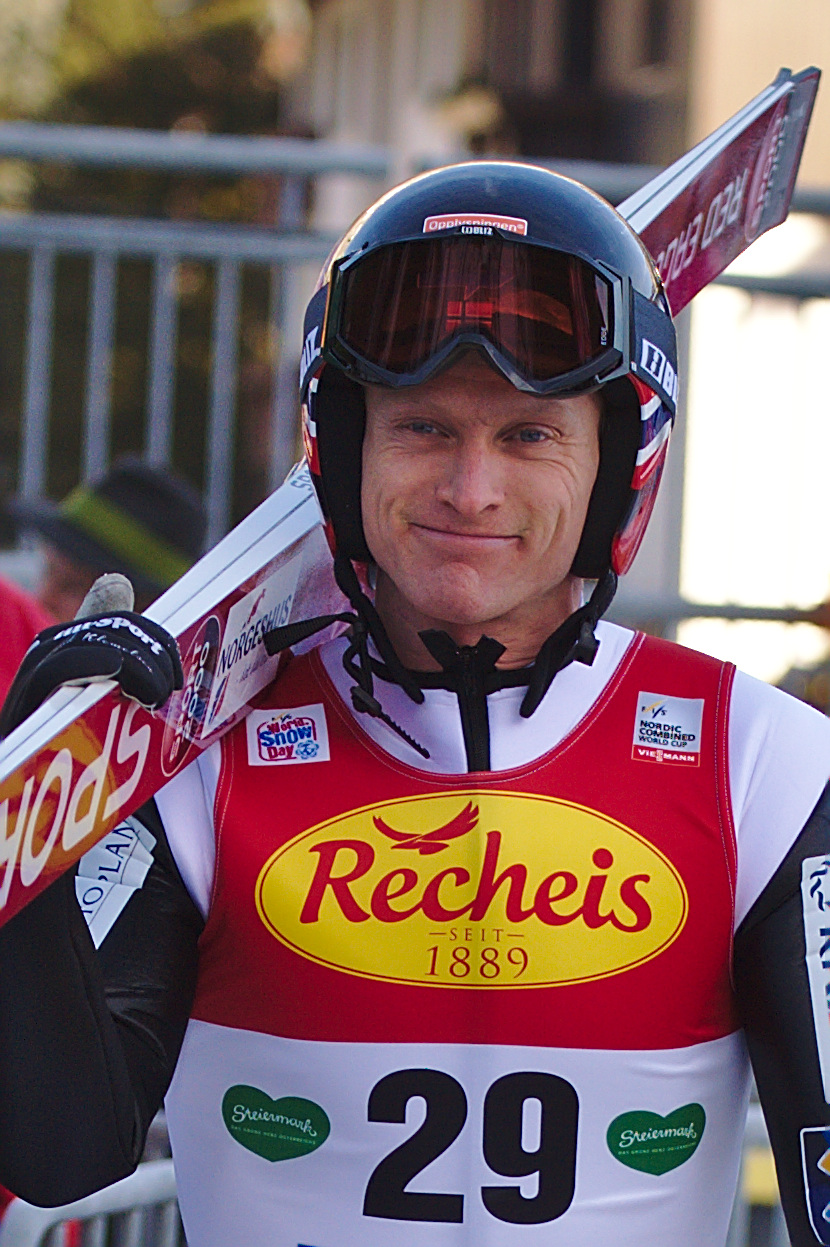
Håvard Klemetsen, 2016

=== 1852 Kautokeino uprising ===
- Aslak Hætta (1824–1854), a leader of the Sami revolt in Guovdageaidnu, called the Kautokeino Rebellion
- Mons Somby (1825 in Kautokeino – 1854), a leader of the Sami rioters
- Ellen Aslaksdatter Skum (1827 in Kautokeino – 1895), a Norwegian Sami reindeer herder, who took part in the 1852 Kautokeino uprising
- Lars Hætta (1834 in Kautokeino – 1896), a Norwegian Sami reindeer herder, prisoner, wood carver and Bible translator

=== Public Service ===
- Johan Turi (1854 in Kautokeino – 1936), the first Sami author to publish a secular work in a Sami language
- Edel Hætta Eriksen (born 1921 in Kautokeino – 2023), a teacher and politician
- Lajla Mattsson Magga (born 1942), a Southern Sami teacher, children's writer, and lexicographer who lives in Kautokeino
- Ole Henrik Magga (born 1947), a Sámi linguist, professor, and politician who was the first president of the Sami Parliament of Norway and currently the president of the United Nations Permanent Forum on Indigenous Issues
- Ellen Inga O. Hætta (born 1953 in Kautokeino – 2023), a Norwegian Sami school principal and politician
- Berit Marie Eira (born 1968), a Norwegian Sami reindeer owner and politician who works in Kautokeino municipality
- Unni Turrettini (born 1972 in Kautokeino), a writer, lawyer, citizen activist, international speaker and author of The Mystery of the Lone Wolf Killer: Anders Behring Breivik and the Threat of Terror in Plain Sight.
- Barbro-Lill Hætta-Jacobsen (born 1972 in Kautokeino), a physician and Norwegian politician
- Inger Elin Utsi (born 1975), a Norwegian-Sami politician and actor who grew up in Kautokeino and lives in Alta
- Láilá Susanne Vars (born 1976 in Láhpoluoppal), a Norwegian-Sami lawyer and former politician, academic, and first Sámi women to achieve a PhD in law, expert member of the United Nations Permanent Forum on Indigenous Issues

=== The arts ===
- Ailo Gaup (1944 in Kautokeino – 2014), a Sámi author who was involved in founding the Sámi theater Beaivváš Sámi Theatre
- Nils Gaup (born 1955 in Kautokeino), a Sámi film director and Academy Award nominee for Pathfinder
- Ellen Marie Vars (born 1957 in Láhpoluoppal), a Norwegian Sami writer
- Mattis Hætta (born 1959 in Masi), a Norwegian Sami singer who represented Norway in the Eurovision Song Contest 1980
- Ingor Ánte Áilo Gaup (born 1960 in Kautokeino), a Sámi actor, composer, and folk musician
- Johan Sara (born 1963 in Alta), a Sami musician, composer, producer, teacher, arranger, and actor
- Roger Ludvigsen (born 1965 in Alta), a Sami guitarist, percussionist, and composer from Kautokeino
- Sollaug Sárgon (born 1965 in Kautokeino), a Norwegian Sami poet and child protective pedagogue
- Niko Valkeapää (born 1968 in Enontekiö, Finland), a Sami musician, joiker (Sami folk singer), and winner of the Norwegian Spelemannsprisen in 2004 (lives in Kautokeino)
- Rawdna Carita Eira (born 1970), a Norwegian and Sámi playwright and author who lives in Kautokeino
- Sara Margrethe Oskal (born 1970 in Kautokeino), a Norwegian Sami writer, actress, artisan, director, and film producer
- Máret Ánne Sara (born 1983), a Sami artist and author who lives and works in Kautokeino
- Unni Turrettini (born 1972 in Kautokeino), an attorney, international speaker, and best selling author
- Fred Buljo (born 1988 in Kautokeino), a Sámi rapper and member of supergroup KEiiNO

=== Sport ===
- Håvard Klemetsen (born 1979 in Kautokeino), a Nordic combined skier with a gold and bronze team medals at the FIS Nordic World Ski Championships
