= Sálganjávri =

Lake in Kautokeino, Norway

- Interactive map of the lake
- Location: Kautokeino, Finnmark
- Coordinates: 69.5429°N 23.3587°E
- Basin countries: Norway
- Max. length: 4.5 kilometres (2.8 mi)
- Max. width: 1.5 kilometres (0.93 mi)
- Surface area: 4.55 km^{2} (1.76 sq mi)
- Shore length^{1}: 11.31 kilometres (7.03 mi)
- Surface elevation: 452 metres (1,483 ft)
- References: NVE
- ^{1} Shore length is not a well-defined measure.

Sálganjávri is a lake in Kautokeino Municipality in Finnmark county, Norway. The 4.55-square-kilometre (1.76 sq mi) lake lies on the Finnmarksvidda plateau, about 15 kilometres (9.3 mi) northwest of the village of Masi.

== See also ==
- List of lakes in Norway
