= Geašjávri =

Lake in Kautokeino, Norway

- Interactive map of the lake
- Location: Finnmark
- Coordinates: 69.2474°N 23.0075°E
- Basin countries: Norway
- Max. length: 5 kilometres (3.1 mi)
- Max. width: 3 kilometres (1.9 mi)
- Surface area: 4.85 km^{2} (1.87 sq mi)
- Shore length^{1}: 22.67 kilometres (14.09 mi)
- Surface elevation: 540 metres (1,770 ft)
- References: NVE
- ^{1} Shore length is not a well-defined measure.

Geašjávri is a lake in Kautokeino Municipality in Finnmark county, Norway. The 4.85-square-kilometre (1.87 sq mi) lake lies on the Finnmarksvidda plateau, about 25 kilometres (16 mi) north of the village of Kautokeino.

== See also ==
- List of lakes in Norway
