= Láhpoluoppal Chapel =

- Láhpoluoppal kapell
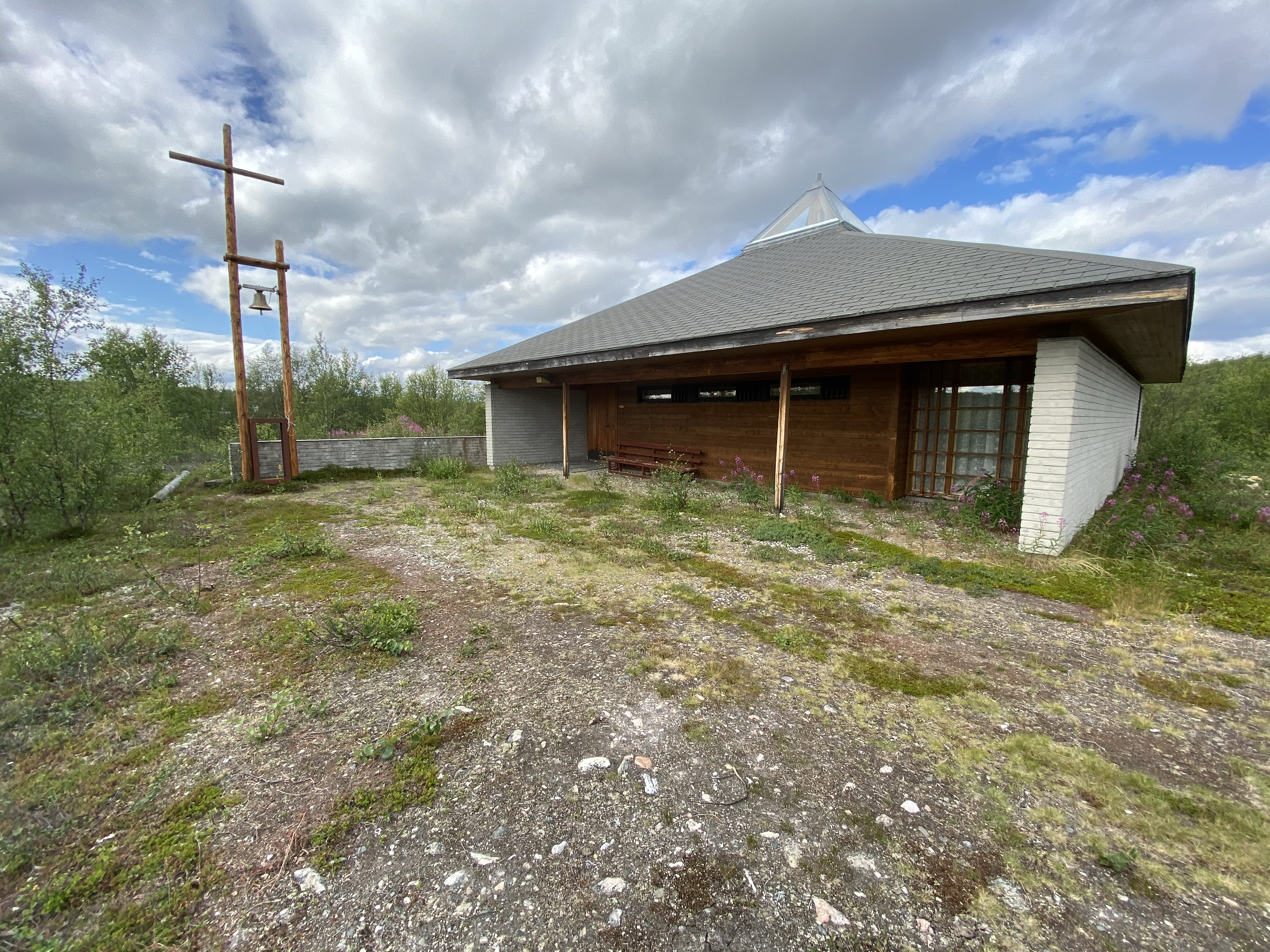
- View of the chapel
- Láhpoluoppal Chapel
- 69.209521°N 23.761240°E
- Location: Kautokeino Municipality, Finnmark
- Country: Norway
- Denomination: Church of Norway
- Churchmanship: Evangelical Lutheran

History
- Status: Chapel
- Founded: 1967
- Consecrated: 1967

Architecture
- Functional status: Active
- Architect: Nils Henrik Eggen
- Architectural type: Long church
- Completed: 1967 (59 years ago)

Specifications
- Capacity: 70
- Materials: Brick

Administration
- Diocese: Nord-Hålogaland
- Deanery: Indre Finnmark prosti
- Parish: Kautokeino
- Norwegian Cultural Heritage Site
- Type: Church
- Status: Not protected
- ID: 84908

Láhpoluoppal Chapel (Norwegian: Láhpoluoppal kapell) is a chapel of the Church of Norway in Kautokeino Municipality in Finnmark county, Norway. It is located in the village of Láhpoluoppal. It is an annex chapel for the Kautokeino parish which is part of the Indre Finnmark prosti (deanery) in the Diocese of Nord-Hålogaland.

The mountain church has clear and simple lines. The building was constructed out of brick with a few small windows. The church has a square-shaped ground plan and is topped by a pyramid roof with a skylight window. The church was built in 1967 using plans by the architect Nils Henrik Eggen. The church seats about 70 people.

== See also ==
- List of churches in Nord-Hålogaland
