= Latnetjávri =

Lake in Kautokeino, Norway

- Interactive map of the lake
- Location: Kautokeino, Finnmark
- Coordinates: 69.5283°N 23.7081°E
- Basin countries: Norway
- Max. length: 8 kilometres (5.0 mi)
- Max. width: 670 metres (2,200 ft)
- Surface area: 3.95 km^{2} (1.53 sq mi)
- Shore length^{1}: 30.43 kilometres (18.91 mi)
- Surface elevation: 265 metres (869 ft)
- References: NVE
- ^{1} Shore length is not a well-defined measure.

Latnetjávri is a lake in Kautokeino Municipality in Finnmark county, Norway. The 3.95-square-kilometre (1.53 sq mi) lake lies on the Kautokeinoelva river, about 10 kilometres (6.2 mi) north of the village of Masi.

== See also ==
- List of lakes in Norway
