= Gavdnjajávri =

Lake in Kautokeino, Norway

- Interactive map of the lake
- Location: Finnmark
- Coordinates: 68.742°N 24.591°E
- Basin countries: Norway
- Max. length: 4 kilometres (2.5 mi)
- Max. width: 1.4 kilometres (0.87 mi)
- Surface area: 3.91 km^{2} (1.51 sq mi)
- Shore length^{1}: 17 kilometres (11 mi)
- Surface elevation: 443 metres (1,453 ft)
- References: NVE
- ^{1} Shore length is not a well-defined measure.

Gavdnjajávri is a lake in Guovdageaidnu Municipality in Finnmark county, Norway. The 3.91-square-kilometre (1.51 sq mi) lake lies on the Finnmarksvidda plateau inside Anárjohka National Park, about 5 kilometres (3.1 mi) north of the Norway-Finland border.

== See also ==
- List of lakes in Norway
