= Nuorbejávri =

Lake in Norway

- Interactive map of the lake
- Location: Kautokeino, Finnmark
- Coordinates: 69.5516°N 23.9826°E
- Basin countries: Norway
- Max. length: 3.5 kilometres (2.2 mi)
- Max. width: 1.3 kilometres (0.81 mi)
- Surface area: 2.33 km^{2} (0.90 sq mi)
- Shore length^{1}: 12.39 kilometres (7.70 mi)
- Surface elevation: 435 metres (1,427 ft)
- References: NVE
- ^{1} Shore length is not a well-defined measure.

Nuorbejávri is a lake in Kautokeino Municipality in Finnmark county, Norway. The 2.33-square-kilometre (0.90 sq mi) lake lies on the Finnmarksvidda plateau, about 18 kilometres (11 mi) northeast of the village of Máze and about 10 kilometres (6.2 mi) southwest of the large lake Iešjávri.

== See also ==
- List of lakes in Norway
