= Rágesjávri =

Lake in Kautokeino, Norway

- Interactive map of the lake
- Location: Kautokeino, Finnmark
- Coordinates: 69.5411°N 24.1710°E
- Basin countries: Norway
- Max. length: 4.7 kilometres (2.9 mi)
- Max. width: 2 kilometres (1.2 mi)
- Surface area: 4.38 km^{2} (1.69 sq mi)
- Shore length^{1}: 16.81 kilometres (10.45 mi)
- Surface elevation: 391 metres (1,283 ft)
- References: NVE
- ^{1} Shore length is not a well-defined measure.

Rágesjávri is a lake in Kautokeino Municipality in Finnmark county, Norway. The 4.38-square-kilometre (1.69 sq mi) lake lies on the Finnmarksvidda plateau, about 22 kilometres (14 mi) northeast of the village of Máze and about 22 kilometres (14 mi) south of the large lake of Iešjávri.

== See also ==
- List of lakes in Norway
