= Flyvarjávri =

Small lake in Kautokeino, Finnmark, Norway

Coordinates: 68°54′38″N 23°06′55″E

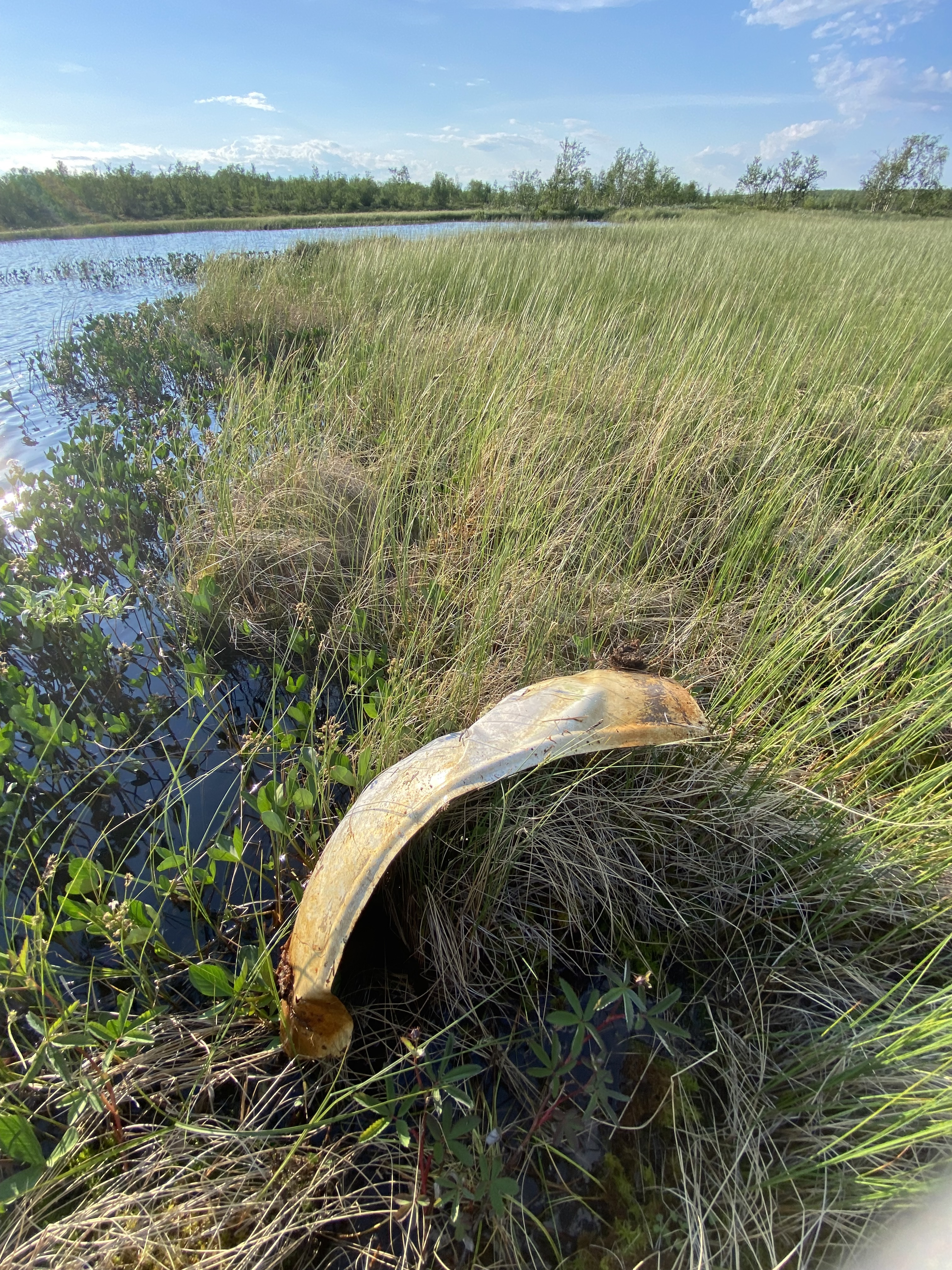
The crash site, July 2021

Flyvarjávri is a small lake situated in Kautokeino Municipality in Finnmark, Norway, about 13 kilometers (8.1 mi) south of the village of Kautokeino. The lake is right next to the E45.

A literal translatation of Flyvarjávri from the Sámi language is "the plane lake". It got this name a German Focke-Wulf Fw 189 A "Uho" reconnaissance aircraft crashed there on 15 October 1944. Eyewitnesses observed the plane flying from the south, low over of Siebe, a village 5 kilometers (3.1 mi) south of Flyvárjavri. The plane went through the ice during the emergency landing, and the German occupation forces machine-gunned the plane before blowing it up when it became clear that it could not be salvaged. There was a crew of two in the plane and both survived. The pilot may have been Lt. Friedrich Drexel. In 1993, the wreck was removed from the accident site and sent to England. Where the plane came from and was on its way to is not known.
