= Dátkojávri =

Lake in Kautokeino, Norway

- Interactive map of the lake
- Location: Finnmark
- Coordinates: 69.2874°N 23.2584°E
- Basin countries: Norway
- Max. length: 5.4 kilometres (3.4 mi)
- Max. width: 1.3 kilometres (0.81 mi)
- Surface area: 4.22 km^{2} (1.63 sq mi)
- Shore length^{1}: 15.25 kilometres (9.48 mi)
- Surface elevation: 474 metres (1,555 ft)
- References: NVE
- ^{1} Shore length is not a well-defined measure.

Dátkojávri is a lake in Kautokeino Municipality in Finnmark county, Norway. The 4.22-square-kilometre (1.63 sq mi) lake lies on the Finnmarksvidda plateau, about 30 kilometres (19 mi) north of the village of Kautokeino.

== See also ==
- List of lakes in Norway
