= Čárajávri =

Lake in Kautokeino, Norway

- Interactive map of the lake
- Location: Finnmark
- Coordinates: 69.4199°N 22.8795°E
- Basin countries: Norway
- Max. length: 7 kilometres (4.3 mi)
- Max. width: 2.8 kilometres (1.7 mi)
- Surface area: 7.03 km^{2} (2.71 sq mi)
- Shore length^{1}: 23 kilometres (14 mi)
- Surface elevation: 611 metres (2,005 ft)
- References: NVE
- ^{1} Shore length is not a well-defined measure.

Čárajávri is a lake in Guovdageainnu Municipality in Finnmark county, Norway. The 7-square-kilometre (2.7 sq mi) lake lies on the Finnmarksvidda plateau, about 30 kilometres (19 mi) west of the village of Masi.

== See also ==
- List of lakes in Norway
