= Heammojávri =

Lake in Kautokeino, Norway

- Interactive map of the lake
- Location: Finnmark
- Coordinates: 69.1696°N 23.4596°E
- Primary inflows: Kautokeinoelva
- Primary outflows: Kautokeinoelva
- Basin countries: Norway
- Surface area: 10.94 km^{2} (4.22 sq mi)
- Shore length^{1}: 74.7 kilometres (46.4 mi)
- Surface elevation: 301 metres (988 ft)
- References: NVE
- ^{1} Shore length is not a well-defined measure.

Heammojávri (or historically: Hæmmujávri) is a lake in Kautokeino Municipality in Finnmark county, Norway. The 10.9-square-kilometre (4.2 sq mi) lake is part of the river Kautokeinoelva, along the European route E45.

== See also ==
- List of lakes in Norway
