= Geađgejávri =

Lake in Kautokeino, Norway

- Interactive map of the lake
- Location: Finnmark
- Coordinates: 68.6811°N 23.2981°E
- Basin countries: Norway
- Max. length: 4.6 kilometres (2.9 mi)
- Max. width: 1.7 kilometres (1.1 mi)
- Surface area: 4.76 km^{2} (1.84 sq mi)
- Shore length^{1}: 13.9 kilometres (8.6 mi)
- Surface elevation: 387 metres (1,270 ft)
- References: NVE
- ^{1} Shore length is not a well-defined measure.

Geađgejávri is a lake in Guovdageainnu Municipality in Finnmark county, Norway. The 4.76-square-kilometre (1.84 sq mi) lake lies on the Finnmarksvidda plateau, immediately north of the Finland–Norway border, along European route E45.

== See also ==
- List of lakes in Norway
