= Bajášjávri =

Lake in Kautokeino, Norway

- Interactive map of the lake
- Location: Finnmark
- Coordinates: 68.7465°N 23.6865°E
- Basin countries: Norway
- Max. length: 4 kilometres (2.5 mi)
- Max. width: 2.7 kilometres (1.7 mi)
- Surface area: 6.3 km^{2} (2.4 sq mi)
- Shore length^{1}: 14.8 kilometres (9.2 mi)
- Surface elevation: 414 metres (1,358 ft)
- References: NVE
- ^{1} Shore length is not a well-defined measure.

Bajášjávri is a lake in Guovdageainnu Municipality in Finnmark county, Norway. The 6.3-square-kilometre (2.4 sq mi) lake lies on the Finnmarksvidda plateau, about 800 metres (2,600 ft) west of the border with Finland.

== See also ==
- List of lakes in Norway
