= Biggejávri =

Lake in Kautokeino, Norway

- Location within Finnmark Location within Norway
- Interactive map of the lake
- Location: Finnmark
- Coordinates: 69.3367°N 23.4646°E
- Basin countries: Norway
- Max. length: 5 kilometres (3.1 mi)
- Max. width: 1.8 kilometres (1.1 mi)
- Surface area: 5.33 km^{2} (2.06 sq mi)
- Shore length^{1}: 13.72 kilometres (8.53 mi)
- Surface elevation: 381 metres (1,250 ft)
- References: NVE
- ^{1} Shore length is not a well-defined measure.

Biggejávri is a lake in Kautokeino Municipality in Finnmark county, Norway. The 5.33-square-kilometre (2.06 sq mi) lake lies on the Finnmarksvidda plateau, about 11 kilometres (6.8 mi) southwest of the village of Masi.

== See also ==
- List of lakes in Norway
