= Soagŋojávri =

Lake in Kautokeino, Norway

- Interactive map of the lake
- Location: Kautokeino, Finnmark
- Coordinates: 69.4633°N 23.1450°E
- Basin countries: Norway
- Max. length: 6 kilometres (3.7 mi)
- Max. width: 1 kilometre (0.62 mi)
- Surface area: 4.02 km^{2} (1.55 sq mi)
- Shore length^{1}: 26.78 kilometres (16.64 mi)
- Surface elevation: 469 metres (1,539 ft)
- References: NVE
- ^{1} Shore length is not a well-defined measure.

Soagŋojávri is a lake in Kautokeino Municipality in Finnmark county, Norway. The 4.02-square-kilometre (1.55 sq mi) lake lies on the Finnmarksvidda plateau, about 20 kilometres (12 mi) west of the village of Masi.

== See also ==
- List of lakes in Norway
