= Láhpoluoppal =

- Village
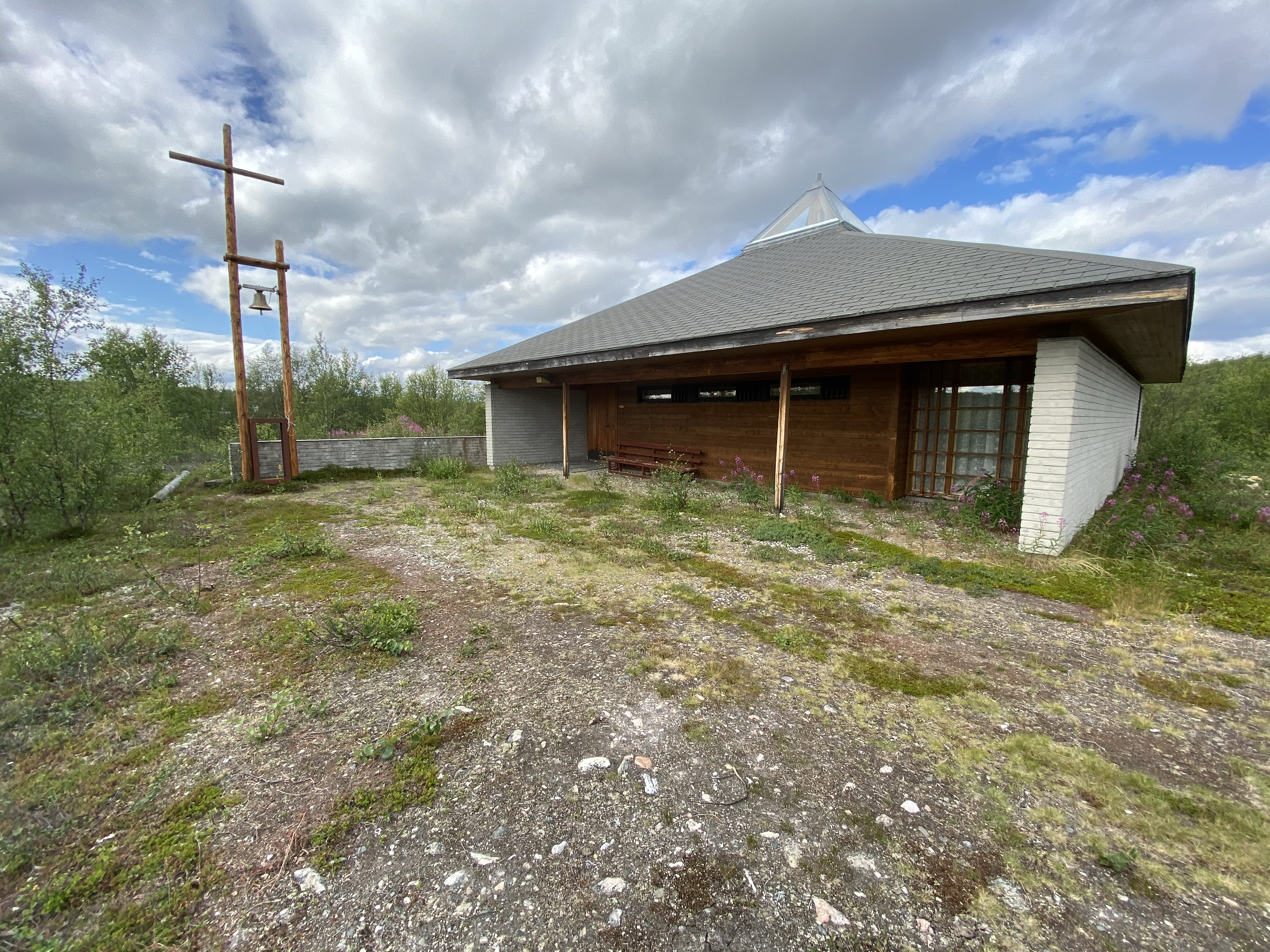
- Lappoluobbal church
- Interactive map of Láhpoluoppal
- Location within Finnmark Location within Norway
- Coordinates: 69°12′31″N 23°45′36″E
- Country: Norway
- Region: Northern Norway
- County: Finnmark
- District: Vest-Finnmark
- Municipality: Kautokeino
- Elevation: 329 m (1,079 ft)
- Time zone: UTC+01:00 (CET)
  - Summer (DST): UTC+02:00 (CEST)
- Post Code: 9520 Kautokeino

Láhpoluoppal is a village in Kautokeino Municipality in Finnmark county, Norway. The village is located at the southern end of the large lake Láhpojávri, along the Norwegian National Road 92. The small village lies on the vast Finnmarksvidda plateau, about half-way between the villages of Masi and Kautokeino. The Láhpoluoppal Chapel is located in the village. Láhpoluoppal has also been mentioned a few times in Honningsvågrevyen
