= Stuorajávri (Kautokeino) =

Lake in Kautokeino, Norway

- Interactive map of the lake
- Location: Kautokeino, Finnmark
- Coordinates: 69.1470°N 22.7914°E
- Basin countries: Norway
- Max. length: 16 kilometres (9.9 mi)
- Max. width: 3.7 kilometres (2.3 mi)
- Surface area: 23.71 km^{2} (9.15 sq mi)
- Shore length^{1}: 81.16 kilometres (50.43 mi)
- Surface elevation: 374 metres (1,227 ft)
- References: NVE
- ^{1} Shore length is not a well-defined measure.

Stuorajávri is a lake in Kautokeino Municipality in Finnmark county, Norway. The 23.71-square-kilometre (9.15 sq mi) lake lies on the Finnmarksvidda plateau, about 11 kilometres (6.8 mi) northwest of the village of Kautokeino.

== See also ==
- List of lakes in Norway
