= Ailo Gaup (author) =

Sámi author (1944 - 2014)

Ailo Gaup (18 June 1944, in Kautokeino – 24 September 2014, in Norway) was a Sámi author who wrote in Norwegian. He lived in Oslo. He was involved in founding the Sámi theater Beaivváš Sámi Theatre in Kautokeino and also wrote plays for the theater. His novels have been translated into English, German, French and Polish.

He made his debut as a poet in 1982 with the collection of poems Joiken og kniven, followed by the collections I Stallos natt (1984) and Under dobbelt Stjernehimmel (1986). Gaup depicts the lives and culture of the Sami people and their struggle to survive as a people. The novel Trommereisen (1988) and the independent sequel Natten mellem dagene(1992) depicts encounters between modern society and the Sami mythical conception of nature that is linked to the knowledge of the graces.

Gaup has also made many sound recordings with Sami lyrics and music.

== Bibliography ==
=== Fiction ===
==== Novels ====
- Trommereisen (1988)
- Natten mellom dagene (1992)

==== Poetry ====
- Joiken og kniven (1982)
- I Stallos natt (1984)
- Under dobbel stjernehimmel (1986)

==== Plays ====
- Min duoddarat (Våre vidder) (1983) - lines for a Sámi musical.
- Gullspråket (1990) - play.

=== Non-fiction ===
- Sjamansonen (2005)
- Inn i naturen (2007)
