= Barbro-Lill Hætta-Jacobsen =

Norwegian politician

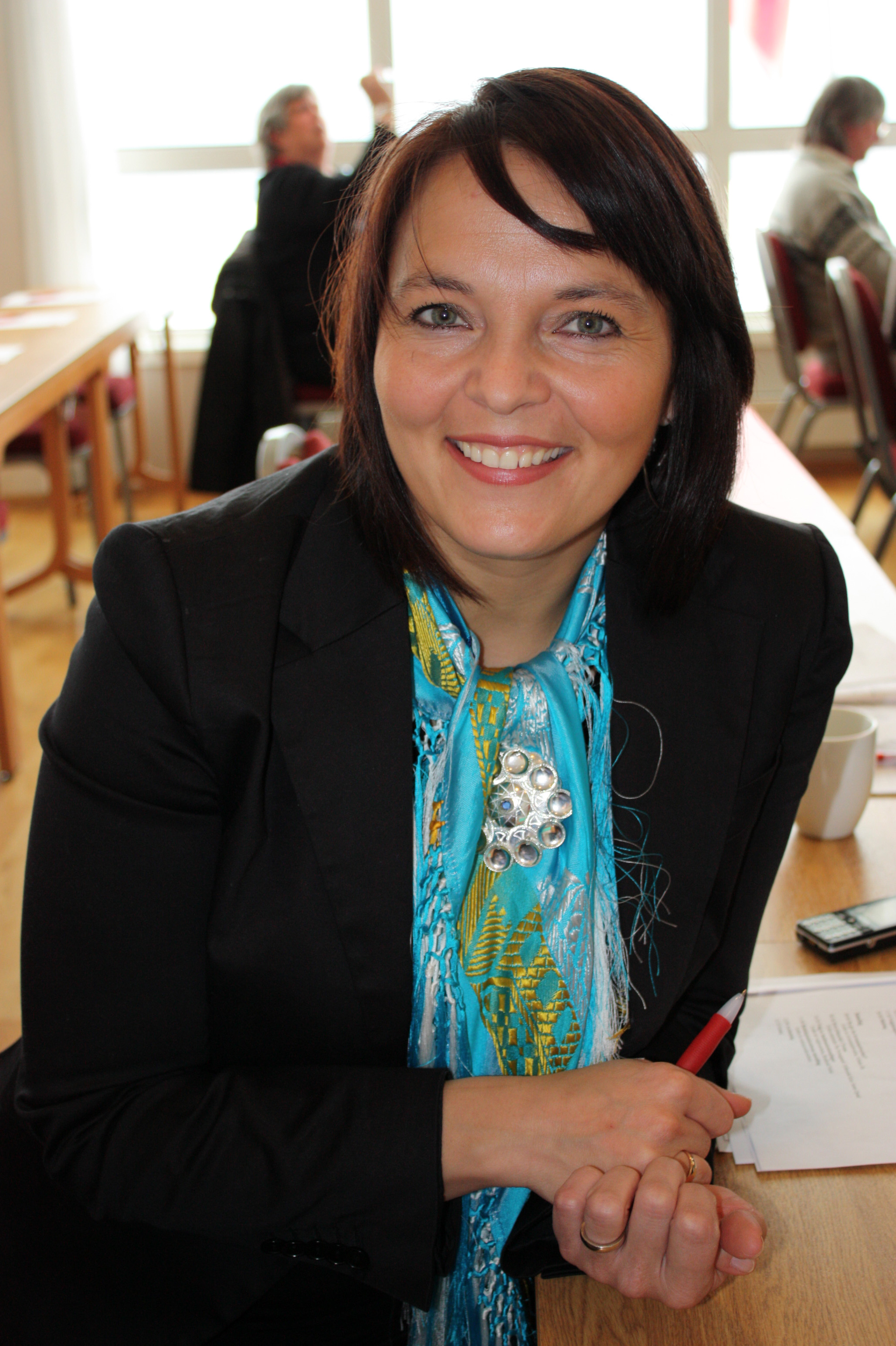
Barbro-Lill Hætta-Jacobsen

Barbro Lill Hætta-Jacobsen (born 23 April 1972) is a Norwegian politician for the Labour Party.

During the cabinet Jagland, she was appointed political advisor in the Ministry of Local Government.

A physician by education, Hætta became a municipal doctor in Harstad Municipality, where in 2003 she was elected to the municipal council for Harstad Municipality. In 2005 she became deputy mayor, succeeding Kari-Anne Opsal who was appointed political advisor in the Ministry of Fisheries and Coastal Affairs.

Hætta served in the position of deputy representative to the Norwegian Parliament from Finnmark during the term 2001–2005.

In 2007 she had an unsuccessfully candidacy for vice president of the Norwegian Olympic Committee and Confederation of Sports.

She hails from Kautokeino Municipality and is of Sami ethnicity.
