= Karasjok =

Karasjok is a Norwegianized version of the Northern Sami name Kárášjohka. Either one may refer to the following places:

- Karasjok Municipality or Kárášjohka, a municipality in Finnmark county, Norway
- Karasjok (village) or Kárášjohka, a village in Karasjok Municipality in Finnmark county, Norway
- Karasjohka or Kárášjohka, a river in Finnmark county, Norway
- Karasjok Church, a church in Karasjok Municipality in Finnmark county, Norway
- Old Karasjok Church, a church in Karasjok Municipality in Finnmark county, Norway
