= Dorvonjárga =

Dorvonjárga (Northern Sami)
- Village
- Interactive map of Dorvonjárga (Northern Sami)
- Location within Finnmark Location within Norway
- Coordinates: 69°24′01″N 25°49′39″E
- Country: Norway
- Region: Northern Norway
- County: Finnmark
- District: Vest-Finnmark
- Municipality: Karasjok
- Elevation: 149 m (489 ft)
- Time zone: UTC+01:00 (CET)
  - Summer (DST): UTC+02:00 (CEST)
- Post Code: 9730 Karasjok

Dorvonjárga is a village in Karasjok Municipality in Finnmark county, Norway. The village is located in the eastern part of the municipality, along the Finland–Norway border. The village lies about 15 kilometres (9.3 mi) to the southeast of the village of Karasjok. The village is the site of one of the official border crossings between Norway and Finland. The border crossing goes over the Anarjohka river between Dorvonjárga and Karigasniemi in Finland.
