= Gásadatjávri =

Lake in Karasjok, Norway

- Interactive map of the lake
- Location: Finnmark
- Coordinates: 69.7313°N 24.3029°E
- Basin countries: Norway
- Max. length: 5 kilometres (3.1 mi)
- Max. width: 800 metres (2,600 ft)
- Surface area: 2.56 km^{2} (0.99 sq mi)
- Shore length^{1}: 21.66 kilometres (13.46 mi)
- Surface elevation: 396 metres (1,299 ft)
- References: NVE
- ^{1} Shore length is not a well-defined measure.

Gásadatjávri is a lake in Karasjok Municipality in Finnmark county, Norway. The 2.56-square-kilometre (0.99 sq mi) lake lies on the Finnmarksvidda plateau, about 500 metres (1,600 ft) northeast of the large lake Iešjávri in the northwestern part of the municipality.

== See also ==
- List of lakes in Norway
