= Iešjávri =

Lake in Finnmark, Norway

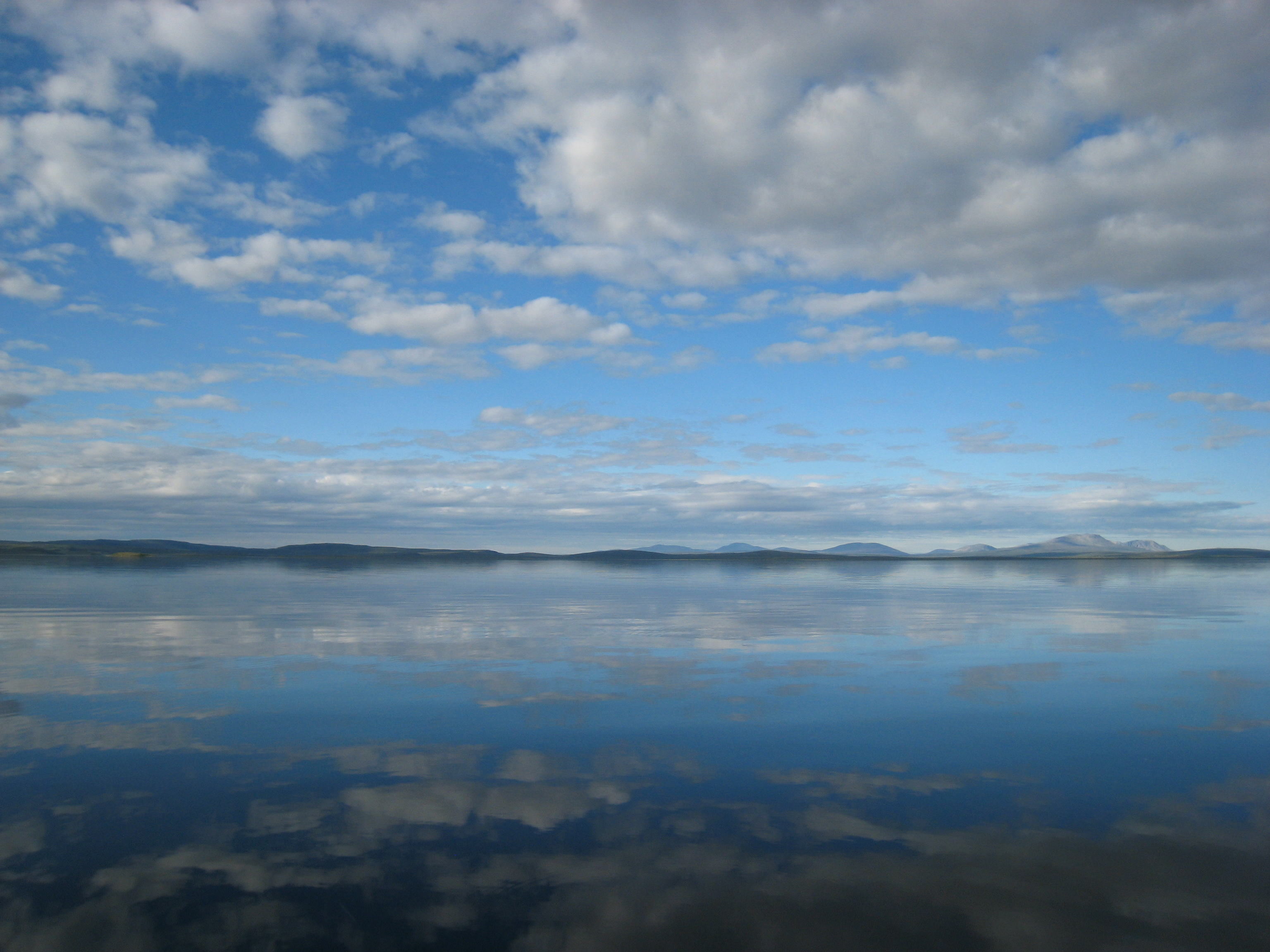
- View of the lake
- Interactive map of the lake
- Location: Finnmark
- Coordinates: 69.6654°N 24.2090°E
- Primary outflows: River Iešjohka
- Basin countries: Norway
- Max. length: 13 kilometres (8.1 mi)
- Max. width: 10 kilometres (6.2 mi)
- Surface area: 68.16 km^{2} (26.32 sq mi)
- Average depth: 4 metres (13 ft)
- Max. depth: 41 metres (135 ft)
- Shore length^{1}: 164.74 kilometres (102.36 mi)
- Surface elevation: 390 metres (1,280 ft)
- References: NVE
- ^{1} Shore length is not a well-defined measure.

Iešjávri is a large lake in Finnmark county, Norway. The lake lies on the Finnmarksvidda plateau along the border of three municipalities: Alta, Kautokeino, and Karasjok. The lake is about 50 kilometres (31 mi) northwest of the village of Karasjok, about 30 kilometres (19 mi) northeast of the village of Masi, and about 45 kilometres (28 mi) southeast of the town of Alta.

The 68.16-square-kilometre (26.32 sq mi) lake is the largest in the county and has a length of over 13 kilometres (8.1 mi) from north to south. The lake has a maximum depth of 41 metres (135 ft) and an average depth of 4 metres (13 ft), making it a characteristic Baltic Shield lake. The lake flows out into the river Iešjohka, a tributary of the large river Karasjohka.

== See also ==
- List of lakes in Norway
