= Čorotjávri =

Lake in Karasjok, Norway

- Interactive map of the lake
- Location: Finnmark
- Coordinates: 69.4973°N 24.4089°E
- Basin countries: Norway
- Max. length: 4.5 kilometres (2.8 mi)
- Max. width: 1.6 kilometres (0.99 mi)
- Surface area: 4 km^{2} (1.5 sq mi)
- Shore length^{1}: 17.13 kilometres (10.64 mi)
- Surface elevation: 387 metres (1,270 ft)
- References: NVE
- ^{1} Shore length is not a well-defined measure.

Čorotjávri is a lake in Karasjok Municipality in Finnmark county, Norway. The 4-square-kilometre (1.5 sq mi) lake lies on the Finnmarksvidda plateau about 15 kilometres (9.3 mi) north of the small village of Šuoššjávri, just east of the municipal boundary with Kautokeino Municipality.

== See also ==
- List of lakes in Norway
