= Anarjohka =

Anárjohka
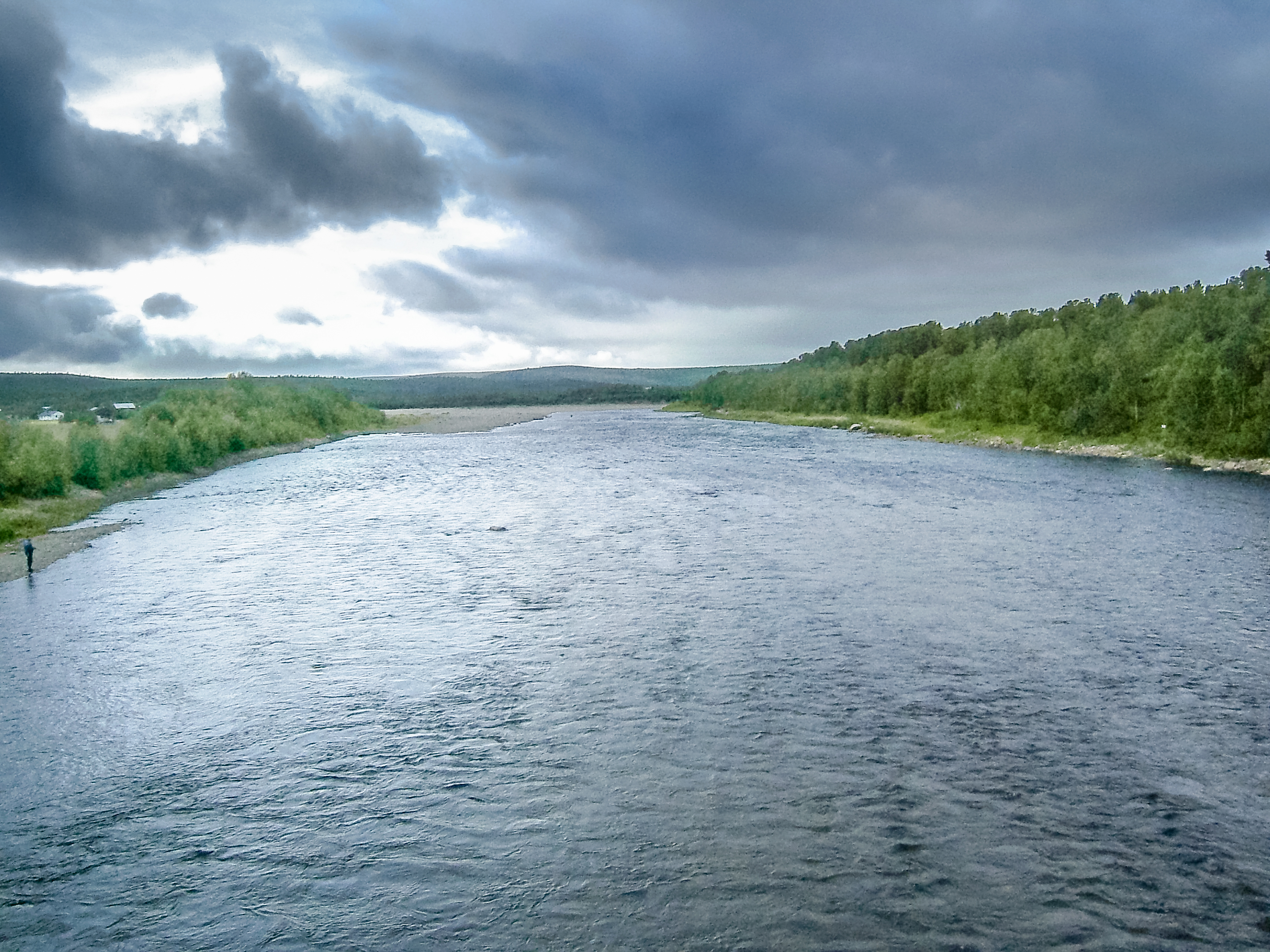
- View of the river at Karigasniemi

Location
- Countries: Norway; Finland
- Counties: Finnmark; Lapland
- Municipalities: Karasjok; Kautokeino; Utsjoki

Physical characteristics
- Source: Lulit Bissovárri (Anárjohka National Park)
  - location: Kautokeino Municipality, Norway
  - coordinates: 68.730°N 24.367°E
  - elevation: 549 metres (1,801 ft)
- Mouth: Tana River
  - location: Karasjok Municipality, Norway
  - coordinates: 69°25′55″N 25°48′26″E
  - elevation: 123 metres (404 ft)
- Length: 152.9 km (95.0 mi)
- Basin size: 3,151.81 km^{2} (1,216.92 sq mi)
- Discharge
  - average: 32.96 m^{3}/s (1,164 cu ft/s)

Basin features
- Tributaries
  - left: Iškorasjohka, Goššjohka, Ássuorgi, Cáskinjohka
  - right: Karigasjoki, Skiehččanjohka

Anarjohka (Northern Sami: Anárjohka, Norwegian: Anarjokka or Anarjohka, Finnish: Inarijoki, Swedish: Enare älv) is a tributary of Tana River. It is about 153 kilometres (95 mi) long, with a drainage area of about 3,152 square kilometres (1,217 mi^{2}). The mean discharge at the mouth is about 33 cubic metres per second (1,200 cu ft/s). The lower part of the river runs along the Finnish–Norwegian border. The border continues along the Anarjohka's tributary Skiehččanjohka, while the upper part of the river lies within the eponymous Anárjohka national park in Norway.

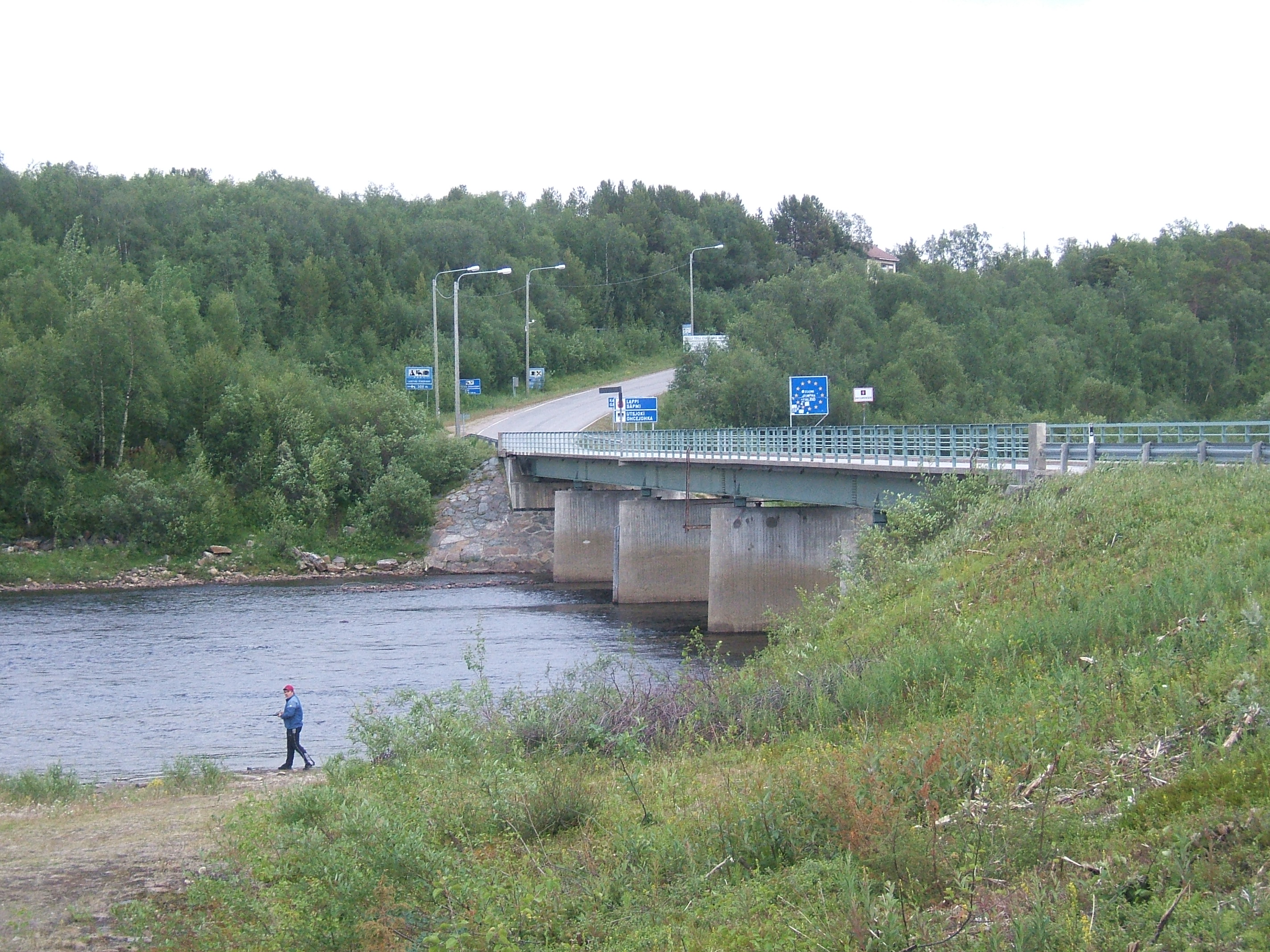
Anárjohka and the bridge to Karigasniemi in Finland

The river has its sources at Lulit Bissovárri, at an elevation of 549 metres (1,801 ft) in Kautokeino Municipality in Finnmark county, Norway, in the far south of the Finnmarksvidda plateau, in the southwestern parts of Anárjohka National Park. From there it flows towards the northeast through the national park, until it turns towards the east and joins the tributary Skiehččanjohkka and the border with Finland, where Lemmenjoki National Park is situated on the opposite side. After Basevuovdi the river turns north, and its largest tributary, the Goššjohka, joins it from the west. The only bridge over the Anarjohka is located at the Finnish village of Karigasniemi. At this border crossing the Norwegian and Finnish national highways meet, both numbered 92. At Raidesuolu, about 5 kilometres (3.1 mi) further north, and some 10 kilometres (6 mi) east of the village of Karasjok, the Anarjohka flows into the river Karasjohka, and together the two rivers form the Tana River.

Karigasniemi, with some 300 inhabitants, is the only settlement of some size along the river. On the Norwegian side, between the border bridge and north to the confluence with Karasjohka, lie the villages of Dorvonjárga and Gámehisnjárga. South of Karigasniemi, the area surrounding the river is very sparsely populated. There are small villages at (from north to south) Iškorasjohka, Jorgastak, and Basevuovdi on the Norwegian side, and at Kuoppaniva, Vuobmaved, and Angeli on the Finnish side. Angeli, which lies opposite Basevouvdi on the Norwegian side, is the largest settlement along the river south of Karigasniemi. Upstream from Basevuovdi / Angeli there are no settlements at all.

Like the Tana, the Anarjohka is a very good river for salmon fishing.

== See also ==
- List of rivers of Norway
- List of rivers of Finland
