= Idjajávri =

Lake in Karasjok, Norway

Idjajávri (Northern Sami) Nattvatnet (Norwegian)
- Interactive map of the lake
- Location: Finnmark
- Coordinates: 69.6282°N 25.2798°E
- Basin countries: Norway
- Max. length: 9 kilometres (5.6 mi)
- Max. width: 3.5 kilometres (2.2 mi)
- Surface area: 10.28 km^{2} (3.97 sq mi)
- Shore length^{1}: 50 kilometres (31 mi)
- Surface elevation: 275 metres (902 ft)
- Islands: numerous islands and islets
- References: NVE
- ^{1} Shore length is not a well-defined measure.

Idjajávri (Northern Sami) or Nattvatnet (Norwegian) is a lake in Karasjok Municipality in Finnmark county, Norway. The 10.28-square-kilometre (3.97 sq mi) lake lies about 16 kilometres (9.9 mi) north of the village of Karasjok. The European route E06 highway crosses a bridge over the lake at the narrowest part of the lake.

== See also ==
- List of lakes in Norway
