= Sámi magasiidna =

Sami periodical

Sámi magasiidna (English translation: Sámi magazine, styled SÁMi magasiidna) is a Sámi periodical that has been published weekly by iSÁMi.Press in Kárášjohka since 2017. It is published in Northern Sámi, Southern Sámi and Norwegian. During 2018 and 2019 the periodical was called Sámi ođasmagasiidna (Sámi news magazine). In 2020, it merged with the Norwegian-language Sett nordfra to form Sámi magasiidna – Sett nordfra.

== Editors ==
- Jan Skoglund Paltto (2017)
- Anne Rasmus (2018)
- Anne Berit Anti (2018 – 2019)
- Anne Rasmus (2020 – )
