= Karasjok Municipality =

Municipality in Finnmark, Norway

Karasjok Municipality Karasjok kommune Kárášjoga gielda Kaarasjoki (Kven)
- Municipality
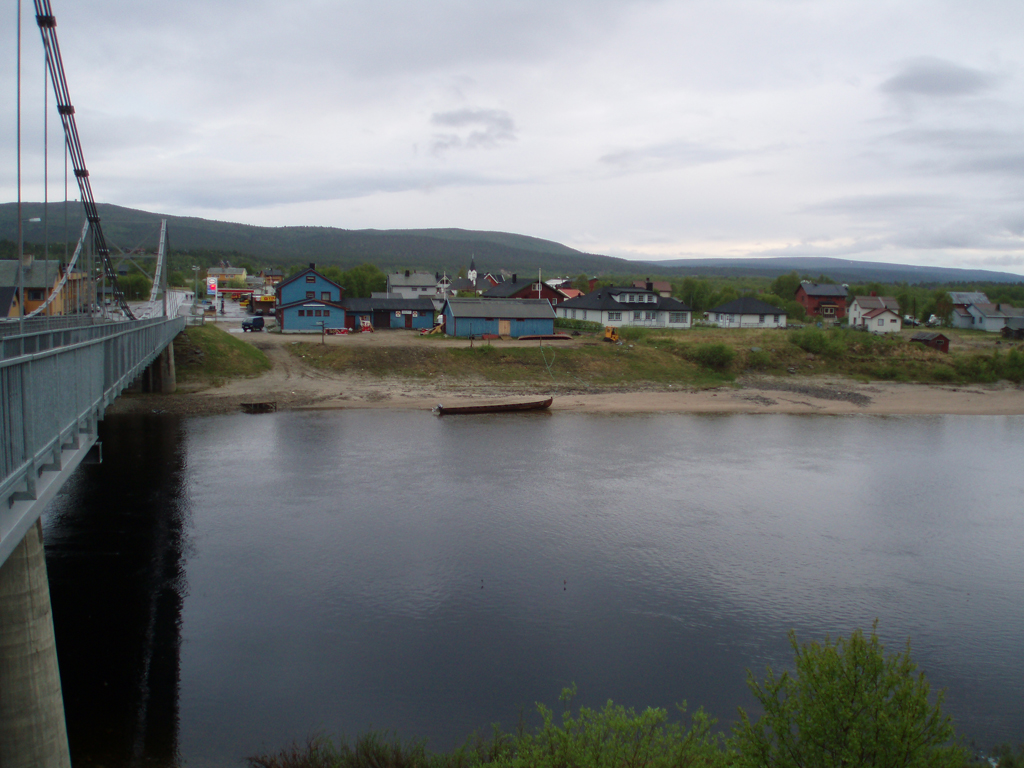
- June 2007 view of Karasjok

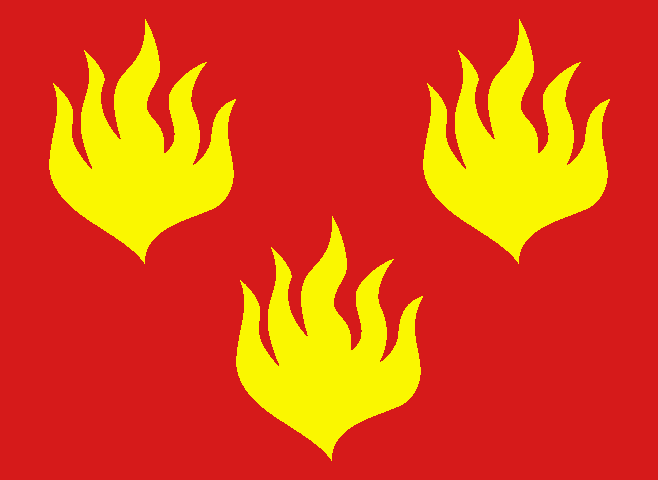
- Flag Coat of arms

- Finnmark within Norway

- Karasjok within Finnmark
- Coordinates: 69°28′55″N 25°06′18″E
- Country: Norway
- County: Finnmark
- Established: 1 Jan 1866
  - Preceded by: Kistrand Municipality
- Administrative centre: Karasjok

Government
  - Mayor (2015): Svein Atle Somby (Ap)

Area
  - Total: 5,452.94 km^{2} (2,105.39 sq mi)
  - Land: 5,210.70 km^{2} (2,011.86 sq mi)
  - Water: 242.24 km^{2} (93.53 sq mi) 4.4%
  - Rank: #2 in Norway
- Highest elevation: 1,024 m (3,360 ft)

Population (2024)
  - Total: 2,565
  - Rank: #250 in Norway
  - Density: 0.5/km^{2} (1.3/sq mi)
  - Change (10 years): ▼ −4.9%
- Demonym: Karasjoking

Official languages
  - Norwegian form: Bokmål
  - Sámi form: Northern Sami
- Time zone: UTC+01:00 (CET)
  - Summer (DST): UTC+02:00 (CEST)
- ISO 3166 code: NO-5610
- Website: Official website

Karasjok or Kárášjohka (Northern Sami; [ˈkʰaːraːʃˌjohka]) (also: Kven: Kaarasjoki) is a municipality in Finnmark county, Norway. The administrative centre of the municipality is the village of Karasjok. Other villages include Dorvonjárga, Šuoššjávri, and Váljohka.

The 5,453-square-kilometre (2,105 sq mi) municipality is the second largest by area out of the 357 municipalities in Norway. Karasjok is the 250th most populous municipality in Norway with a population of 2,565. The municipality's population density is 0.5 inhabitants per square kilometre (1.3/sq mi) and its population has decreased by 4.9% over the previous 10-year period.

A survey conducted on behalf of the Sami Language Council in the year 2000 showed that 94 percent of the population are Sami speakers.

Wildlife: 16 different bears have been in the municipality, during 2025.

== Name ==
The municipal name Karasjok is a Norwegianized form of the Northern Sami language name Kárášjohka. The meaning of the first element is uncertain. It could be káráš which is the Northern Sami word for a wooden food platter, or from the Finnish word, kara, which means "something that sticks". The last element is johka which means "river", whose equivalent in Finnish is joki.

The official name of the municipality was Karasjok until 1990 when it was changed to the bilingual Kárášjohka-Karasjok. It was the third municipality in Norway to get a Sami language name. In 2005, the name was again changed, such that either Kárášjohka or Karasjok can be used interchangeably. The spelling of the Sami language name changes depending on how it is used. It is called Kárášjohka when it is used alone, but it is Kárašjoga gielda when in the phrase meaning "Karasjok Municipality". Kárašjoga gielda literally translates as Karasjok's Commune, -joga being the genitive form of the word -johka.

== Coat of arms ==
The coat of arms was granted on 27 June 1986. The official blazon is "Gules, three five-tongued flames Or two and one" (Norwegian: I rødt tre femtungede gule flamer, 2-1). This means the arms have a red field (background) and the charge is three five-tongued flames with two above one. The flames have a tincture of Or which means it is commonly colored yellow, but if it is made out of metal, then gold is used. The red color and flame designs were chosen as a symbol for the importance of fire to the local (nomadic) Sami people. The fire brings both heat and thus survival during the harsh winters, but it is also a major threat, both in the tents as well as in the large pine forests. The fire is also the point around which people gather and it is a guard against dangers. The flag contains three flames also because Kárásjoga-Karasjok is a place where three peoples live: the Sami, Norwegians, and Kvens.

== History ==
In 2015 the second edition of Sápmi Pride, was held in Karasjok.

=== History of administration ===
The municipality of Karasjok was established on 1 January 1866 when it was separated from the old Kistrand Municipality. Initially, the population of Karasjok was 515. The municipal borders have not changed since that time.

On 1 January 2020, the municipality became part of the newly formed Troms og Finnmark county. Previously, it had been part of the old Finnmark county. On 1 January 2024, the Troms og Finnmark county was divided and the municipality once again became part of Finnmark county.

== Churches ==
The Church of Norway has one parish (sokn) within Karasjok Municipality. It is part of the Indre Finnmark prosti (deanery) in the Diocese of Nord-Hålogaland.

Churches in Karasjok Municipality
Parish (sokn)	Church name	Location of the church	Year built
Karasjok	Karasjok Church	Karasjok	1974
Karasjok	Old Karasjok Church	Karasjok	1807
Karasjok	Suosjavrre Chapel	Šuoššjávri	1968
Karasjok	Valjok Church	Váljohka	1932

== Transportation ==
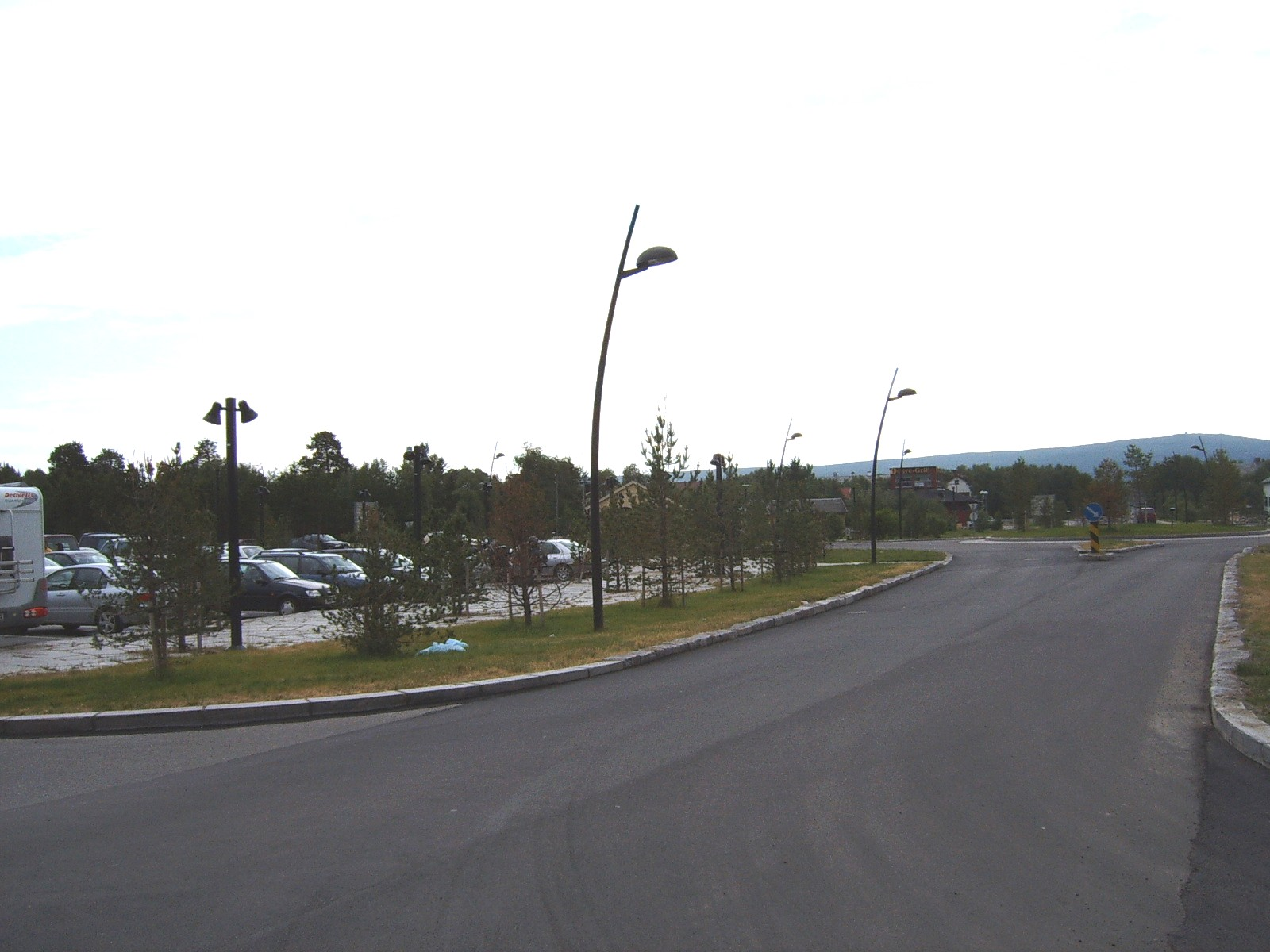
From the centre of Karasjok, July 2005

There is an official border crossing between Dorvonjárga (Norway) and Karigasniemi (Finland), over the Anarjohka river. The European route E6 highway passes through the municipality from Lakselv to Tana bru and Kirkenes in the east. The nearest airport is Lakselv Airport, about 80 kilometres (50 mi) from Karasjok village.

== Government ==
Karasjok Municipality is responsible for primary education (through 10th grade), outpatient health services, senior citizen services, welfare and other social services, zoning, economic development, and municipal roads and utilities. The municipality is governed by a municipal council of directly elected representatives. The mayor is indirectly elected by a vote of the municipal council. The municipality is under the jurisdiction of the Indre og Østre Finnmark District Court and the Hålogaland Court of Appeal.

=== Municipal council ===
The municipal council (Kommunestyre) of Karasjok Municipality is made up of 19 representatives that are elected to four year terms. The tables below show the current and historical composition of the council by political party.

Karasjok kommunestyre 2023–2027
Party name (in Norwegian)	Number of representatives
Labour Party (Arbeiderpartiet)	7
Conservative Party (Høyre)	1
Sámi People's Party (Samefolkets Parti)	2
Centre Party (Senterpartiet)	2
Karasjok List (Karasjok lista)	5
Karasjok Sami List (Kárášjoga sámelistu)	2
Total number of members:	19

Karasjok kommunestyre 2019–2023
Party name (in Norwegian)	Number of representatives
Labour Party (Arbeiderpartiet)	7
Conservative Party (Høyre)	1
Sámi People's Party (Samefolkets Parti)	2
Centre Party (Senterpartiet)	6
Karasjok List (Karasjok lista)	2
Johttiidsámiid List (Johttiidsámiid listu)	1
Total number of members:	19

Karasjok kommunestyre 2015–2019
Party name (in Norwegian)	Number of representatives
Labour Party (Arbeiderpartiet)	7
Conservative Party (Høyre)	1
Christian Democratic Party (Kristelig Folkeparti)	1
Sámi People's Party (Samefolkets Parti)	2
Centre Party (Senterpartiet)	6
Karasjok List (Karasjok lista)	2
Johttiidsámiid List (Johttiidsámiid listu)	1
Total number of members:	19

Karasjok kommunestyre 2011–2015
Party name (in Norwegian)	Number of representatives
Labour Party (Arbeiderpartiet)	4
Conservative Party (Høyre)	1
Sámi People's Party (Samefolkets Parti)	2
Centre Party (Senterpartiet)	5
Liberal Party (Venstre)	2
Árja (Árja)	1
Karasjok List (Karasjok lista)	3
Johttiidsámiid List (Johttiidsámiid listu)	1
Total number of members:	19

Karasjok kommunestyre 2007–2011
Party name (in Norwegian)	Number of representatives
Labour Party (Arbeiderpartiet)	7
Christian Democratic Party (Kristelig Folkeparti)	1
Sámi People's Party (Samefolkets Parti)	4
Centre Party (Senterpartiet)	3
Liberal Party (Venstre)	1
Socialist Group (Sosialisttalas joavku/Sosialistisk gruppe)	1
Karasjok Travelling Sámi List (Karasjok flyttsamelagets liste)	2
Total number of members:	19

Kárášjohka-Karasjok kommunestyre 2003–2007
Party name (in Norwegian)	Number of representatives
Labour Party (Arbeiderpartiet)	8
Christian Democratic Party (Kristelig Folkeparti)	1
Sámi People's Party (Samefolkets Parti)	4
Centre Party (Senterpartiet)	2
Liberal Party (Venstre)	1
Socialist Group (Sosialisttalas joavku/Sosialistisk gruppe)	1
Karasjok Travelling Sámi List (Karasjok flyttsamelagets liste)	2
Total number of members:	19

Kárášjohka-Karasjok kommunestyre 1999–2003
Party name (in Norwegian)	Number of representatives
Labour Party (Arbeiderpartiet)	8
Christian Democratic Party (Kristelig Folkeparti)	2
Sámi People's Party (Samefolkets Parti)	6
Centre Party (Senterpartiet)	1
Liberal Party (Venstre)	1
Socialist Group (Sosialistisk gruppe)	1
Total number of members:	19

Kárášjohka-Karasjok kommunestyre 1995–1999
Party name (in Norwegian)	Number of representatives
Labour Party (Arbeiderpartiet)	9
Conservative Party (Høyre)	1
Christian Democratic Party (Kristelig Folkeparti)	1
Centre Party (Senterpartiet)	2
Socialist Left Party (Sosialistisk Venstreparti)	2
Sámi List (Sámeálbmot lista/Samefolkets list)	4
Total number of members:	19

Kárášjohka-Karasjok kommunestyre 1991–1995
Party name (in Norwegian)	Number of representatives
Labour Party (Arbeiderpartiet)	7
Conservative Party (Høyre)	1
Christian Democratic Party (Kristelig Folkeparti)	2
Socialist Left Party (Sosialistisk Venstreparti)	3
Sámi List (Sámeálbmot lista/Samefolkets list)	3
Women's List in Karasjok (Kárásjoga nissonolbmuid lista/Kvinnelista i Karasjok)	2
People's List in Karasjok (Kárásjoga albmotlista/Folkelista i Karasjok)	1
Total number of members:	19

Karasjok kommunestyre 1987–1991
Party name (in Norwegian)	Number of representatives
Labour Party (Arbeiderpartiet)	9
Conservative Party (Høyre)	1
Christian Democratic Party (Kristelig Folkeparti)	1
Centre Party (Senterpartiet)	1
Sámi List (Sámeálbmot lista/Samefolkets list)	6
Karasjok Travelling Sámi List (Karasjok Flyttsameliste)	1
Total number of members:	19

Karasjok kommunestyre 1983–1987
Party name (in Norwegian)	Number of representatives
Labour Party (Arbeiderpartiet)	10
Conservative Party (Høyre)	2
Christian Democratic Party (Kristelig Folkeparti)	1
Local Sámi List (Dalu-ja jåhttisamiid lista)	6
Total number of members:	19

Karasjok kommunestyre 1979–1983
Party name (in Norwegian)	Number of representatives
Labour Party (Arbeiderpartiet)	8
Conservative Party (Høyre)	3
Christian Democratic Party (Kristelig Folkeparti)	1
Centre Party (Senterpartiet)	1
Local Sámi List (Dalu-ja jåhttisamiid lista)	6
Total number of members:	19

Karasjok kommunestyre 1975–1979
Party name (in Norwegian)	Number of representatives
Labour Party (Arbeiderpartiet)	9
Conservative Party (Høyre)	2
Christian Democratic Party (Kristelig Folkeparti)	1
Centre Party (Senterpartiet)	1
Local Sámi List (Dalu-ja jåhttisamiid lista)	5
Sámi List (Samefolkets liste)	1
Total number of members:	19

Karasjok kommunestyre 1971–1975
Party name (in Norwegian)	Number of representatives
Labour Party (Arbeiderpartiet)	8
Conservative Party (Høyre)	2
Centre Party (Senterpartiet)	3
Liberal Party (Venstre)	1
Local List(s) (Lokale lister)	8
Total number of members:	19

Karasjok kommunestyre 1967–1971
Party name (in Norwegian)	Number of representatives
Labour Party (Arbeiderpartiet)	8
Conservative Party (Høyre)	2
Centre Party (Senterpartiet)	2
Liberal Party (Venstre)	2
Local List(s) (Lokale lister)	1
Total number of members:	15

Karasjok kommunestyre 1963–1967
Party name (in Norwegian)	Number of representatives
Labour Party (Arbeiderpartiet)	7
Conservative Party (Høyre)	2
List of workers, fishermen, and small farmholders (Arbeidere, fiskere, småbrukere liste)	3
Local List(s) (Lokale lister)	3
Total number of members:	15

Karasjok herredsstyre 1959–1963
Party name (in Norwegian)	Number of representatives
Labour Party (Arbeiderpartiet)	7
Conservative Party (Høyre)	1
List of workers, fishermen, and small farmholders (Arbeidere, fiskere, småbrukere liste)	5
Local List(s) (Lokale lister)	2
Total number of members:	15

Karasjok herredsstyre 1955–1959
Party name (in Norwegian)	Number of representatives
Labour Party (Arbeiderpartiet)	7
List of workers, fishermen, and small farmholders (Arbeidere, fiskere, småbrukere liste)	4
Joint List(s) of Non-Socialist Parties (Borgerlige Felleslister)	3
Local List(s) (Lokale lister)	1
Total number of members:	15

Karasjok herredsstyre 1951–1955
Party name (in Norwegian)	Number of representatives
Labour Party (Arbeiderpartiet)	7
Liberal Party (Venstre)	2
Joint List(s) of Non-Socialist Parties (Borgerlige Felleslister)	1
Local List(s) (Lokale lister)	2
Total number of members:	12

Karasjok herredsstyre 1947–1951
Party name (in Norwegian)	Number of representatives
Labour Party (Arbeiderpartiet)	9
Local List(s) (Lokale lister)	3
Total number of members:	12

Karasjok herredsstyre 1945–1947
Party name (in Norwegian)	Number of representatives
Labour Party (Arbeiderpartiet)	7
List of workers, fishermen, and small farmholders (Arbeidere, fiskere, småbrukere liste)	5
Total number of members:	12

Karasjok herredsstyre 1937–1941*
Party name (in Norwegian)	Number of representatives
Labour Party (Arbeiderpartiet)	8
Local List(s) (Lokale lister)	4
Total number of members:	12
Note: Due to the German occupation of Norway during World War II, no elections were held for new municipal councils until after the war ended in 1945.

=== Mayors ===
The mayor (Norwegian: ordfører) of Karasjok Municipality is the political leader of the municipality and the chairperson of the municipal council. Here is a list of people who have held this position:

- 1867–1893: Mathis Isaksen
- 1894–1895: Carl Maxmilian Fandrem
- 1896–1903: Hans Olaus Saxlund
- 1904–1904: Anders J. Lindi
- 1905–1907: Josef Isaksen
- 1908–1910: Kristian Nissen
- 1911–1916: Bendiks Løining
- 1917–1919: Oluf Hagen
- 1920–1922: Oluf Ludvig Jenssen
- 1923–1925: Arne Havig Faye
- 1926–1928: Oluf Hagen
- 1929–1931: Einar Isaksen
- 1932–1934: Alf Wiig
- 1935–1940: Samuel Norvang
- 1941–1943: Einar Isaksen
- 1944–1947: Samuel Norvang
- 1948–1955: Jon Fagerli
- 1956–1962: Lydolf Lind Meløy
- 1962–1965: Amund Nedrejord
- 1966–1971: Hans Rønbeck
- 1972–1975: Hans Guttorm
- 1976–1979: Norvald Soleng
- 1980–1981: Hans Guttorm
- 1982–1983: Svein Ole Persen
- 1984–1987: Norvald Soleng
- 1988–2011: Kjell H. Sæther
- 2011–2015: Anne Toril Eriksen Balto
- 2015–present: Svein Atle Somby (Ap)

== Geography ==
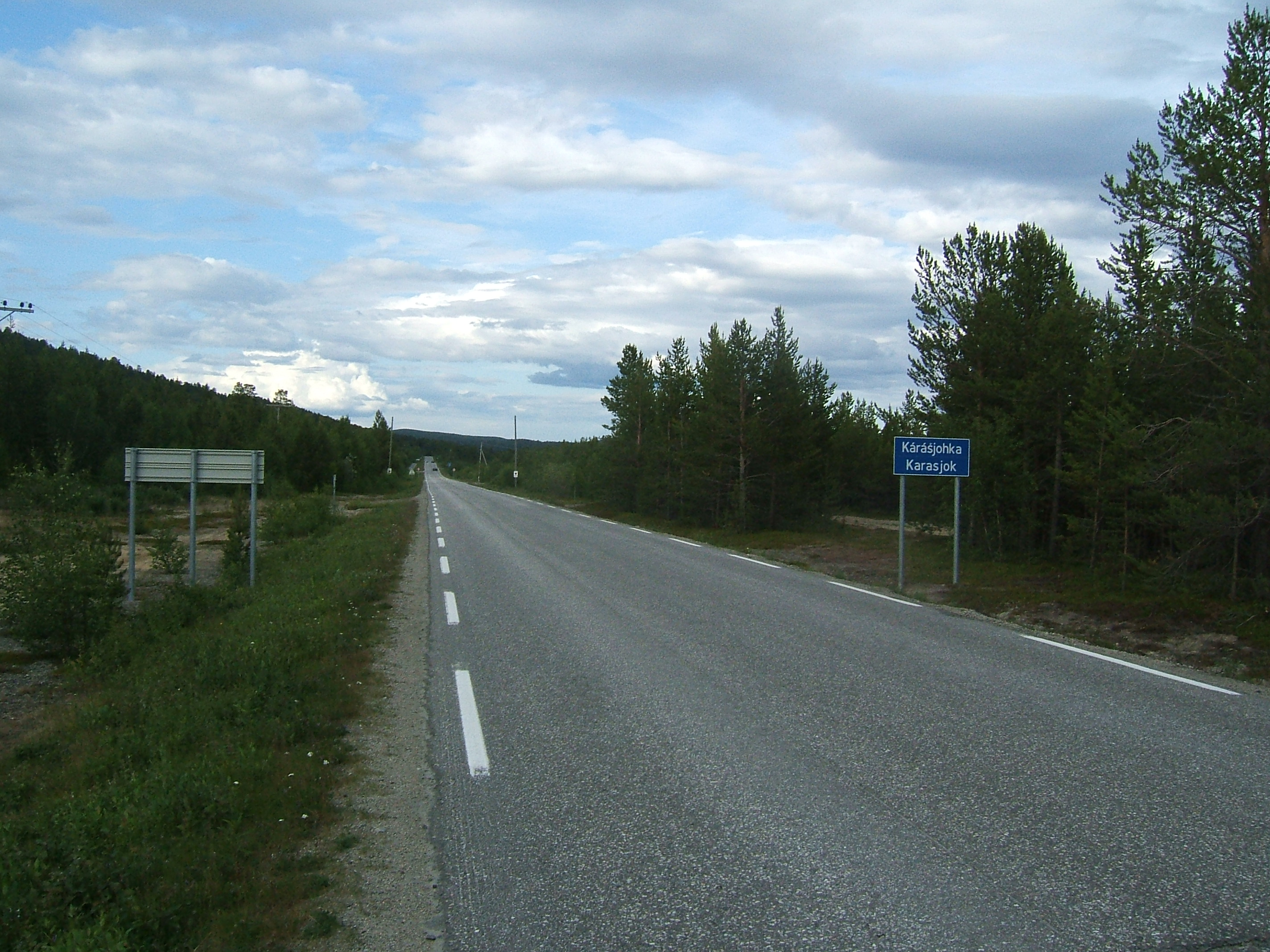
Entering Karasjok

The municipality is situated along the upper river basin of the Deatnu / Tana river and its tributaries: Anárjohka and Kárášjohka. It includes large tracts of the high Finnmarksvidda plateau. Lakes in the region include Čorotjávri, Gásadatjávri, Iešjávri, and Idjajávri. The river valley, unlike the plateau, is covered with pine and birch forests. The southern part of the municipality is part of the Anárjohka National Park. The highest point in the municipality is the 1,024-metre (3,360 ft) tall mountain Vuorji.

=== Climate ===
Karasjok has a typical subarctic climate (Köppen Dfc, Trewartha Eclc) with cold, long and dry winters, and cool to mild summers. In this far northeastern part of Norway, the climate is much more continental and dry compared to the typical coastal climate in Norway.

Situated in a river valley on this plateau, Karasjok has recorded the coldest official temperature ever in Norway: −51.4 °C (−60.5 °F) on 1 January 1886. The warmest temperature ever recorded is 32.4 °C (90.3 °F) recorded July 1914 at an earlier weather station. The warmest month on record was July 2014 with mean 18.4 °C (65.1 °F) and average daily high 24.8 °C (76.6 °F). The coldest month on record was February 1966 with a mean of −27.1 °C (−16.8 °F). The coldest month in more recent decades is February 2007 with mean −20.9 °C (−5.6 °F) and average daily low −26.9 °C (−16.4 °F).

Climate data for Karasjok (2002–2020 averages; extremes since 1951)
Month	Jan	Feb	Mar	Apr	May	Jun	Jul	Aug	Sep	Oct	Nov	Dec	Year
Record high °C (°F)	7.2 (45.0)	7.2 (45.0)	8.9 (48.0)	15.1 (59.2)	30.5 (86.9)	31.0 (87.8)	31.7 (89.1)	31.0 (87.8)	23.0 (73.4)	14.8 (58.6)	11.3 (52.3)	7.8 (46.0)	31.7 (89.1)
Mean maximum °C (°F)	2.2 (36.0)	2.9 (37.2)	4.7 (40.5)	10.2 (50.4)	20.4 (68.7)	24.8 (76.6)	26.5 (79.7)	24.9 (76.8)	18.5 (65.3)	10.7 (51.3)	4.0 (39.2)	3.3 (37.9)	27.9 (82.2)
Mean daily maximum °C (°F)	−9.8 (14.4)	−8.4 (16.9)	−2.2 (28.0)	3.6 (38.5)	9.8 (49.6)	15.1 (59.2)	19.3 (66.7)	16.6 (61.9)	11.2 (52.2)	2.7 (36.9)	−3.7 (25.3)	−6.4 (20.5)	4.0 (39.2)
Daily mean °C (°F)	−15.4 (4.3)	−13.9 (7.0)	−8.3 (17.1)	−1.1 (30.0)	5.2 (41.4)	10.4 (50.7)	14.2 (57.6)	11.7 (53.1)	6.8 (44.2)	−0.6 (30.9)	−7.9 (17.8)	−11.8 (10.8)	−0.9 (30.4)
Mean daily minimum °C (°F)	−20.9 (−5.6)	−19.4 (−2.9)	−14.3 (6.3)	−5.8 (21.6)	0.5 (32.9)	5.6 (42.1)	9.0 (48.2)	6.7 (44.1)	2.3 (36.1)	−3.9 (25.0)	−12.0 (10.4)	−17.1 (1.2)	−5.8 (21.6)
Mean minimum °C (°F)	−37.4 (−35.3)	−35.8 (−32.4)	−30.1 (−22.2)	−20.2 (−4.4)	−6.9 (19.6)	−0.2 (31.6)	2.4 (36.3)	−0.9 (30.4)	−5.2 (22.6)	−17.0 (1.4)	−27.1 (−16.8)	−32.9 (−27.2)	−39.4 (−38.9)
Record low °C (°F)	−51.2 (−60.2)	−50.0 (−58.0)	−43.2 (−45.8)	−32.8 (−27.0)	−23.0 (−9.4)	−3.8 (25.2)	−1.8 (28.8)	−5.4 (22.3)	−14.2 (6.4)	−29.2 (−20.6)	−40.9 (−41.6)	−46.4 (−51.5)	−51.2 (−60.2)
Average precipitation mm (inches)	26.1 (1.03)	22.3 (0.88)	19.7 (0.78)	19.7 (0.78)	34.4 (1.35)	51.1 (2.01)	72.8 (2.87)	54.7 (2.15)	38.4 (1.51)	31.4 (1.24)	26.9 (1.06)	32.3 (1.27)	429.8 (16.93)
Average extreme snow depth cm (inches)	45 (18)	53 (21)	56 (22)	53 (21)	13 (5.1)	0 (0)	0 (0)	0 (0)	trace	8 (3.1)	22 (8.7)	35 (14)	58 (23)
Source: Norsk Klimaservicesenter

Climate data for Čoavddatmohkki 1991-2020 (286 m)
Month	Jan	Feb	Mar	Apr	May	Jun	Jul	Aug	Sep	Oct	Nov	Dec	Year
Mean daily maximum °C (°F)	−8 (18)	−8.3 (17.1)	−3.9 (25.0)	1.3 (34.3)	7.2 (45.0)	13.9 (57.0)	17.8 (64.0)	15.3 (59.5)	9.9 (49.8)	2 (36)	−3.9 (25.0)	−6.1 (21.0)	3.1 (37.6)
Daily mean °C (°F)	−13.6 (7.5)	−13.4 (7.9)	−9.3 (15.3)	−3.1 (26.4)	3.4 (38.1)	9.3 (48.7)	13.1 (55.6)	11 (52)	5.8 (42.4)	−1.3 (29.7)	−8 (18)	−11.3 (11.7)	−1.4 (29.4)
Mean daily minimum °C (°F)	−19.5 (−3.1)	−19.9 (−3.8)	−15.6 (3.9)	−8.9 (16.0)	−1.1 (30.0)	4.6 (40.3)	7.8 (46.0)	5.6 (42.1)	1.6 (34.9)	−4.7 (23.5)	−13.1 (8.4)	−17.3 (0.9)	−6.7 (19.9)
Average precipitation mm (inches)	19.7 (0.78)	20 (0.8)	18.2 (0.72)	20 (0.8)	30.5 (1.20)	53.6 (2.11)	71.6 (2.82)	65.4 (2.57)	40.4 (1.59)	37.4 (1.47)	26.1 (1.03)	24.6 (0.97)	427.5 (16.86)
Average precipitation days (≥ 1.0 mm)	7	7	6	5	6	9	12	10	8	8	7	8	93
Source: NOAA

=== Wildlife ===
The birdlife to be found in this municipality is characteristic for the region. The inland habitats of Finnmarksvidda are known for their rich bird life with species like Bluethroat preferring areas with scrub. The Tana river also flows through Karasjok and many of the species found in higher areas use it as a migration route.

In late 2022, there were estimated to be 16 bears are in the municipality.

== Economy ==
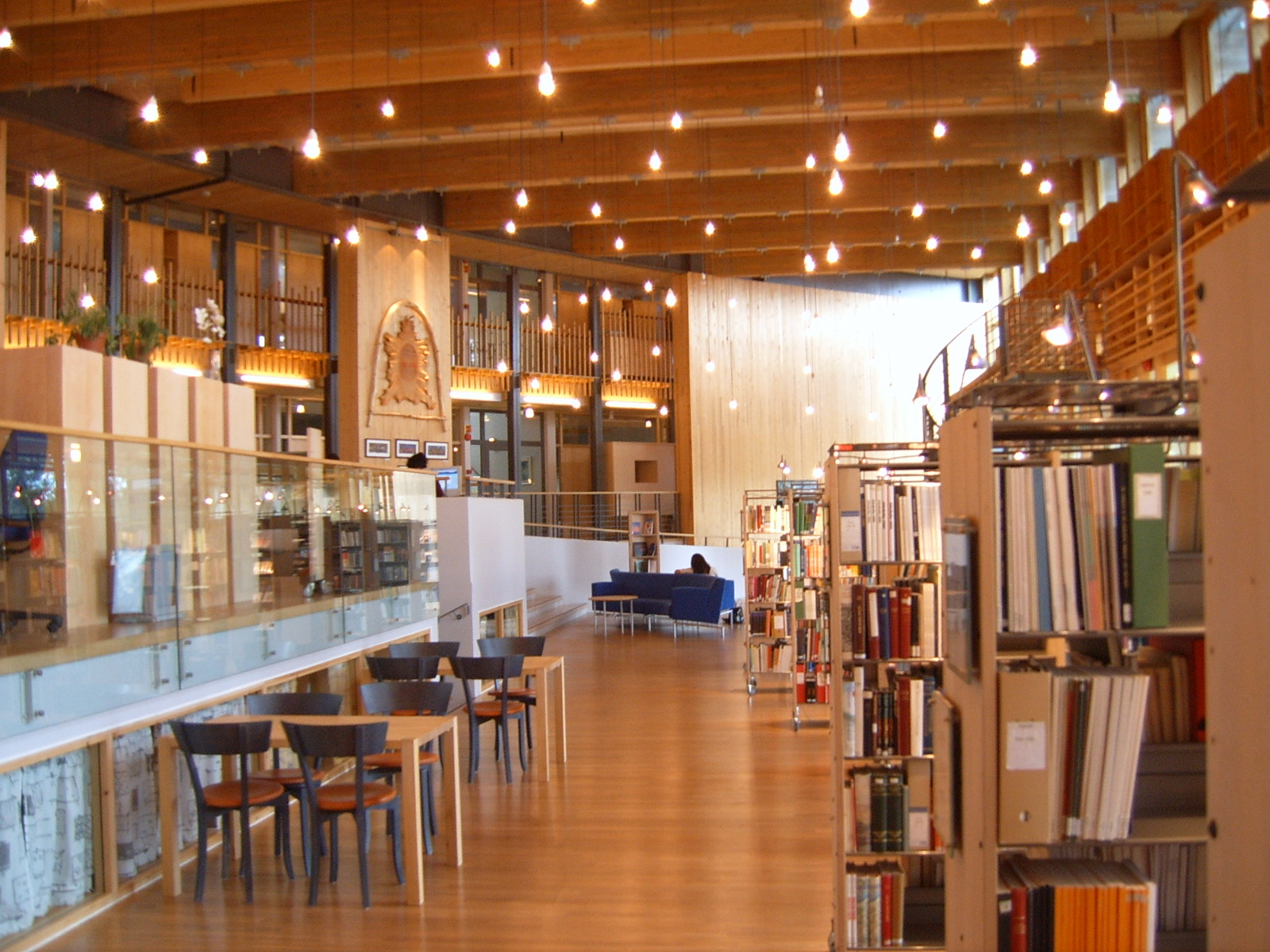
Inside the Samediggi (the Sami parliament)

Most people live in the village of Karasjok (Kárášjohka). The village is the seat of the Sámediggi, the Sami Parliament of Norway, as well as of the Sami broadcasting, and several Sami institutions (public and private) are found here, including Davvi Girji, the largest Sámi publisher. About 80% of the population is Sami speaking, and Sami and Norwegian have equal status in the municipality.

=== Tourism ===
The attractions include the Sami parliament, Samediggi, the Sami museum, and the Old Karasjok Church, dating from 1807. The Sami parliament was opened in 1989, by King Olav V, the first Sami parliament president was Ole Henrik Magga, from the neighboring Kautokeino Municipality. He was the president for more than eight years. The Old Karasjok Church is the oldest Lutheran church in Finnmark county. The church is today too small, so a new, larger, wooden Karasjok Church, inspired by Sami architecture, has been built. Karasjok is also the place to look for duodji, Sami handicraft.

== Notable people ==
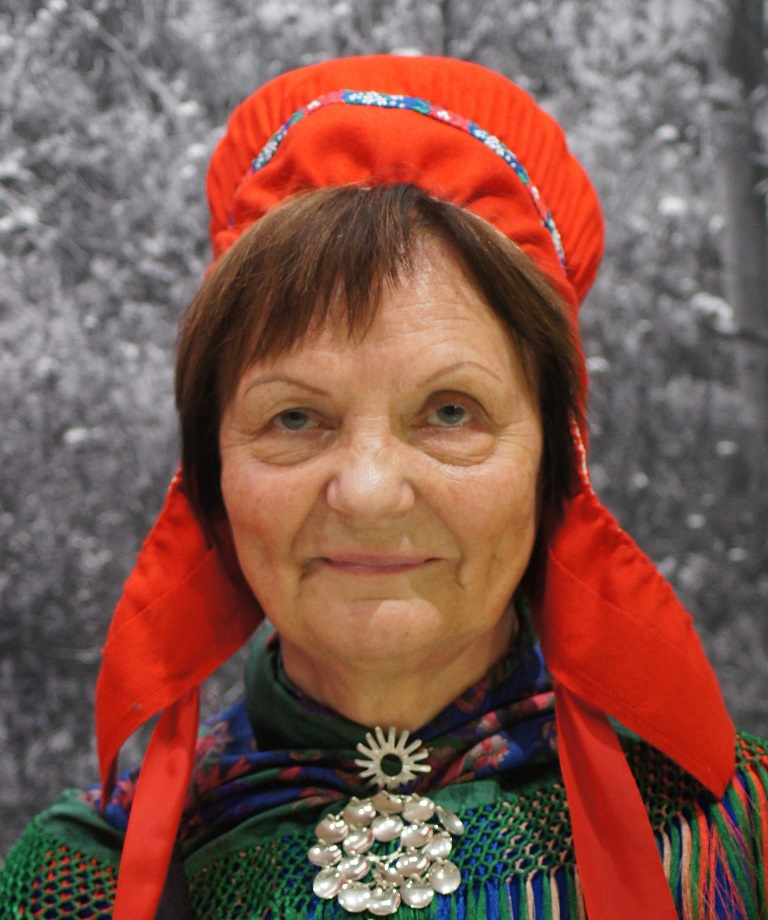
Inga Ravna Eira, 2018

- Samuel Balto (1861 in Karasjok – 1921), a Norwegian–Sami explorer and adventurer (in Alaska, Greenland, and Canada), and member of the Fridtjof Nansen's Greenland expedition
- Ole Ravna (1841 in Karasjok – 1906), a Norwegian-Sami explorer, adventurer, and member of the Fridtjof Nansen's Greenland expedition
- Matti Aikio (1872 in Karasjok – 1929), a Norwegian Sami writer
- Iver Jåks (1932 in Karasjok – 2007), a Norwegian Sami artist who used Sami culture and mythology in his artistic works
- Inga Ravna Eira (1948 in Karasjok), a Northern Sami language poet, children's writer, translator, and schoolteacher
- Mari Boine (born 1956 in Gámehisnjárga), a singer
- Tor Mikkel Wara (born 1964 in Karasjok), a former politician
- Ragnhild Vassvik Kalstad (born 1966), a politician and former member of Karasjok municipal council
- Anita Nergaard (born 1967), a Norwegian Sami diplomat
- Susanne Guttorm, (Norwegian Wiki) (born 1996 in Karasjok), a model and Miss Norway 2018
- Gunvor Guttorm (born 1958 in Karasjok) a Sami artist, art historian and academic

=== Sport ===
- Jan Egil Brekke (born 1974), a footballer who grew up in Karasjok
- Leif Arne Brekke (born 1977), a footballer who grew up in Karasjok
- Hans Norbye (born 1987 in Karasjok), a footballer
