= Old Karasjok Church =

- Karasjok gamle kirke
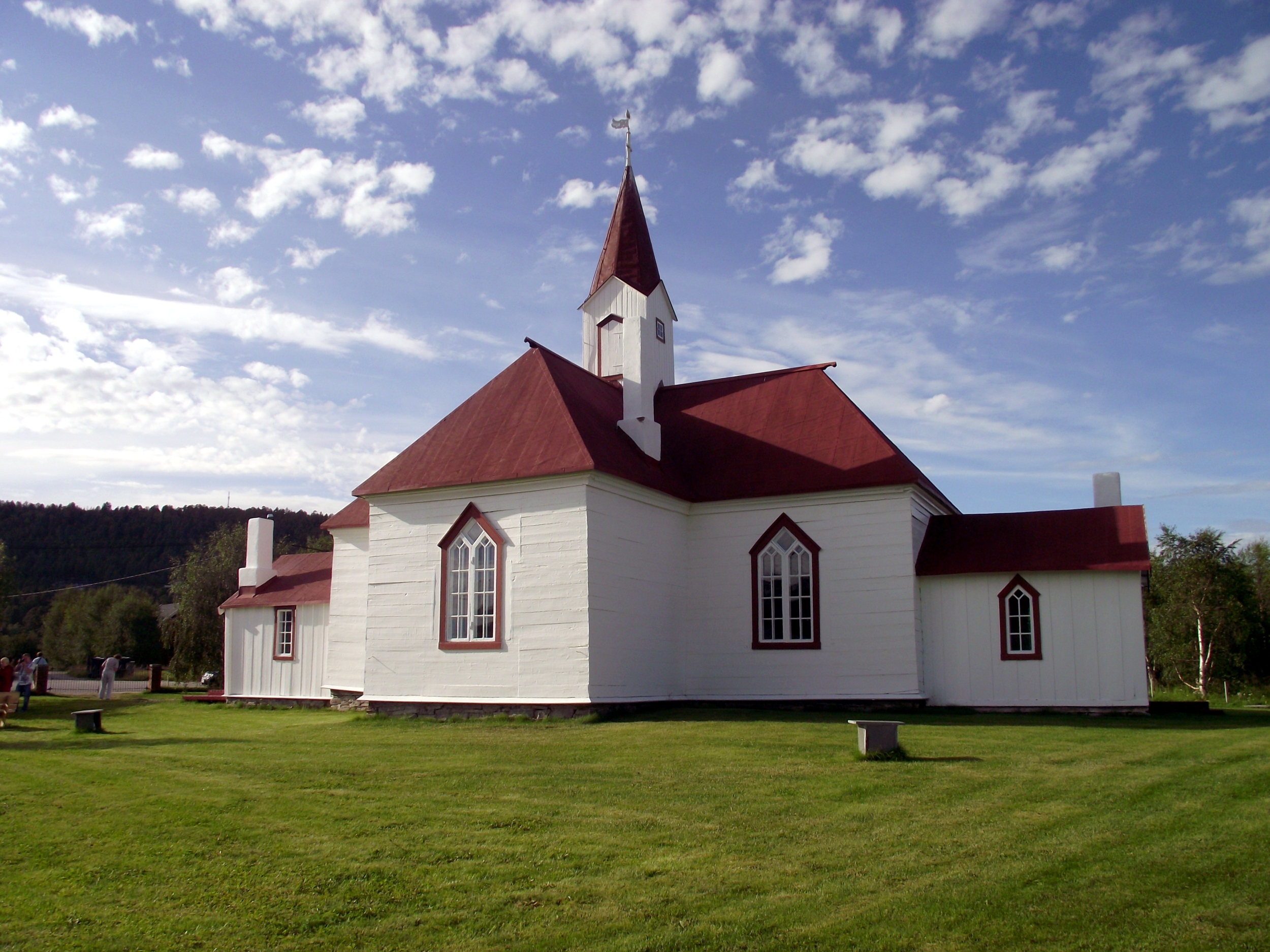
- View of the church
- Old Karasjok Church
- 69.466662°N 25.5037347°E
- Location: Karasjok Municipality, Finnmark
- Country: Norway
- Denomination: Church of Norway
- Churchmanship: Evangelical Lutheran

History
- Status: Parish church

Architecture
- Functional status: Active
- Architect: Daniel Storch
- Architectural type: Cruciform
- Completed: 1807 (219 years ago)

Specifications
- Capacity: 140
- Materials: Wood

Administration
- Diocese: Nord-Hålogaland
- Deanery: Indre Finnmark prosti
- Parish: Karasjok
- Norwegian Cultural Heritage Site
- Type: Church
- Status: Automatically protected
- ID: 84761

Old Karasjok Church (Norwegian: Karasjok gamle kirke) is a former parish church of the Church of Norway in Karasjok Municipality in Finnmark county, Norway. It is located in the village of Karasjok, which is on the Karasjohka river, 12 kilometres (7.5 mi) west of the Norway-Finland border. It used to be the main church for the Karasjok parish which is part of the Indre Finnmark prosti (deanery) in the Diocese of Nord-Hålogaland. The Old Karasjok Church is the oldest Lutheran church in Finnmark county, and the only building in the municipality to survive World War II undamaged. The church is no longer regularly used, but it is utilized occasionally for special situations such as weddings.

== History ==
The white, wooden church was built in a cruciform style in 1807 on the basis of designs by the architect Daniel Storch. It served as the main parish church for Karasjok from 1807 until 1974 when the new Karasjok Church was completed. In 1858, the sacristy was enlarged by adding on to the building. Until 1902, the church had a domed turret, but in 1902 a steeple was built to replace the dome.

== Media gallery ==
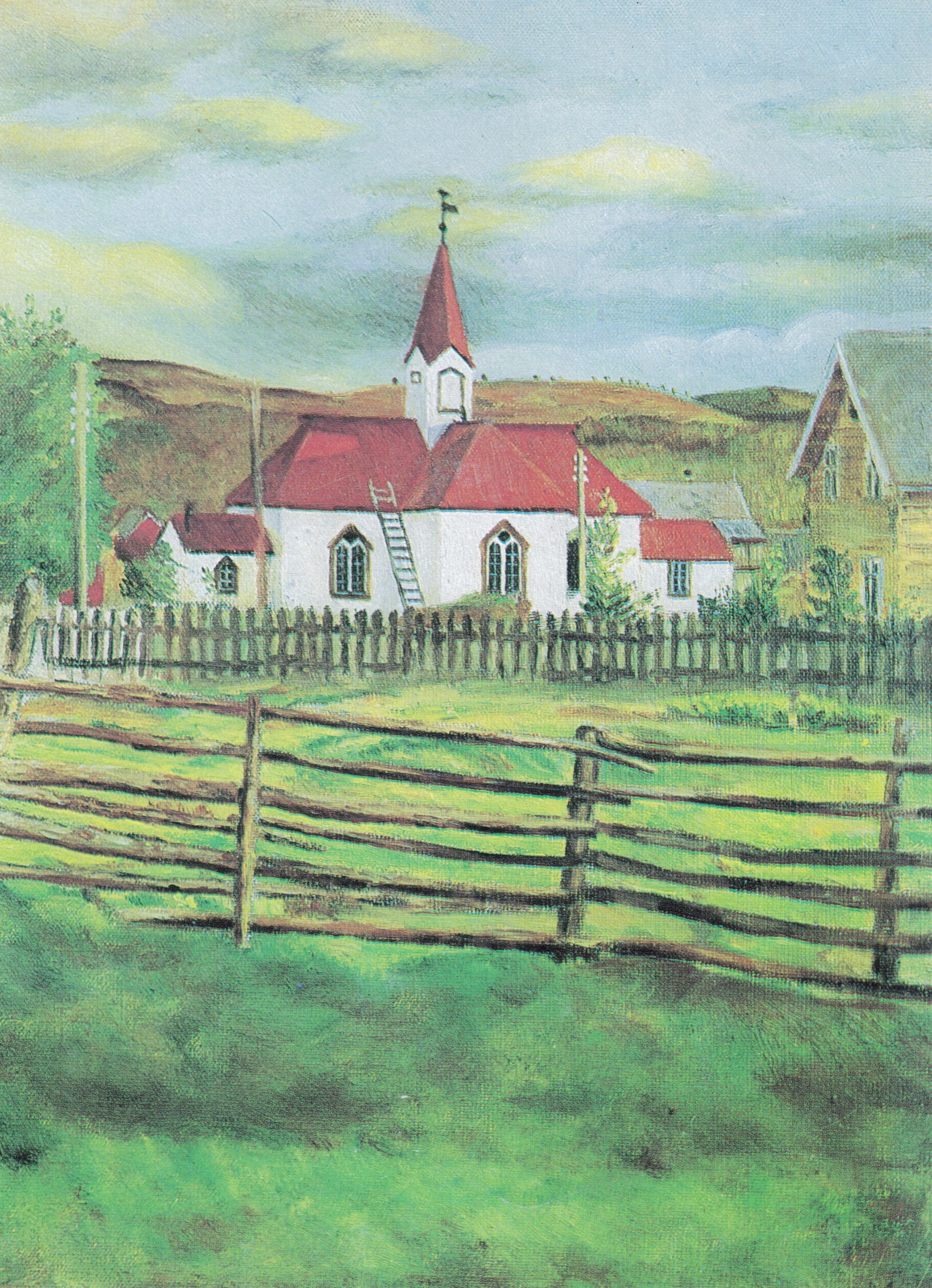
Karasjok kirke by John Savio (1927)

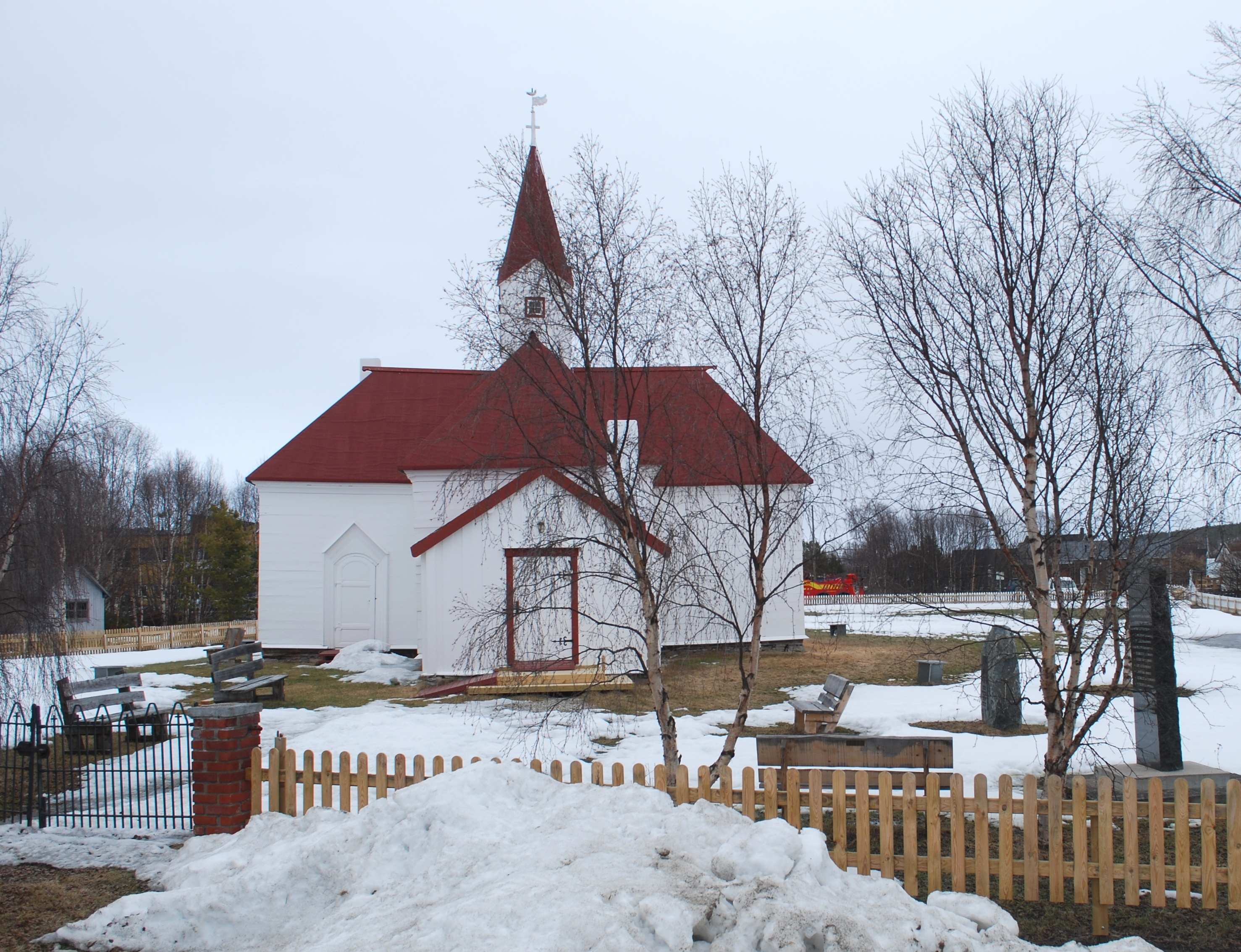

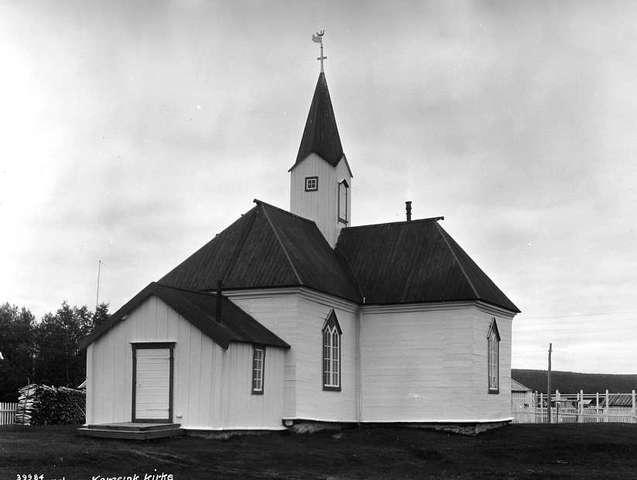

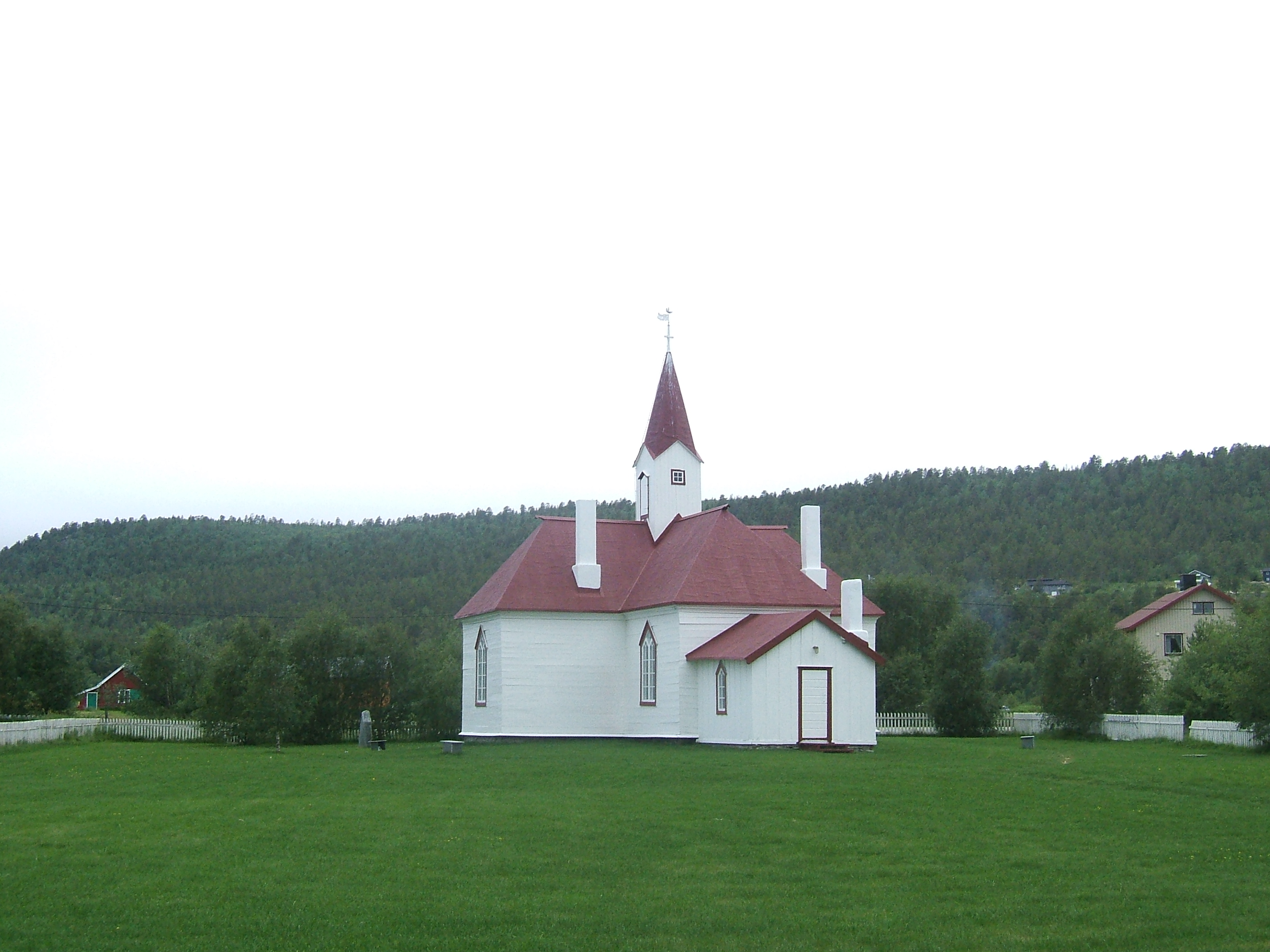

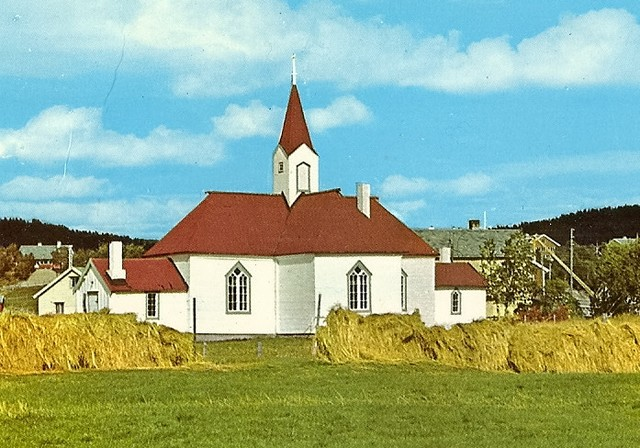

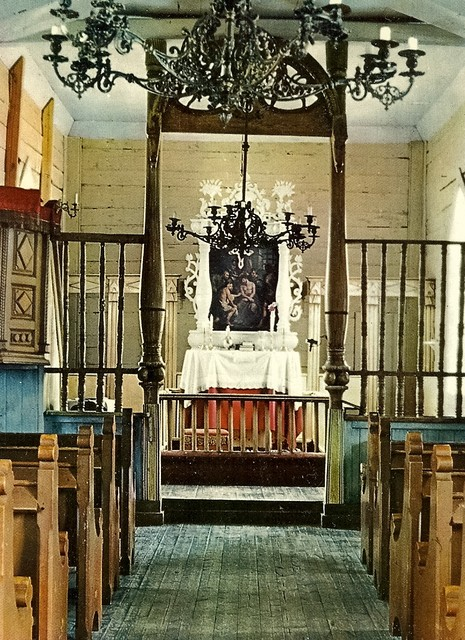

== See also ==
- List of churches in Nord-Hålogaland
