= Šuoššjávri =

Village in Karasjok, Norway

Šuoššjávri (Northern Sami) Suossjavri (Norwegian)
- Village
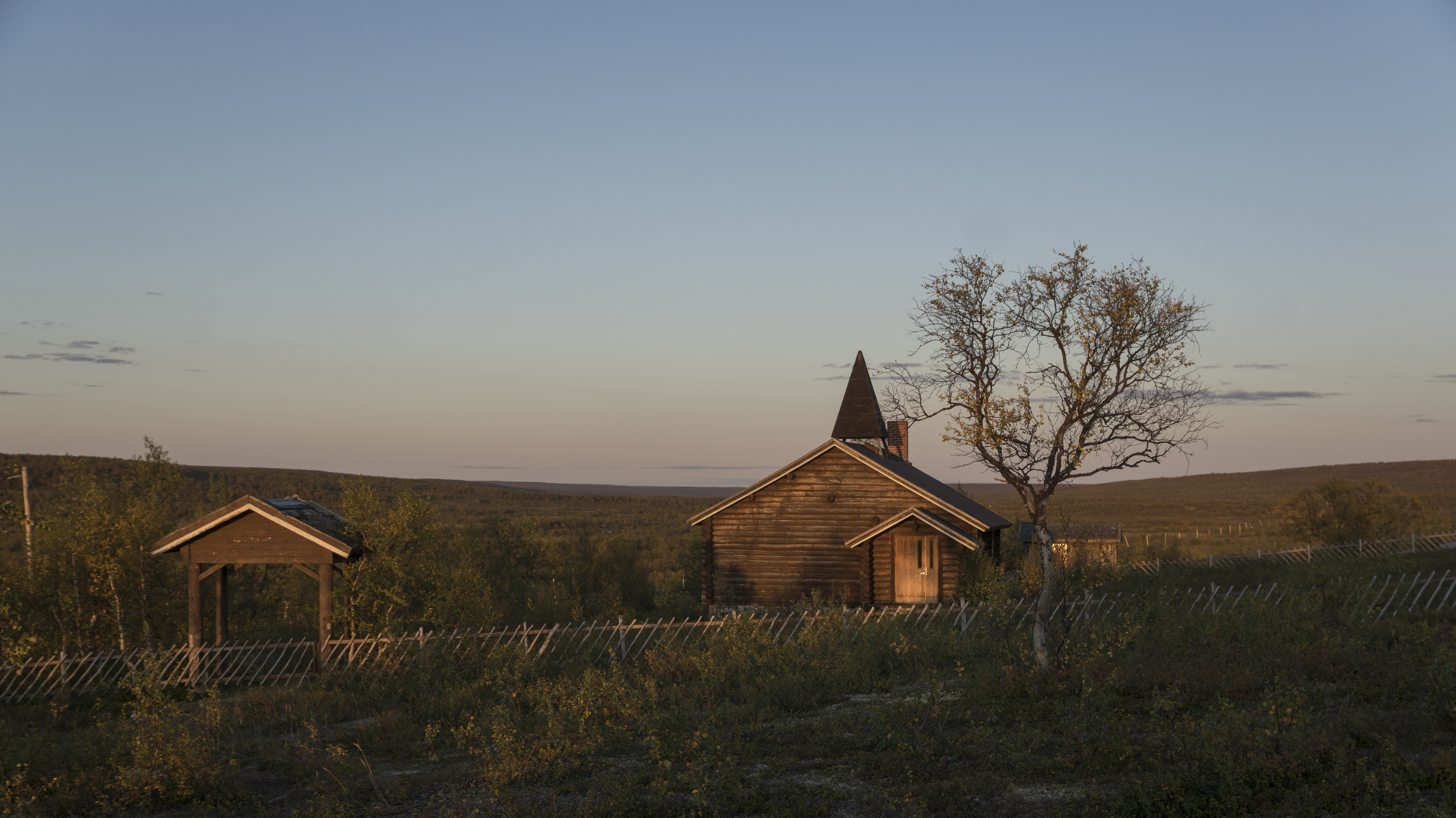
- Interactive map of Šuoššjávri (Northern Sami)
- Location within Finnmark Location within Norway
- Coordinates: 69°22′32″N 24°15′18″E
- Country: Norway
- Region: Northern Norway
- County: Finnmark
- District: Vest-Finnmark
- Municipality: Karasjok
- Elevation: 329 m (1,079 ft)
- Time zone: UTC+01:00 (CET)
  - Summer (DST): UTC+02:00 (CEST)
- Post Code: 9730 Karasjok

Šuoššjávri (Northern Sami) or Suossjavri (Norwegian) is a village in Karasjok Municipality in Finnmark county, Norway. The village is located in the western part of the municipality, just inside the border with Kautokeino. The small village is home to Suosjavrre Chapel. The village is located along the Norwegian National Road 92 which connects the villages of Kautokeino and Karasjok.

== Climate ==
There is a weather station for Čoavddatmohkki, a hamlet near Šuoššjávri in the municipality of Karasjok. Čoavddatmohkki has a subarctic climate (Köppen Dfc) with long, dry winters and short, warm summers.

Climate data for Čoavddatmohkki (1991−2020 normals, extremes 1966−present): 286 m (938 ft)
Month	Jan	Feb	Mar	Apr	May	Jun	Jul	Aug	Sep	Oct	Nov	Dec	Year
Record high °C (°F)	6.2 (43.2)	6.2 (43.2)	6.9 (44.4)	12.7 (54.9)	28.4 (83.1)	29.8 (85.6)	31.4 (88.5)	29.4 (84.9)	22.4 (72.3)	14.3 (57.7)	10.5 (50.9)	7.3 (45.1)	31.4 (88.5)
Mean maximum °C (°F)	2.4 (36.3)	1.9 (35.4)	3.5 (38.3)	7.5 (45.5)	16.3 (61.3)	22.8 (73.0)	24.7 (76.5)	22.7 (72.9)	16.9 (62.4)	9.4 (48.9)	3.1 (37.6)	3.2 (37.8)	26.0 (78.8)
Mean daily maximum °C (°F)	−8.0 (17.6)	−8.3 (17.1)	−3.9 (25.0)	1.3 (34.3)	7.2 (45.0)	13.9 (57.0)	17.8 (64.0)	15.2 (59.4)	9.9 (49.8)	2.0 (35.6)	−3.9 (25.0)	−6.1 (21.0)	3.1 (37.6)
Daily mean °C (°F)	−13.3 (8.1)	−13.4 (7.9)	−9.3 (15.3)	−3.0 (26.6)	3.4 (38.1)	9.3 (48.7)	13.1 (55.6)	11.0 (51.8)	5.8 (42.4)	−1.1 (30.0)	−8.0 (17.6)	−11.3 (11.7)	−1.4 (29.5)
Mean daily minimum °C (°F)	−19.5 (−3.1)	−20.0 (−4.0)	−15.6 (3.9)	−8.9 (16.0)	−1.1 (30.0)	4.6 (40.3)	7.8 (46.0)	5.6 (42.1)	1.6 (34.9)	−4.7 (23.5)	−13.1 (8.4)	−17.3 (0.9)	−6.7 (19.9)
Mean minimum °C (°F)	−36.7 (−34.1)	−36.5 (−33.7)	−31.5 (−24.7)	−25.3 (−13.5)	−10.4 (13.3)	−1.1 (30.0)	1.0 (33.8)	−2.4 (27.7)	−6.7 (19.9)	−18.4 (−1.1)	−28.0 (−18.4)	−33.2 (−27.8)	−39.9 (−39.8)
Record low °C (°F)	−49.8 (−57.6)	−44.2 (−47.6)	−41.4 (−42.5)	−36.4 (−33.5)	−25.0 (−13.0)	−4.6 (23.7)	−2.3 (27.9)	−7.6 (18.3)	−14.3 (6.3)	−30.3 (−22.5)	−37.5 (−35.5)	−43.3 (−45.9)	−49.8 (−57.6)
Average precipitation mm (inches)	19.7 (0.78)	20.5 (0.81)	17.8 (0.70)	20.0 (0.79)	30.5 (1.20)	53.6 (2.11)	71.6 (2.82)	65.4 (2.57)	40.4 (1.59)	37.4 (1.47)	26.1 (1.03)	24.6 (0.97)	427.6 (16.84)
Source: Norwegian Meteorological Institute
