= Karasjok Church =

- Karasjok kirke
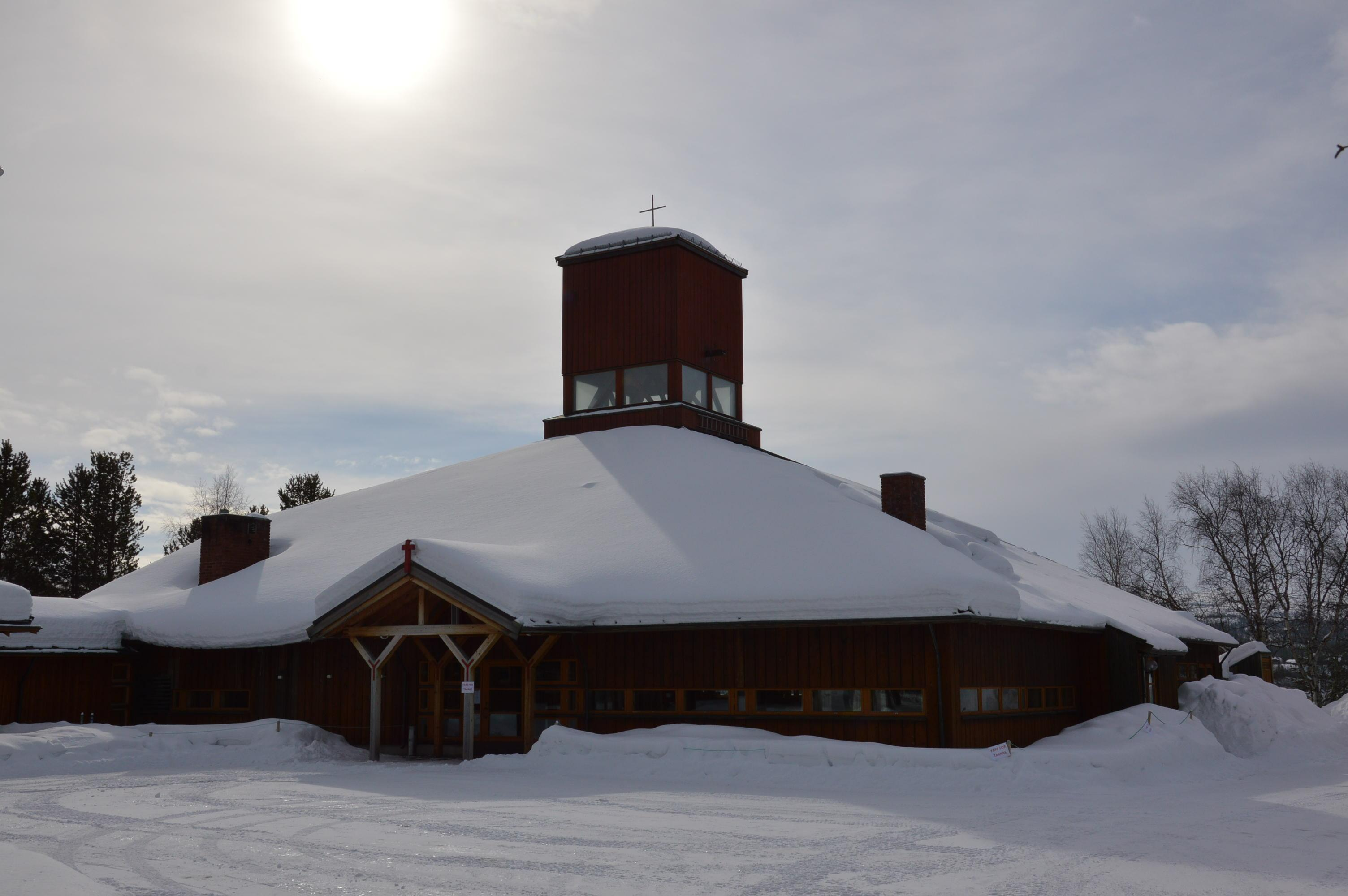
- View of the church
- Karasjok Church
- 69.469797°N 25.508739°E
- Location: Karasjok Municipality, Finnmark
- Country: Norway
- Denomination: Church of Norway
- Churchmanship: Evangelical Lutheran

History
- Status: Parish church
- Founded: 1974
- Consecrated: 1974

Architecture
- Functional status: Active
- Architect: Odd Østbye
- Architectural type: Long church
- Completed: 1974 (52 years ago)

Specifications
- Capacity: 500
- Materials: Wood

Administration
- Diocese: Nord-Hålogaland
- Deanery: Indre Finnmark prosti
- Parish: Karasjok
- Norwegian Cultural Heritage Site
- Type: Church
- Status: Listed
- ID: 84761

Karasjok Church (Norwegian: Karasjok kirke) is a parish church of the Church of Norway in Karasjok Municipality in Finnmark county, Norway. It is located in the village of Karasjok, which is on the Karasjohka river. It is the main church for the Karasjok parish which is part of the Indre Finnmark prosti (deanery) in the Diocese of Nord-Hålogaland.

The brown, wooden church was built in 1974 to replace the Old Karasjok Church which was built in 1807. The new church was designed by the architect Odd Østbye and it seats about 500 people. The ground plan is roughly rectangular and all the rooms on the ground level are consolidated under one roof. A low "pitched tent" roof unites with a large ridge turret that has a skylight. The building is clad with vertical panelling. The parish's assembly room, sitting room, offices, and sacristy are located towards the southeast/southwest. Towards the northeast/northwest lies the actual sanctuary room.

== Media gallery ==
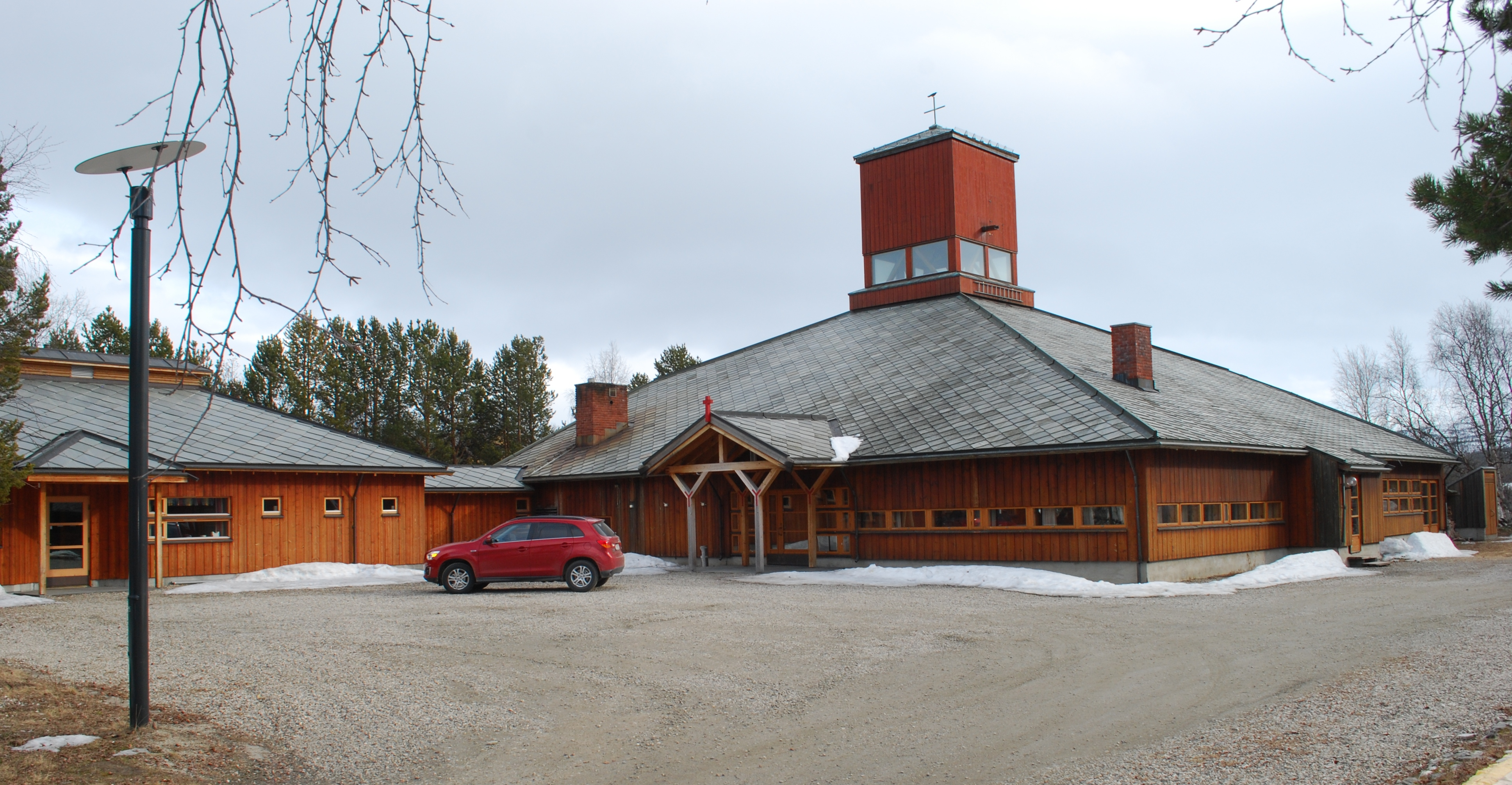
Exterior

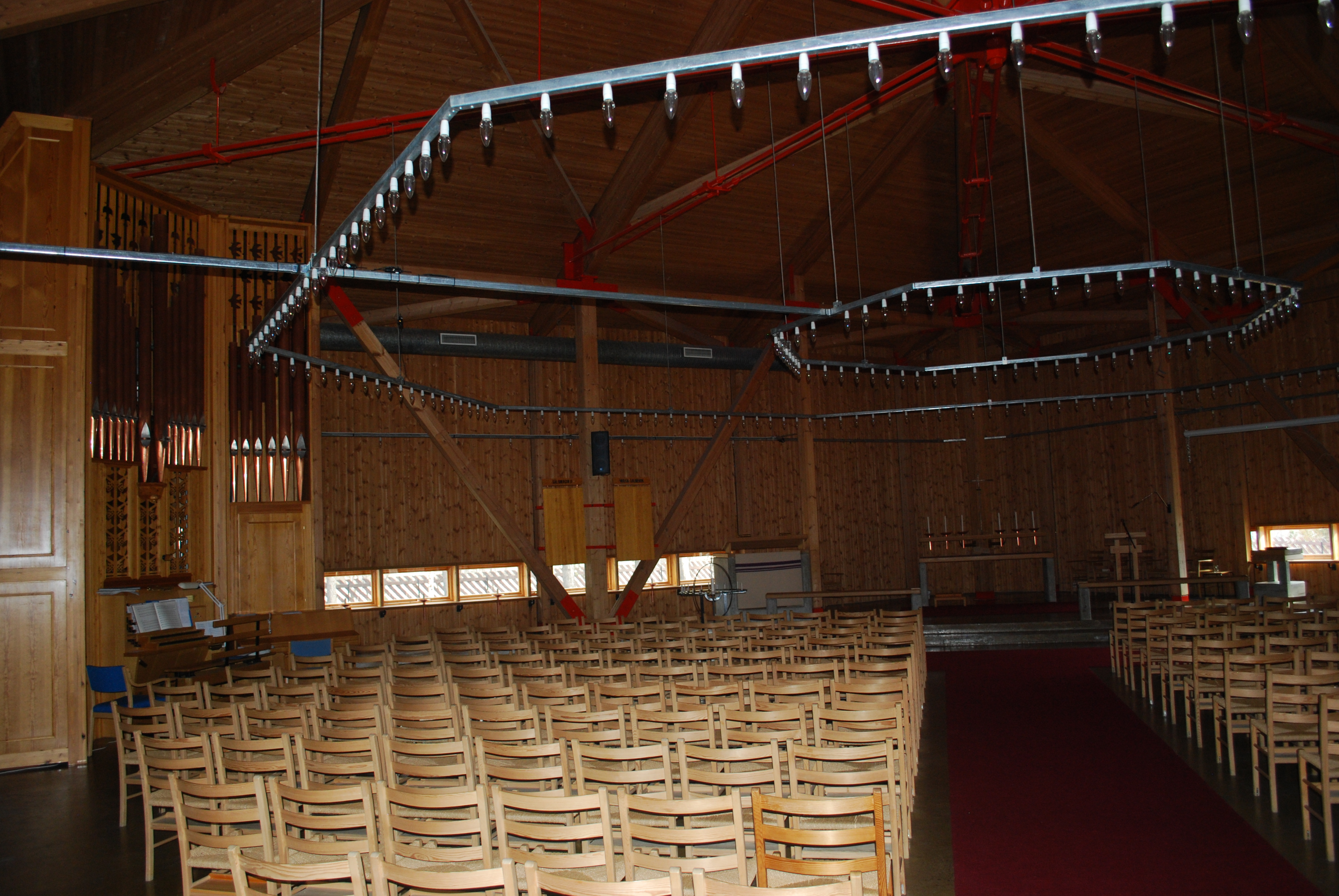
Interior

== See also ==
- List of churches in Nord-Hålogaland
