= Anárjohka National Park =

National park in Norway

- Anárjohka nasjonalpark (Norwegian); Anárjoga álbmotmeacci (Northern Sami)
- IUCN category II (national park)
- Interactive map of Anárjohka National Park
- Location: Karasjok and Kautokeino, Finnmark county, Norway
- Nearest city: Karasjok
- Coordinates: 68°44′N 24°45′E
- Area: 1,409 km^{2} (544 sq mi)
- Established: 1976
- Governing body: Norwegian Environment Agency

Anárjohka National Park (Norwegian: Anárjohka nasjonalpark, Northern Sami: Anárjoga álbmotmeahcci) is a national park that lies in Karasjok Municipality and Kautokeino Municipality in Finnmark county, Norway. The park was opened in 1976 and is 1,409 square kilometres (544 sq mi) in area. It borders on Lemmenjoki National Park in Finland. A process to expand the national park by an additional 624.6 km^{2} (241 sq mi) was started in 2009, however it was cancelled in 2015 after local opposition. Anárjohka national park is located on the interior of the Finnmarksvidda plateau and it includes extensive birch woods, pine barrens, bogs, and lakes.

== Fauna ==
There is a rich animal life inside the park. The largest mammals are the moose, but they often migrate to more wooded areas outside the park for the winter. The park has 12 winter grazing units for reindeer. Consequently, from November to April inclusive, the reindeer completely dominate the park. Brown bear have their winter lairs within the national park and wolverines only visit sporadically. The red fox and stoat are the most common of the smaller predators.

Many small rodents are found in the park. Lemmings, field voles, root voles and northern water voles are most widespread, but their numbers vary a great deal from year to year. The northern red-backed vole, a typical Siberian species, is a characteristic inhabitant of the national park. The area has a stable hare population, and a few species of shrews are also present.

Anarjohka national park has many kinds of fish. Salmon, trout, three-spined sticklebacks, grayling, vendace, pike, perch, burbot, and minnows are common. One of the rarer fish species is char, which is found in only one of the lakes.

== Name ==
The park is named after the large river Anárjohka which begins in the park and flows north. The river name comes from the Northern Sami language where johka means "river". The meaning of the first element is unknown (but it is also found in the name of the Finnish Lake Inari which translates to the Sami Anárjávri).

The national park was formerly named "Øvre Anárjohka National Park", but the name was changed in 2021. The word øvre is from the Norwegian language and means "upper", thus the former name means "the upper part of the Anárjohka river".
