= Šuoššjávri Chapel =

- Šuoššjávrri kapealla (Northern Sami); Suosjavrre kapell (Norwegian)
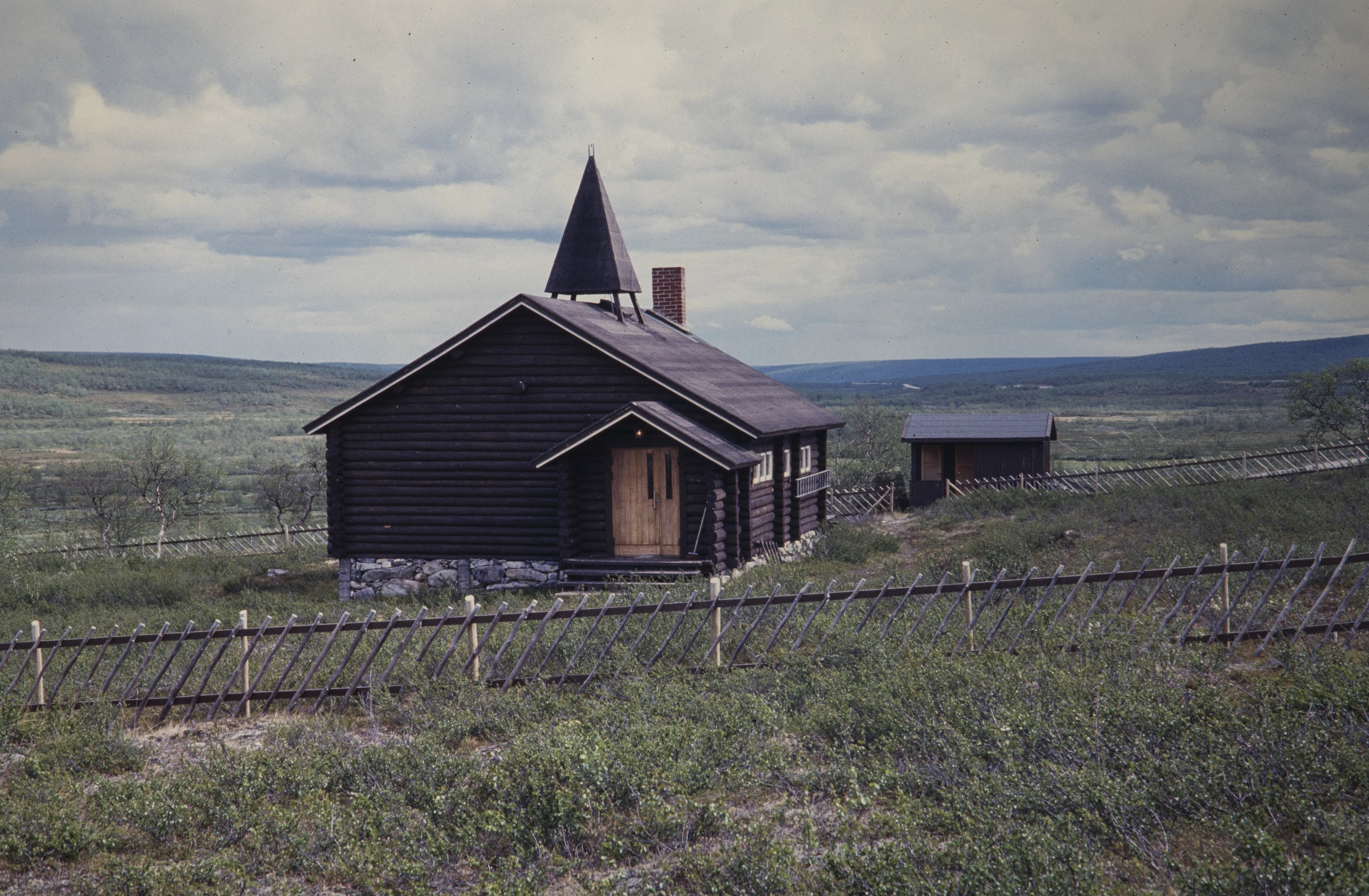
- View of the chapel
- Šuoššjávri Chapel
- 69.374991°N 24.258759°E
- Location: Karasjok Municipality, Finnmark
- Country: Norway
- Denomination: Church of Norway
- Churchmanship: Evangelical Lutheran

History
- Status: Chapel
- Founded: 1968
- Consecrated: 1968

Architecture
- Functional status: Active
- Architect: Ernst Nilsen
- Architectural type: Long church
- Completed: 1968 (58 years ago)

Specifications
- Capacity: 75
- Materials: Wood

Administration
- Diocese: Nord-Hålogaland bispedømme
- Deanery: Indre Finnmark prosti
- Parish: Karasjok
- Norwegian Cultural Heritage Site
- Type: Church
- Status: Not protected
- ID: 85004

Šuoššjávri Chapel (Northern Sami: Šuoššjávrri kapealla, Norwegian: Suosjavrre kapell) is a chapel of the Church of Norway in Karasjok Municipality in Finnmark county, Norway. It is located in the village of Šuoššjávri. It is an annex chapel for the Karasjok parish which is part of the Indre Finnmark prosti (deanery) in the Diocese of Nord-Hålogaland. The wooden church was built in a rectangular style in 1968 by the architect Ernst Nilsen. The church seats about 75 people and serves the rural western part of the municipality.

== See also ==
- List of churches in Nord-Hålogaland
