= Hans Guttorm =

Norwegian politician

Hans Guttorm (29 June 1927 – 25 September 2013) was a Norwegian politician for the Labour Party.

He served as a deputy representative to the Parliament of Norway from Finnmark during the term 1965–1969. He later served in the Sami Parliament from 1989 to 1993. He was also a member of the Sami Educational Council from 1980 to 1983 and chairman of the Sami Development Fund.
