= Karasjohka =

Karasjohka (Norwegian); Kárášjohka (Northern Sami); Kaarasjoki (Kven)
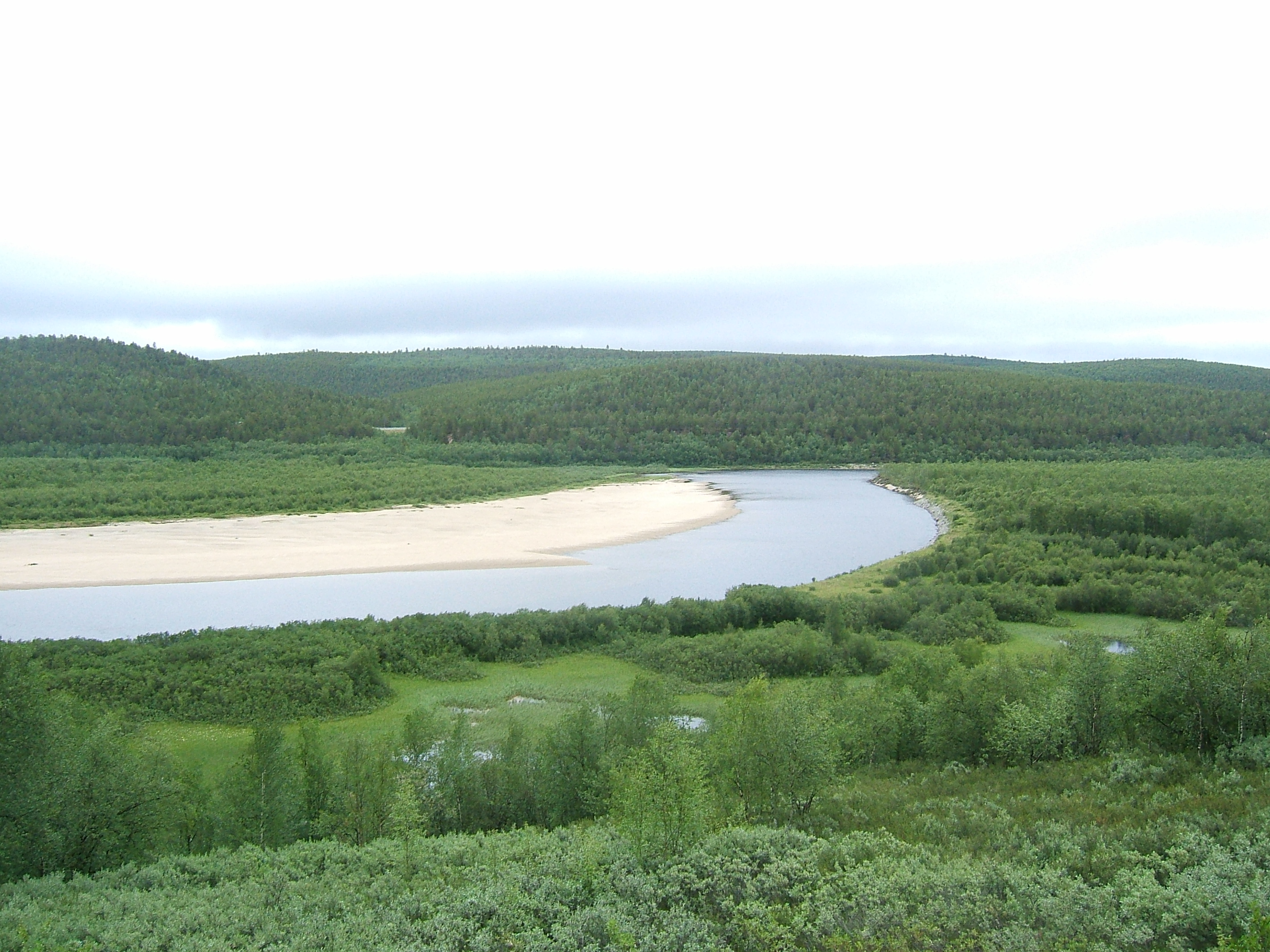
- View of the river
- Interactive map of the river

Location
- Country: Norway
- County: Finnmark
- Municipalities: Karasjok, Kautokeino

Physical characteristics
- Source: Nuorttit Rávdojávri lake
  - location: Kautokeino, Finnmark
  - coordinates: 68°43′56″N 24°15′18″E
  - elevation: 519 metres (1,703 ft)
- Mouth: Tana River
  - location: Karasjok, Finnmark
  - coordinates: 69°26′03″N 25°48′13″E
  - elevation: 125 metres (410 ft)
- Length: 161 km (100 mi)
- Basin size: 4,948 km^{2} (1,910 sq mi)

Basin features
- Tributaries
  - left: Iešjohka
  - right: Bávttajohka

Karasjohka (Norwegian), Kárášjohka (Northern Sami), or Kaarasjoki (Kven) is a river in Finnmark county, Norway. The 161-kilometre (100 mi) long river runs through Kautokeino Municipality and Karasjok Municipality. It is one of the most important rivers that drains the Finnmarksvidda plateau. It flows into the famous salmon-fishing Tana River near the Finnish village of Karigasniemi on the Norway-Finland border.

The river begins at the small Norwegian lake of Nuorttit Rávdojávri which lies inside the Anárjohka National Park, just inside the border with Finland. The river begins high on the Finnmarksvidda plateau and then flows north through Kautokeino and Karasjok municipalities. About 15 kilometres (9.3 mi) west of the village of Karasjok, the river turns and heads to the east. At its confluence with the river Anarjohka, the two rivers form the Tana River. The Karasjohka river drains a watershed of 4,948 square kilometres (1,910 sq mi). The European route E06 highway runs along the northern bank of the last 10 kilometres (6.2 mi) of the river.

== Media gallery ==
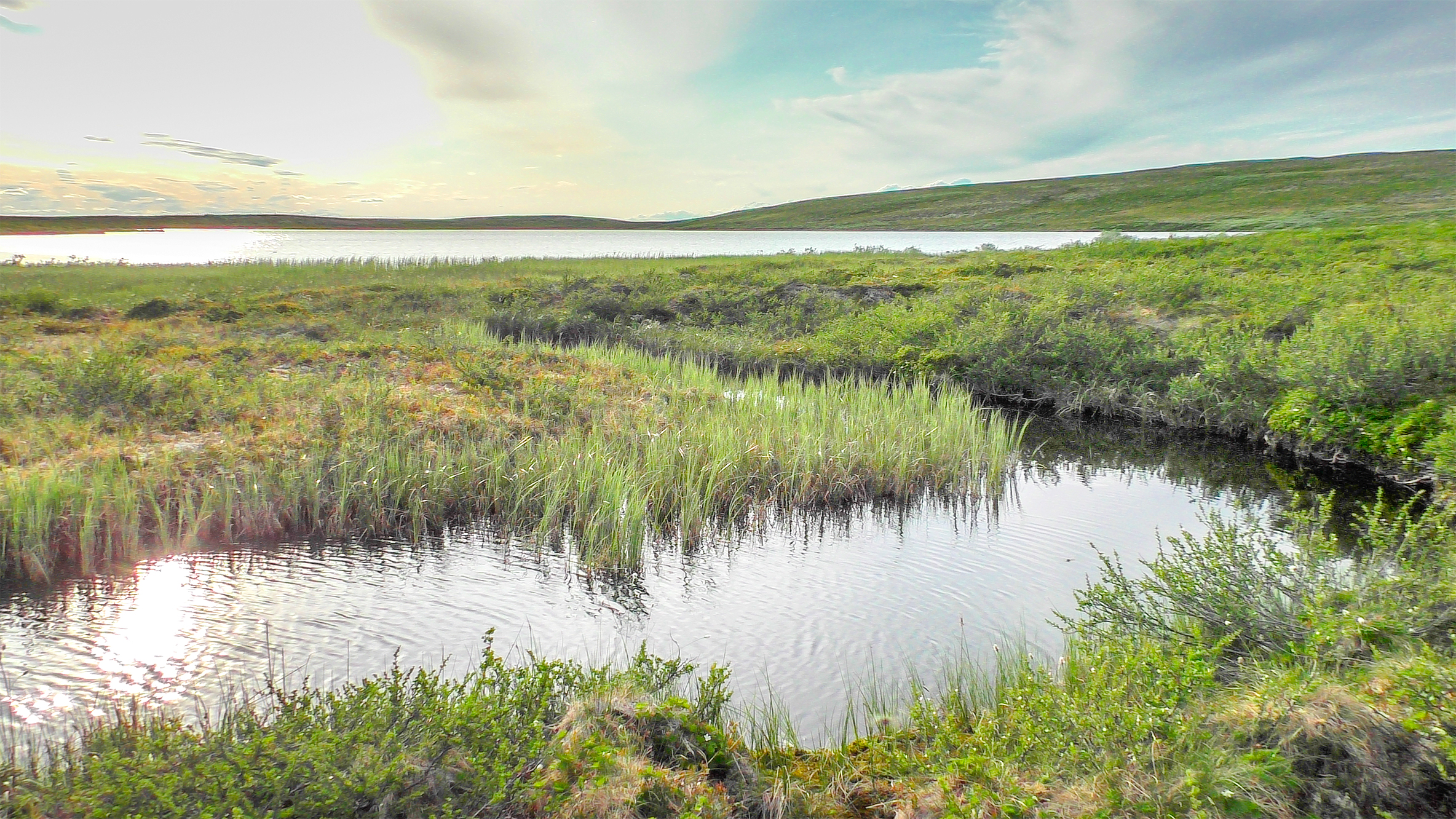
The river at its source Lake Nuorttit Rávdojávri.

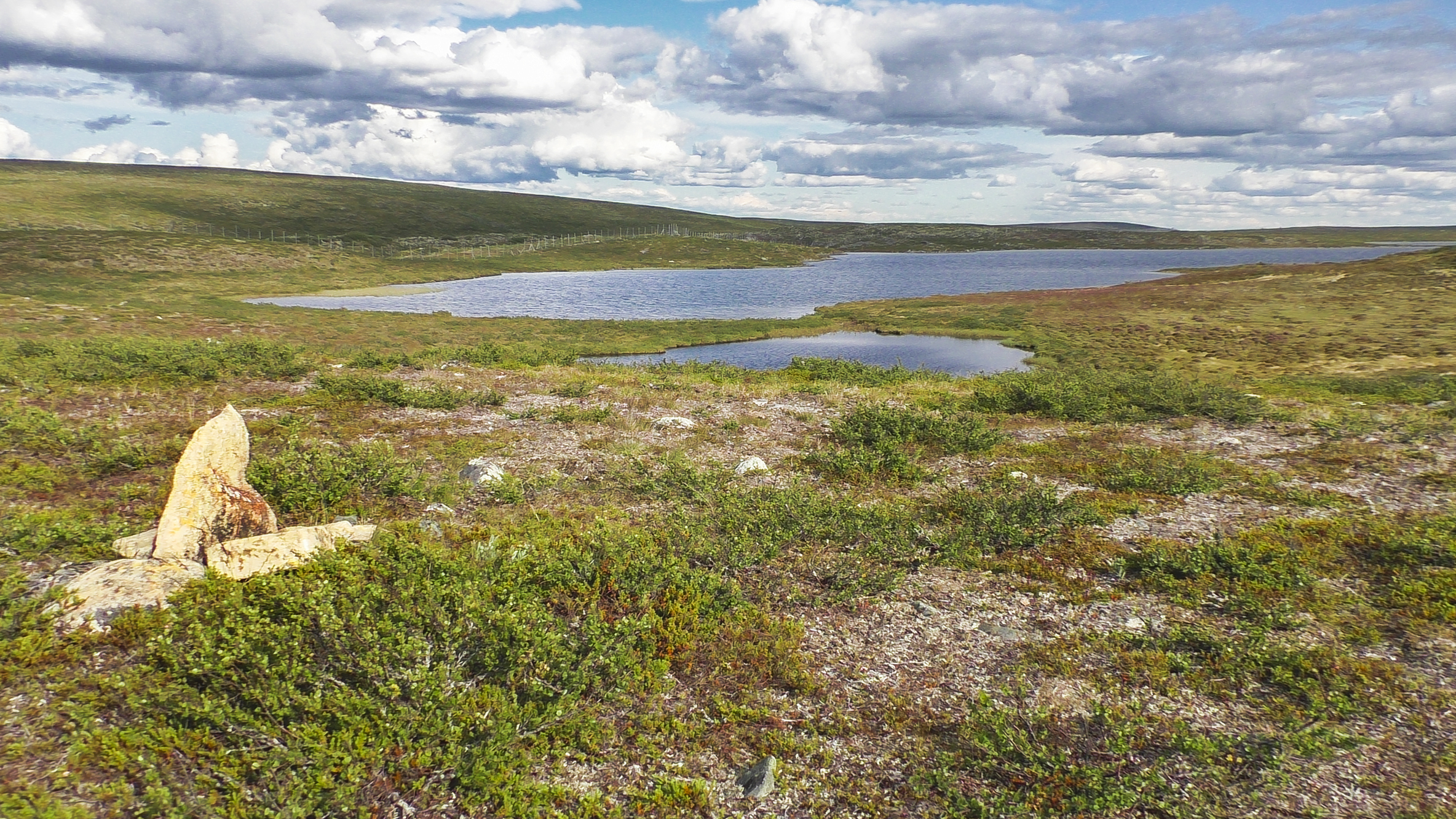
The Finnish-Norwegian border closely follows the watershed at the source.
