= Karigasniemi =

Village in Lapland, Finnmark

Karigasniemi (Finnish) Gáregasnjárga (Northern Sami)
- Village
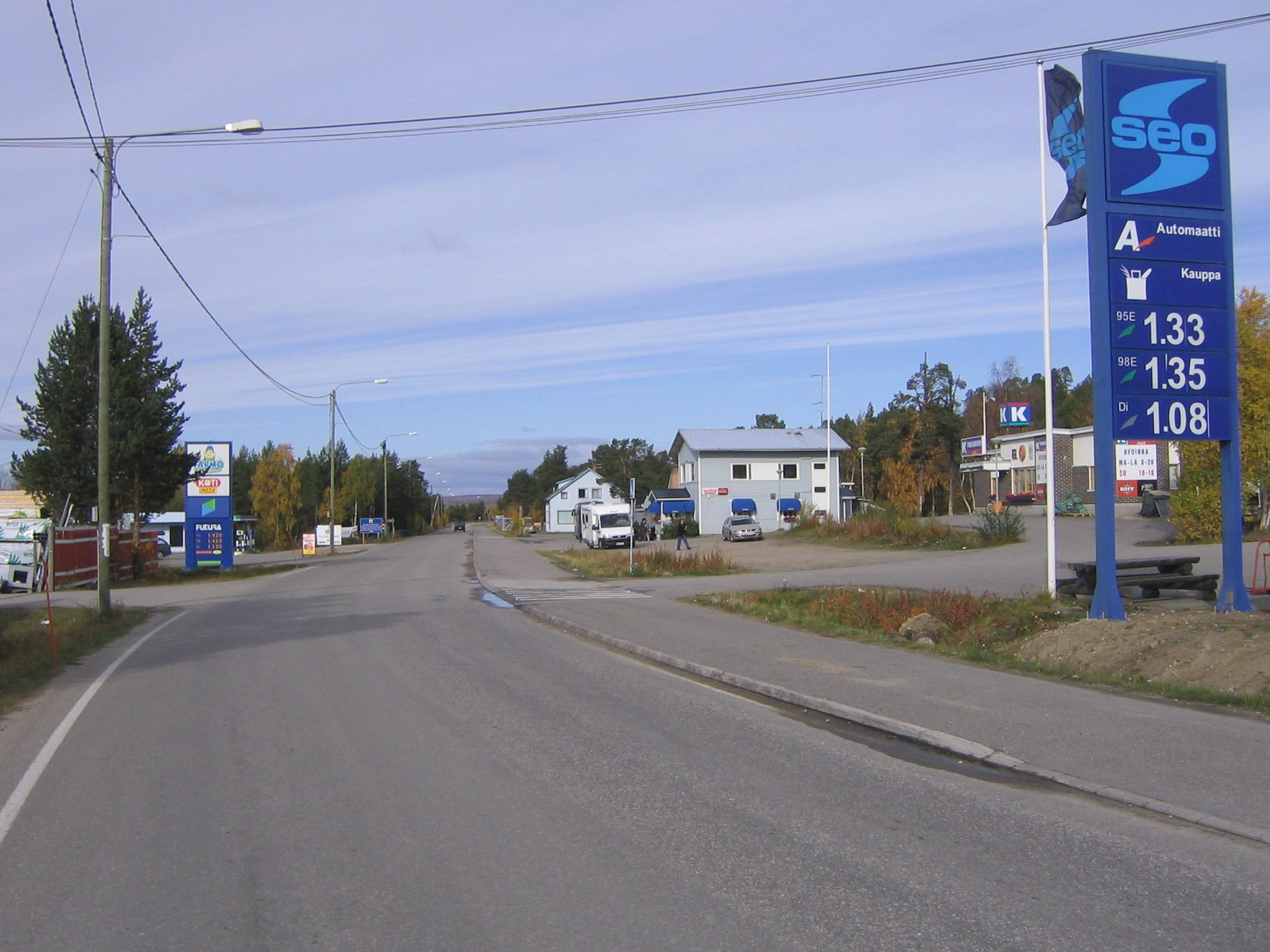

- Location in Finland
- Coordinates: 69°23′54″N 25°51′18″E
- Country: Finland
- Province: Lapland
- Municipality: Utsjoki

Population
  - Total: 300
- Time zone: UTC+2 (EET)

Karigasniemi (Northern Sami: Gáregasnjárga) is a village in the municipality of Utsjoki in Finland. It lies at the foot of Mount Ailigás.

The village is situated on the border between Norway and Finland 18 kilometres (11 mi) south-east of the Norwegian village of Karasjok. It lies on the banks of the river Inarijoki (Anarjohka), which, downstream of Karigasniemi, joins the river Karasjohka to form the famous salmon fishing river Tana.

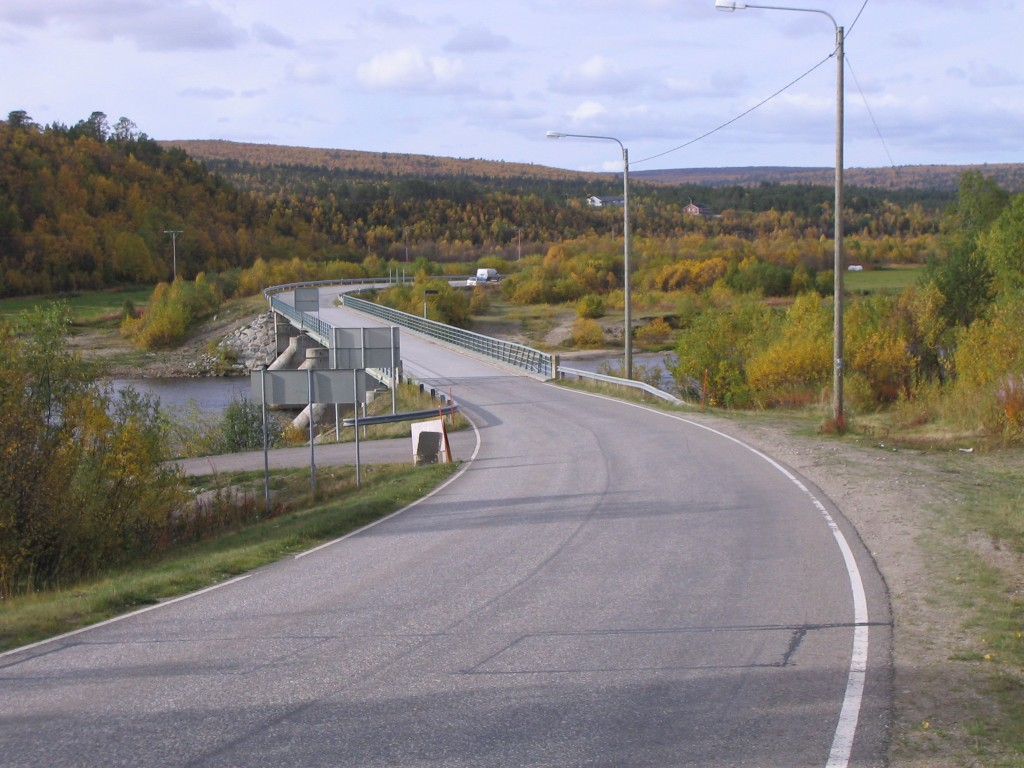
The border-crossing bridge over the Inarijoki river in Karigasniemi, to Dorvonjárga in Norway.

Karigasniemi lies on the road between the Finnish town of Ivalo and Lakselv in Norway.

Karigasniemi is home to about 500 people, of which more than half are Sámi. There is one grocery store, two petrol stations and three bars and restaurants, mostly because of a lot of border traffic from the Norwegian side. There is also a school and a small health care center in the village.

Karigasniemi is also a junction point where travelers can choose the road to Nordkapp or other places at the Arctic Ocean.
