= Finnmarksvidda =

Norwegian plateau

Finnmarksvidda Finnmárkkoduottar (Northern Sami)
- Plateau
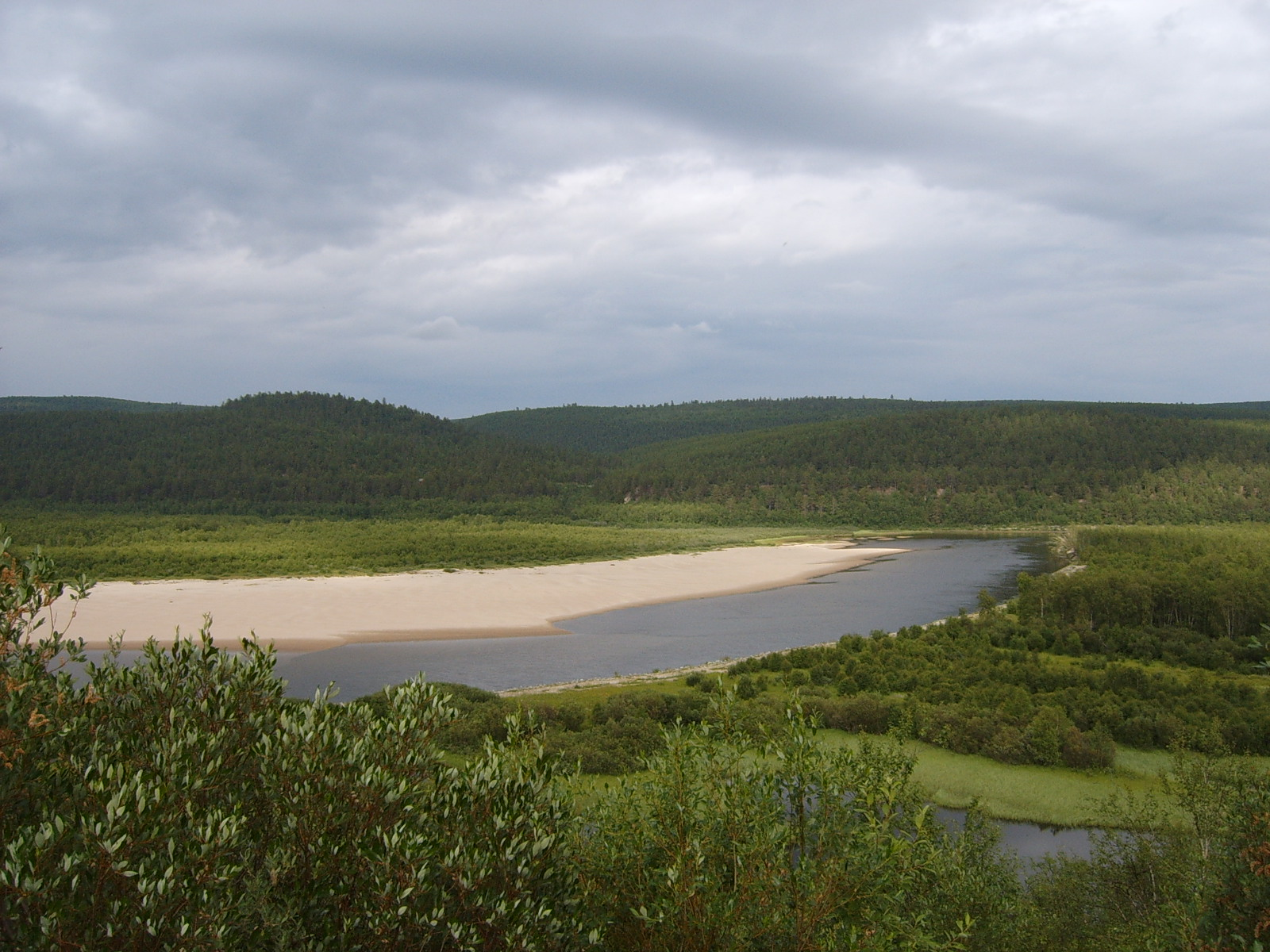
- The lowest elevations can be found in the eastern part of Finnmarksvidda, near Karasjok and Tana. River valleys in the area are only 100–250 m (300–800 ft) above sea level.
- Interactive map of the lake
- Coordinates: 69°19′N 23°49′E
- Location: Finnmark, Norway

Area
  - Total: 22,000 km^{2} (8,500 sq mi)
- Elevation: 300 to 500 m (980 to 1,640 ft)

Finnmarksvidda (Northern Sami: Finnmárkkoduottar; English: Finnmark plateau/highland) is Norway's largest plateau, with an area greater than 22,000 square kilometres (8,500 sq mi). The plateau lies about 300 to 500 metres (980 to 1,640 ft) above sea level. Approximately 36% of Finnmark lies on the Finnmarksvidda.

== Geography ==
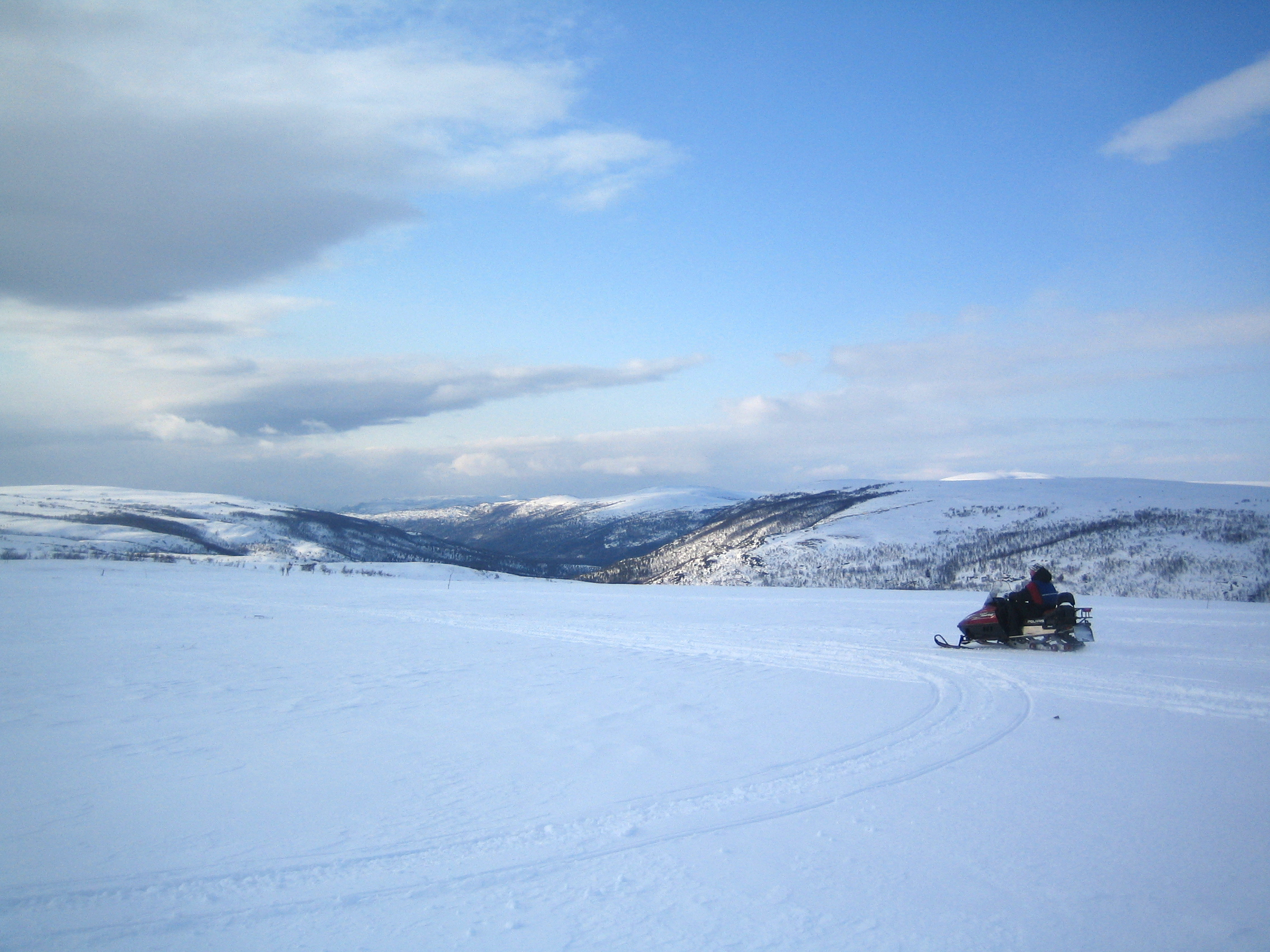
Finnmarksvidda near Alta. Altaelva valley is in the background.

From Alta Municipality in the west to the Varanger Peninsula in the east it stretches for approximately 300 kilometres (190 mi), being at least that wide from north to south, extending into Finland. The southeastern part of the plateau is protected by the Anárjohka National Park. The 1,409 square kilometres (544 sq mi) park opened in 1976.

Some circular lakes in Finnmarksvidda may be remnants of collapsed pingos that developed during cold periods of the last deglaciation.

== Fauna and flora ==
The plateau includes extensive birch woods, pine barrens, bogs, and glacially formed lakes. Finnmarksvidda is situated north of the Arctic Circle and is best known as the land of the once nomadic Sami people and their reindeer herds. Their shelters in the tundra are still used in the winter time.

== Climate ==
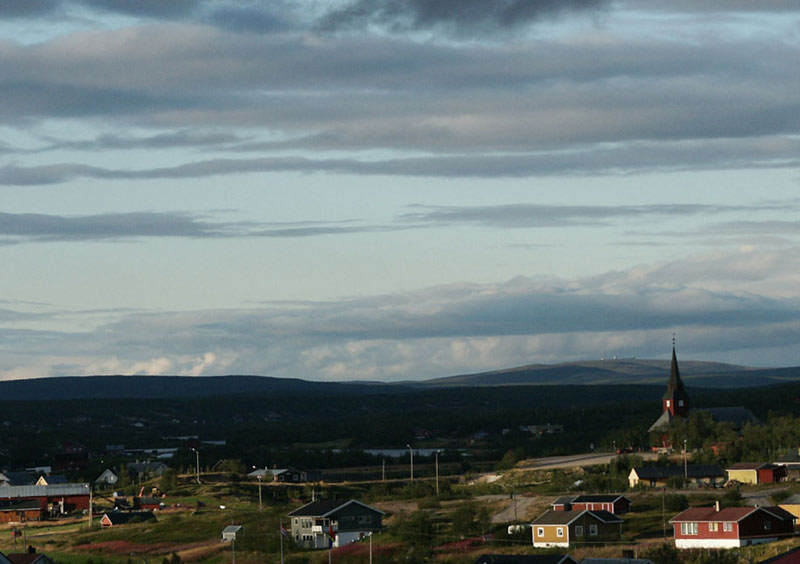
Kautokeino municipality is Norway's largest by area. Within its borders is the coldest village in continental Norway, Šihččajávri.

Finnmarksvidda, located in the interior of the county, has a subarctic climate with the coldest winter temperatures in Norway: the coldest temperature ever recorded was −51.4 °C (−60.5 °F) in Karasjok on 1 January 1886. The climate of Kautokeino (307 m) represents the climate of the plateau.

Šihččajávri, 382m, is a weather station by the lake of the same name. It is situated high on the plateau and far inland, approximately 13 km (8 mi) from the E45 border crossing with Norway and Finland.

Climate data for Šihččajávri (1991−2020 normals, extremes 1913−present): 382 m (1,253 ft)
Month	Jan	Feb	Mar	Apr	May	Jun	Jul	Aug	Sep	Oct	Nov	Dec	Year
Record high °C (°F)	4.8 (40.6)	5.6 (42.1)	5.8 (42.4)	12.8 (55.0)	27.1 (80.8)	34.3 (93.7)	30.5 (86.9)	28.8 (83.8)	22.0 (71.6)	13.0 (55.4)	9.4 (48.9)	5.5 (41.9)	34.3 (93.7)
Mean maximum °C (°F)	0.8 (33.4)	1.1 (34.0)	2.7 (36.9)	7.0 (44.6)	16.1 (61.0)	22.5 (72.5)	23.6 (74.5)	22.0 (71.6)	16.2 (61.2)	8.5 (47.3)	2.2 (36.0)	2.1 (35.8)	25.1 (77.2)
Mean daily maximum °C (°F)	−8.9 (16.0)	−8.9 (16.0)	−4.7 (23.5)	0.7 (33.3)	6.6 (43.9)	13.8 (56.8)	17.4 (63.3)	15.0 (59.0)	9.3 (48.7)	1.1 (34.0)	−4.5 (23.9)	−6.9 (19.6)	2.6 (36.7)
Daily mean °C (°F)	−13.2 (8.2)	−13.2 (8.2)	−9.5 (14.9)	−3.9 (25.0)	2.5 (36.5)	9.1 (48.4)	12.8 (55.0)	10.7 (51.3)	5.6 (42.1)	−1.6 (29.1)	−7.9 (17.8)	−10.8 (12.6)	−1.6 (29.1)
Mean daily minimum °C (°F)	−18.9 (−2.0)	−18.9 (−2.0)	−15.3 (4.5)	−9.0 (15.8)	−1.7 (28.9)	4.6 (40.3)	8.2 (46.8)	6.1 (43.0)	1.8 (35.2)	−5.0 (23.0)	−12.4 (9.7)	−16.3 (2.7)	−6.3 (20.7)
Mean minimum °C (°F)	−35.5 (−31.9)	−34.3 (−29.7)	−30.5 (−22.9)	−24.2 (−11.6)	−10.8 (12.6)	−1.1 (30.0)	1.5 (34.7)	−2.1 (28.2)	−5.6 (21.9)	−18.1 (−0.6)	−26.4 (−15.5)	−31.7 (−25.1)	−38.2 (−36.8)
Record low °C (°F)	−45.5 (−49.9)	−47.8 (−54.0)	−42.6 (−44.7)	−34.5 (−30.1)	−24.5 (−12.1)	−7.4 (18.7)	−3.2 (26.2)	−7.0 (19.4)	−15.4 (4.3)	−34.1 (−29.4)	−38.9 (−38.0)	−40.6 (−41.1)	−47.8 (−54.0)
Average precipitation mm (inches)	28.5 (1.12)	26.2 (1.03)	22.1 (0.87)	23.5 (0.93)	38.9 (1.53)	73.7 (2.90)	91.6 (3.61)	92.2 (3.63)	61.2 (2.41)	50.4 (1.98)	37.4 (1.47)	31.2 (1.23)	576.9 (22.71)
Average precipitation days (≥ 1.0 mm)	7	7	6	6	8	10	12	11	10	9	8	8	102
Source 1: WMO
Source 2: Norwegian Meteorological Institute
