= Karasjok (village) =

Village in Karasjok, Norway

Karasjok: Karasjok (Norwegian); Kárášjohka (Northern Sami); Kaarasjoki (Kven)
- Village
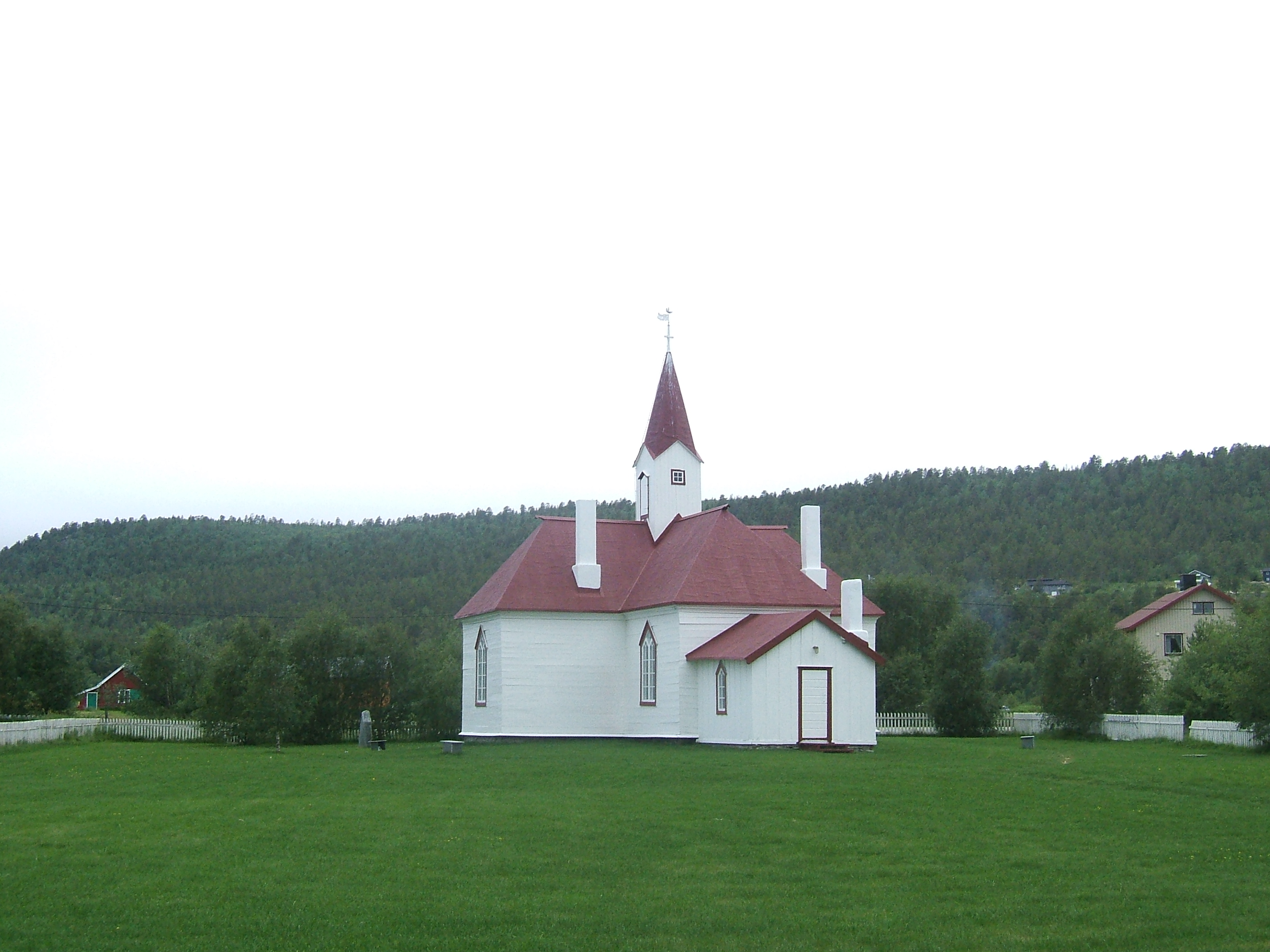
- View of the historic church in the village
- Interactive map of Karasjok
- Location within Finnmark Location within Norway
- Coordinates: 69.4719°N 25.5112°E
- Country: Norway
- Region: Northern Norway
- County: Finnmark
- District: Vest-Finnmark
- Municipality: Karasjok

Area
  - Total: 2.24 km^{2} (0.86 sq mi)
- Elevation: 141 m (463 ft)

Population (2023)
  - Total: 1,746
  - Density: 779/km^{2} (2,020/sq mi)
- Time zone: UTC+01:00 (CET)
  - Summer (DST): UTC+02:00 (CEST)
- Post Code: 9730 Karasjok

Karasjok (Norwegian), Kárášjohka (Northern Sami), or Kaarasjoki (Kven) is the administrative centre of Karasjok Municipality in Finnmark county, Norway. The village is located along both sides of the Karasjohka river, just 12 kilometres (7.5 mi) west of the Norway-Finland border. The European route E06 highway runs through the village on its way from Lakselv to Tana bru and Kirkenes. The 2.24-square-kilometre (550-acre) village has a population (2023) of 1,746 and a population density of 779 inhabitants per square kilometre (2,020/sq mi).

The village is an important centre in the municipality and region. About two-thirds of the municipal population lives in the village. The Sami Parliament of Norway is located in the village. It acts as an institution of cultural autonomy for the indigenous Sami people in Norway. The Old Karasjok Church and the newer Karasjok Church are located in the village. The newer church is also the seat of the Indre Finnmark prosti (deanery) of the Church of Norway.

== History ==
Before the beginning of the 1700s, there might not have been a permanent settlement there, but the area was used by nomads.

=== Early 1800s ===
The Stromeng family set up a blacksmith shop that still sell knives to the Norwegian military today.

=== World War II ===
During World War II a Nazi concentration camp was built in Karasjok: Lager IV Karasjok (German for "Karasjok Camp No.4", Norwegian: Karasjok fangeleir). The camp was run by SS, and it was among the first four Nazi concentration camps in Northern Norway.

In July 1943, 374 political prisoners and POWs prisoners (mostly Yugoslavs) were brought to the concentration camp. They were tasked with widening the road to Karigasniemi, Finland. After four or five months, only 111 of these prisoners were still alive. At the end of the prisoners' stay in Karasjok, before transportation out of Karasjok, 45 prisoners were massacred by the firing of small arms. At least one former prisoner was still alive in 2013.

== See also ==
- Prison camps in North Norway during World War Two
