= Matus =

Matus can be both a given name and surname. Common variants include Matúš, Matuš, and Matůš. Notable people with the name include:

== Given name ==
- Matúš Bero (born 1995), Slovak footballer
- Matus Bisnovat (1905–1977), Soviet aircraft and missile designer
- Matúš Bubeník (born 1990), Slovak high jump athlete
- Matúš Čonka (born 1990), Slovak footballer
- Matúš Chovan (born 1992), Slovak ice hockey player
- Matúš Hruška (born 1994), Slovak footballer
- Matúš Kira (born 1994), Slovak footballer
- Matúš Kostúr (born 1980), Slovak ice hockey player
- Matúš Kozáčik (born 1983), Slovak footballer
- Matúš Lacko (born 1987), Slovak footballer
- Matúš Leskovjanský Slovak ice hockey player
- Matúš Macík (born 1993), Slovak footballer
- Matúš Marcin (born 1994), Slovak footballer
- Matúš Mikuš (born 1991), Slovak footballer
- Matúš Paločko, Slovak ice hockey player
- Matúš Paukner (born 1991), Slovak footballer
- Matúš Pekár (born 1984), Slovak footballer
- Matúš Putnocký (born 1984), Slovak footballer
- Matúš Ružinský (born 1992), Slovak footballer
- Matúš Šutaj Eštok (born 1987), Slovak politician
- Matúš Tomko (born 1978), Slovak opera singer
- Matúš Turňa (born 1986), Slovak footballer
- Matúš Vallo (born 1977), Slovak politician and Mayor of Bratislava
- Matúš Viedenský (born 1992), Slovak ice hockey player
- Matúš Vizváry (born 1989), Slovak ice hockey player

== Surname ==
- Alejandra Matus (born 1966), Chilean journalist and writer
- Irvin Leigh Matus (1941–2011), American scholar, autodidact and author
- Don Juan Matus asserted to be Yaqui Roadman/Curandero to UCLA anthropologist Carlos Castaneda and protagonist of Castaneda's series “Don Juan” books.
- Lukáš Matůš (born 1980), Czech footballer
- Marlene Matus (1939–2014), Ukrainian photographer and educator
- Martin Matúš (born 1982), Slovak footballer
- Michael Matus (actor), British actor
- Michael Matus (canoeist), Czechoslovak sprint canoeist
- Radim Matuš (born 1993), Czech ice hockey player
- Željko Matuš (born 1935), Croatian footballer
