= Mel Andrews =

British athlete

Mel Andrews (born 14 October 1980) is a British adventurer and athlete, specializing as a Musher in Dogsled Racing. On 5 February 2013, she became the first British woman to finish Europe's biggest sled dog race, Femundløpet. A month later Andrews broke the record for fastest GB rookie to finish the World's longest 8-dog race Finnmarksløpet.

== Early life and education ==
As a teenager, Andrews was a skilled swimmer and worked as a beach lifeguard. At 17, Andrew served in the army, and continued swimming.

Andrews rowed for City of Oxford Rowing Club, competing at the Women's Eights Head of the River Race in London and at many regattas. In 2004, she captained her team to success at Cambridge regatta.

== Career ==
In 2009, Andrews turned down a place at Medical School and left the RAMC, to spend eight winter months, wilderness camping with 20 sleddogs and exploring Jotunheimen; North Europe's highest mountain range and the Norwegian Arctic. The Norwegian sled dog magazine Hundekjøring published an article about the adventure written by Johanne Sundby.

In 2011, Andrews raced seven stages of La Grande Odyssee in the French and Swiss Alps and represented Great Britain at the IFSS World Championships.

In 2012, Andrews featured in Cow Prod's 3D movie 'Mushers', and in 2011 Animal Planet's TV series 'Extraordinary Dogs'.

In 2013 Andrews moved with her husband Nigel to Norway, spending much of her time at Norwegian training bases as well as returning to her home in Andover, Hampshire. Andrews owns a kennel of Alaskan Huskies and Siberian Huskies. She is the co-owner and a guide of the extreme adventure company Dogsledding Expeditions.

Andrews is a patron for Veterans in Action, a UK charity supporting the recovery of British Soldiers.

In January 2016 Andrews began training in Norway for the Finnmark 1000 km in March. She entered the race, but had to pull out on the second day because of problems with the health of her team.
