= Vuolit Spielgajávri =

Lake in Kautokeino, Norway

- Interactive map of the lake
- Location: Kautokeino, Finnmark
- Coordinates: 69.262°N 23.329°E
- Basin countries: Norway
- Max. length: 5 kilometres (3.1 mi)
- Max. width: 800 metres (2,600 ft)
- Surface area: 3.31 km^{2} (1.28 sq mi)
- Shore length^{1}: 13 kilometres (8.1 mi)
- Surface elevation: 436 metres (1,430 ft)
- References: NVE
- ^{1} Shore length is not a well-defined measure.

Vuolit Spielgajávri is a lake in Kautokeino Municipality in Finnmark county, Norway. The lake lies on the Finnmarksvidda plateau, about 25 kilometres (16 mi) southwest of the village of Masi and about 30 kilometres (19 mi) north of the village of Kautokeino. The lake Bajit Spielgajávri lies just 400 metres (1,300 ft) to the west of this lake.

== See also ==
- List of lakes in Norway
