= Finnmarksløpet =

Sled dog race in Norway

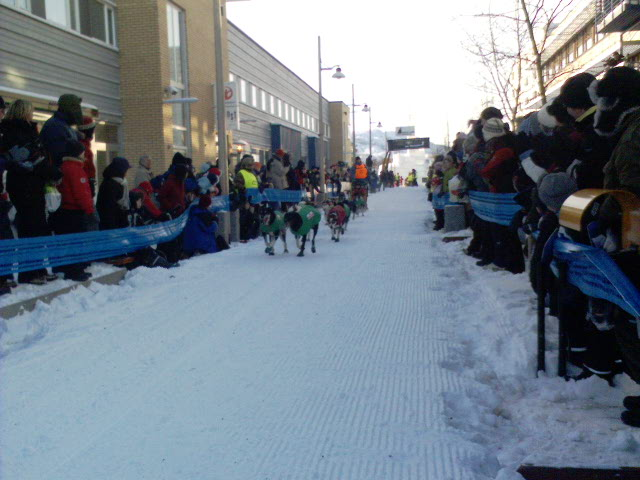
Finnmarksløpet 2006

Finnmarksløpet is a long distance sled dog race organized every year since 1981 in Finnmark, Norway. Finnmarksløpet is the longest sled race in Europe.

== History ==
The first Finnmarksløpet was hosted in 1981 with only one "open" class and a total of three teams entering the first race. Over the years, the race has experienced substantial growth, both in terms of participants and audience. In 1985, a second "limited" class was introduced. By 1992, the race distance was extended to 1,000 kilometres (620 mi), with the open class setting a maximum of 12 dogs, while the limited class was restricted to 8-dog and a distance of 600 kilometres (370 mi). In 2000, the open class was expanded further to include up to 14 dogs, and the limited class distance was reduced to 500 kilometres (310 mi). In 2018, the open class was further extended to its current length at 1,200 kilometres (750 mi), making Finnmarksløpet the longest sled dog race in Europe and the second longest sled race in the world. A junior class open to mushers 14 to 18 years of age has also been added, with a distance of 200 kilometres (120 mi). The 2021 race was canceled due to the COVID-19 pandemic. In 2025, the open class was shortened to 1,107 kilometres (688 mi) due to warm weather and parts of the course not sufficiently freezing.

== Race ==
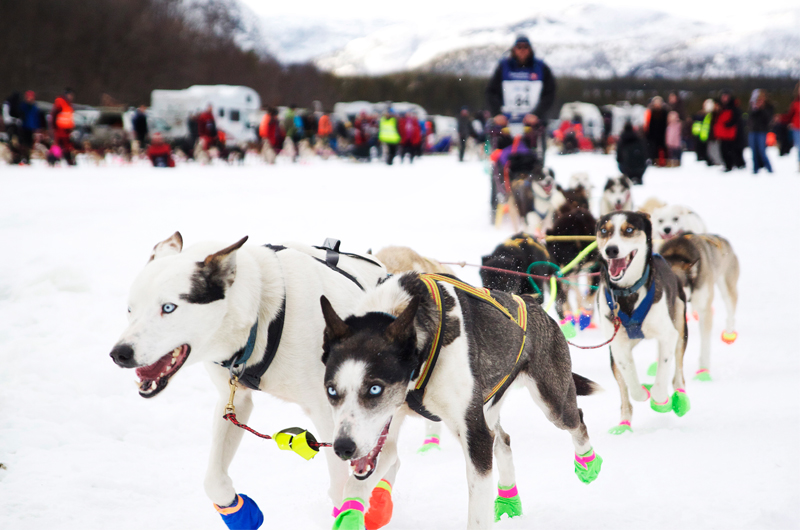
Sled dog team racing in Finnmarksløpet

All classes begin in Alta before crossing Norway's largest plateau, Finnmarksvidda. The open class proceeds to Kirkenes and then turning back to Alta. The limited class heads to first Kautokeino and then Levajok, a hamlet near Tana before heading back to Alta.

Participants in Finnmarksløpet come from all over Europe. To participate in the open class, participants must have previously completed the Finnmarksløpet in limited class, Femundløpet, Bergebyløpet N70, Gold Rush Run 501 or another race at least 500 kilometres (310 mi) in length in the past five years. Roger Dahl is the oldest participant, completing the Finnmarksløpet for the 28th time in 2025 at the age of 73. Harsh weather conditions are common on Finnmarksvidda which has a subarctic climate with the coldest winter temperatures in Norway.

== Open Class ==
Daily stages, totaling 1243 km

- Stage 1 : Alta – Kautokeino, 168 km
- Stage 2 : Kautokeino – Jergul, 101 km
- Stage 3 : Jergul – Levajok, 122 km
- Stage 4 : Levajok – Tana, 100 km
- Stage 5 : Tana – Neiden, 100 km
- Stage 6 : Neiden – Övre Pasvik, 78 km
- Stage 7 : Övre Pasvik – Kirkenes, 86 km
- Stage 8 : Kirkenes - Neiden, 71 km
- Stage 9 : Neiden – Varangerbotn, 82 km
- Stage 10 : Varangerbotn – Levajok, 70 km
- Stage 11: Levajok – Karasjok, 83 km
- Stage 12: Karasjok – Jotka, 82 km
- Stage 13: Jotka – Alta, 49 km

=== Winners ===
Year	Winning Time	Winner	Home town
2026	6 days 15 hours 41 min	Petter Karlsson	Slussfors
2025	6 days 8 hours 38 min	Harald Tunheim	Alta
2024	7 days 9 hours 30 min	Petter Karlsson	Slussfors
2023	6 days 19 hours 35 min	Petter Karlsson	Slussfors
2022	6 days 14 hours 44 min	Thomas Wærner	Torpa
2020/2021	Called off (COVID-19 pandemic)		
2019	6 days 18 hours 38 min	Thomas Wærner	Torpa
2018	7 days 2 hours 47 min	Petter Karlsson	Slussfors
2017	6 days 9 hours 8 min	Petter Jahnsen	Tufsingdalen
2016	6 days 00 hours 3 min	Petter Karlsson	Slussfors, Sweden
2015	6 days 03 hours 21 min	Sigrid Ekran	Lomsjødalen
2014	5 days 19 hours 16 min	Sigrid Ekran	Lomsjødalen
2013	5 days 19 hours 55 min	Thomas Wærner	Torpa
2012	6 days 01 hours 40 min	Inger-Marie Haaland	Fagerheim Fjellstugu
2011	5 days 09 hours 25 min	Roger Dahl	Alta
2010	5 days 09 hours 15 min	Ralph Johannesen	Fagerheim Fjellstugu
2009	5 days 06 hours 50 min	Inger-Marie Haaland	Fagerheim Fjellstugu
2008	6 days 02 hours 35 min	Harald Tunheim	Alta
2007	5 days 20 hours 49 min	Tore Bergby	Luksefjell
2006	5 days 18 hours 18 min	Harald Tunheim	Alta
2005	5 days 23 hours 52 min	Roger Dahl	Alta
2004	6 days 10 hours 24 min	Bjørnar Andersen	Oslo
2003	6 days 3 hours 32 min	Rune Johansen	Alta
2002	5 days 5 hours 8 min	Rune Johansen	Alta
2001	4 days 20 hours 32 min	Robert Sørlie	Hurdal
2000	4 days 19 hours 37 min	Kjetil Backen	Porsgrunn
1999	5 days 4 hours 38 min	Robert Sørlie	Hakadal
1998	4 days 13 hours 4 min	Harald Tunheim	Alta
1997	5 days 3 hours 8 min	Harald Tunheim	Alta
1996	4 days 14 hours 57 min	Harald Tunheim	Alta
1995	5 days 13 hours 28 min	Robert Sørlie	Hakadal
1994	5 days 12 hours 17 min	Sven Engholm	Karasjok
1993	5 days 13 hours 21 min	Sven Engholm	Karasjok
1992	5 days 12 hours 5 min	Roger Dahl	Alta
1991	4 days 21 hours 57 min	Sven Engholm	Karasjok
1990	4 days 14 hours 33 min	Sven Engholm	Karasjok
1989	?	Stein Håvard Fjestad	Stange
1988	?	Sven Engholm	Karasjok
1987	?	Karl Petter Beldo	Alta
1986	?	Stein Håvard Fjestad	Stange
1985	?	Sven Engholm	Karasjok
1984	?	Sven Engholm	Karasjok
1983	?	Sven Engholm	Karasjok
1982	?	Sven Engholm	Karasjok
1981	?	Sven Engholm	Karasjok

== Limited Class ==
Daily stages, totalling 609 km

- Stage 1: Alta – Kautokeino, 168 km
- Stage 2: Kautokeino – Jergul, 100 km
- Stage 3: Jergul – Levajok, 127 km
- Stage 4: Levajok – Karasjok, 83 km
- Stage 5: Karasjok – Jotka, 82 km
- Stage 6: Jotka – Alta 49 km

=== Winners ===
Year	Winning Time	Winner	Home town
2026	2 days 21 hours 59 min	Cato Myhre	Lånke
2025	2 days 23 hours 46 min	Bjørnar Andersen	Oslo
2024	2 days 18 hours 2 min	Ronny Wingren	Socklot
2023	2 days 15 hours 33 min	Harald Tunheim	Alta
2022	2 days 15 hours 46 min	Ronny Wingren	Socklot
2021	Called off		
2020	2 days 19 hours 34 min	Daniel Haagensen	Tomter
2019	2 days 14 hours 23 min	Hanna Lyrek	Alta
2018	2 days 17 hours 20 min	Harald Tunheim	Alta
2017	2 days 16 hours 47 min	Elisabeth Edland	Nannestad
2016	2 days 16 hours 52 min	Ole Sigleif Johansen	Rødberg
2015	2 days 4 hours 1 min	Elisabeth Edland	Nannestad
2014	2 days 3 hours 51 min	Ronny Wingren	Socklot
2013	2 days 3 hours 12 min	Milos Gonda	Spišská Nová Ves
2012	2 days 3 hours 59 min	Katy Meier	Slagnäs, Sweden
2011	2 days 2 hours 59 min	Elisabeth Edland	Nannestad
2010	2 days 2 hours 41 min	Ole Wingren	Nykarleby
2009	2 days 3 hours 40 min	Arnt Ola Skjerve	Rennebu
2008	2 days 11 hours 27 min	Jan Vidar Dahle	Båtsfjord
2007	2 days 7 hours 36 min	Elisabeth Edland	Nannestad
2006	2 days 9 hours 3 min	Erle Frantzen	Ulnes
2005	2 days 5 hours 26 min	Hilde Askildt	Geilo
2004	2 days 3 hours 46 min	Stein Are Harder	Elvenes
2003	2 days 3 hours 57 min	Dag Torulf Olsen	Hammerfest
2002	2 days 11 hours 26 min	Markus Kyrre Leistad	Alta
2001	2 days 13 hours 37 min	Dag Torulf Olsen	Hammerfest
2000	2 days 13 hours 49 min	Abner Hykkerud	Alta
1999	No race held	-	-
1998	No race held	-	-
1997	3 days 13 hours 50 min	Abner Hykkerud	Alta
1996	3 days 2 hours 1 min	Rune Johansen	Alta
1995	3 days 11 hours 10 min	Eirik Nilsen	Alta
1994	3 days 11 hours 42 min	Karl Petter Beldo	Alta
1993	4 days 5 hours 40 min	Eirik Nilsen	Alta
1992	1 day 20 hours 36 min	Eirik Nilsen	Alta
1991	6 days 1 time 12 min	Jan Arne Jakobsen	Lakselv
1990	4 days 17hours 26 min	Torgeir Øren	Røros
1989	?	Egil Olli	Karasjok
1988	?	Arne Oddvar Nilsen	Alta
1987	?	Arne Oddvar Nilsen	Alta
1986	?	Sven Engholm	Karasjok
1985	?	Arne Oddvar Nilsen	Alta

== Junior Class ==
Daily stages, totalling 198 km

- Stage 1: Alta – Jotka, 49 km
- Stage 2: Jotka – Suossjavre, 47 km
- Stage 3: Suossjavre – Jotka, 53 km
- Stage 4: Jotka – Alta 49 km

=== Winners ===
Year	Winning Time	Winner	Home town				
2026	1 day 2 hours 36 min	Emma Walseth	Alta|-	2025	1 day 0 hours 53 min	Elisabeth Kristensen	Alta
2024	1 day 0 hours 40 min	Elisabeth Kristensen	Alta				
2023	1 day 0 hours 41 min	Elisabeth Kristensen	Alta				
2022	23 hours 46 min	Oda Karlstrøm					
2021	Called off						
2020	23 hours 49 min	Espen Burger	Svanvik				
2019	1 day 0 hours 33 min	Ole Henrik Isaksen Eira	Alta				
2018	1 day 0 hours 38 min	Ole Henrik Isaksen Eira	Alta				
2017	1 day 2 hours 11 min	Tuva Almås	Stord				
2016	1 day 1 hours 22 min	Hanna Lyrek	Alta				
2015	1 day 0 hours 58 min	Anette Børve Hernes	Eidfjord (village)				
2014	1 day 3 hours 6 min	Erik Loftsgård	Øygardsgrend				

== See also ==
- Arctic Alps Cup (La Grande Odyssée and Finnmarksløpet)
- Iditarod
- La Grande Odyssée (France and Switzerland)
- List of sled dog races
