= Bajit Spielgajávri =

Lake in Kautokeino, Norway

- Interactive map of the lake
- Location: Finnmark
- Coordinates: 69.2371°N 23.2646°E
- Basin countries: Norway
- Max. length: 4.5 kilometres (2.8 mi)
- Max. width: 1.2 kilometres (0.75 mi)
- Surface area: 3.2 km^{2} (1.2 sq mi)
- Shore length^{1}: 11.53 kilometres (7.16 mi)
- Surface elevation: 441 metres (1,447 ft)
- References: NVE
- ^{1} Shore length is not a well-defined measure.

Bajit Spielgajávri is a lake in Guovdageainnu Municipality (Kautokeino) in Finnmark county, Norway. The 3.2-square-kilometre (1.2 sq mi) lake lies less than 100 metres (330 ft) west of the lake Vuolit Spielgajávri and about 25 kilometres (16 mi) northeast of the village of Kautokeino.

== See also ==
- List of lakes in Norway
