= Petter Karlsson =

Swedish sleddog driver/musher

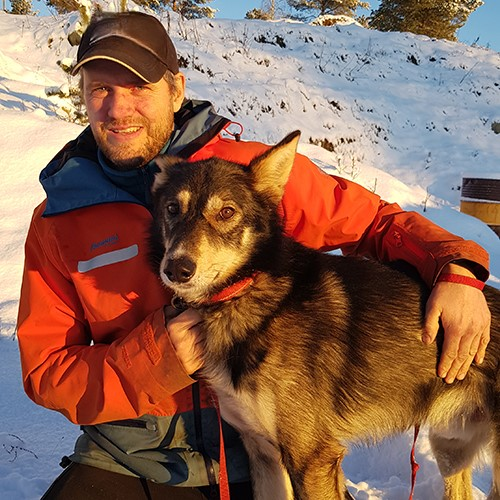
- Karlsson with his lead dog Hog

Personal information
- Nationality: Swedish
- Website: www.petterkarlsson.com

Sport
- Sport: Sleddog Racing

Achievements and titles
- World finals: World Champion Long Distance 2025; World Champion Long Distance 2023
Medal record
Medal record
Finnmarksløpet
Gold medal – first place	2024 Finnmarksløpet FL1200	
Gold medal – first place	2023 Finnmarksløpet FL1200	
Gold medal – first place	2018 Finnmarksløpet FL1200	
Gold medal – first place	2016 Finnmarksløpet FL1200	
Femundløpet
Gold medal – first place	2025 Femundløpet FL 650	
Gold medal – first place	2017 Femundløpet FL 650	
La Grande Odyssée
Gold medal – first place	2008 La Grande Odyssée	
Amundsen Race
Silver medal – second place	2013 Amundsen Race	
Silver medal – second place	2011 Amundsen Race	

Petter Karlsson (born 6 September 1975) is a Swedish musher and two-time world champion in long-distance sled dog racing. He has won the Finnmarksløpet dog sled race five times (2016, 2018, 2023, 2024 and 2026). In 2016, he was the first non-Norwegian to achieve this victory.

== Sporting career ==
Karlsson's mushing career began in the late 1990s. In 2005 he won the European Championship in Hamar, Norway.

Petter has mainly competed in long-distance races for decades. He won the La Grande Odyssée Savoie Mont Blanc in 2008 with a finish time of 36:03:51.

In 2016, he took part in the Europe's longest sled dog race, the Finnmarksløpet, for the first time. He was the first non-Norwegian to achieve this success, breaking the Norwegian dominance in this sport. The following year, he also won the Femundløpet.

In 2018, the Swede returned to Finnmarksløpet and was able to achieve a victory 7 minutes ahead of the Norwegian Birgitte Næss.

Karlsson was in the lead when the race in 2020 had to be stopped due to the COVID-19 pandemic. The race was also cancelled in the following years due to the pandemic.

The Finnmarksløpet 2023 was also the world championship in the long distance, which Karlsson won with a time of 6 days 19 hours 35 min.

In 2024, he won the Finnmarksløpet for the fourth time in a time of 7 days 9 hours 30 minutes. In addition to this victory, he was honoured with the Best Dog Care Award by the race vets.

In 2025, he won the Femundløpet again, defending his world championship title from 2023. He also set a new record for the distance.

Karlssons dogs have also competed in numerous races with other mushers, where they have achieved good results.

== Awards and honours ==
In addition to the various victories in his career, Karlsson has been honoured with several sports awards. In 2024 he was honoured by the Swedish Kennel Club with the Segebadenplaketten for his sporting achievements. He is the first in 11 years to receive this award.

At the Finnmarksløpet 2024 Karlsson was also honoured with the popular Best Dog Care Award, an award given by the official race veterinarians to the musher who has shown the greatest care for his dogs throughout the course of the race.

== Personal life ==
Karlsson is also a breeder of Alaskan huskies and runs a tourist kennel in Slussfors, where he offers 5-Day-Tours and expeditions for guests. His kennel currently consists of 90 dogs. In addition to dog sledding, Karlsson is a farmer. He is married and has three children. He lives with his family in Slussfors, Storuman, Sweden.

== Career highlights ==
Year	Pos	Race	Distance	Time	Notes	Ref
2025	1	Femundløpet	610 km	2d 17h 33m	World Championship	
2024	1	Finnmarksløpet	1243 km	09d 07h 30m		
2023	1	Finnmarksløpet	1209 km	06d 19h 35m	World Championship	
2018	1	Finnmarksløpet	1209 km	07d 02h 47m		
2017	1	Femundløpet	600 km			
2016	1	Finnmarksløpet	1047 km	06d 00h 03m		
2013	2	Amundsen Race	307 km	00d 20h 17m		
2011	2	Amundsen Race	349 km	01d 02h 46m		
2008	1	La Grande Odyssée	900 km	01d 12h 03m		
2005	1	European Championship		00d 05h 48m		

== See also ==
- Finnmarksløpet (Norway)
- La Grande Odyssée (France/Switzerland)
