= Theodor Posewitz =

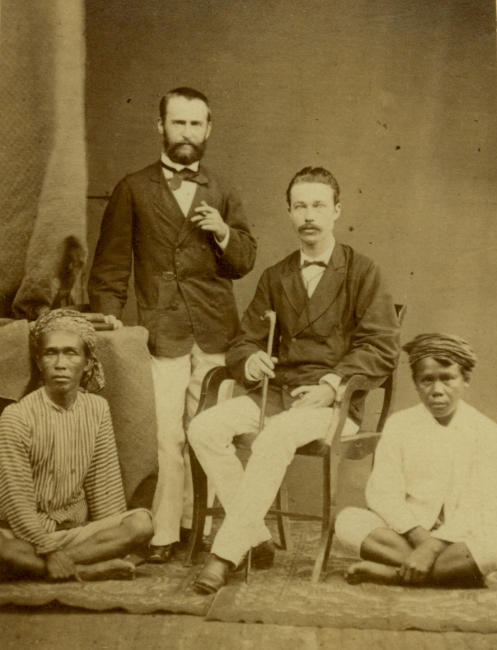
Posewitz in Java, standing left, 1879-80

Theodor Posewitz, in Hungarian form, Posewitz Tivadar (2 December 1851 – 12 June 1917) was a Hungarian physician and geologist. He travelled to Dutch Indonesia and wrote on the geology of Borneo, producing the first geological map of the region.

== Life and work ==
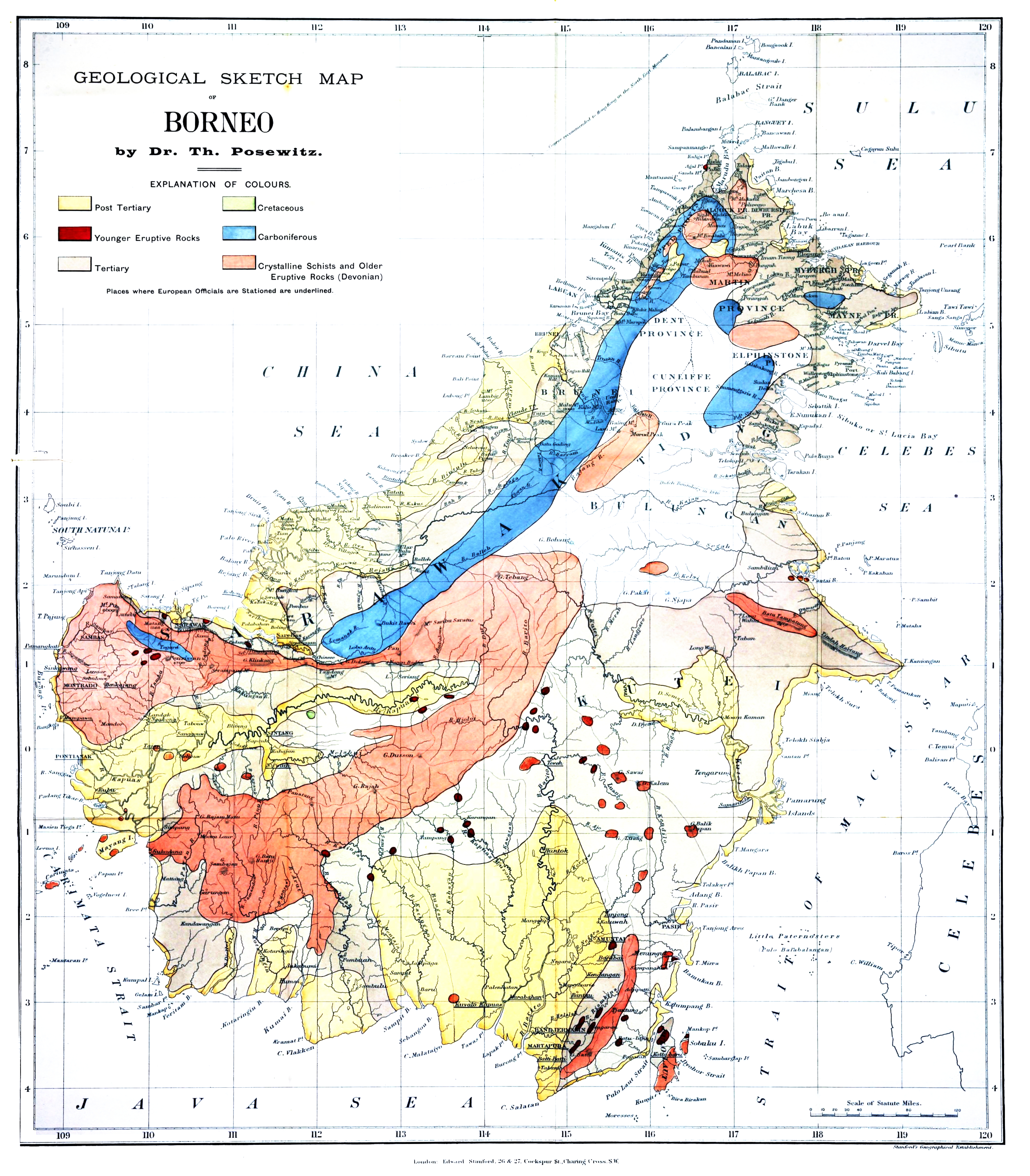
Geology map of Borneo by Posewitz

Posewitz was born in Szepes-Igló (or Zipser Neudorf or Spišská Nová Ves), now in Slovakia to a German speaking Saxon family, from a community known as Zipser Germans who had immigrated into Hungary. His father Samuel (1800–1871) was a physician married to Emeline Karafiáth (1815–1896) and they had two daughters and four sons including Theodor, the third son. Theodor studied at the local Lutheran school and became interested in nature thanks to visits into the Tatra Mountains where his father owned a Priessnitz-method hydropathy sanatorium. He went to study medicine at the University of Budapest, also taking courses in the natural sciences. He then moved to the University of Vienna and completed his medical exams in 1872. He then went to Leipzig and practiced medicine followed by studies in Vienna. He received a doctoral degree in chirurgy and obstetrics from the University of Würzburg in 1873 and became a full doctor in 1874. He then joined the Bergakademie, Freiberg to study geology for three years. He then worked as an unpaid researcher the Imperial Geological Institute in Vienna from 1876 under Franz Hauer. He studied a Pleistocene lake near his hometown and examined cobal and nickel ores in Dobsina. In 1871, his inheritance from his father's sanatorium and ironworks at Bauchendorf, allowed him to pursue travel and geology at his own expense. He joined the Dutch colonial service as a medical doctor and went to the East Indies in 1879. He landed in Jakarta (Batavia) on 6 November 1879 after 40 days of sailing from Port Said. He travelled around the region visiting Bogor, Ambarawa and other places. He also joined Louis Lóczy and Count Béla Széchenyi when then travelled through. He wrote about his travels in journals, describing also the social conditions. He married a local woman (given in a biography as "Mina Sinai" which means "Chinese Concubine") and they had a son Tivadar Henrik in 1882. In 1883 his wife died and he visited Flores. He travelled back to Europe in 1884 taking his son who was taken care of by the Posewitz family. He then married Adéle Papp (1867–1903), sister of geologist Károly Papp. After her death he married Margit Schulek (1874–1945). After returning he completed his master's degree in obstetrics from Budapest in 1885 and also a surgery degree to continue medical practice in Hungary. He however received a geologist position at the Hungarian Geological Institute in Budapest and he worked there for the next 29 years. He published a book on Borneo in 1889 and thanks to British interest in the region, it was translated into English by Frederick Henry Hatch in 1892. He was also a keen mountaineer and climbed in the alps and wrote a mountaineering guide.
