= Tomáš Nádašdi =

Slovak ice hockey player

- Born: May 14, 1980 (age 44); Spišská Nová Ves, Czechoslovakia
- Height: 6 ft 0 in (183 cm)
- Weight: 190 lb (86 kg; 13 st 8 lb)
- Position: Defence
- Shoots: Left
- Played for: HK Spišská Nová Ves; HC Košice; HK Dubnica; HK Trebišov; MsHK Žilina; HC Slovan Ústečtí Lvi; HC Kladno; HK Poprad; AaB Ishockey; HK Nitra; MHk 32 Liptovský Mikuláš; HK Indian Žiar nad Hronom; HK Považská Bystrica
- NHL draft: Undrafted
- Playing career: 1998–present

Tomáš Nádašdi (born May 14, 1980) is a Slovak former professional ice hockey defenceman.

== Career statistics ==
=== Regular season and playoffs ===
			Regular season					Playoffs
Season	Team	League	GP	G	A	Pts	PIM	GP	G	A	Pts	PIM
SVK totals			790	46	179	225	669	90	5	28	33	82
