= Bergebyløpet N70 =

Annual sled dog race in northern Norway

The Bergebyløpet N70 is an annual long-distance sled dog race held in the former municipality of Nord-Varanger, in Finnmark, Norway since 2003. The Bergebyløpet N70 is considered the world's northernmost long-distance sled dog race, based on the race's latitude. The race is also the only mainland sled dog race in the world that never goes south of the 70th parallel north.

== History ==
The Bergebyløpet N70 was established in 2003. Initially, the race covered 286 kilometres (178 mi) between the villages of Bergeby in Nesseby Municipality and Seidafjellet in Tana Municipality. The name Bergebyløpet translates to "The Bergeby Race." In 2015, the route was extended to 650 kilometres (400 mi), running from Masjok in the west to Krampenes in the east, making the race Norway’s second-longest after the Finnmarksløpet. The race has since been shortened, with the longest class racing 345 kilometres (214 mi).

== Race ==
The Bergebyløpet N70 starts in Rustefjelbma and races east to Vadsø, passing through the municipalities of Tana and Nesseby. The race distance has varied in distance and number of classes from year to year with the longest distance being 650 kilometres (400 mi). The course is set entirely north of the 70th parallel north, and according to the organizers, is the only long-distance sled dog race to do so. Currently the Bergebyløpet N70 is composed of four classes: an open class with up to 16 dogs racing a 345 kilometres (214 mi) course, an 8 dog team racing a 236 kilometres (147 mi) course, an 8 dog team racing a 116 kilometres (72 mi) course and a 6 dog junior team that also races 116 kilometres (72 mi). Teams who complete the Bergebyløpet N70 qualify to participate in the Finnmarksløpet.

The race differs from other Norwegian races due to the unmanned wilderness checkpoints in the course, where mushers receive no external assistance. Everything required for rest stops—including food for both the musher and the dogs, as well as supplies for dog care—must be packed on the sled from the start. Mushers sleep alongside their dogs at these wilderness checkpoints. Participants contend with extreme Arctic conditions, including temperatures as low as −30 °C (−22 °F), snowstorms, and the potential for encounters with wildlife such as moose. The terrain features technical trails over mountains and rivers, demanding high levels of skill and endurance from participants.

Nord-Varanger within Finnmark

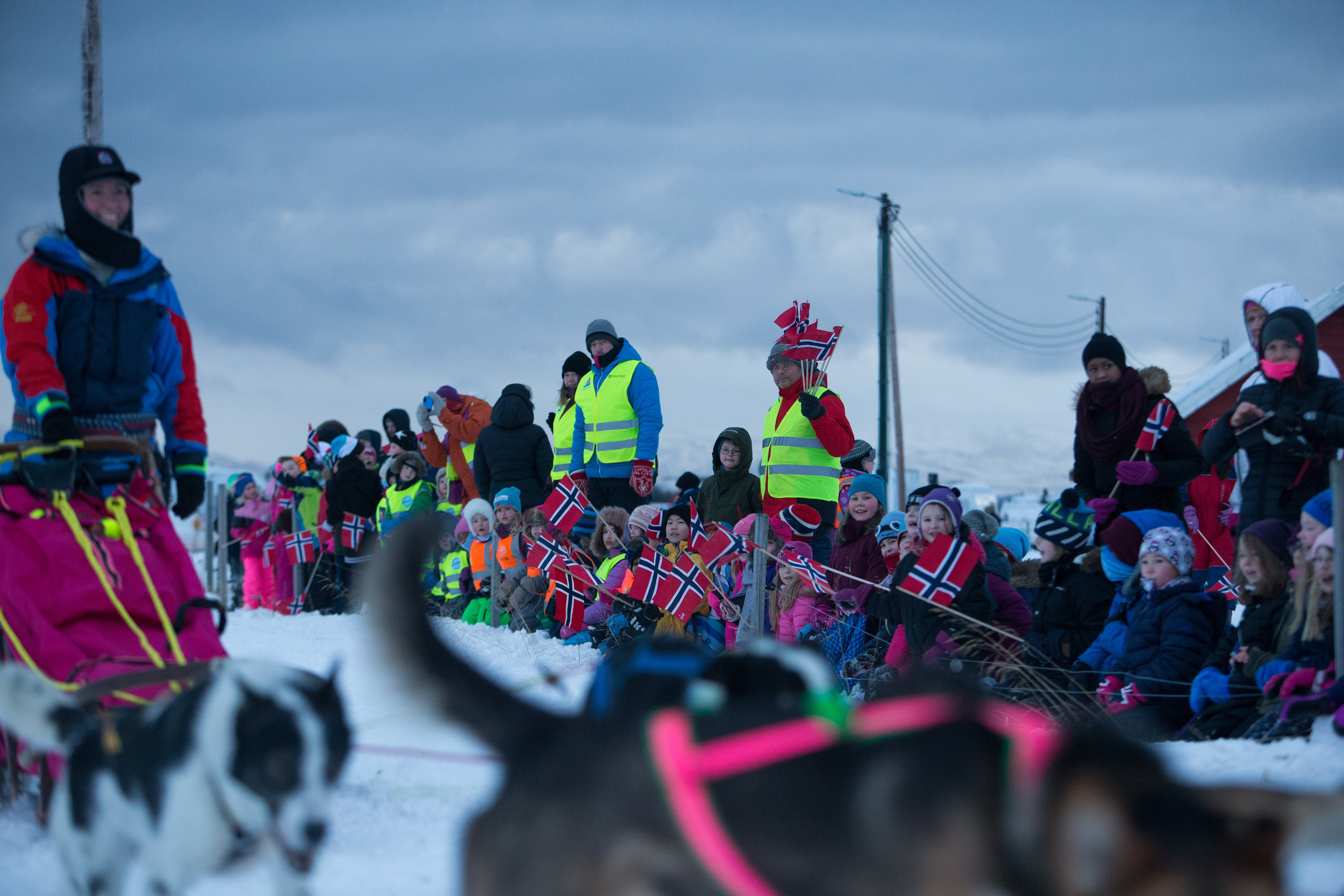
A musher in 2017
