= Sophus Tromholt =

Danish astrophysicist and photographer

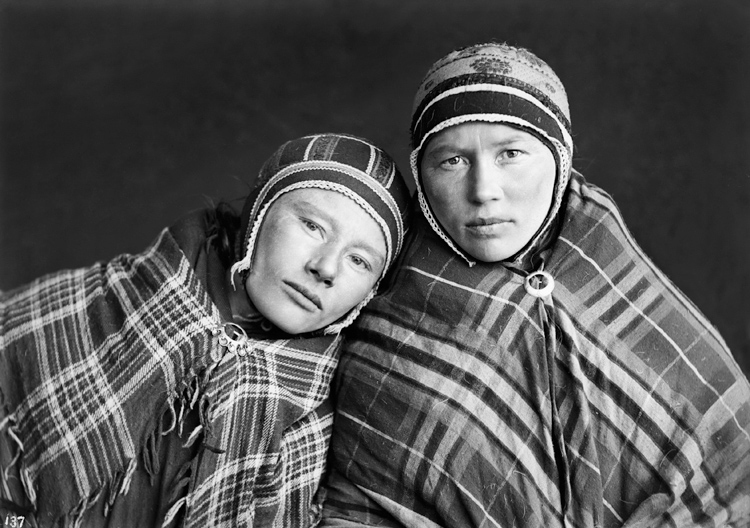
Portrait of two Sami girls in Kautokeino Municipality c. 1882/1883. Credit: Sophus Tromholt

Sophus Tromholt (2 June 1851 – 17 May 1896) was a Danish teacher, astrophysicist and an amateur photographer. He worked as a teacher at Tanks School in Bergen, Norway 1876-82. In 1882 he was granted a scholarship by the Danish and Norwegian states to study the northern lights (Aurora Borealis). During the first International Polar Year 1882/83, he established a scientific northern lights centre in Kautokeino. His Northern lights studies pioneered the modern Northern lights science. In 2013 UNESCO's Memory of the World International Register added the Sophus Tromholt Collection.

== Photo collection ==
During his stay in Northern Norway he photographed - apart from the scientific project - the landscape and the Sami people. His character portraits of the Sami are of high aesthetic quality artistically and as ethnographic photography. The photo collection is owned by the University of Bergen Library, Special collections, and consists of 231 glass negatives and 189 albumen prints in a portfolio: Sophus Tromholt: Billeder fra Lappernes Land. Tableaux du Pays des Lapons. 1883.

== Legacy ==
Fifteen of the photos of the Sophus Tromholt Collection are still part of a display at the University of Bergen's Stein Rokkan Building. (The display is at the street level of the building's facade, since 2013.)

== Biography ==
- Tromholt, Sophus: Under the rays of the Aurora Borealis. London 1885
- Larsen, Peter og Lien, Sigrid: Norsk Fotohistorie. Fra daguerrotypi til digitalisering. 2007. (Norwegian history of photography. From daguerreotype to digitising.)
- Moss, K.; Stauning, P. (2012). "Sophus Peter Tromholt: An outstanding pioneer in auroral research". History of Geo- and Space Sciences. 3 (1): 53–72. Bibcode:2012HGSS....3...53M. doi:10.5194/hgss-3-53-2012.
- Stauning, P. (2011). "Danish auroral science history". History of Geo- and Space Sciences. 2 (1): 1–28. Bibcode:2011HGSS....2....1S. doi:10.5194/hgss-2-1-2011.
