= Kautokeino Church =

- Kautokeino kirke (Norwegian); Guovdageainnu girku (Northern Sami)
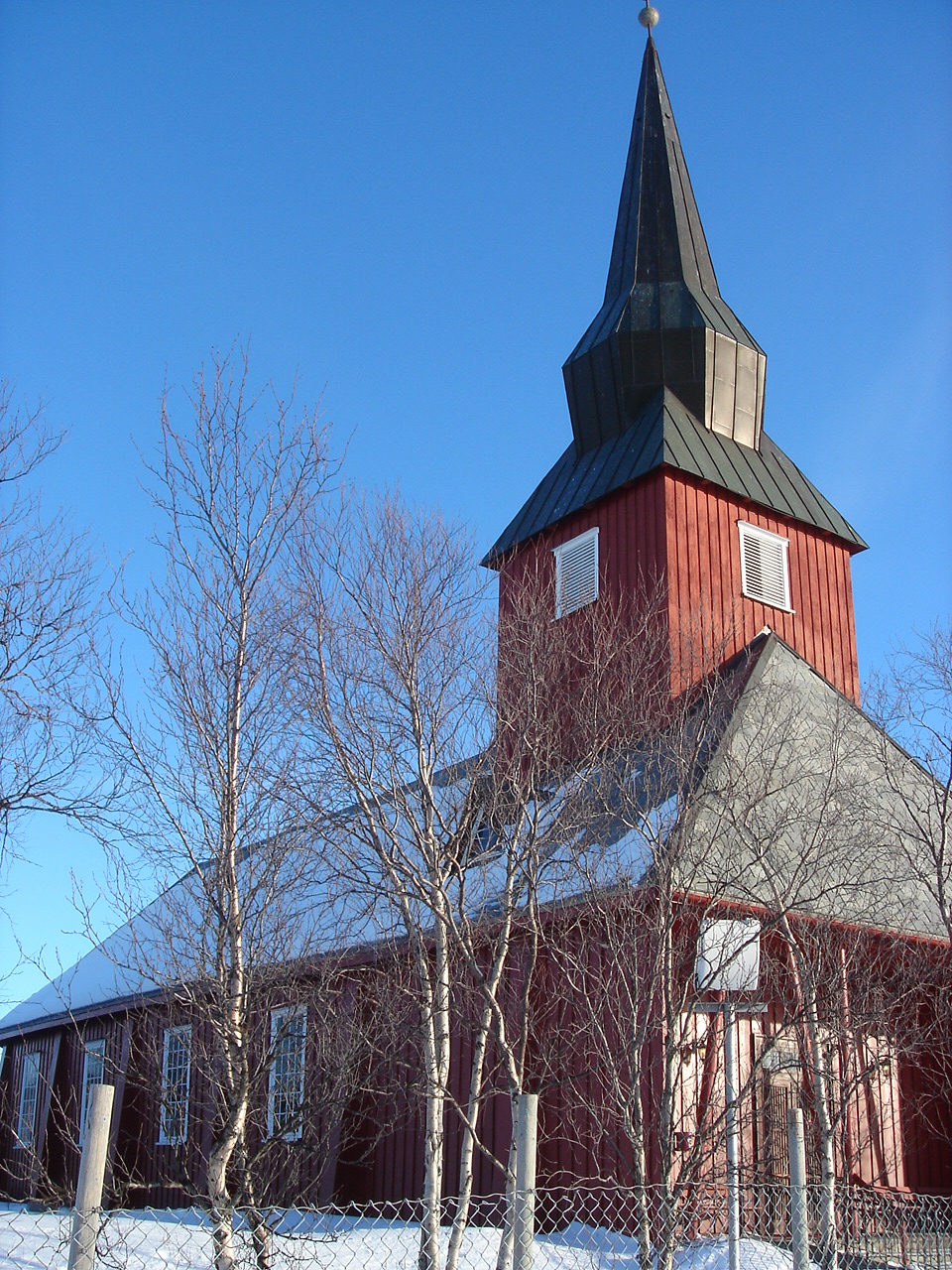
- View of the church
- Kautokeino Church
- 69.003287°N 23.048227°E
- Location: Kautokeino Municipality, Finnmark
- Country: Norway
- Denomination: Church of Norway
- Churchmanship: Evangelical Lutheran

History
- Status: Parish church
- Founded: 1702
- Consecrated: 1958

Architecture
- Functional status: Active
- Architect: Finn Bryn
- Architectural type: Long church
- Completed: 1958 (68 years ago)

Specifications
- Capacity: 272
- Materials: Wood

Administration
- Diocese: Nord-Hålogaland
- Deanery: Indre Finnmark prosti
- Parish: Kautokeino
- Norwegian Cultural Heritage Site
- Type: Church
- Status: Not protected
- ID: 84768

Kautokeino Church (Norwegian: Kautokeino kirke, Northern Sami: Guovdageainnu girku) is a parish church of the Church of Norway in Kautokeino Municipality in Finnmark county, Norway. It is located in the village of Kautokeino. It is the main church for the Kautokeino parish which is part of the Indre Finnmark prosti (deanery) in the Diocese of Nord-Hålogaland. The red, wooden church was built in a long church style in 1958 using plans drawn up by the architect Finn Bryn. The church seats about 272 people.

== History ==
The first church in Kautokeino was built in 1702 and it was one of the oldest buildings in all of Finnmark when the Germans burned it down near the end of World War II. After the war when funds were available, the church was rebuilt. It was completed in 1958.

== Media gallery ==
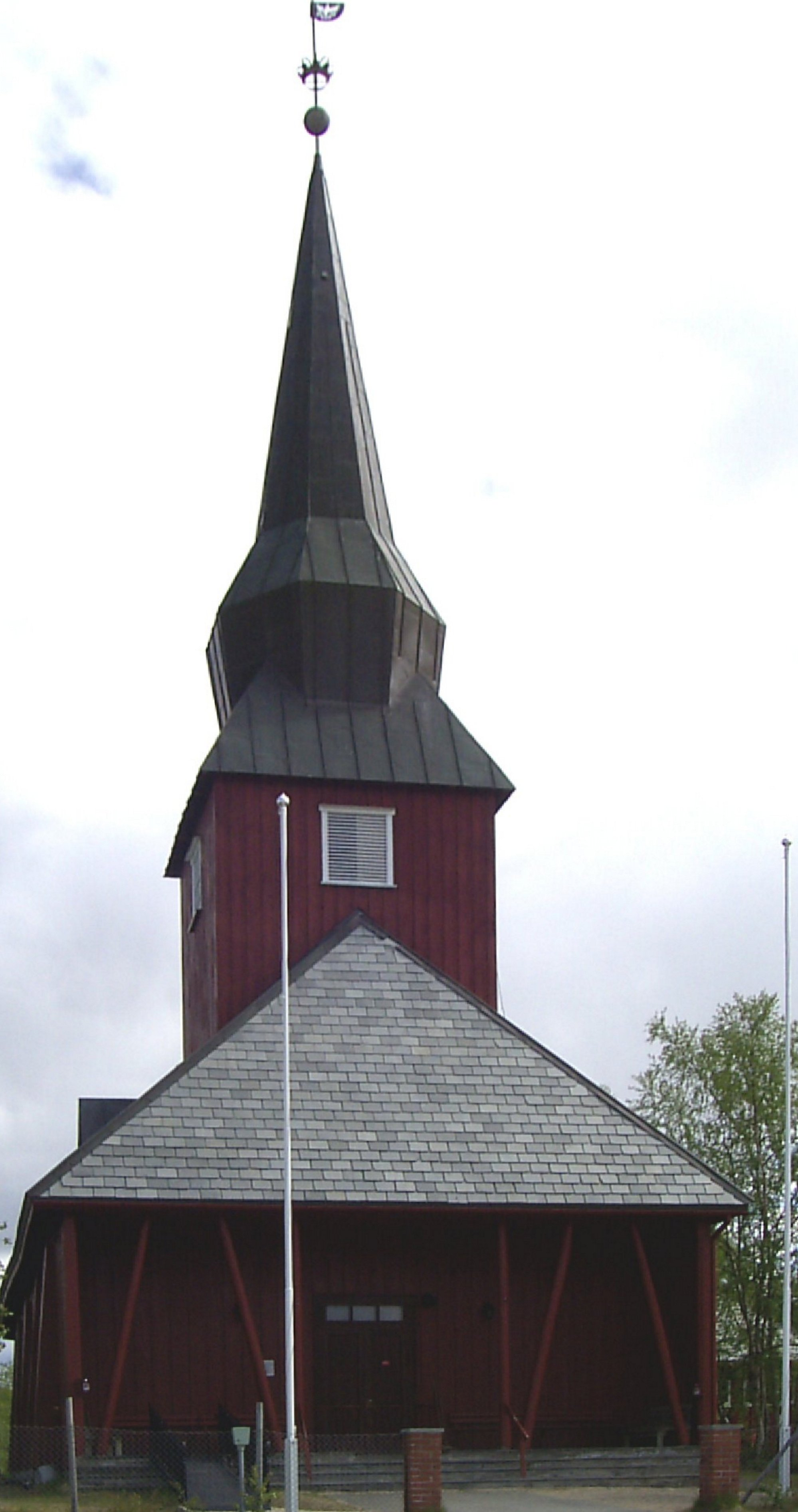

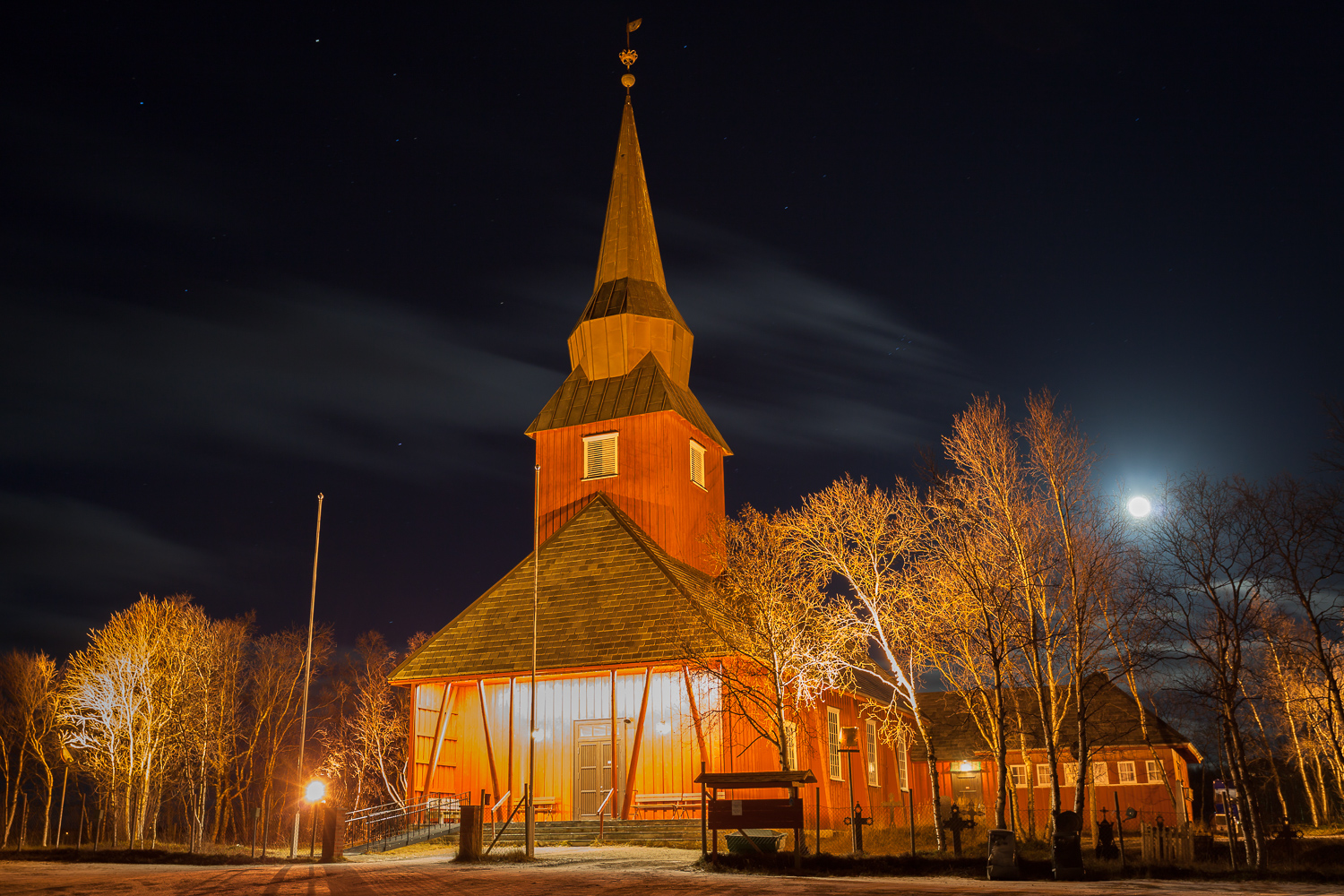

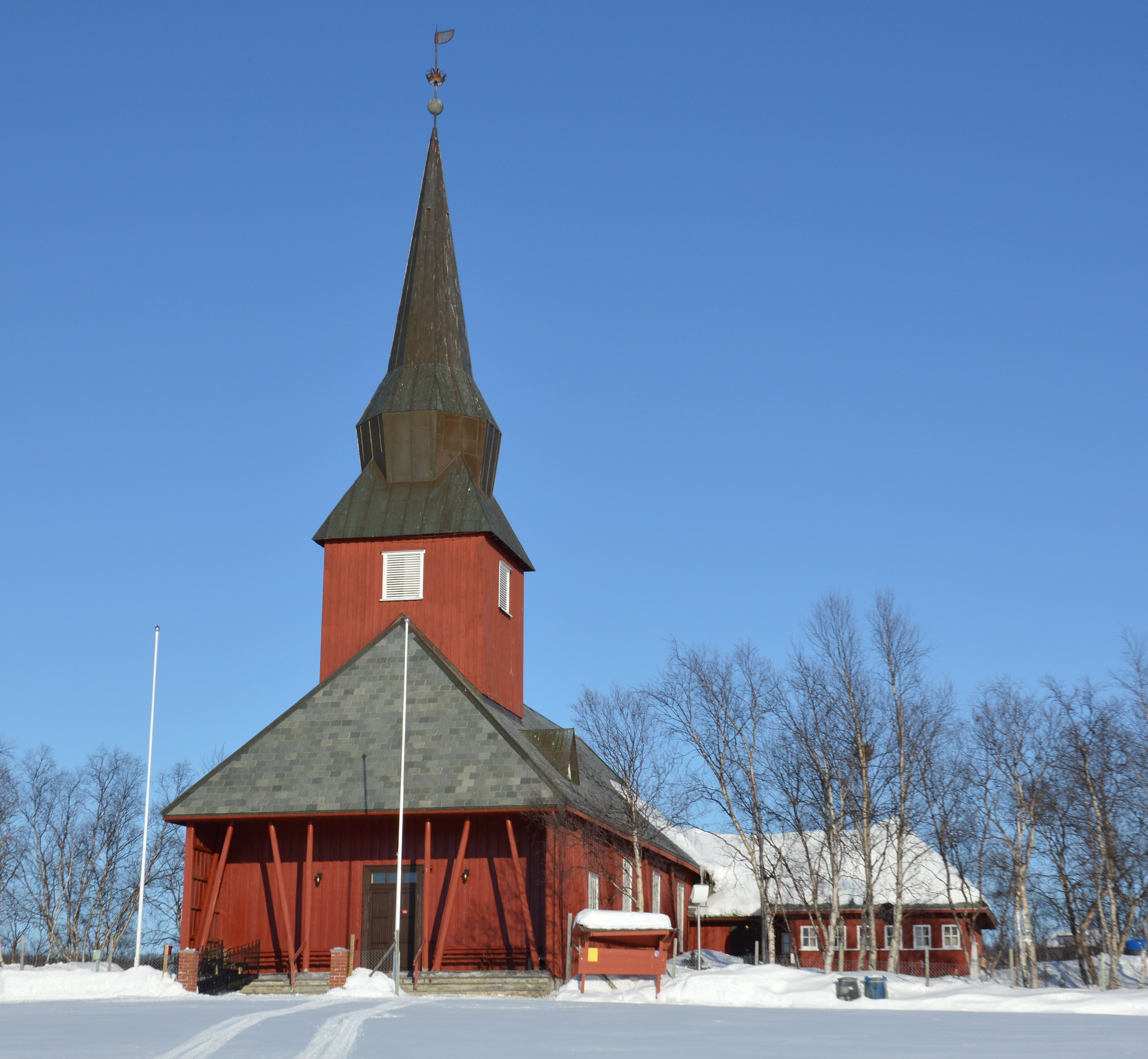

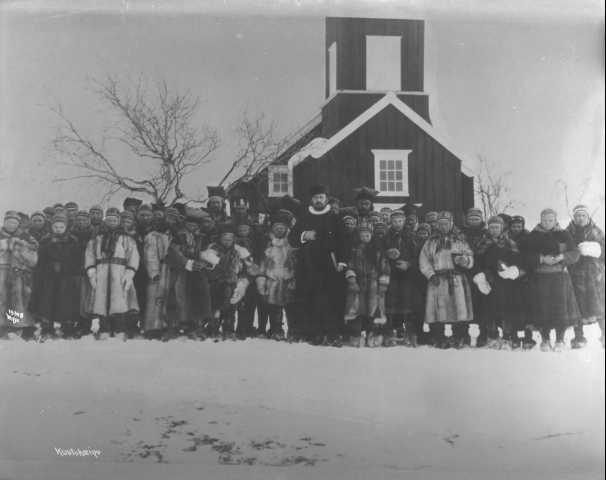
View of the old church building (1701-1944)

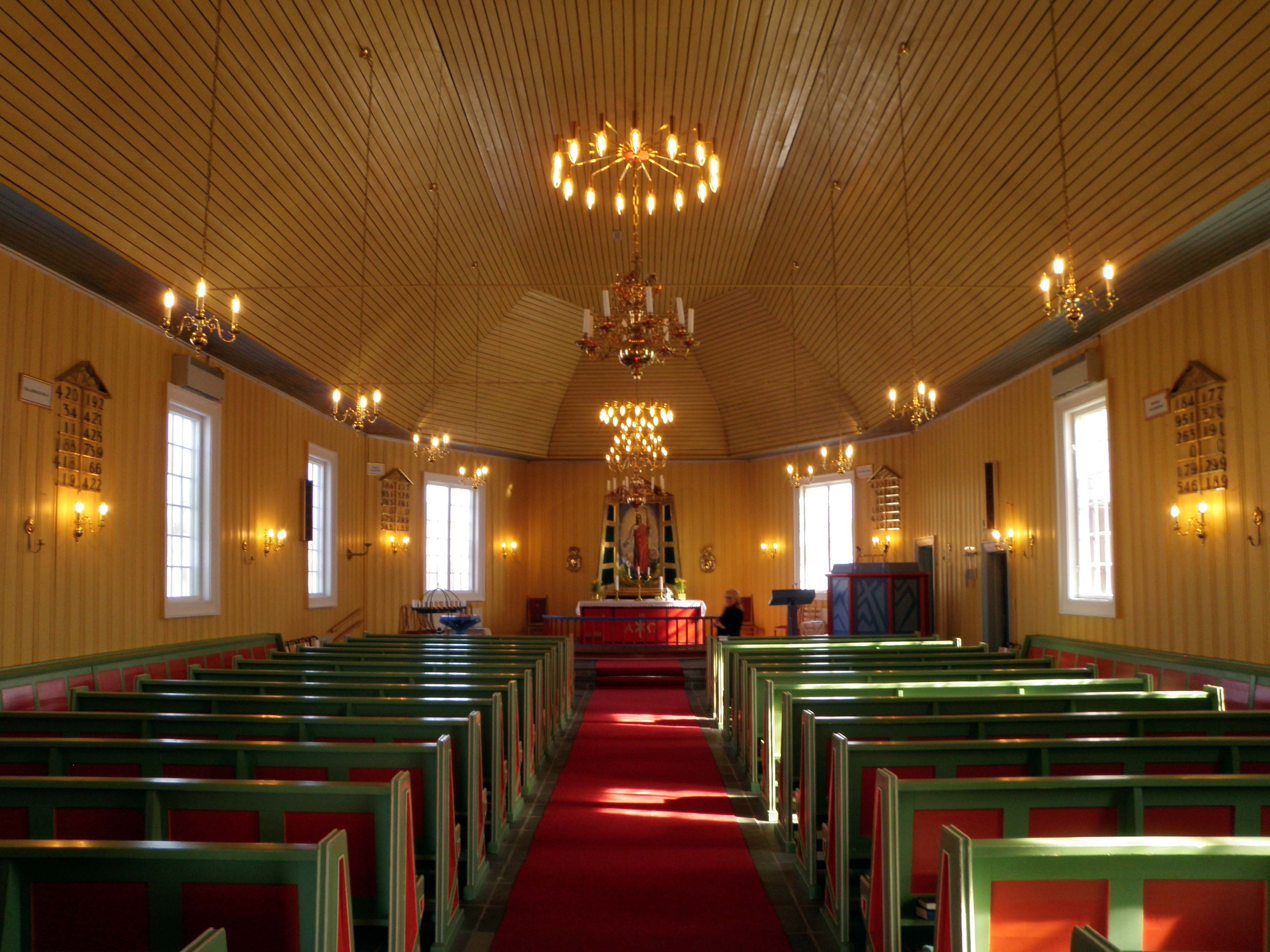
Inside Kautokeino Church, facing the altar.

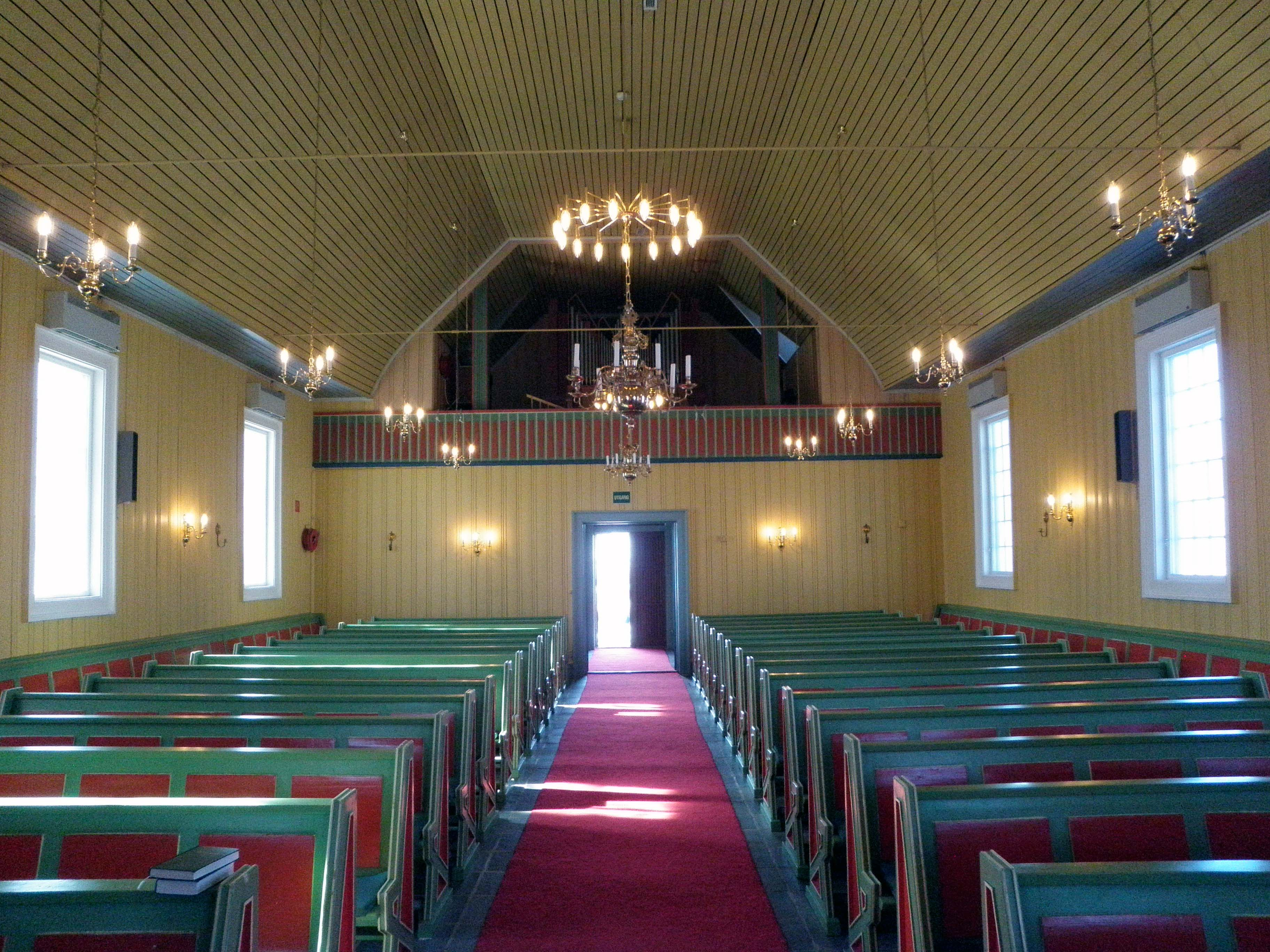
Inside Kautokeino Church, facing the church organ and the public entrance/exit.

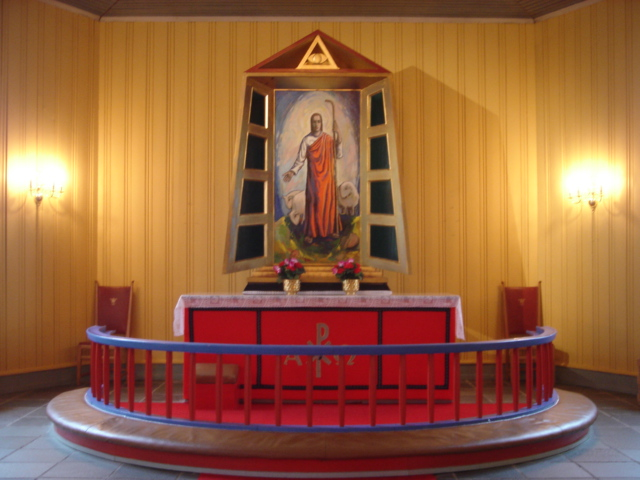
Altar

== See also ==
- List of churches in Nord-Hålogaland
