= Vranov nad Topľou =

- Municipality
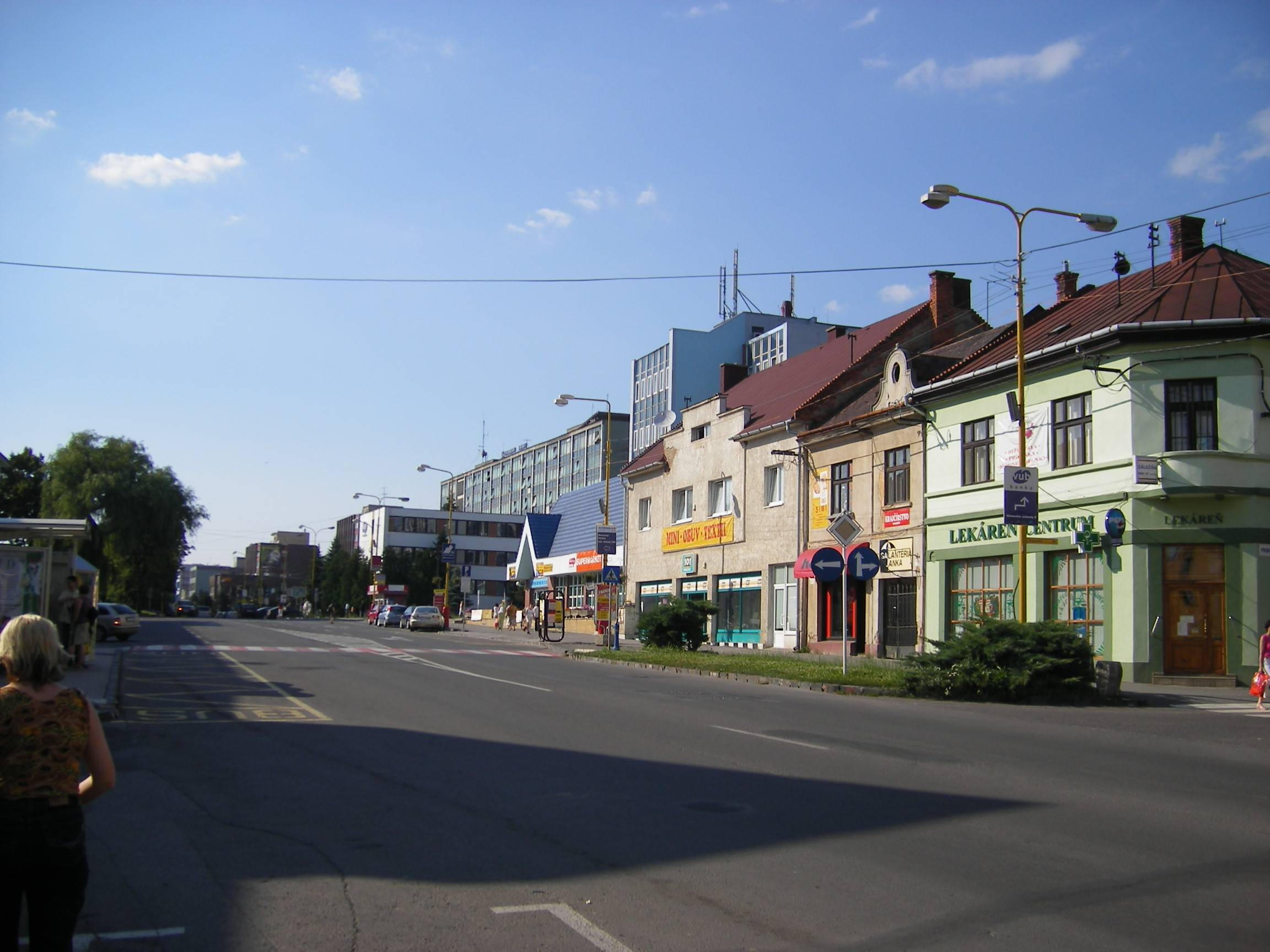

- Flag Coat of arms

- Location of Vranov nad Topľou in the Prešov Region Location of Vranov nad Topľou in Slovakia
- Coordinates: 48.88°N 21.67°E
- Country: Slovakia
- Region: Prešov Region
- District: Vranov nad Topľou District
- First mentioned: 1270

Government
  - Mayor: Ján Ragan

Area
  - Total: 34.35 km^{2} (13.26 sq mi)
- Elevation: 134 m (440 ft)

Population (2025)
  - Total: 20,007
- Time zone: UTC+1 (CET)
  - Summer (DST): UTC+2 (CEST)
- Postal code: 930 1
- Area code: +421 57
- Vehicle registration plate (until 2022): VT

Vranov nad Topľou (Slovak before 1927 and from 1944–1969: Vranov; German: Frö(h)nel / Vronau an der Töpl (rare); Hungarian: Varannó; Rusyn: Воронів над Топлёв) is a town of approximately 20,000 inhabitants in eastern Slovakia, situated near Košice and Prešov, and between the Topľa River and the Ondava River.

The city is divided into three parts: Vranov nad Topľou proper, Čemerné and Lomnica.

== Geography ==
The municipality lies at an altitude of 134 metres (440 ft) and covers an area of 34.35 km^{2} (13.26 sq mi) (2025).

== Etymology ==
The name is derived from a Slovak word vrana (crow) with a possessive suffix -ov. In Latin medieval record, the settlement is often called Varanno (the Hungarized form), but also Wrano, Varanow or rarely Varanovia (the Latinized form).

== Location ==
Vranov nad Toplou occupies the northwest bulge of the Eastern Slovak Lowland (Východoslovenská nížina) in the upper part of the region called Zemplín between the rivers Topľa and Ondava.

== History ==
The earliest evidences of the human presence in the area of today's Vranov dates back to Paleolithic Era. Several artefacts from the Roman-Migration Period were unearth in the center of town. Extensive Slavic settlement (7th-10th century) existed in Lomnica (nowadays a part of Vranov), Slavic settlements are known also from Čemerné and other localities.

The first written mention about Vranov dates back to 1332–1337, but mentions about localities that are nowadays parts of town are older (1229, 1270, 1282). The medieval settlement of Vranov nad Topľou was part of the castle estate Čičava Castle (Csisva) which was built in 1310. Because of the advantageous geographical position of the town situated on the important trading path leading from Eperjes/Prešov, Vranov nad Topľou became an economic and social centre for the territory in the basin of two rivers, the Ondava and the Topľa. Besides the local trade, handicraft production has been developed here, too.

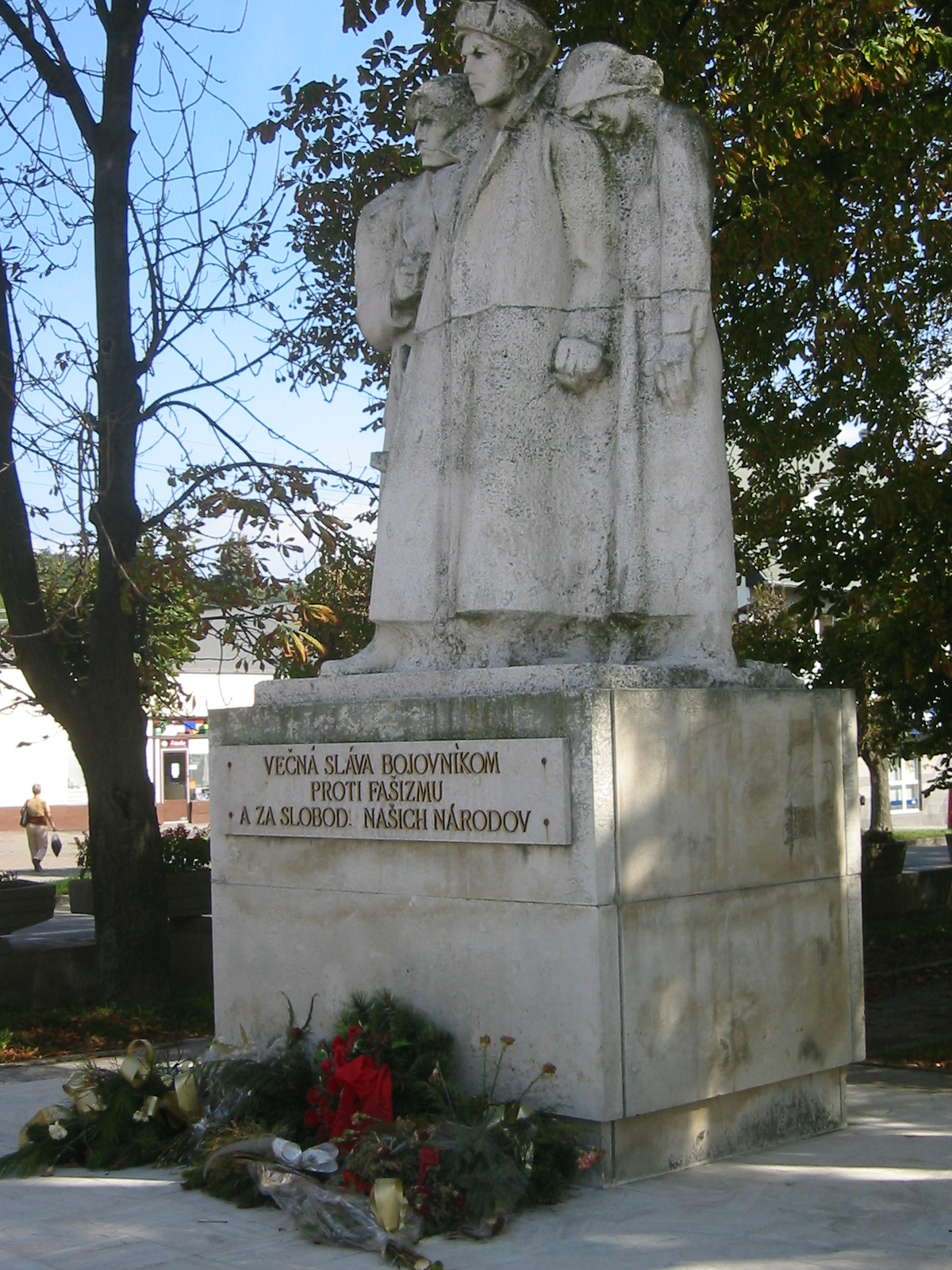
Anti-fascist memorial

Vranov was granted town status probably before 1363 (in this year it was firstly mentioned as "civitas"). The heads of the municipal government founded were the mayor and the counselors. The town was given more municipal privileges (toll right, right to store the goods, right to hold an annual market) by King Matthias Corvinus in 1461, and the town was given the right to make out written documents with a municipal seal. The original seal from the 15th century displayed a cancer, later it was replaced by a patron of the local church (King Saint Stephen). The heraldic coat-of-arms in its present form has been used since 1622. The first guilds were founded here in the 16th century. The guild of Vranov shoemakers is one of the oldest guilds in the whole Zemplín county. A grammar school was founded in the town in the 16th century.

When a large part of Hungary was conquered by the Turks in 1526, Vranov was mostly unaffected as the northern regions of Hungary were not conquered by the Turks and this allowed the city to prosper under the Zápolya house which ruled the area and the Thököly's in the late 17th century.

In the second half of the 19th century, Vranov nad Topľou became the centre of a region of 44 villages. At the end of the century there was mass emigration. In 1903, Vranov got access to the railroad; electric lighting and the telephone were introduced in 1906.

After the formation of Czechoslovakia, the Hungarian name Varannó was changed to Vranov nad Topľou and it remained a small agrarian and craft town. During the Second World War, some partisan groups were formed in the region, and the town became the centre of an anti-fascist revolt. In 1942 most of the remaining Hungarians, those who would not declare that they were ethnic Slovaks, were forcibly deported from Vranov and ethnic Slovaks were moved into the area. The period after 1945 was a time of industrial development, building of housing estates and reconstruction of the town centre.

== Population ==
Historical population
Year	Pop.	±%
1970	11,650	—
1980	16,966	+45.6%
1991	21,330	+25.7%
2001	22,985	+7.8%
2011	23,250	+1.2%
2021	21,248	−8.6%
Source: Censuses

Population statistic (10 years)
Year	1995	2005	2015	2025
Count	24,079	23,109	22,762	20,007
Difference		−4.02%	−1.50%	−12.10%

Population statistic
Year	2024	2025
Count	20,262	20,007
Difference		−1.25%

It has a population of 20,007 people (31 December 2025).

=== Ethnicity ===
Census 2021 (1+ %)
Ethnicity	Number	Fraction
Slovak	19,307	90.86%
Not found out	1688	7.94%
Romani	703	3.3%
Rusyn	271	1.27%
Total	21,248	

In year 2021 was 21,248 people by ethnicity 19,307 as Slovak, 1688 as Not found out, 703 as Romani, 271 as Rusyn, 118 as Czech, 51 as Other, 44 as Ukrainian, 36 as Hungarian, 22 as Russian, 19 as Vietnamese, 16 as Polish, 10 as Albanian, 9 as Canadian, 9 as English, 7 as German, 4 as Irish, 3 as Italian, 3 as Austrian, 2 as Romanian, 2 as Greek, 1 as Jewish, 1 as Serbian, 1 as Moravian, 1 as French and 1 as Bulgarian.

Note on population: The difference values of population numbers in the table "Population statistic" and in the sections "Ethnicity" & "Religion" is caused by the use of various statistical methods.

=== Religion ===
Census 2021 (1+ %)
Religion	Number	Fraction
Roman Catholic Church	11,167	52.56%
Greek Catholic Church	3935	18.52%
None	2150	10.12%
Not found out	1971	9.28%
Evangelical Church	1477	6.95%
Total	21,248	

In year 2021 was 21,248 people by religion 11,167 from Roman Catholic Church, 3935 from Greek Catholic Church, 2150 from None, 1971 from Not found out, 1477 from Evangelical Church, 110 from Eastern Orthodox Church, 91 from Jehovah's Witnesses, 71 from Apostolic Church, 49 from Ad hoc movements, 43 from Christian Congregations in Slovakia, 42 from Calvinist Church, 34 from Other, 24 from Church of the Brethren, 22 from Other and not ascertained christian church, 15 from Islam, 11 from Baptists Church, 10 from Buddhism, 7 from Paganism and natural spirituality, 6 from United Methodist Church, 5 from Jewish community, 5 from Seventh-day Adventist Church, 1 from Old Catholic Church, 1 from Hinduism and 1 from Czechoslovak Hussite Church.

== Noteworthy objects ==
The town features a Gothic church from the 15th century (rebuilt 1578 and again 1718), a baroque monastery from 1718, a neo-Gothic Evangelic Lutheran church of 1930-1935 and a Reformed church from the early 20th century. A synagogue of 1923 and a classicist manor house (a castle built in the 18th century on the place of a castle built in the Middle Ages) were demolished in the 1980s. Vranov was also a major milling centre during the 16th century.

The town is the starting point for trips to the Veľká Domaša water reservoir.

The town is an economic center of the surroundings. In the late 20th century it housed chemical (Bukóza works), clothing (Slovenka), building materials and food industries.

== Sports ==
=== MFK Vranov nad Topľou ===
The city has one football club, MFK Vranov nad Topľou, which competes in the Slovak Third League (East), the third-tier of Slovak football.

== Notable people ==
- Aurel Illéš
- Ján Figeľ, the first European Commissioner for Slovakia, former leader of the Christian Democratic Movement party.
- Vladimír Kobielsky, actor
- Vojtech Christov, football referee
- Martin Šviderský, football player
- Matus Tomko, opera singer
- Patrik Vasiľ, football player

== Twin towns — sister cities ==
Vranov nad Topľou is twinned with:

- Bystřice nad Pernštejnem, Czech Republic
- Dynów, Poland
- Sambir, Ukraine
- Vynohradiv, Ukraine
- Mád, Hungary
