= Matúš Tomko =

Slovak opera singer (born 1978)

- Born: 4 February 1978 (age 48)
- Origin: Vranov nad Topľou, Czechoslovakia
- Genres: Opera, Classical
- Instruments: Singing (bass)
- Years active: 1998–present (singer)

Matúš Tomko (born 4 February 1978) is a Slovak opera singer (bass). He studied opera singing at the Church Conservatory in Bratislava, Slovakia (1998–2004) with František Malatinec. Since 2004, he has been a soloist at the State Theatre Košice where he made his debut as the Speaker of the Temple in Mozart's Magic Flute, directed by Miloslav Oswald and Igor Dohovič. In 2005 he won the third place at the 40th Antonin Dvořák International Vocal Competition in Karlovy Vary, Czech Republic.

As a principal soloist at the State Theatre Košice, he has sung many roles, including Brander in Faust, Mícha in The Bartered Bride, Samuel Ribbing in Un Ballo in Maschera the Marchese d'Obigny in La Traviata, and Masetto in Don Giovanni.

In 2009, he performed the role of Jan in the worldwide premiere of the original Slovak opera, Šavol, by Slovak composer Víťazoslav Kubička and librettist Teodor Križka. The opera was performed by the Philharmonic Orchestra of Košice under the musical direction of Adrian Kokos in Košice, Kežmarok, Žilina and Nitra.

Matúš Tomko often performs at charity concerts. He was invited by a non-profit organisation - Centrum Slniecko (Little Sun Centre) to sing at the charity concert on the World day of prevention of cruelty to children at the Nitra Synagogue in November 2010.

On 26 November 2012 Matúš Tomko was invited by the Church Conservatory of Music in Bratislava to take part in a concert dedicated to the 100th anniversary of birth of a great Slovak opera singer Anna Hrusovska, who was an excellent interpreter of the works of W. A. Mozart. Matúš Tomko performed the arias of W.A. Mozart along with the other ex-students from the Church Conservatory such as Pavol Brslik, Martina Masarykova, Lenka Kotrbova and a chamber orchestra ZOE under the leadership of Alan Vizvary.
