= Spišská Nová Ves =

Town in Slovakia

- Town
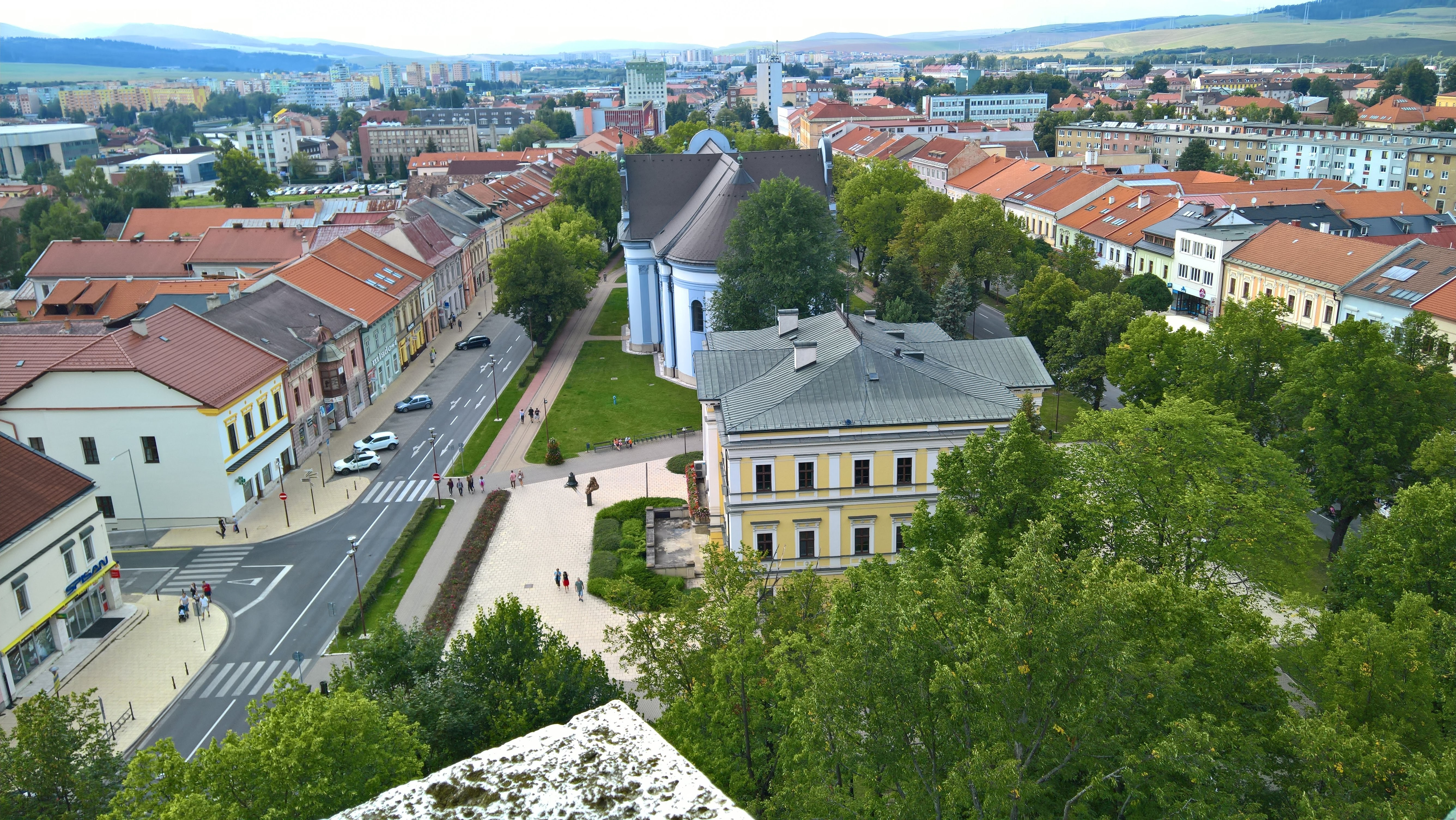
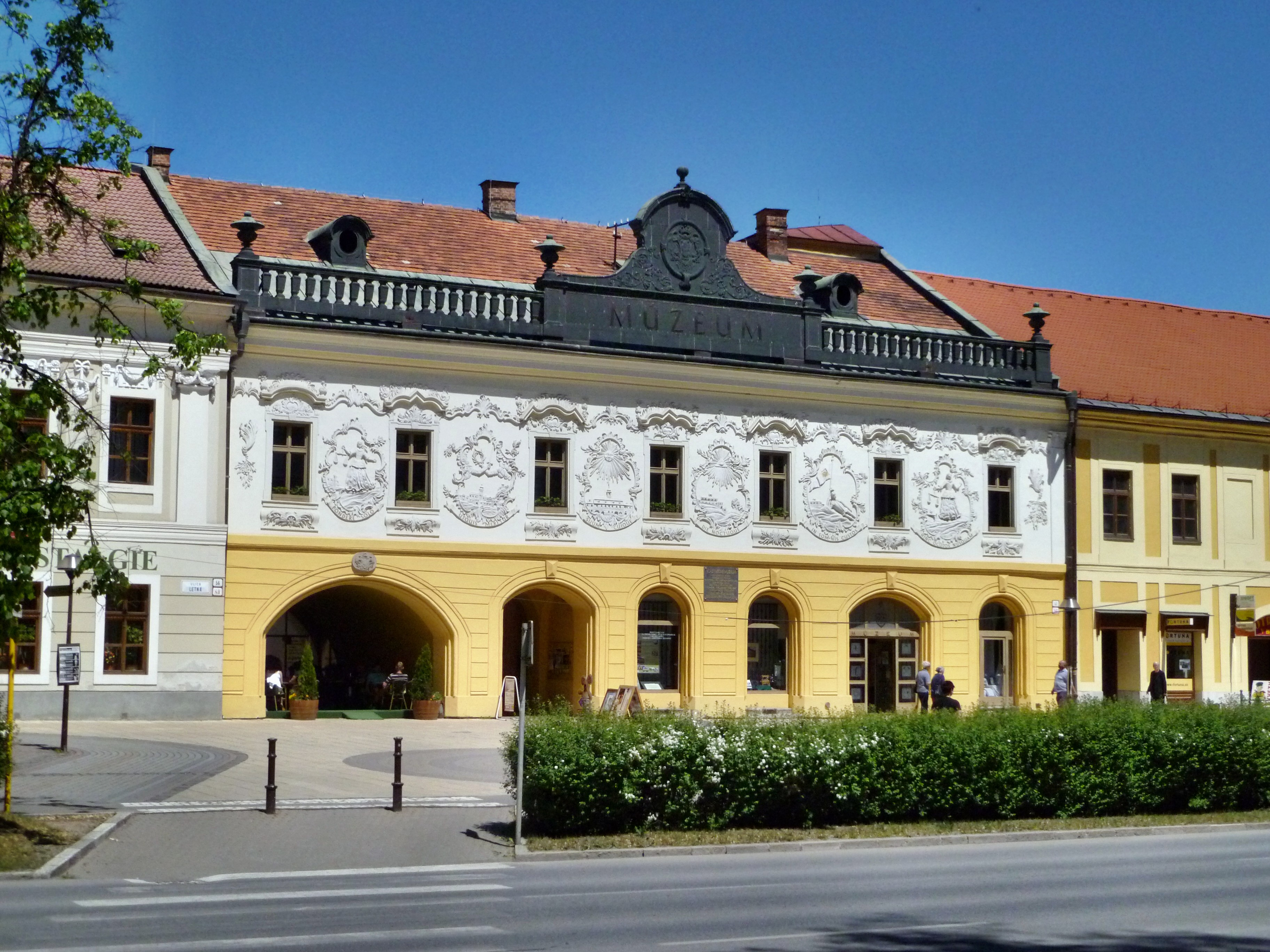
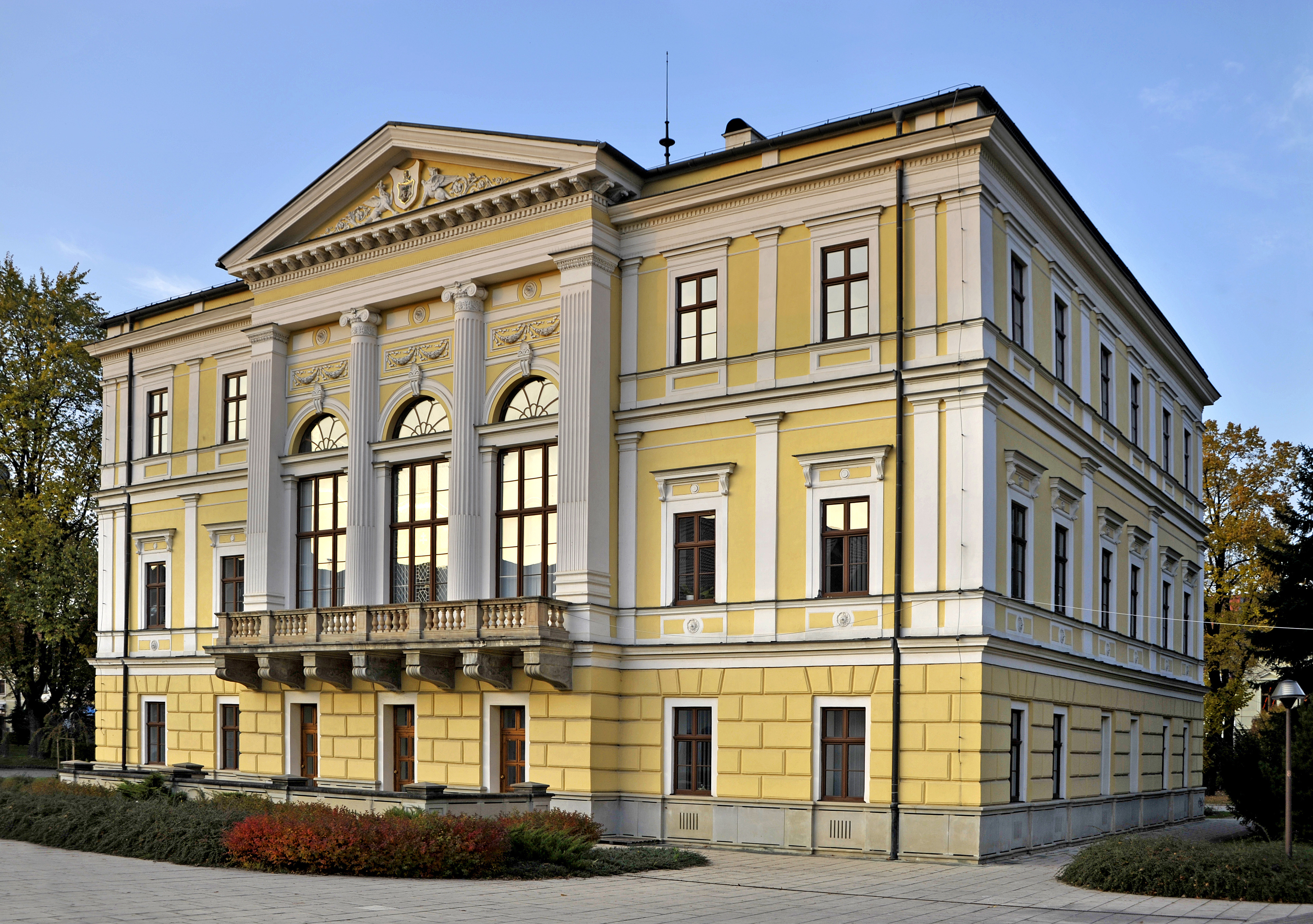
- From the top, Aerial view of Radničné Square, Spiš Museum, Spišská Nová Ves Town Hall

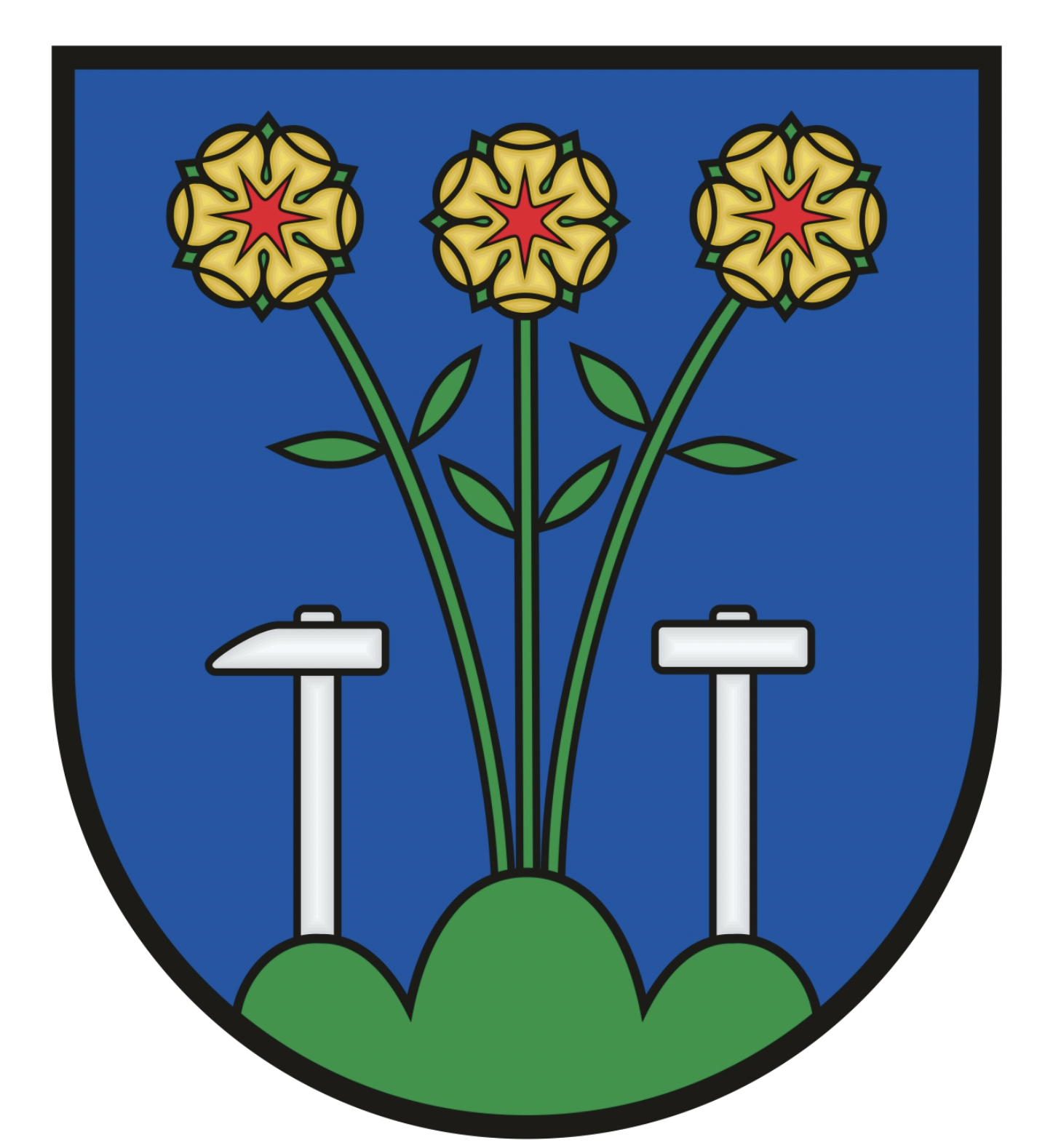
- Flag Coat of arms

- Location of Spišská Nová Ves in the Košice Region Location of Spišská Nová Ves in Slovakia
- Coordinates: 48°56′38″N 20°34′03″E
- Country: Slovakia
- Region: Košice Region
- District: Spišská Nová Ves District
- First mentioned: 1268

Government
  - Mayor: Dávid Demečko (HLAS-SD)

Area
  - Total: 66.67 km^{2} (25.74 sq mi)
- (2022)
- Elevation: 506 m (1,660 ft)

Population (2025)
  - Total: 34,023
- Time zone: UTC+1 (CET)
  - Summer (DST): UTC+2 (CEST)
- Postal code: 052 01
- Area code: +421 53
- Vehicle registration plate (until 2022): SN
- Website: www.spisskanovaves.eu

Spišská Nová Ves (Slovak pronunciation: [spiʃskaː nɔvaː ves]; Hungarian: Igló; German: (Zipser) Neu(en)dorf) is a town in the Košice Region of Slovakia. The town is located southeast of the High Tatras in the Spiš region, and lies on both banks of the Hornád River. It is the biggest town of the Spišská Nová Ves District.

Tourist attractions nearby include the medieval town of Levoča, Spiš Castle, and the Slovak Paradise National Park. A biennial music festival, Divertimento musicale, is held here, attracting amateur music ensembles from all over Slovakia.

== Geography ==
The municipality lies at an altitude of 506 metres (1,660 ft) and covers an area of 66.67 km^{2} (25.74 sq mi) (2025).

== Names and etymology ==
The town originated by merging an older Slavic settlement Iglov and a more recent settlement of German colonists (Latin: Villa Nova, German: Neudorf, Slovak: Nová Ves - literally New Village).

Iglov is probably derived from a Slavic word igla (Proto-Slavic igъla, jьgъla, modern Slovak ihla) - a needle. Šimon Ondruš explains the name from Slavic jug - the south, a light, Juglava/Iglava/Iglov - a light place, a glade. The name was adopted by the Hungarians as Igló.

== History ==
Historical affiliations

Kingdom of Hungary 1268–1412
Kingdom of Poland 1412–1569
Polish–Lithuanian Commonwealth 1569–1769
(Austrian Empire) Kingdom of Hungary 1769–1867
Austria-Hungary 1867–1918
Czechoslovakia 1918–1939
Slovak Republic 1939–1945
Czechoslovakia 1945–1990
Czech and Slovak Federative Republic 1990–1992
Slovak Republic 1993–present

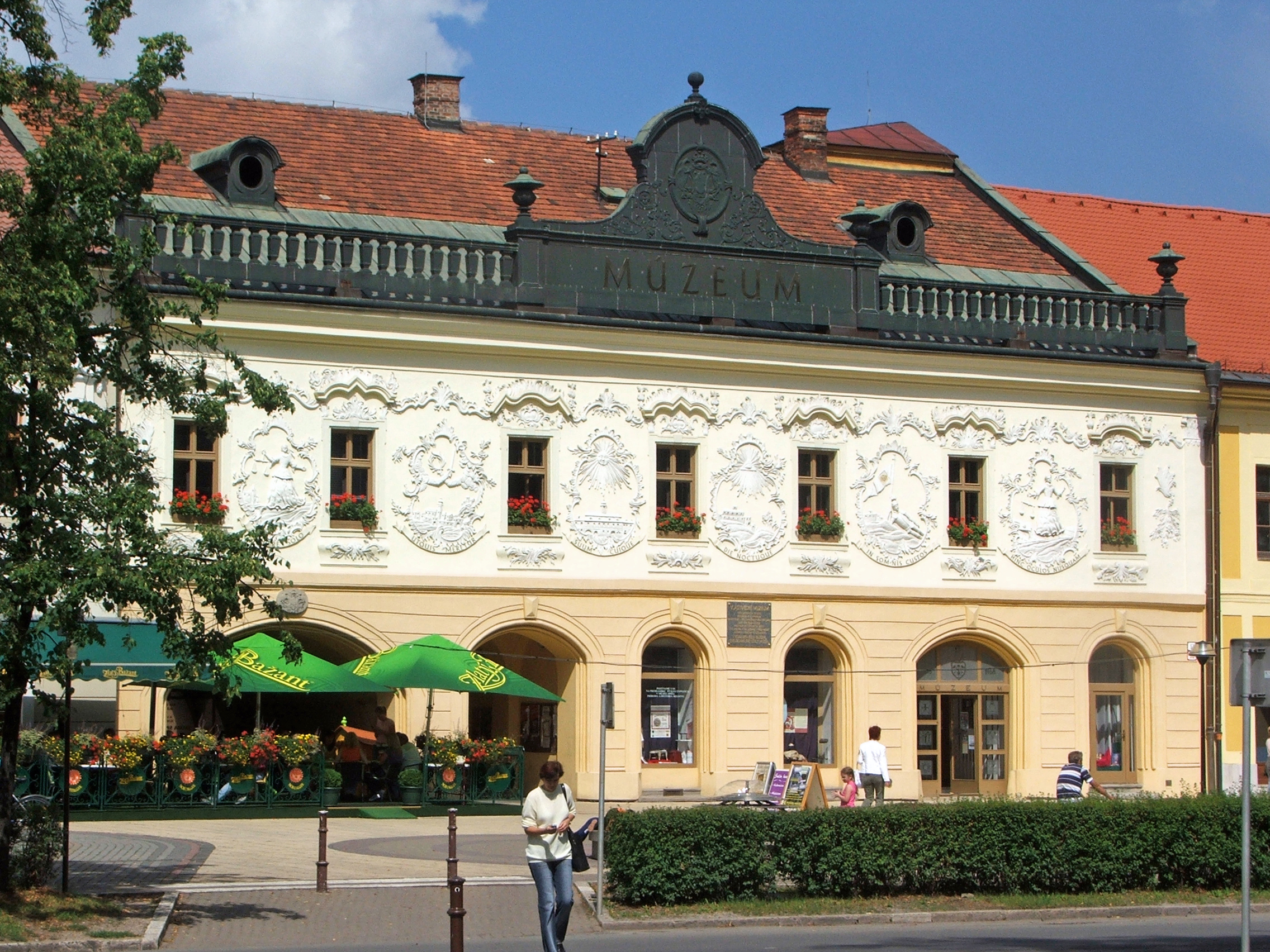
Spiš Museum

Settlement in the town's region dates to the Neolithic age. There is evidence of a prosperous society that was familiar with copper mining and processing. When the Celts arrived, they brought with them advanced iron technology. Celtic coins have been found in the region. During the 6th century, the period known as the Great Migration, Slavic tribes appeared in the Spiš region. During the 10th century, the structure of their settlements stabilized, and important communication roads were established. It became part of the Principality, then Kingdom of Hungary. In the 13th century, Saxon (Carpathian German) miners founded a town next to an earlier Slavic settlement. The settlement suffered greatly from the invading Tatars in the 13th century. After the Tatar invasion, King Béla IV invited German colonists from the town of Jihlava and settled them here. They named the new town Iglau after their place of origin, and it first appeared in written sources as "Villa Nova" or "Neudorf", covering the area of the present town.

The town received market rights in the 14th century and grew to become an important market town. It became an official mining town in 1380 and had the largest street market in the Kingdom of Hungary. Copper mining was an important activity. The metal was processed in furnaces, which were fuelled with wood from the surrounding forests. A Gothic bell foundry was established by Konrád Gaal, who made a large hanging bell for Louis I of Hungary, and was consequently knighted in 1357. The bells made by Konrád Gaal are still hanging and form an important legacy of European Gothic metal foundry.

In 1412, Spišská Nová Ves, along with several other Spiš towns, was pawned as loan security by the Hungarian king Sigmund to the Polish king Vladislaus II Jagiełło. This pledge lasted for 360 years.

Blacksmiths were the first local craftsmen to unite into a guild, which was given royal privileges in 1436. They smelted their own ore, or built water-driven forges along the rivers Hornád and Dubnica. Coppersmiths made kettles of a specifically defined weight because kettles were widely used as a means of payment. There were charcoal burners and even resin pickers who collected resin from trees to produce tar for greasing wagons. There were wheelwrights, coopers, weavers, joiners, gunsmiths, basketmakers, bakers, furriers, tanners, cooks and millers, hunters, fishermen and beekeepers.

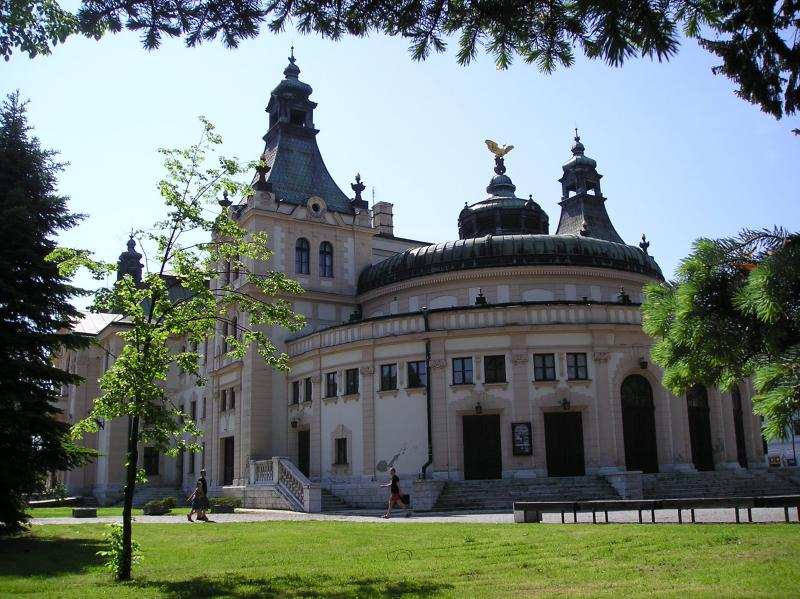
Reduta Theatre

There were many Germans living in Spiš, and through their influence, the town became Lutheran in the 1540s. Between 1569 and 1674, Catholic services were forbidden in the pawned towns. There were many contacts with Poland, and this helped to stimulate the national consciousness of the Slovak people. The pawned towns were returned to the Kingdom of Hungary in 1772. In 1778, Spišská Nová Ves became the capital of the "Province of 16 Spiš towns".

In the 19th century, the manufacture of stoneware was important in the town. The products all bore a trademark formed from the word "Iglo" with two crossed miners' hammers. Other industrial activities included oil production and a weaving plant, as well as agricultural machines. The railway provided an important means of communication from 1870. A power station was built in 1894, and living conditions improved. In July 1929, the Podtatranská výstava (Sub-Tatras Exhibition) showed results of economic growth and made the town famous in Slovakia. During World War II, Spišská Nova Ves was taken by Soviet troops of the 18th Army on 27 January 1945.

== Spišská Nová Ves today ==
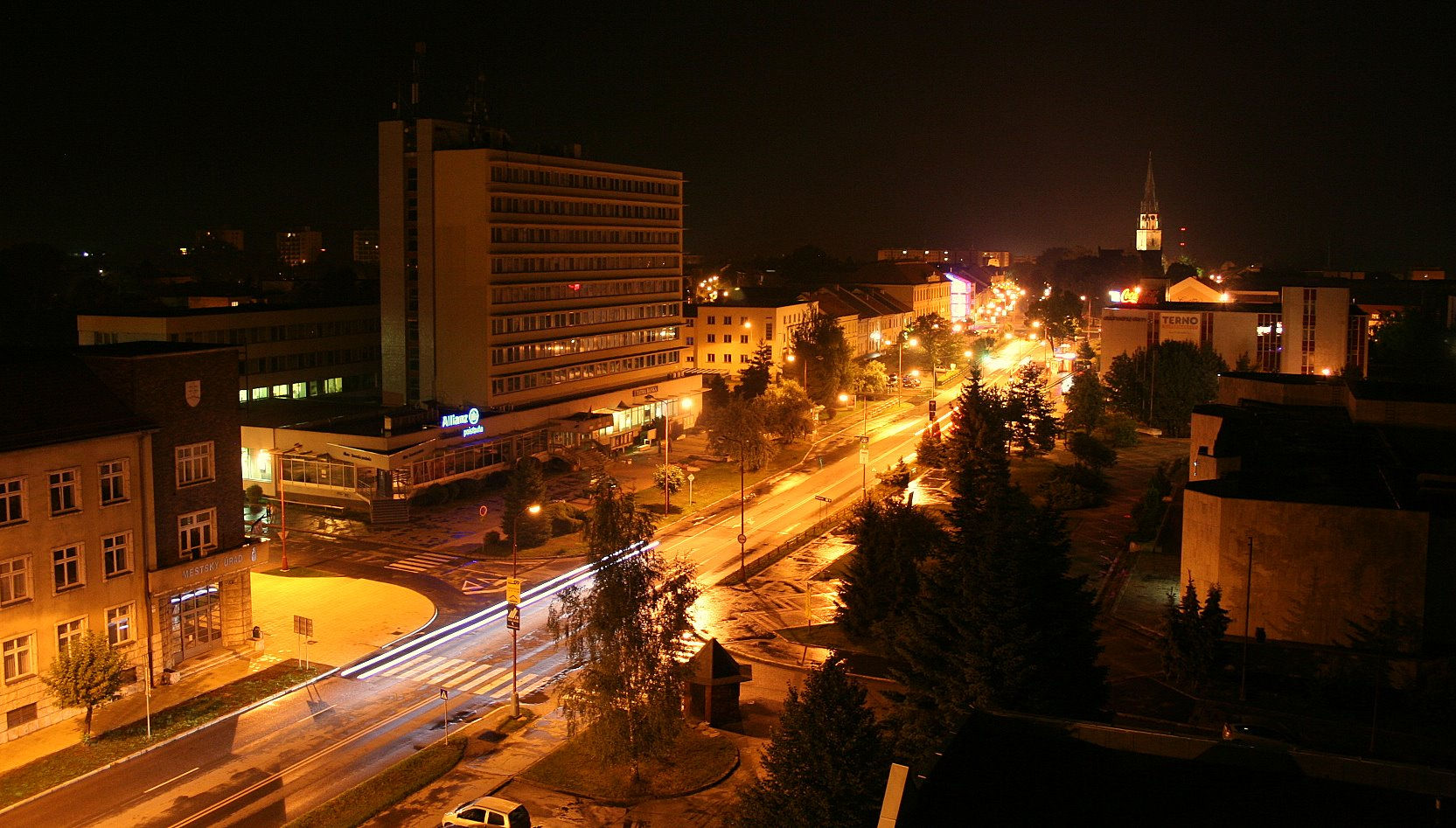
Main street in Spišská Nová Ves

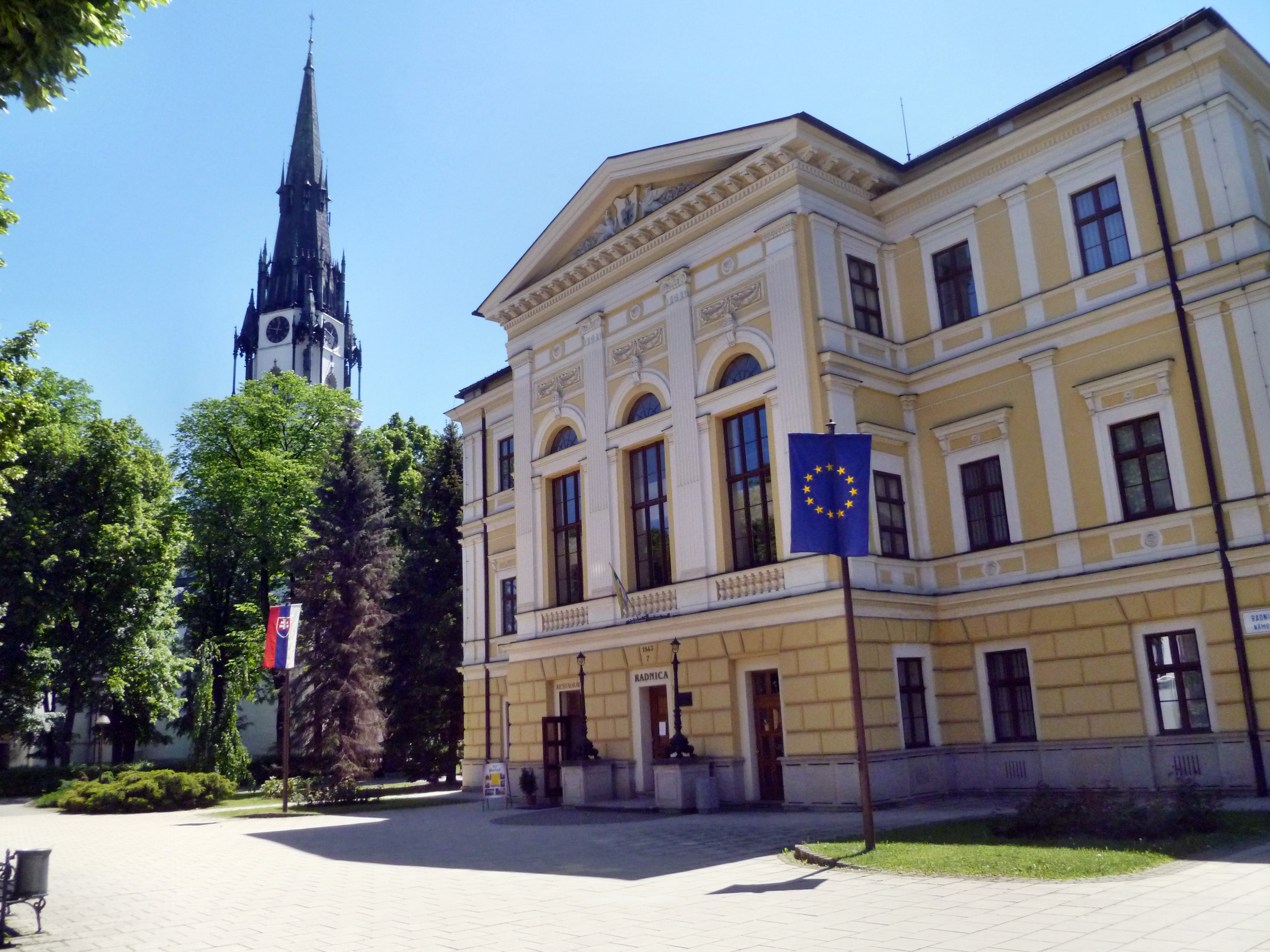
Town hall and church

Spišská Nová Ves is a tourist destination today, both because of the town itself and because of the natural environment of the nearby Slovak Paradise mountains. The core of the town is a lens-shaped square (a square with bulging sides), typical of medieval towns. It is a cultural, administrative, and business centre of the Spiš region, and is rich in art and historical monuments.

Foremost is the three-naved Gothic church of the Assumption of the Virgin Mary standing in the centre of the town. Its construction dates back to the 14th century, and its architecture has been partly preserved. The bas-relief of the Virgin Mary's Coronation on the Gothic tympanum on the south portal of the church is considered to be amongst the most beautiful in the Spiš region. It contains carvings by Master Paul of Levoča. The side pillars are topped by Gothic pinnacles terminating in crossed rosettes. A rosette with tracery crowns the entrance of the church. The tower is 87m high, the tallest church tower in Slovakia. The neogothic top of the tower dates from 1893 and was executed by the architect Imrich Steindl. The neogothic altar dates from the end of the 19th century. The church contains several liturgical treasures: a cross-shaped silver (and partly gilded) reliquary by the Sienese court jeweller Nicolas Gallicus (first half of the 14th century - but the initials NC may also refer to a possible contributor Nicolaus Castellanus), a silver (partly gilded) crucifix and monstrance attributed to Antonio from Košice (early 16th century), a chalice by Jan Kolbenhayer (1795) and a rare bronze baptismal font (second half 13th century). The Calvary Group (1520) is another masterpiece from the workshop of the Master Paul of Levoča. The church's vaulted ceiling contains early Renaissance paintings with the Evangelists and four angels playing on musical instruments.

The Evangelical church, standing next to the town hall, was built in Classicist style between 1790 and 1796. It has a cross-shaped ground plan. Inside is an altar piece of Christ on the Mount of Olives, painted by Danish painter Stunder. The water well is decorated with an alabaster relief of Christ with the Good Samaritan.

Another valuable architectural monument is the Province House, now housing the Spiš museum. It has a baroque façade, but the basement dates from the 13th century. This house was the town hall from the Middle Ages until 1777. The peace treaty between John Jiskra of Brandýs and the Hungarian king Vladislav was signed here in 1443. Its façade includes the underpass "Levoca gate" with in the middle of its arch the crest of the Province of XVI Spiš towns. The upper part of the façade is decorated with rococo stucco motives (rocaille) representing in Latin the moral qualities required of a town official : (from left to right) PONDERE SOLO (According to importance only), UTQUIS MERETUR (as one deserves), SUUM CUIQUE (give everyone his due), DIE NOCTUQUE (day and night), IN SOMNIS CUSTOS (guardian during sleep), HINC OCULOS NUSQUAM (not turning his eyes away).

The Town Hall was built between 1777-1779 in the Classical style, and was reconstructed in the mid-1990s. The main façade faces south while the main entrance is on the north side. The south façade has three big arched windows situated between four semi-columns under a massive tympanum. Within the tympanum is the city's coat-of-arms between two griffins. The two inner columns have Ionic capitals. The council chamber occupies two floors and is lavishly decorated with pilasters and sgraffito with motifs of drapery alternating with the city coat-of-arms.

The theatre building "Reduta" was built in art-nouveau style between 1899 and 1902 by the Budapest architect Koloman Gerster. He divided its northern and southern parts by a risalith (a projection jutting out of the façade). He accentuated the corners of the building with four turrets. He prolonged the western part into a semicircular vestibule. The stage wall is decorated with murals by the local Slovak artist Jozef Hanula. Today, the building combines a theatre, a richly decorated concert hall, and a restaurant.

== Population ==
Historical population
Year	Pop.	±%
1970	22,345	—
1980	31,917	+42.8%
1991	39,218	+22.9%
2001	39,193	−0.1%
2011	38,045	−2.9%
2021	35,431	−6.9%
Source: Censuses

Population statistic (10 years)
Year	1995	2005	2015	2025
Count	38,992	38,534	37,594	34,023
Difference		−1.17%	−2.43%	−9.49%

Population statistic
Year	2024	2025
Count	34,255	34,023
Difference		−0.67%

It has a population of 34,023 people (31 December 2025).

=== Ethnicity ===
Census 2021 (1+%)
Ethnicity	Number	Fraction
Slovak	32,607	92.02%
Not found out	2401	6.77%
Romani	593	1.67%
Total	35,431	

In year 2021 was 35,431 people by ethnicity 32,607 as Slovak, 2401 as Not found out, 593 as Romani, 309 as Rusyn, 184 as Czech, 103 as Other, 87 as German, 72 as Hungarian, 50 as Vietnamese, 50 as Russian, 47 as Ukrainian, 33 as Polish, 15 as Chinese, 12 as Austrian, 11 as English, 10 as Italian, 6 as Jewish, 6 as Greek, 5 as Moravian, 5 as Albanian, 4 as Irish, 4 as Serbian, 4 as Silesian, 4 as French, 4 as Croatian, 3 as Romanian, 3 as Bulgarian, 1 as Turkish and 1 as Canadian.

Note on population: The difference values of population numbers in the table "Population statistic" and in the sections "Ethnicity" & "Religion" is caused by the use of various statistical methods.

=== Religion ===
Census 2021 (1+%)
Religion	Number	Fraction
Roman Catholic Church	20,595	58.13%
None	8792	24.81%
Not found out	3329	9.4%
Greek Catholic Church	1047	2.96%
Evangelical Church	798	2.25%
Total	35,431	

In year 2021 was 35,431 people by religion 20,595 from Roman Catholic Church, 8792 from None, 3329 from Not found out, 1047 from Greek Catholic Church, 798 from Evangelical Church, 144 from Eastern Orthodox Church, 126 from Christian Congregations in Slovakia, 115 from Ad hoc movements, 111 from Other and not ascertained christian church, 104 from Jehovah's Witnesses, 64 from Other, 42 from Buddhism, 28 from Paganism and natural spirituality, 26 from Church of the Brethren, 24 from Calvinist Church, 24 from Seventh-day Adventist Church, 18 from Islam, 12 from Apostolic Church, 10 from United Methodist Church, 5 from Old Catholic Church, 5 from Hinduism, 3 from Jewish community, 3 from Church of Jesus Christ of Latter-day Saints, 3 from Baptists Church, 2 from New Apostolic Church and 1 from Czechoslovak Hussite Church.

== Notable people ==
- Jozef Dolný (born 1992), footballer
- Nora Jenčušová (born 2002), road cyclist
- Matúš Leskovjanský (born 1987), ice hockey player
- Tomáš Nádašdi (born 1980), ice hockey player
- Theodor Posewitz (1851–1917), Hungarian geologist
- Károly Thern (1817–1886), composer
- Ľubomír Vaic (born 1977), ice hockey player
- Ernest Valko (1953–2010), judge
- Helen Vari (1931–2023), Canadian philanthropist
- Vladislav Zvara (born 1971), footballer

== Transportation ==
Spišská Nová Ves railway station is a junction between the Košice–Žilina railway, which is part of Slovakia's main east-west rail corridor, and a 12 km (7.5 mi) spur line to Levoča. Regular passenger services on the spur line have been suspended since 2003. Public transport is provided by the Eurobus, a.s. company and consists of 15 bus lines. Tickets can be bought from the driver, and the fare is 0,60€ or 0,30€ reduced fare.

== Twin towns – sister cities ==
Spišská Nová Ves is twinned with:

- L'Aigle, France
- Alsfeld, Germany
- Clausthal-Zellerfeld, Germany
- Grójec, Poland
- Havlíčkův Brod, Czech Republic
- Joinville, Brazil
- Kisújszállás, Hungary
- Myślenice, Poland
- Nitra, Slovakia
- Preveza, Greece
- Tiachiv, Ukraine
- Tongzhou (Beijing), China
- Youngstown, United States
