= Marlene Matus =

Ukrainian photographer and educator (1939–2014)

- Марлен Матус
- Born: July 11, 1939; Khabarovsk, Russian SFSR, Soviet Union (now Russia)
- Died: April 24, 2014 (aged 74); Dnipropetrovsk, Ukraine (now Dnipro, Ukraine)
- Occupation: Photographer
- Notable work: Vesnyanka Cinema Center

Marlene Matus (Ukrainian: Марлен Матус; 11 July 1939 - 24 April 2014) was a Ukrainian photographer and educator based in Dnipro. He was known for his documentary-style work, particularly for the photo series Pages from an Old Album, and for his role in developing photography in the region. Matus co-founded the Dnipropetrovsk Regional Children’s and Youth Film Center "Vesnyanka" and later established the Dnipro and Zaporizhzhia Photo Clubs, all of which have been important institutions fo rphotographic education in Ukraine.

== Early life ==
Matus was born on 11 July 1939 in the city of Khabarovsk, which was then part of the Russian SFSR in the Soviet Union. After the start of Operation Barbarossa in June 1941 and the invasion of the Soviet Union, his family moved with him to Guryev, and later, after the war in 1946, to the city of Dnepropetrovsk in the Ukrainian SSR.

After developing an interest in photography at school, he went to do his mandatory service in the Soviet Armed Forces, before returning to Dnepropetrovsk and working as a photographer. He first began doing foreign exhibitions in Katowice in Poland in 1967.

== Photography work and teaching ==
In 1973, he helped found the Dnipropetrovsk Regional Children's and Youth Film Center "Vesnyanka". It was based off the cine-photo studi of the regional Young Technicians' Station. This was the first in the USSR and the only in the Ukrainian SSR youth film center. It currently, at the time of his death in 2014, stood as the only children's cinematic education center remainiing in Ukraine from the Soviet era. "Vesnyanka" was created by the idea of Matus's friend, Yuri Skakhin, who made him artistic director of the project upon Matus's return from the army, and Skakhin then departed to work in television. He later also, in 1978, founded the Dnipro Photo Club in 1978 for adults, where they met at the House of Scientists and he helped arrange exhibitions for the photo club in the USSR. In particular, he proposed to make an all-Union exhibition "Man and Metal" for the Day of the Metallurgist, and he got 1,560 works from his club to be sent to the exhibition. He served for many years as both head of "Vesnyanka" and the "Dnipro Photo Club" until his death in 2014. Later, in 1980, the second creative association with "Vesnyanka" was opened, and work began to expand the program into general-education schools. In 1990, it was renamed. Today, it has about 800 students each year.

His most well-known work is the series "Pages from an Old Album", which was considered a landmark in her career. "Pages from an Old Album" serves as a photographic diary of the 1950s, documenting everyday life when she was eleven years old, which has been argued was impactful because it was a more unselfconscious perspective. It was also notable for its candidness, as during the Joseph Stalin era, most people were wary of cameras, but a child could photograph freely. She returned to the series in the 1980s and compiled it together to be first exhibited in Kaunas in 1984, reflecting her belief that photography should be objective. The entire series consisted of about 130 negatives. He would later return to the work a few years later to follow it up with "Based on the Pages of an Old Album", in which she traced those same people in the photographs from the 1950s to 1991.

He was also responsible for having helped found the Zaporizhzhia Photo Club.

== Personal life ==
Matus died on 24 April 2014 after a prolonged illness. He was survived by his widow, Nina Dovgiallo, who was a radiophysicist, painter, and a candidate for Master of Radio Sports.

== Honours and awards ==
He was personally awarded with the "Excellence in Education" honour by both the USSR and Ukraine and the "Sofia Rusova" Badge from the Ministry of Education of Ukraine. During his lifetime, his students won over 100 international awards.

== Legacy ==
In July 2015 the Dnipropetrovsk Art Museum held an exhibition entitled "Retrospective" to honor the member of Matus. It contained a retrospective of about 200 photographs by Matus, presenting fragments of large thematic series.

Later, in July 2021, a film laboratory entitled the "Marlene Matus Creative Laboratory of Children's Cinema" opened in Dnipro. A children's art festival in Dnipro also bears his name.
