= Matúš Leskovjanský =

Slovak ice hockey player

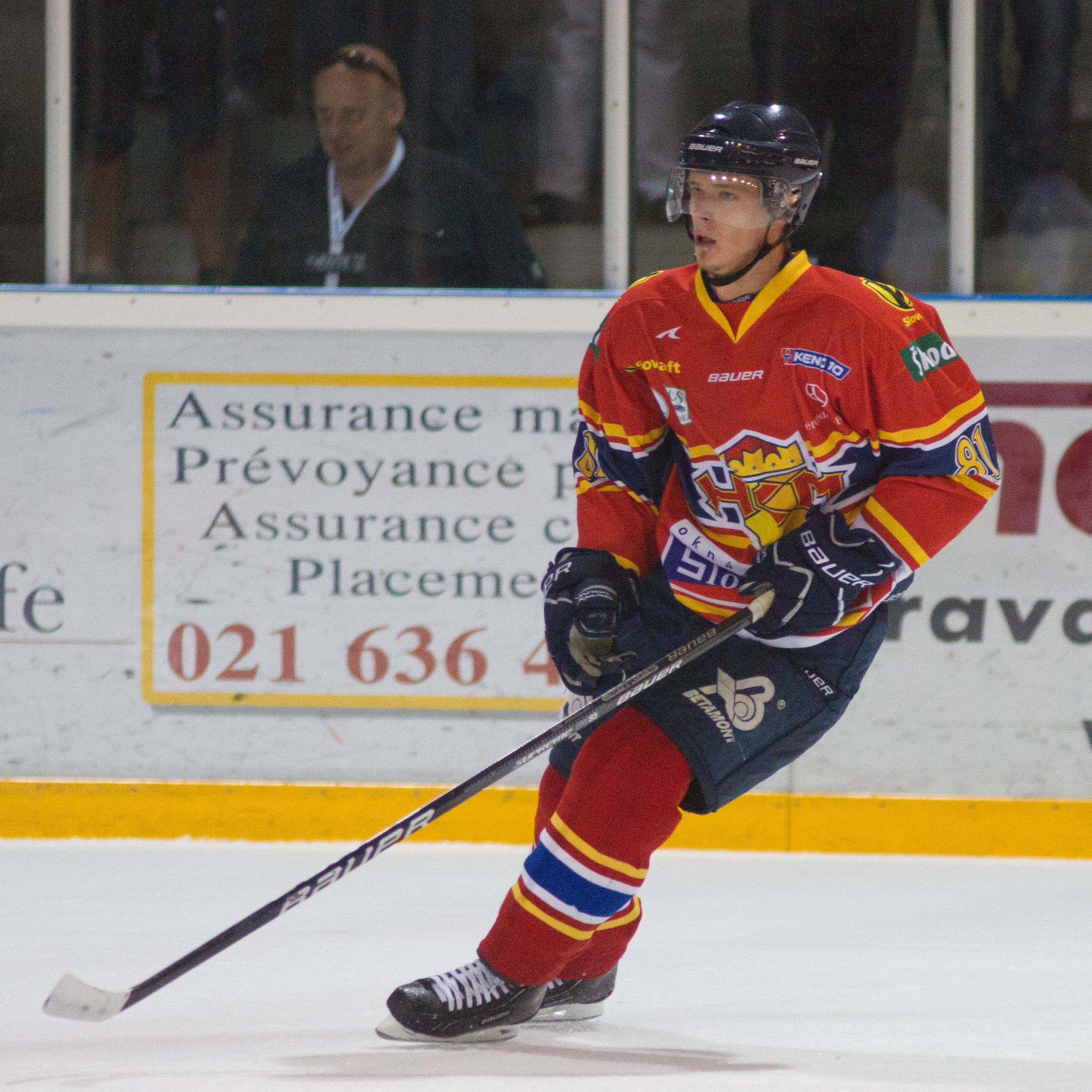
- Born: May 29, 1987 (age 38) Spišská Nová Ves, Czechoslovakia
- Height: 6 ft 1 in (185 cm)
- Weight: 181 lb (82 kg; 12 st 13 lb)
- Position: Forward
- Shoots: Right
- Slovak Extraliga team: HKm Zvolen
- Playing career: 2005–present

Matúš Leskovjanský (born 29 May, 1987) is a Slovak professional ice hockey player who is currently playing for HKm Zvolen in the Slovak Extraliga.
