= La Grande Odyssée =

Annual sled dog race in France

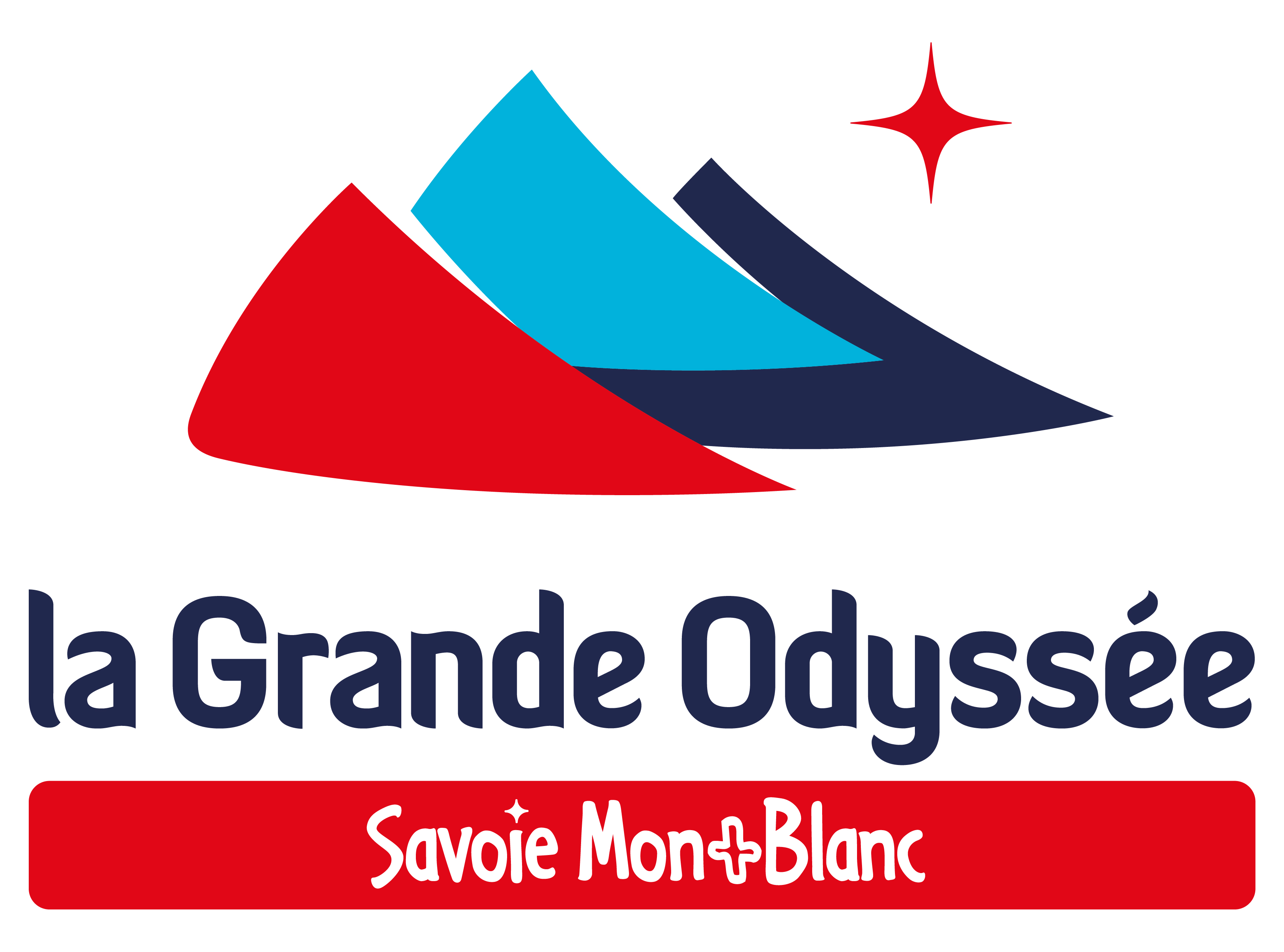
Former logo for La Grande Odyssée.

La Grande Odyssée (English: The Great Odyssey) is an annual long-distance sled dog race held every January in France. It was first held in January 2005. The 1st place prize for the 2026 race is 6000 Euros, while 2nd place will receive €4000 and 3rd place will receive €2000. The event has been held annually since the first race in 2005, and will hold its 22nd edition from 10–22 January 2026.

== History ==
La Grande Odyssée was previously called La Grande Odyssée Savoie Mont Blanc, paying homage to the Savoie department of France, which the race often travels through, as well as Mont Blanc, the highest mountain in the Alps and one of the highest mountains in Europe. The race was started by Nicolas Vanier and Henry Kam in 2005. The race originally traveled through both the Swiss Alps and the French Alps, but the last year the race traveled through the Swiss Alps appears to be 2012.

In the 19th edition of the race in 2023, the race was renamed to La Grande Odyssée VVF, named after the title partner, the tour operator Villages Vacances de France (VVF). In 2025, it was announced that the name would change again in the 22nd edition of the race in 2026. The race would now be called La Grande Odyssée Royal Canin, after the title partner Royal Canin, a dog and cat food manufacturer and supplier. The 2026 race is expected to draw over 60,000 spectators.

== The race ==
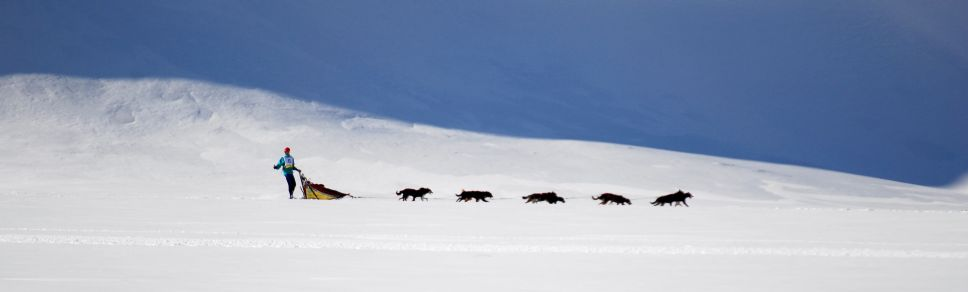
Musher on the Petit Mont-Cenis Plateau

The course of La Grande Odysée can differ from race to race. The 2026 race will pass through Haute-Savoie, Savoie, and Isère. The 2026 race will race across a distance of 400 km (250 mi), with 12,000 m (39,000 ft) of cumulative elevation gain. The first stage will start in Avoriaz, and the final stage will finish in Villard de Lans.

The race consists of different stages (11 total stages in the 2026 race) over several days (13 days in 2026). The 2026 race will pass through 20 resorts, towns and villages of the Auvergne-Rhône-Alpes Region along the way. It is expected to feature 65 mushers with their 600 racing dogs.

The full race of 2026 (not including trophies) is limited to a maximum of 30 teams. Each musher can have a pool of 9 to 12 dogs, but can only race a minimum of 6 dogs or a maximum of 10 dogs at a time. They must finish each stage with no less than 4 dogs hooked on the line. A minimum of 2 dogs must be rested per day. Dog health is of utmost concern, and dogs are monitored by veterinarians throughout the race. The musher must have in his sleigh or on his/her person, various equipment items which are required for the safety and survival of the musher and the dogs in the event of an emergency (including, but not limited to: avalanche victim detector, GPS beacon, and survival blankets). These items are checked before the start of each stage.

== Trophies ==
Trophies are shorter races that take place over multiple days on the stages of the La Grande Odysée. These trophies can be entered by mushers who choose not to enter the full race. The 2026 race will consist of 4 trophies: The Haute Savoie Trophy, which will last 3 days and will last 3 days and will cover stages 1 and 2; Trophy 2, which will last 3 days and will cover stages 3–5; the Allianz Trophy, which will last 3 days and will cover stages 6 and 7; and Trophy 4, which will last 3 days and will cover stages 9–11. The Allianz Trophy is reserved only for 100% Nordic dogs.

== Race results ==
Every year from 2018-2023, Frenchman Rémy Coste was awarded first place. He has won the race a total of seven times (the most of any other musher), but decided not to participate in the race in 2024, wishing to explore racing in Alaska instead.

Year	1st Musher	Time (h:min:s)	2nd Musher	3rd Musher
2005	Jessie Royer	35:59:14	Jacques Philip	Grant Beck
2006	Jacques Philip	40:55:59	Ken Anderson	Timothy Hunt
2007	Race ended due to snow conditions			
2008	Petter Karlsson	36:03:51	Emil Inauen	Ketil Reitan
2009	Radek Havrda	40:12:17	Robert Sørlie	Sigrid Ekran
2010	Emil Inauen	40:17:48	Radek Havrda	Jiri Vondrak
2011	Miloš Gonda	27:49:32	Martin Bily	Jean-Philippe Pontier
2012	Radek Havrda	39:24:12	Miloš Gonda	Jean-Philippe Pontier
2013	Jiri Vondrak	42:22:39		
2014	Jean-Philippe Pontier	40:32:01		
2015	Radek Havrda	22:42:17		
2016	Rémy Coste	24:15:13		
2017	Jiri Vondrak	20:34:10		
2018	Rémy Coste	28:58:19		
2019	Remy Coste	16:42:01		
2020	Rémy Coste	16:10:45		
2021	Rémy Coste	14:18:54		
2022	Rémy Coste	14:59:27		
2023	Rémy Coste	09:15:08		
2024	Hans Lindahl	11:01:05	Iker Ozkoidi	Elsa Borgey
2025	Iker Ozkoidi	13:46:22	Elsa Borgey	Cindy Duport

== See also ==
- Sled dog racing
- List of sled dog races
- Iditarod (Alaska)
- Yukon Quest (From Alaska to Yukon)
- Finnmarksløpet (Norway)
- American Dog Derby (Idaho, USA)
