= Kautokeino (village) =

Village in Finnmark, Norway

Kautokeino: Kautokeino (Norwegian); Guovdageaidnu (Northern Sami); Koutokeino (Kven)
- Village
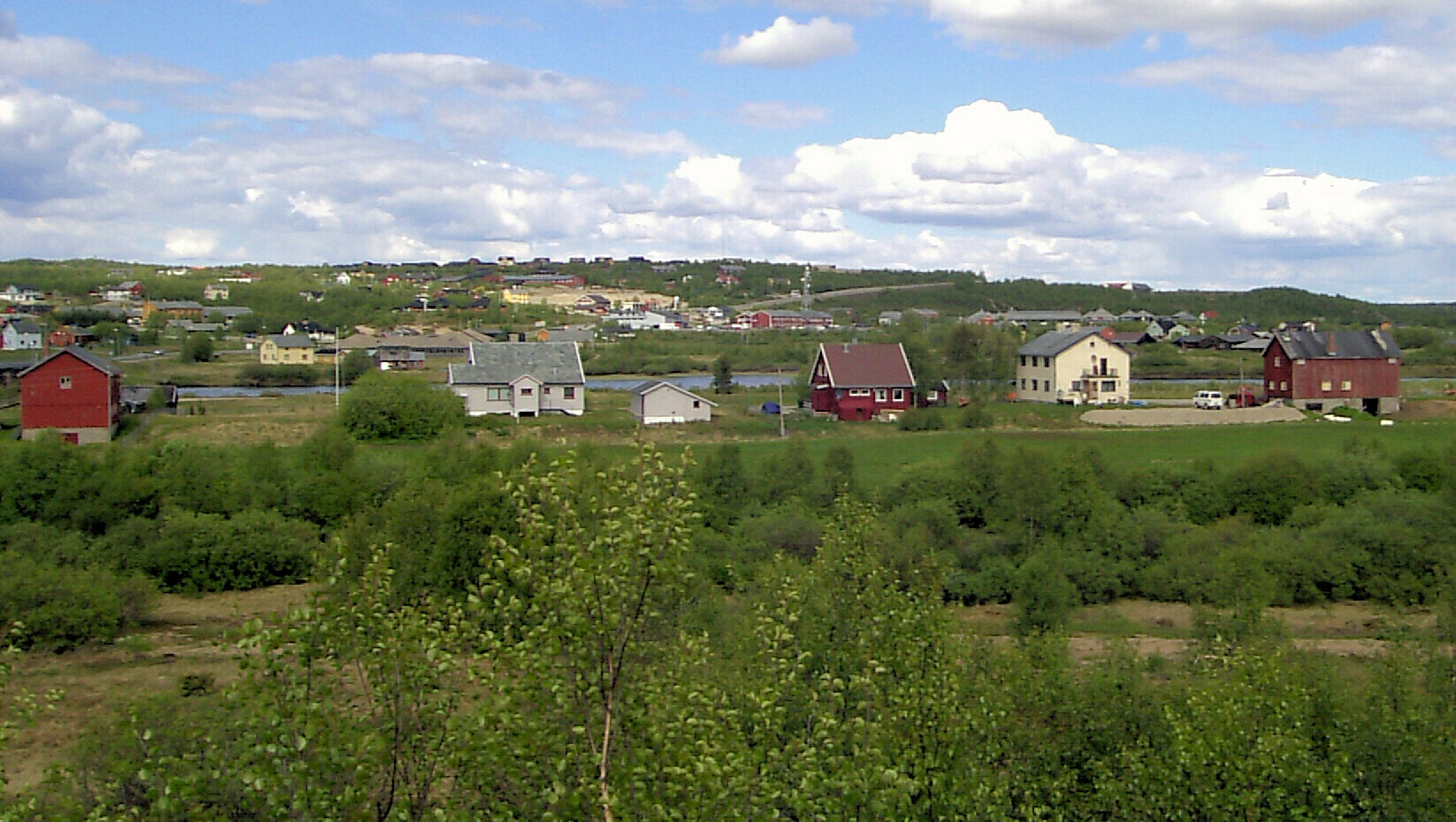
- View of the village
- Interactive map of Kautokeino
- Location within Finnmark Location within Norway
- Coordinates: 69°00′44″N 23°02′27″E
- Country: Norway
- Region: Northern Norway
- County: Finnmark
- District: Vest-Finnmark
- Municipality: Kautokeino

Area
  - Total: 2.59 km^{2} (1.00 sq mi)
- Elevation: 319 m (1,047 ft)

Population (2023)
  - Total: 1,459
  - Density: 563/km^{2} (1,460/sq mi)
- Time zone: UTC+01:00 (CET)
  - Summer (DST): UTC+02:00 (CEST)
- Post Code: 9520 Kautokeino

Kautokeino (Norwegian) (Guovdageaidnu (Northern Sami), or Koutokeino (Kven)) is the administrative centre of Kautokeino Municipality in Finnmark county, Norway. The village is located along the river Kautokeinoelva, about 60 kilometres (37 mi) south of the village of Masi and about 40 kilometres (25 mi) north of the Finland–Norway border.

The 2.59-square-kilometre (640-acre) village has a population (2023) of 1,459 and a population density of 563 inhabitants per square kilometre (1,460/sq mi). The village is the site of Kautokeino Church.

The European route E45 runs through the village on its way from the town of Alta as it heads south. The small Kautokeino Airport lies just to the north of the village. Sámi University College is also located in the village.

== History ==
In 1852, the village was the site of the Kautokeino rebellion.

From 1882 to 1883 Sophus Tromholt ran a Northern Lights observatory here as a part of the first international polar year. He did not succeed in photographic recording of the Northern Lights, but used the camera to photograph landscapes, buildings and people. He was the first to photograph Kautokeino's Sami as character portraits with full names, not as tourist props or race examples. The Tromholt Collection became part of Unesco's Norwegian document heritage register in 2012, according to a display integrated with the facade of Stein Rokkan Building at the University of Bergen. Kautokeino is used as a setting in TV drama Outlier (2020).

== Climate ==
Climate data for Kautokeino 1991-2020 (307 m, extremes 1891-2022)
Month	Jan	Feb	Mar	Apr	May	Jun	Jul	Aug	Sep	Oct	Nov	Dec	Year
Record high °C (°F)	7.0 (44.6)	7.0 (44.6)	8.3 (46.9)	13.8 (56.8)	28.0 (82.4)	29.8 (85.6)	30.0 (86.0)	28.4 (83.1)	22.8 (73.0)	13.4 (56.1)	7.6 (45.7)	7.2 (45.0)	30.0 (86.0)
Mean daily maximum °C (°F)	−8.9 (16.0)	−8.5 (16.7)	−3.8 (25.2)	2.1 (35.8)	8.2 (46.8)	14.7 (58.5)	18.5 (65.3)	15.8 (60.4)	10.4 (50.7)	2.5 (36.5)	−3.9 (25.0)	−6.7 (19.9)	3.4 (38.1)
Daily mean °C (°F)	−14.1 (6.6)	−13.7 (7.3)	−9.2 (15.4)	−3.0 (26.6)	3.7 (38.7)	9.9 (49.8)	13.4 (56.1)	11.1 (52.0)	6.0 (42.8)	−1.2 (29.8)	−8.4 (16.9)	−11.8 (10.8)	−1.4 (29.4)
Mean daily minimum °C (°F)	−20.0 (−4.0)	−19.4 (−2.9)	−15.1 (4.8)	−7.9 (17.8)	−0.3 (31.5)	5.5 (41.9)	8.8 (47.8)	6.5 (43.7)	2.6 (36.7)	−3.5 (25.7)	−12.2 (10.0)	−17.1 (1.2)	−6.0 (21.2)
Record low °C (°F)	−50.3 (−58.5)	−48.8 (−55.8)	−41.5 (−42.7)	−33.7 (−28.7)	−20.7 (−5.3)	−5.0 (23.0)	−3.9 (25.0)	−6.2 (20.8)	−12.7 (9.1)	−33.8 (−28.8)	−40.7 (−41.3)	−45.0 (−49.0)	−50.3 (−58.5)
Average precipitation mm (inches)	22.1 (0.87)	19.4 (0.76)	13.8 (0.54)	17.5 (0.69)	33.5 (1.32)	58.5 (2.30)	71.5 (2.81)	64.8 (2.55)	42.4 (1.67)	31.3 (1.23)	24.4 (0.96)	25.0 (0.98)	424.2 (16.68)
Average precipitation days (≥ 1.0 mm)	7	8	6	7	9	10	10	10	9	8	7	8	99
Source 1: yr.no/eklima/Norwegian Meteorological Institute
Source 2: Noaa WMO averages 91-2020 Norway
