= The Kautokeino Rebellion =

2008 Norwegian drama film

- Norwegian theatrical release poster
- Directed by: Nils Gaup
- Written by: Nils Isak Eira, Nils Gaup
- Produced by: Tove Kløvvik
- Starring: Nikolaj Coster-Waldau; Mikael Persbrandt; Michael Nyqvist; Nils Gaup; Mikkel Gaup; Anni-Kristiina Juuso
- Cinematography: Philip Øgaard
- Edited by: Jan-Olof Svarvar
- Music by: Mari Boine; Svein Schultz; Herman Rundberg
- Production company: Rubicon
- Release date: 18 January 2008
- Running time: 96 minutes
- Country: Norway
- Languages: Northern Sami; Norwegian; Swedish
- Budget: 50,000,000 NOK
- Box office: $4,879,311

The Kautokeino Rebellion (Norwegian: Kautokeino-opprøret, Northern Sami: Guovdageainnu stuimmit) is a 2008 film based on the true story of the Kautokeino Rebellion in 1852, in response to the Norwegian exploitation of the Sami community at that time. It was directed by Nils Gaup and was released in January 2008. The music to this film was mostly composed by Sami musician Mari Boine.

== Cast ==
- Mikael Persbrandt as Carl Johan Ruth
- Michael Nyqvist as Lars Levi Læstadius
- Nils Peder Isaksen Gaup as Mons Somby
- Mikkel Gaup as Aslak Hætta
- Anni-Kristiina Juuso as Ellen Aslaksdatter Skum
- Jørgen Langhelle
- Bjørn Sundquist as Pastor Stockfleth
- Stig Henrik Hoff
- Peter Andersson as Lars Johan Bucht
- Silje Holtet as Anne Elise Blix
- Eirik Junge Eliassen as Prästen Zetliz
- Aslat Mahtte Gaup as Mathis Hætta
- Inger Utsi as Inger Andersdatter Spein
- Ole Nicklas Guttorm as Litle Aslak (son)
- Inga Juuso as Grandmother
- Beaska Niilas as Rasmus Spein
- Jovsset Heandrat as Lars Hætta
- Nikolaj Coster-Waldau as Bishop Juell

== Soundtrack ==
A four-track soundtrack CD with music by Mari Boine, Svein Schultz, and Herman Rundberg was released by Sony/ATV Music Publishing Scandinavia.

=== Track list ===
1. "Elen Skum"
2. "Válddi vuoigna - The Spirit of Power"
3. "Deaivideapmi - Confrontation"
4. "Doaivut ja vuoimmehuvvat - Hope and Defeat"

== See also ==
- Pathfinder (1987 film)
