= Niillas Somby =

Sami political rights activist, journalist and photographer

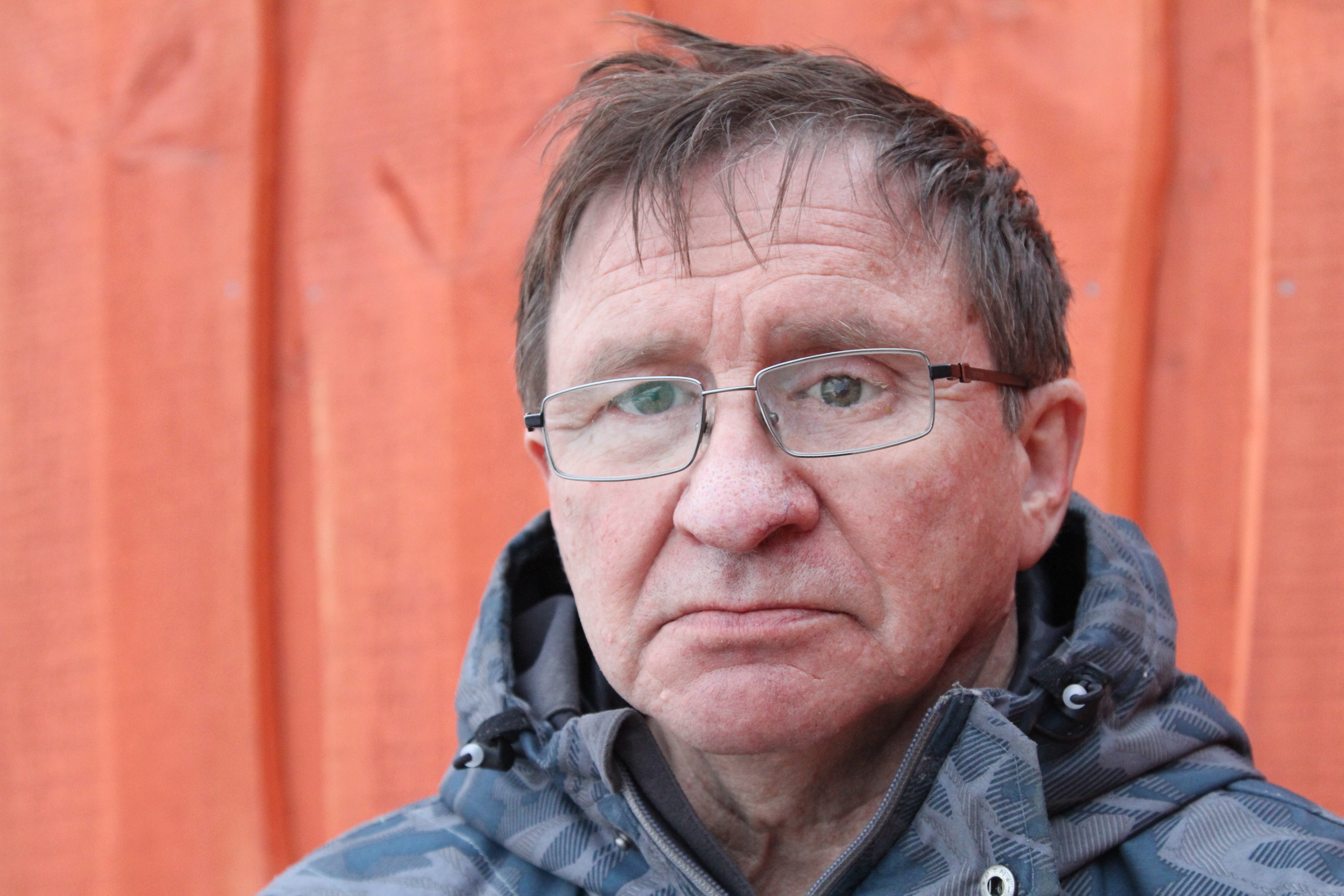
- Born: 4 December 1948 (age 76); Norway
- Occupation(s): Sami political rights activist, cultural worker.

Niillas Somby (formally known as Nils Somby) is a Sami political rights activist, journalist and photographer. He was one of seven hunger strikers during the Alta controversy, and lost an arm during a sabotage action.

The documentary film Give Us Our Skeletons (directed by Paul-Anders Simma in 1999) follows Somby's quest to retrieve the heads of his ancestors, Mons Somby and Aslak Hætta, from the University of Oslo in Norway.

== See also ==
- Mons Somby
- Give Us Our Skeletons
