= Reindeer herding =

Practice of herding reindeer in a limited area

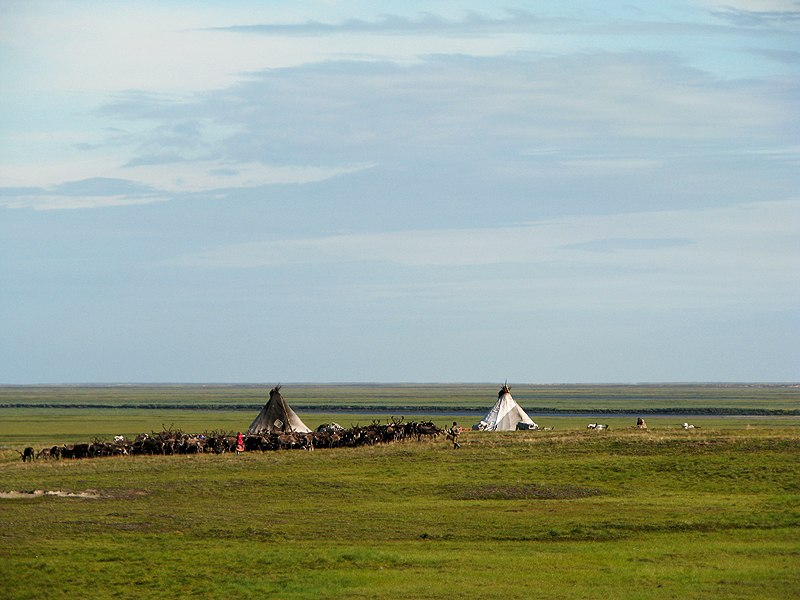
Nenets people in Russia

Reindeer herding is when reindeer are herded by people in a limited area. Currently, reindeer are the only semi-domesticated animal which naturally belong to the North. Reindeer herding is conducted in nine countries: Norway, Finland, Sweden, Russia, Greenland, the United States (Alaska), Mongolia, China and Canada. A small herd is also maintained in Scotland's Cairngorms National Park.

Reindeer herding is conducted by individuals within some kind of cooperation, in forms such as families, districts, Sámi and Yakut villages and sovkhozy (collective farms). A person who conducts reindeer herding is called a reindeer herder and approximately 100,000 people are engaged in reindeer herding today around the circumpolar North.

== Domestication ==
The domestication of the reindeer does not lend itself to a simple explanation. There is no doubt that when the glaciers retreated at the end of the last Ice Age, people followed reindeer to the North, using traps during the reindeer hunt. Modern archaeological data (rock art) suggest that domestication may have taken place for the first time in the Sayan Mountains between Russia and Mongolia, possibly 2–3 thousand years ago. According to another theory, the Tungus (the ancestors of the present Evenks and Evens) independently domesticated reindeer to the east of Lake Baikal, and that reindeer herding originated in several places simultaneously. Reindeer herders have their own stories about how reindeer were domesticated, and about the relationship between wild and domestic reindeer. Whatever the debate, the very fact of domination of a reindeer led to a reindeer revolution that spread to the North, East, and West. Sleds pulled by reindeer appeared later than dog sleds. The reindeer sleds made accessible areas of the tundra and mountains, which can only be accessed by helicopter. Reindeer became the preferred vehicle on the expanses of Eurasia.

== Sámi ==
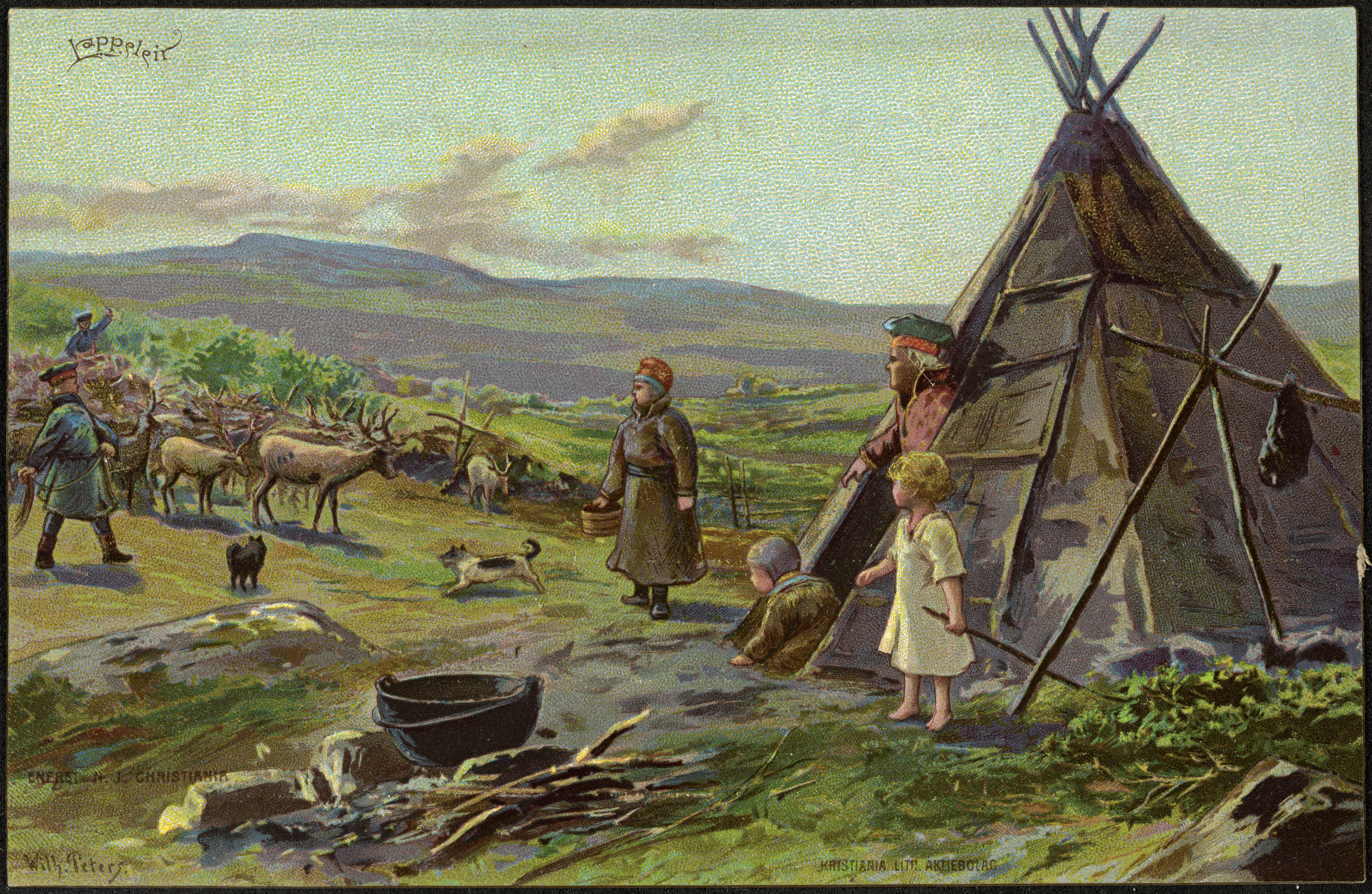
Sámi people in Norway, c. 1900, painted by Wilhelm Peters

The Sámi people have lived and worked in siiddat (reindeer herding groups) and reindeer have been used for transport, milk, and meat. The siida is an ancient Sámi community system within a designated area but it can also be defined as a working partnership where the members had individual rights to resources but helped each other with the management of the herds, or when hunting and fishing. The siida could consist of several families and their herds.

In the 19th and 20th centuries, the traditional regions of Sámi reindeer husbandry were divided by the state borders of Norway, Sweden, Finland, and Russia, which led to the destabilization of traditional reindeer husbandry practices. The state borders (in 1852 between Norway and Russia, and in 1889 between Sweden and Finland, then owned by Russia) have divided the reindeer siids.

=== Scandinavia ===
In Scandinavia, about 6,500 Sámi are engaged in reindeer herding. In Norway and Sweden reindeer herding is characterized by large herds and a high degree of mechanization in all regions. The main product of reindeer herding is meat. However, skins, bones, and horns are important raw materials for making clothes and handicrafts. The involvement of young people in Norway and Sweden is hindered by legislative acts, and the lack of pastures and economic opportunities hamper the growth of the industry. The total number of reindeer in the Sámi territory, with the exception of Russia, is privately owned, despite the fact that in many aspects the reindeer grazing is carried out collectively within the framework of the Siid.

==== Norway ====
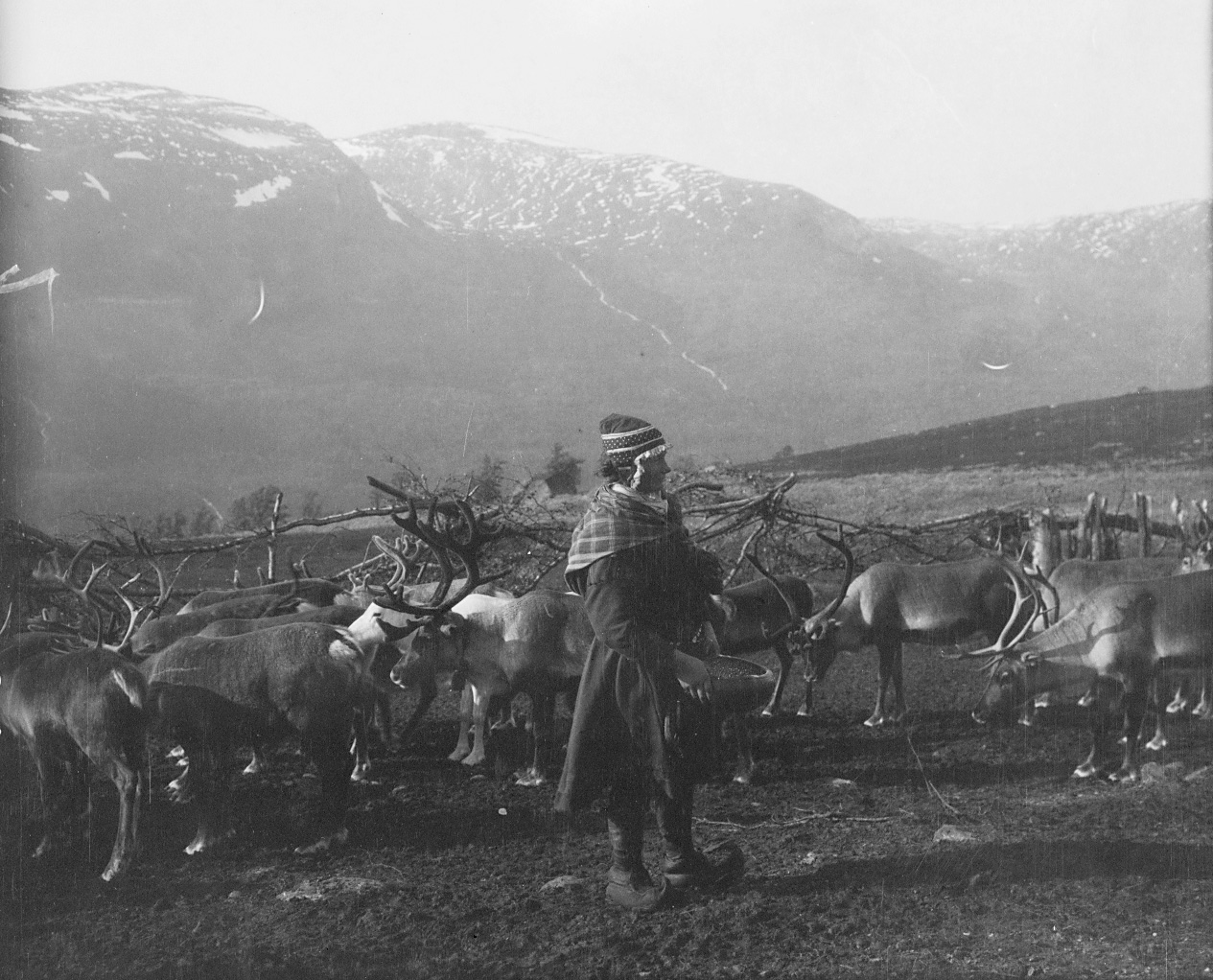
Reindeer herding in Norway

In Norway, there are six pasture territories, divided into 77 pasture areas. Only ethnic Sámi have the right to reindeer husbandry in these areas. Reindeer experiences, including sled rides and visits to Sámi camps, have become a popular tourist activity in Finnmark and Troms. The reindeer is also bred in southern Norway in special concession areas. There, reindeer herding can also be practiced by non-Sámi Norwegians. The reindeer graze on pastures with an area of approximately 146 thousand km^{2} in the provinces of Finnmark, Troms, Nordland and Trøndelag, which is 40% of the mainland part of Norway. Reindeer herding is managed by the Norwegian Reindeer Husbandry Administration, which is directly subordinate to the Ministry of Agriculture of Norway. 2936 reindeer herders graze about 240 thousands deer, most of which are based in the province of Finnmark.

Reindeer herding is regulated by the New Norwegian Reindeer Herding Act of 2007. Only specified persons have the right to a reindeer earmark and to conduct reindeer husbandry in the Sámi reindeer herding area. Only a person who is a Sámi and themselves, their parents or their grandparents have or had reindeer herding as their primary occupation qualifies for an earmark.

The number of reindeer in Norway is calculated after slaughtering but before the calving starts in May, and it fluctuates around 200,000. In Norway, the reindeer numbers were 242,000 in 1990, 172,000 in 2000, and 241,000 in 2007. The most common reasons for these fluctuations include difficult climatic situations during several winters, increasing predation levels and poor pasture conditions.

The economic situation for reindeer herders in Norway varies greatly. Modern reindeer herders have to adapt to a wide variety of changes in the local, regional and national economy. Reindeer herding is in terms of taxation seen as a for-profit-business and for a reindeer herder a common tax form is as a private entrepreneur.

Today, the income of individual reindeer herders consists of the production of meat and raw materials such as skins, bones and horns. Additional sources of income include financial subsidies and compensation.

More than 50% of the costs in the industry in all the six areas of reindeer husbandry are related to the costs of running and maintaining mechanical equipment. Other high costs are related to other equipment and constructions.

Norway has since 1976, an agreement for reindeer husbandry which is called the Reindeer Husbandry Agreement (Norwegian: Reindriftsavtalen) and the main purpose of this is to preserve and develop reindeer husbandry based on its traditions. The agreement is a result of the Norwegian authorities’ views on reindeer herding and especially in relation to the support of the Sámi culture and reindeer husbandry as a Sámi industry. The agreement reflects the political objectives and guidelines for reindeer husbandry.

The economic support for the years 2008–2009 amounted to 97 million NOK (10.1 M Euro). The financial support agreement includes activity supports, production bonuses, early slaughter supplements, calf slaughter payments, district support, special transition assistance and other payments.

==== Sweden ====
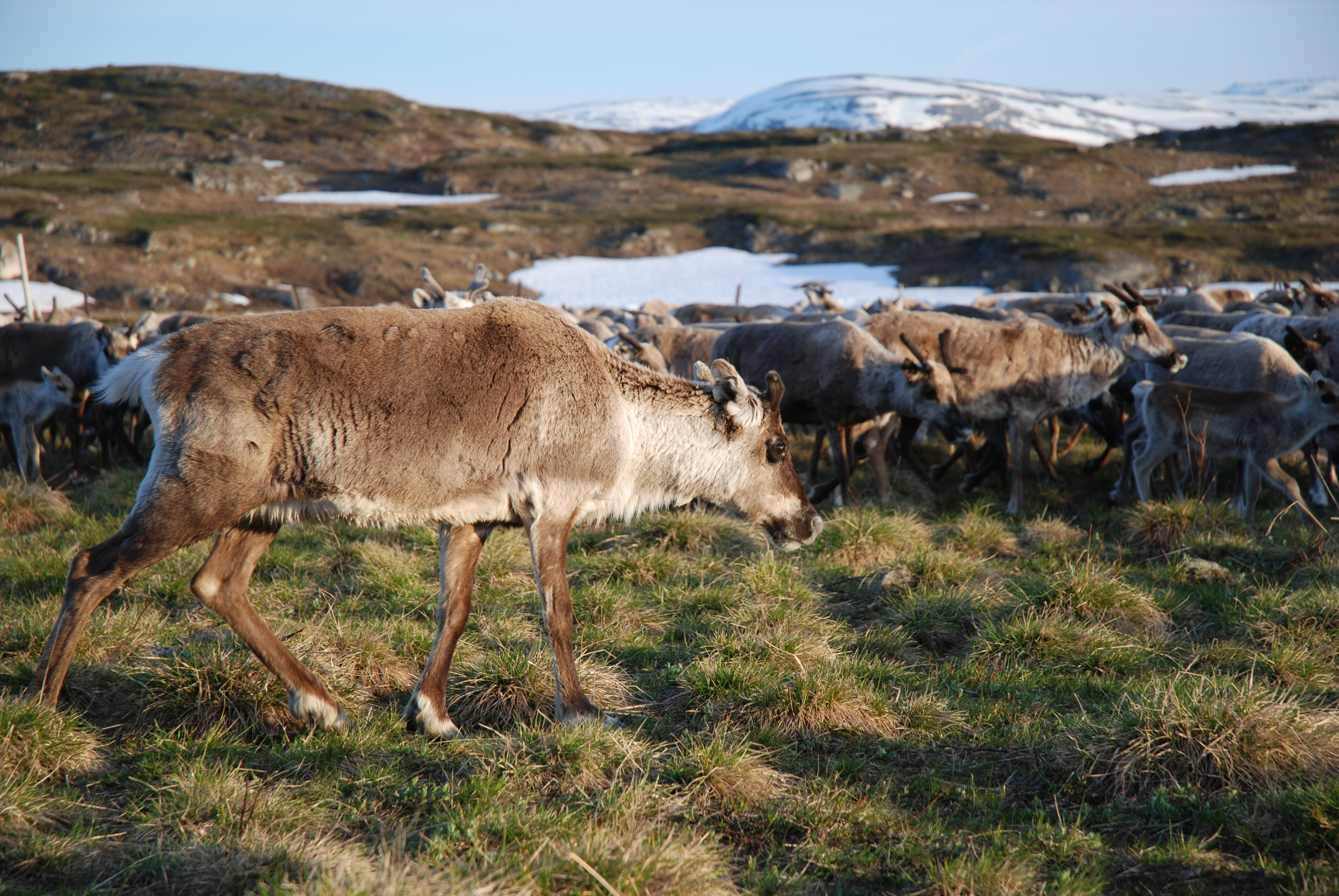
Reindeer calf marking, Gabna Sámi village in northern Sweden

In Sweden, reindeer herding is practised widely in the provinces of Norrbotten, Västerbotten, and Jämtland, and in parts of the provinces of Dalarna, Västernorrland, and Gävleborg. The herding area stretches from the border with Finland to the province of Dalarna, covering an area of 226 000 km^{2} , or about 55% of Sweden.

Reindeer herding employs about 2,500 people in Sweden and the number of reindeer owners is a total of about 4,600 people. According to figures from 2005, 77% of the country's reindeer are owned by men.

The Sámi village (Sámi: siida, Swedish: sameby), the structural unit of Sámi reindeer herding in Sweden, is divided into 51 Sámi reindeer herding villages which are both economic associations and geographical areas. Of those are 33 mountain and 10 forest Sámi reindeer herding villages, and eight concession Sámi reindeer herding villages.

Contemporary reindeer husbandry is regulated by the Swedish reindeer husbandry act. According to this Act, the right to pursue reindeer herding only belongs to the Sámi people. Only a person who is member of Sámi reindeer herding village (Sameby) has reindeer herding rights, in other words, may engage in reindeer husbandry in the Sámi reindeer herding village to which they belong. The only exception are concession villages, as they engage in reindeer husbandry with special permission from the County Administrative Board (in Swedish: Länsstyrelsen). The reindeer in the concession villages are owned by non-Sámi who also often own the land on which their reindeer graze. However, according to the Reindeer Husbandry Act, the actual reindeer herding in a concession village must be conducted by a Sámi. A reindeer owner in a concession village is not allowed to own more than 30 reindeer. Concession villages exist only in the Torne Valley, the border region with Finland.

Any reindeer has to be marked in the ears. A reindeer earmark is a combination of one to many cuts in a reindeer's ears which all together tells who the reindeer owner is. There are around 20 different approved cuts and in addition some 30 different combinations of cuts, and all those cuts and combinations have their own name. All reindeer in the Sámi reindeer husbandry area are marked with the owner's registered earmark by 31 October in the year of its birth. Before an earmark is implemented, it must be approved by the earmark committee consisting of three to five members.

The number of reindeer in Sweden fluctuates and during the 1900s it has varied between 150,000 and 300,000 reindeer. In Sweden the reindeer numbers were 253,000 in 1995, 221,000 in 2000 and 220,000 in 2007. The number of reindeer is counted after slaughtered reindeer are withdrawn from the herd, and before the calving starts, which is usually in May. For each Sámi village, the maximum number of reindeer is decided by the County Administrative Board and the reindeer are counted each year by the reindeer herders themselves. On the individual level there are no maximum numbers for reindeer.

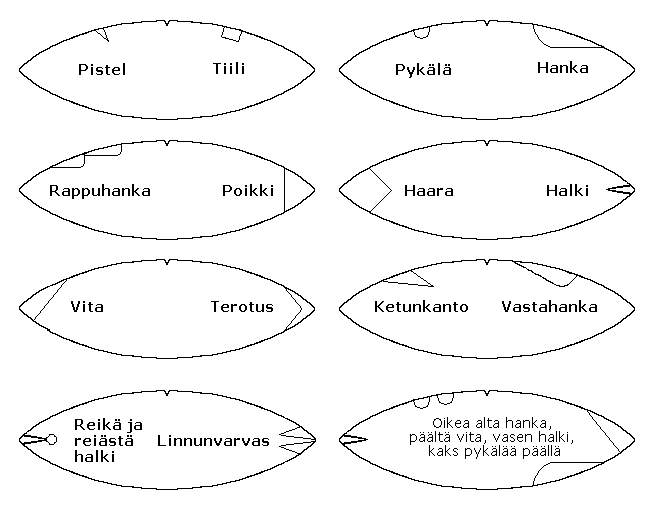
Basic ear marks for marking Finnish reindeer

=== Finland ===
In Finland, reindeer husbandry is practiced through a system of reindeer herding districts (in Finnish: paliskunta, Sámi: bálgosat). There are 56 districts in the reindeer husbandry area, 41 of which are in Lapland and the remaining 15 are in Northern Ostrobothnia and Kainuu.

13 of the districts are so-called Sámi districts. The districts have strictly defined boundaries and they vary in size and number of reindeer.

The total area of reindeer husbandry in Finland is approximately 33% of the surface of the country or about 122,936 km^{2}.

Reindeer herding in Finland is not the prerogative of only ethnic Sámi, and any European Union citizen can engage in this type of farm. However, there are some conditions. The owner of the reindeer must be approved as a member by a reindeer herding district (Finnish: paliskunta, Swedish: renbeteslag, Sámi: bálggos) and must permanently reside in the municipality to which the district belongs.

In total, there are about 5,600 reindeer herders, most of whom are Finnish by nationality. The number of reindeer owners in Finland is about 6,700.

In the beginning of the 20th century, the number of reindeer in Finland was slightly over 100,000, and by 1959–1960 it had reached 140,000. During the 1970s and 1980s the number increased rapidly and reached over 250,000 reindeer at a maximum. The number of reindeer in Finland was about 207,000 reindeer in 2004/2005. The Ministry of Agriculture and Forestry (Finnish: Maa- ja metsätalousministeriö) regulates the number of reindeer by confirming the largest permissible numbers of living reindeer for each district. If the number of reindeer in a district exceeds the permitted level, the district must reduce the number of its reindeer to below the largest permissible number.

The largest permissible number of reindeer owned by a reindeer husbandry entrepreneur is 300 animals in the southern region of the reindeer husbandry area and 500 animals in the northern parts of the area.

In Finland, reindeer husbandry at the individual level in terms of taxation is not treated as a for-profit-business. Instead the reindeer herding district serves as a joint company for the reindeer owners. The district reports all incomes and costs within the district.

The vast majority of reindeer owners in Finland practise reindeer husbandry as a supplement to agriculture and forestry. With regard to ethnic groups in Finland, reindeer herding is from the economic point of view the most important for Sámi people. The annual total revenue from reindeer husbandry in Finland is estimated to be 60 million Euro with the main product being meat. In 1999–2000, 93,000 reindeer were slaughtered, producing 2.1 million kilograms of meat.

In addition to meat production, reindeer are also an extremely valuable resource for both summer and winter tourism, as they are one of the main attractions for foreign tourists. Numbers from 1994 to 2000 show that 60-80% of reindeer herders' income is from meat and about 10% from compensation and 10% from aid. Only a small part comes from investments and other incomes. Numbers from the same years show that about 40% of the costs are related to herding activities, about 20% of costs to cross country traffic and the rest to damages caused by reindeer, administrative costs, office supplies and equipment and other utilities.

=== Russia ===
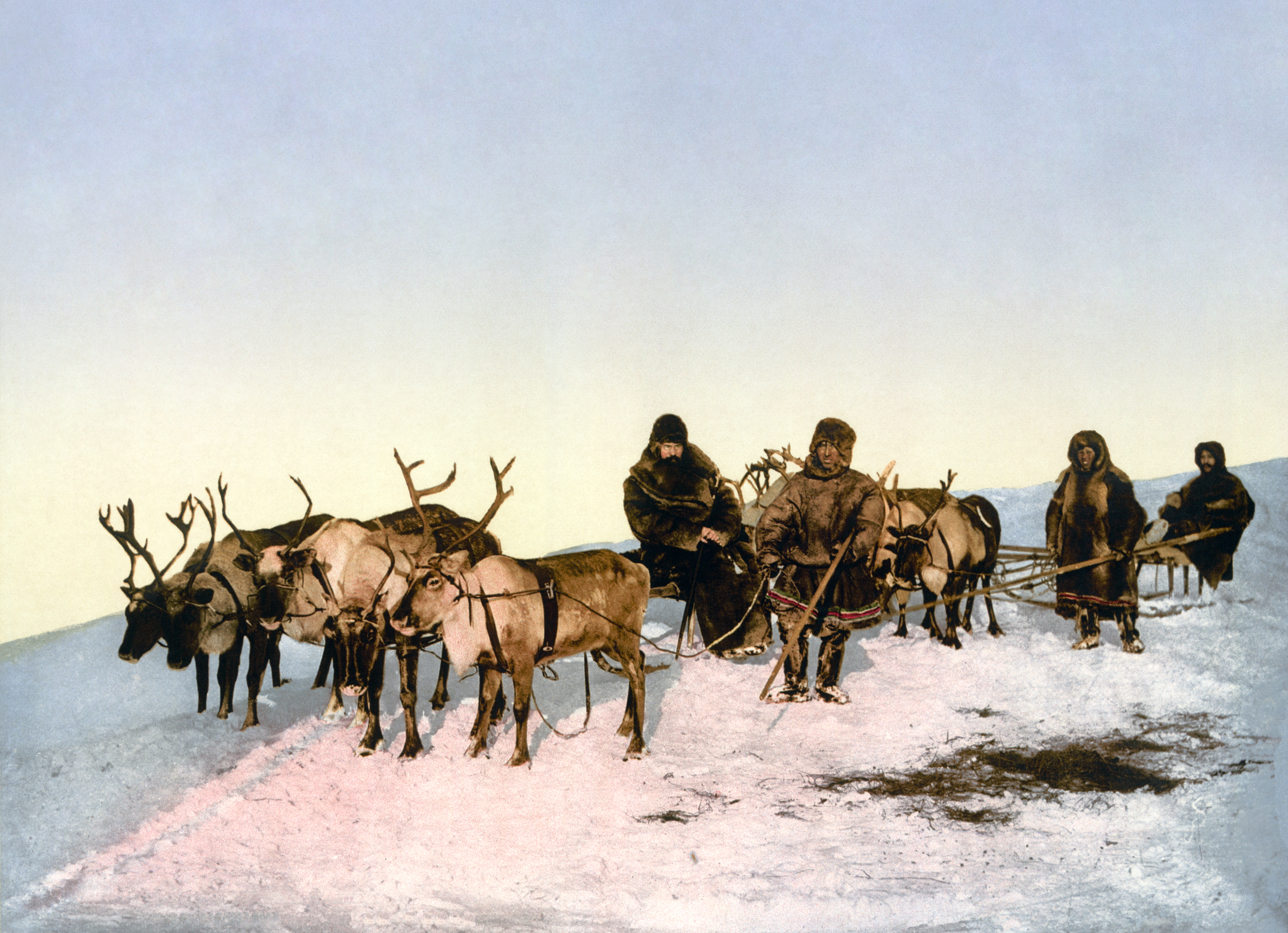
Archangel reindeer

Reindeer breeding of the Kola Sámi in the northwest of Russia underwent a transformation in the 19th century with the arrival of 65 Komi reindeer herders with their 600 deer. Reindeer herding on the basis of semi-grazing was transformed into large-scale farms with a focus on productivity. Collectivization in the 1930s continued the further transformation of reindeer husbandry as the size of the herds increased. After the collapse of the Soviet Union, reindeer husbandry was neglected. Reindeer husbandry is managed by two state farms and reindeer herders are hired workers of these farms, as in the Soviet period.

In total, about 200 people are employed in Sámi reindeer herding, still mostly Komi by nationality. The remaining smaller part of reindeer herders are Sámi, Russians and Ukrainians. Nowadays in Russia about 1,555,300 reindeer graze. The share of private property in reindeer husbandry in the last decade has grown significantly.

== Evenki ==
Evenki are the most widespread of the Tungus speaking people and can be found in various regions of the Russian Federation: through the Lower Yenisey valley through the Evenk Autonomous Okrug, Irkutskaya and Amur Oblast to Khabarovsk Krai, Buryatia, North-West and South Sakha (Yakutia); they also live in China and a small group in Mongolia. Their number is probably 50,000 people, most of whom live on the territory of the Republic of Sakha (Yakutia), a federal subject of the Russian Federation. Being traditional nomads, they practice traditional types of economy, including reindeer herding and hunting.

=== Russia ===
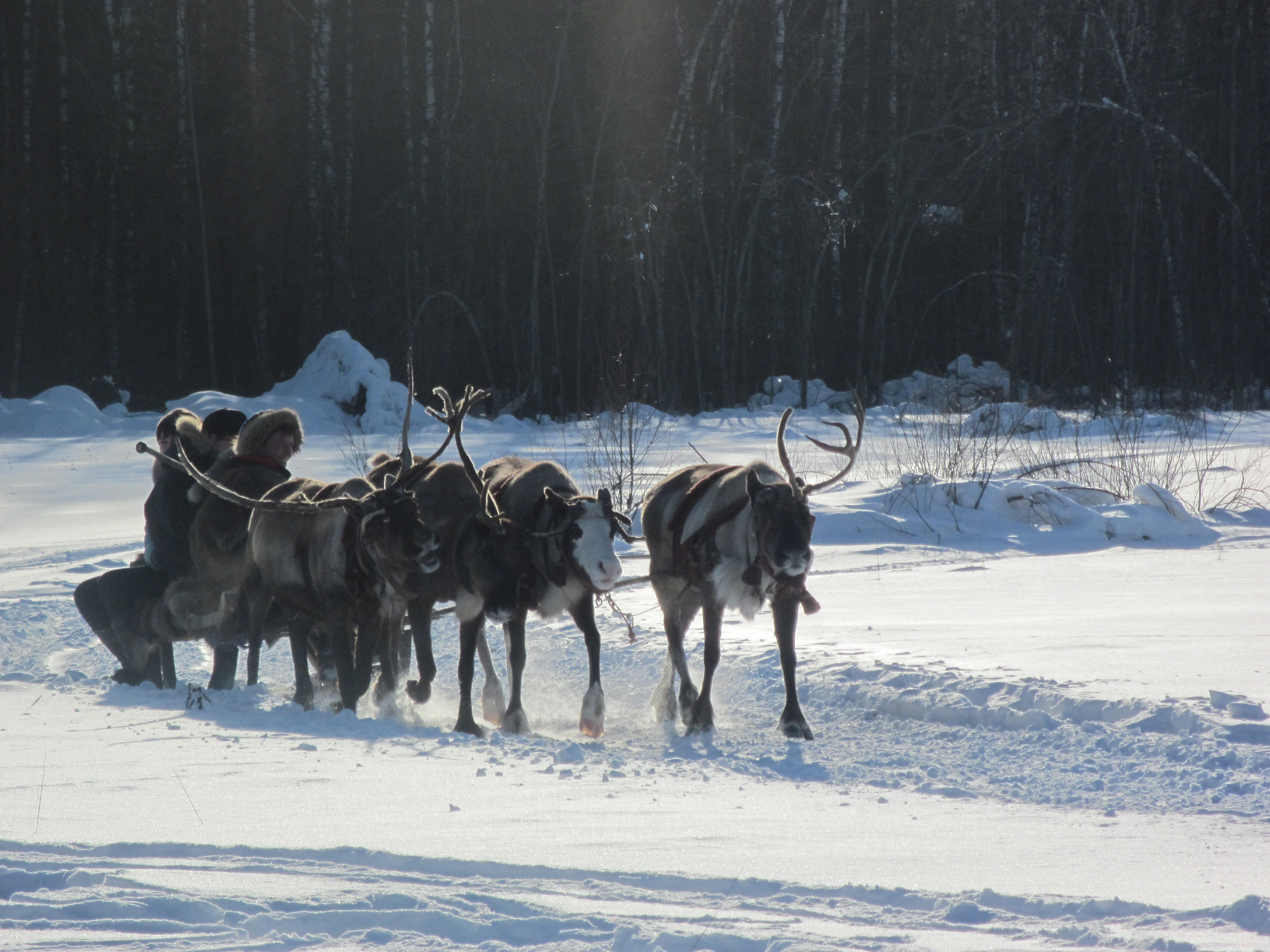
Reindeer pulling a sleigh, Russia

Summer pastures are located on watershed areas (drainage divides), while winter pastures are located in river basins. Hunting for wild deer has traditionally served as a by-catch for reindeer herders and was conducted seasonally by small groups of hunters in river crossings. Nomadism is of key importance to the Evenk culture. As a result of Soviet collectivization, nomads were forcibly made sedentary, which resulted in the disintegration of social structures and cultural identities. Deer are used for riding and transporting loads and are grazed without dogs. Modern vehicles only partially replaced deer. Evenk reindeer herding serves as a model for small-scale reindeer herding where deer are used as vehicles for milk production.

Traditionally, the number of deer varied from several head to two or three dozen head per family. Relations with the deer were close, deer were saddled and milked, and the process of domestication continued through the use of millennial techniques, such as the use of salt, smoke to control insects and protection from predators. Evenk reindeer herding is closely connected with the Sayan reindeer herding (Todzhans, Tofalars, Czataans). On the reindeer Evenks traveled along the whole Eastern Siberia, spread out on 7 million square kilometers. As a result, there are about 20 clearly defined Evenk subgroups, and reindeer herding has become an important indicator of the Evenk identity.

The industrial development of certain parts of Siberia had catastrophic consequences for some groups of Evenks, and recently this process is gaining momentum due to accelerated extraction of minerals, construction of pipelines and development of the timber industry complex. The fate of the Evenk reindeer herders in the Upper Bureysky District of the Amur Oblast serves as a reminder that reindeer husbandry in these regions may come to an end.

=== China ===
Reindeer husbandry in China is limited to the territory of one small area in the northeast of the country between 50° and 53° N. Currently 234 Evenk are employed in reindeer husbandry, distributed among 20 families, and about 1,000 deer grazing. These Evenk reindeer herders are what remained of the once large group of Evenk hunters who freely crossed the Russian-Chinese border. When military operations broke out on the Soviet-Chinese border in the 1960s, this group found itself in the territory of China. Intending to put an end to free migration across the state border, the Chinese authorities moved these people deep into the country: first to Alonsohn, then to Monkey, and finally to the settlement of Alougoya. The deer were collectivized in 1967. The state bought out all deer from the reindeer herders and began to pay the shepherds wages despite the fact that the deer continued to be under the care of their former owners and shepherds. Grazing of these deer is comparable to that of other peoples in the south of Siberia: The small number of reindeer that were owned by the families were milked and used as a means of transport. Deer were highly valued and were not slaughtered for meat.

Improving the health status and diversity of the herd, as well as the economic situation of reindeer herders, are the top priorities for this region. The production of antlers for marketing on the Asian pharmacological market is the main source of income, and attempts are being made to develop small-scale tourism in the tribal communities located near the largest city in the region, Genhe.

=== Mongolia ===
The Tsaatan people live in the remote, deep forest of northern Mongolia. They are one of the few remaining tribes of their kind left as modern development makes its way into their remote area; their ancient traditions are now at risk of dying out. Nowadays, there is a little income in the Tsaatan communities because of tourism in Mongolia.

== Threats to the practice ==
Modern reindeer herding is currently facing challenges that make the practice more difficult and dangerous. One such challenge is the impacts that climate change has on reindeer and reindeer herding. Longer and warmer growing seasons brought on by climate change increase vegetation cover in areas where reindeer live, reducing biodiversity and the overall nutritional value of plants available for reindeer to eat. Longer and warmer growing seasons also decrease the amount of lichens, which are a preferred plant for reindeer. With increased precipitation also caused by climate change, there is often an increase in ice cover, which reduces the growth, diversity, and accessibility of vegetation. Additionally, warmer conditions delay the full freeze of lakes and rivers in reindeer herding areas, increasing the risk of reindeers falling through the ice and drowning. All of these factors lead to increased reindeer deaths and make it more difficult for herders to keep their reindeer healthy. It can also have a large economic impact on herders, as in some cases they may need to supplement-feed their reindeer. They may also be required to spend more time and effort to keep herds together and away from dangerous conditions. Climate change makes the practice increasingly dangerous for herders as well, with unpredictable weather and ice conditions creating more dangerous situations and causing herders to be less able to rely on their traditional and ecological knowledge.

Reindeer herding is also affected by human presence in herding areas. Logging of forests, extractive industries, and an increased military presence in certain areas are shrinking grazing lands and food sources available for reindeer herding.

Another threat to the practice of reindeer herding is renewable energy companies, whose implementation of wind power, mineral extraction, and hydropower has led to accusations of infringement on the rights of Indigenous communities such as the Sámi. This green industry has resulted in land dispossession, obstruction of reindeer migration routes, and degradation and fragmentation of reindeer grazing land. Wind power is especially destructive to reindeer herding. Reindeer herders have reported strong negative effects on reindeer in areas where turbines are visible, with reindeer changing their migration patterns in order to avoid the turbines. In turn, herders are required to increase their herding activity to keep reindeer grazing in appropriate areas, and traditional herding activities often must change in order to adapt to new habitat use and movement patterns.

== List of individual reindeer herders ==
- Berit Marie Eira
- Lars Hætta
- Vieno Länsman
- Donny Olson
- Tiina Sanila-Aikio
- Ellen Aslaksdatter Skum
- Lene Cecilia Sparrok
- Kristine Andersen Vesterfjell

== Other reindeer herders ==
Besides Sámi and Evenk reindeer herders there are also Yakut, Nenets, Chukchi, Finnish, Komi, Koryak, Khanty, Mansi, Dolgan, Dukha, Enets, Yukagir, Tozha Tuvans, Tofalar, Selkup, Nganasan, Scottish and Greenlandic herders, Chuvan, Inupiaq Eskimo, Inuvialuit, Uil’ta, Kets, Negidal and Soyot.

== In culture ==
Aatsinki: The Story of Arctic Cowboys is a 2013 documentary about Finnish reindeer herders.
