= Waldemar Hvoslef =

Norwegian bishop (1825–1906)

The Right Reverend Fredrik Waldemar Hvoslef
- Bishop of Bjørgvin
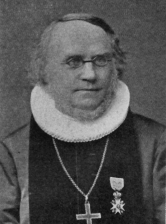
- Church: Church of Norway
- Diocese: Tromsø stift (1868–1875); Bjørgvin (1881–1898)

Personal details
- Born: 17 March 1825 Christiania, Norway
- Died: 5 May 1906 (aged 81) Bergen, Norway
- Denomination: Lutheran
- Spouse: Alette Kathrine Frost
- Occupation: Priest

Waldemar Hvoslef (17 March 1825 – 5 May 1906) was a Norwegian Lutheran bishop.

Fredrik Waldemar Hvoslef was born in Christiania (now Oslo) and grew up in Holmestrand in Jarlsberg og Laurvig county. He was the son of Jens Hvoslef (1783–1830) who served as Magistrate of Nordre Jarlsberg, now part of Vestfold county. He began to study theology during 1850.

Hvoslef arrived in Kautokeino Municipality in Finnmark to serve as minister at the time of the Kautokeino Uprising in 1852. During that event two men, the local sheriff and the tradesman, were killed, while Hvoslef was attacked. The rebels were later seized by other Sami, who killed two of the rebels in the process. Hvoslef later served as pastor for the convicted Mons Somby and Aslak Hætta at their execution in 1854.

He was appointed Bishop of Tromsø stift in 1868. In 1881 he was appointed Bishop of the Diocese of Bjørgvin, and served in this position until his retirement in 1898.

He was married to Alette Katrine Frost (1826–1902) with whom he had nine children.

== See also ==
- The Kautokeino Rebellion
- Laestadianism

Church of Norway titles
Preceded by Carl Peter Parelius Essendrop	Bishop of Tromsø stift 1868–1875	Succeeded by Jakob Sverdrup Smitt
Preceded by Peter Hersleb Graah Birkeland	Bishop of Bjørgvin; 1881–1898	Succeeded by Johan Willoch Erichsen
