= Utsi =

Utsi is a surname of Sami origin. People with that name include:

- Inger Elin Utsi (born 1975), Sami politician and actor
- Nils Utsi (born 1943), Sami actor and director
- Per A. Utsi (born 1939), Sami politician
- Oda Utsi Onstad (born 1990), Norwegian long and triple jumper

== See also ==
- UTSI, University of Tennessee Space Institute
