= Lars Hætta =

Norwegian Sami reindeer herder

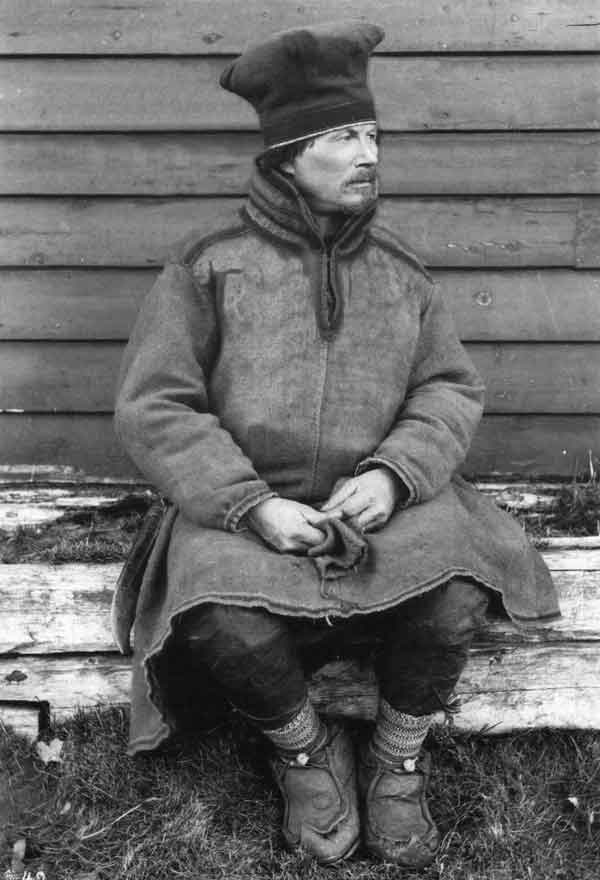
Lars Hætta

Lars Hætta (Northern Sami: Jáhkoš-Lasse; 21 January 1834 – 17 February 1896) was a Norwegian Sami reindeer herder, prisoner, wood carver and Bible translator. Following the Sami revolt in Guovdageaidnu in 1852 he received a death sentence, which was commuted to life imprisonment.

== Personal life ==
Hætta was born in Kautokeino Municipality in Finnmark, the son of Jacob Mathisen Hætta and Berit Aslaksdatter Sara. He was the brother of Aslak Hætta, and married Berit Hansdatter Gaup in 1868.

== Guovdageaidnu revolt ==
In Finnmark the preaching of Lars Levi Læstadius had attracted many supporters to his religious movement. These were in opposition to the established society. In 1852 a major conflict took place: a group of about 30 men and women marched to the centre of Guovdageaidnu to seek revenge for previous harassment. The sheriff, Lars Johan Bucht, and local tradesman Carl Johan Ruth were both killed; while the priest (later bishop) Waldemar Hvoslef, along with his family and household, were whipped by the mob. A rescue party eventually arrived and a fierce fight followed, during which the Læstadian community was overpowered and two of the sect members died. Five of the rebels were later sentenced to death, including Lars Hætta. Two of these, Lars' brother Aslak and Mons Somby, were beheaded in November 1854. Lars Hætta was reprieved by King Oscar I because of his young age. Ellen Skum and her brother Henrik were also reprieved.

== Later life ==
While imprisoned at the Akershus Prison, Hætta started translating the Bible into the Northern Sami language, in cooperation with professor Jens Andreas Friis. After his release from prison in 1867, he joined Friis and Ludvig Kristensen Daa on a scientific excursion, married in 1868, settled in Guovdageaidnu, and continued his translation work. The translated New Testament was finished in 1869 and published in 1874. The translated complete Bible was printed in 1895. Hætta also contributed to the dictionary Ordbog for det lappiske Sprog, and translated other books into Sami language. Several of his wood sculptures from Sami tradition are now located at the Norsk Folkemuseum.
