= Give Us Our Skeletons =

- Directed by: Paul-Anders Simma
- Starring: Niillas Somby
- Distributed by: Icarus Films
- Release date: 1999
- Running time: 49 minutes
- Country: Norway
- Languages: Sámi, Norwegian and English, with English subtitles.

Give Us Our Skeletons! (Antakaa Meille Luurankomme (Finnish); Oaivveskaldjut (Northern Sami) is a 1999 documentary film directed by Paul-Anders Simma about Niillas Somby, a Sámi man who retraces his family ancestry as he searches for the head of his ancestor, Mons Somby.

Mons Aslaksen Somby and Aslak Jakobsen Hætta were executed by decapitation on 14 October 1854 for murder, following the 1852 Kautokeino rebellion against the local Norwegian government in which two people were murdered. Their heads were claimed by the government for scientific research, and were held as part of a collection of 900 skulls at the Anatomical Institute of the University of Oslo.

The movie describes three parallel plots; the first is Niillas Somby's story on how he became one of the most celebrated protesters during the Alta Dam Protests between 1979 and 1981 near Kautokeino Municipality, Norway. In the years that followed, he traveled in exile to Canada where he was given sanctuary by the Iroquois First Nation, and later returned to Norway.

The second plot was the disturbing examination of the scientific racism and racial classification movement that was considered an accepted fact by Scandinavian scientists from the early 19th century until the 1950s. This included the plundering of Sámi graves for their skeletons and the forced sterilization of the Sámi and other peoples in Scandinavia who were viewed as competing with the "noble races", as part of a larger eugenics program.

The third and final plot was Niillas Somby's emotional struggle with bringing Mons Somby's skull home for a proper burial.
