= Pathfinder (2007 film) =

2007 historical action film by Marcus Nispel

- Promotional poster
- Directed by: Marcus Nispel
- Written by: Laeta Kalogridis
- Based on: Pathfinder (1987 film) by Nils Gaup
- Produced by: Mike Medavoy; Arnold W. Messer; Marcus Nispel
- Starring: Karl Urban; Moon Bloodgood; Russell Means; Ralf Möller; Clancy Brown
- Cinematography: Daniel Pearl
- Edited by: Jay Friedkin; Glen Scantlebury
- Music by: Jonathan Elias; Tim Davies
- Production company: Phoenix Pictures
- Distributed by: 20th Century Fox
- Release date: April 13, 2007
- Running time: 99 minutes
- Country: United States
- Languages: English; Icelandic
- Budget: $45 million
- Box office: $30.8 million

Pathfinder (sometimes subtitled Legend of the Ghost Warrior) is a 2007 American historical action film directed and co-produced by Marcus Nispel, written by Laeta Kalogridis, and starring Karl Urban, Moon Bloodgood, Russell Means, Ralf Moeller and Clancy Brown.

Loosely based on the 1987 Norwegian film Pathfinder, the film is set in the Viking Age, during the Norse colonization of North America. It follows a Norse man named Ghost, who was adopted by local Skrælings (Native Americans) as a boy and becomes a warrior for the tribe.

The film was released in the United States by 20th Century Fox on April 13, 2007. It was poorly received and was a commercial failure, grossing $30.8 million on a budget of $45 million; it managed another estimated $28 million in DVD sales.Pathfinder was also adapted into a graphic novel by Dark Horse Comics, which was released over a year before the film was released theatrically.

== Plot ==
A Viking Age expedition arrives in North America, intending to subjugate or slaughter the native "Skræling" population. The party is itself wiped out by another native tribe, the only survivor being the Viking leader's son, who is adopted by a native woman. The boy is taken in by the local tribe and named "Ghost" for his paleness.

Fifteen years later, Ghost still lives among the tribe. Though he is socially accepted, he has yet to earn the status of a warrior. His romantic interest is Starfire, the daughter of the Pathfinder, an elderly chief of a neighboring tribe. The only remembrance he keeps of his heritage is his father's sword.

In an attack by a new group of Viking raiders, Ghost's village is destroyed and all of its inhabitants are killed, except a few tribesmen whom the attackers force into single combat. Viking leader Gunnar challenges Ghost, who is still in possession of his father's sword. He defeats Ulfar, Gunnar's second-in-command by cutting out his eye before escaping.

Ghost is pursued by the Vikings and receives an arrow wound. He reaches the neighboring tribe and is tended to by Pathfinder and his daughter. Ghost advises the villagers to flee and departs to take on the Vikings alone. He is joined by Jester, a mute admirer who refuses to leave his side and Starfire, who leaves the tribe for him. They defeat a few Vikings and collect their arms and armor. Pathfinder goes after his daughter and joins the fight. Eventually, both Jester and Pathfinder are executed brutally, and Ghost and Starfire are captured. The Vikings threaten to torture Starfire if Ghost will not betray the location of the other villages.

Ghost intentionally takes the Vikings to the dangerous mountain cliff which is the only way to reach one of the villages. During the journey, one of the Vikings falls to his death and Ghost suggests they tie each other off for safety. As they reach the open mountain leading to the village, Ghost tells Starfire to hit him, which makes Gunnar think Ghost needs to prove himself by beating up Starfire. Suddenlyost uses a slingshot to shoot a small rock at a Viking, making him lose balance and causing the rest of the Vikings to fall off the cliff.

Gunnar tries to kill Ghost, but Ghost pushes him off the cliff. While Ghost and Starfire try to cut off the rope, Gunnar clings to the mountain, sacrificing Ulfar to save himself. Ghost fatally wounds Gunnar in a fight, and throws him off the cliff to his death.

Ghost returns to Starfire with Pathfinder's necklace, thus making Starfire the new Pathfinder after her father. Now finally respected as the bravest of the tribe and one of their own, Ghost assumes his position watching over the coast if the Vikings ever return.

== Cast ==
- Karl Urban as Ghost, Starfire's love interest
- Moon Bloodgood as Starfire, the new chieftain of the native tribe, Ghost's love interest and Pathfinder's daughter
- Clancy Brown as Gunnar, the Viking leader
- Ralf Moeller as Ulfar, Gunnar's second-in-command
- Russell Means as Pathfinder, the chief of the native tribe and Starfire's father
- Nathaniel Arcand as Wind in Tree
- Jay Tavare as Blackwing
- Kevin Loring as Jester, a mute admirer of the native tribe
- Duane Howard as Elder

== Unrated version ==
For the theatrical release and the initial DVD release, director Marcus Nispel had been forced to cut the gore and digitally remove some of the extreme violence out of at least 32 scenes, and also a scene of Ghost and Starfire making love in a cave, so that the film could gain an R rating from the MPAA. Nispel was also forced to trim down 23 scenes (including significant plot development) for reasons of time and pacing. In total around ten minutes were cut out of the film. These cuts were restored however, as well as the gore, for the unrated version, which was released on July 31, 2007.

== Reception ==
=== Critical reception ===
The film was poorly received, with a 8% approval rating on Rotten Tomatoes based on 75 reviews, with an average rating of 3.70/10. The site's critical consensus reads: "A few rousing action sequences can't make up for Pathfinder's non-existent plot and silly dialogue." On Metacritic, the film has a score of 29 out of 100, based on 23 reviews, indicating "generally unfavorable reviews". Audiences polled by CinemaScore gave the film an average grade of "C–" on an A+ to F scale.

A review on the BBC website gave the film two out of five stars, stating, "...this Norse saga plays like a 100 minute trailer; there's no character development, no real plot, just a string of high-concept action sequences... ...director Marcus Nispel [a veteran director of music videos] helms it like it's a nu-metal video: swirling dry ice, thundering Dolby sound effects, and oversized Vikings who look like WWF wrestlers. Metalheads will be in Valhalla; everyone else should find a different path." Peter Debruge of Variety wrote, "This latest bit of historical balder-dash stands in direct defiance of proven action-movie formulas, trusting its brutal concept and striking visuals to overcome a lack of star power". Manohla Dargis of The New York Times wrote, "All grunting, all goring, the witless action flick "Pathfinder" has little to recommend it". Michael Ordona of the Los Angeles Times called it unintentionally funny, and Mick LaSalle of the San Francisco Chronicle called it a failed attempt to make an art-house film out of a concept better suited to an exploitation film.

Among the more positive reviews, Kirk Honeycutt of The Hollywood Reporter stated that the film "nicely balances action and adventure with American Indian wisdom and a modest romance to provide a graphic-comic-book movie experience for males in urban markets". Wesley Morris of The Boston Globe praised the "grueling action sequences", granting that the filmmakers "choreograph some excitement" in two scenes "in a 99-minute adventure that feels longer than that".

=== Box office ===
Pathfinder opened theatrically in the United States on April 13, 2007, in sixth place on its opening weekend and had some big competition at the box office with 300, Blades of Glory, and Disturbia amongst others, and although Pathfinder earned more than $5 million in its opening weekend at the box office, this quickly tailed off. Overall, the film earned approximately $30.9 million at the worldwide box office, failing to recoup its $45 million budget. The film would eventually earn nearly as much back through DVD sales.

== Home media ==
The film was released on DVD on July 31, 2007, and on Blu-ray on November 20, 2007. Nearly a million and a half DVDs of the film were sold in the United States, for an estimated $28,475,483 from the DVD sales.

== Graphic novel ==
The film was also adapted into a graphic novel by Dark Horse Comics. The graphic novel was built around dialogue written by the film screenwriter Laeta Kalogridis and with art by comic book artist Christopher Shy. It was subsequently published by Dark Horse Comics at the same time as the film. From the beginning the graphic novel had a symbiotic relationship with the film. Film director Marcus Nispel, also a graphic novelist, decided to adapt the screenplay into a comic book format to appeal to his target audience more and help get a fan base to get his film made. However, his film got the green light before the graphic novel could be completed.

== See also ==
- Pathfinder (1987 film)
