= The Minister of State =

1997 film

- Original Swedish film poster
- Directed by: Paul-Anders Simma
- Written by: Paul-Anders Simma
- Produced by: Bert Sundberg
- Starring: Anna Maria Blind
- Cinematography: Hans Welin
- Release dates: 25 January 1997 (Norway); 9 March 1997 (Finland); 30 May 1997 (Sweden)
- Running time: 85 minutes
- Countries: Finland; Norway; Sweden
- Languages: Finnish; Norwegian; Swedish; Northern Sámi

The Minister of State (Finnish: Sagojogan ministeri, Swedish: Ministern från Sagojoga or Minister på villovägar, Norwegian: Stol på ministeren!) is a 1997 Nordic comedy film directed by Paul-Anders Simma. It was entered into the 20th Moscow International Film Festival.

== Cast ==
- Anna Maria Blind as Anne-Marja
- Mikkel Gaup as Ante
- Peo Grape as Evil Erkki
- Rolf Jenner as Cruel Gustu
- Erik Kiviniemi as Seppo Rävmark
- Peter Kneip as German Officer
- Soli Labbart as Thin Anna
- Esko Nikkari as Judge
- Sara Margrethe Oskal as Marit Jaha
- Sverre Porsanger as Johan Jaha
- Wimme Saari as Jojken
- Iisko Sara as Angry Piette
- Anitta Suikkari as Mrs. Neia
- Bjørn Sundquist as Antti Neia
- Kari-Pekka Toivonen as Otto Swinskjöld
