= Nils Utsi =

Norwegian Sámi actor, stage director, and film director (1943–2019)

Nils Reidar Utsi
- Born: 22 July 1943; Tana, Norway
- Died: 1 January 2019 (aged 75)
- Occupations: Actor; Film and stage director

Nils Reidar Utsi (22 July 1943 – 1 January 2019) was a Norwegian Sámi actor, stage director and film director.

== Biography ==
He worked for the theatres Den Nationale Scene in Bergen, Hålogaland Teater, which he also cofounded, and Beaivváš Sámi Našunálateáhter, where he staged his first play, an adaptation of Stones in His Pockets. He co-directed the television series Ante from 1975, and also participated as actor. The series treated the situation of indigenous peoples through the Sami boy "Ante", and was sold to 23 countries.

Utsi played the character Raste in the 1987 Nils Gaup awarded film Ofelaš (Pathfinder).

Utsi died on 1 January 2019, at the age of 75.

== Filmography ==
Year	Title	Role	Notes
1974	Under en steinhimmel	Byorginalen	
1976	Ante	Ante's father	
1980	Svart hav	Sønnen	
1980	La elva leve!	Ole Raino	
1983	Jon	Raineri - fisherman	
1986	Nattseilere	Karel	
1987	Pathfinder	Raste	
2003	Bázo	Birger	
2008	The Kautokeino Rebellion	Clemet	
2009	Jernanger	Ivar	
2010	Robert Mitchum est mort	Sarrineff	
2012	Dunderland	Ailo	
2014	Skumringslandet	Finnjerv	
2017	The 12th Man	Eldre Same	
2019	Askeladden - I Soria Moria slott	Sea Dog	(final film role)
