= Paul-Anders Simma =

Finnish film director

- Born: 27 September 1959 (age 66); Karesuvanto, Finland
- Occupations: Film director Screenwriter
- Years active: 1992-present

Paul-Anders Simma (born 27 September 1959) is a Finnish Sámi film director and screenwriter. His 1997 film The Minister of State was entered into the 20th Moscow International Film Festival.

After the Norwegian Nils Gaup’s film Pathfinder (1987) was the first Sámi full-length movie, Simma’s film The Minister of State (1997) was the second. After this, more full-length movies in Sámi languages haven’t been completed. The Minister of State is a comedy about an outlaw arriving to a small village in the meeting point of Norway, Sweden and Finland. People mistake him for a minister of the Finnish government. The man uses the mistake in order to gain trust from the villagers.

== Selected filmography ==
- The Minister of State (1997)
- Give Us Our Skeletons (1999)
