= Vieno Länsman =

Sami politician and reindeer herder (died 2024)

Member of the Sámi Parliament of Finland
- In office 2003–2007

Personal details
- Died: 26 January 2024
- Occupation: Reindeer herder

Vieno Tellervo Länsman (died 26 January 2024) was a Sami politician and reindeer herder from Finland. She was a member of the Sami Parliament of Finland from 2003 to 2007. Länsman was the first woman to be elected the chairperson of a cooperative of reindeer herdsmen in Finland, when she was elected chair of the Kaldoaivi reindeer herding cooperative.
