= Mikkel Gaup =

Sámi Norwegian film and stage actor

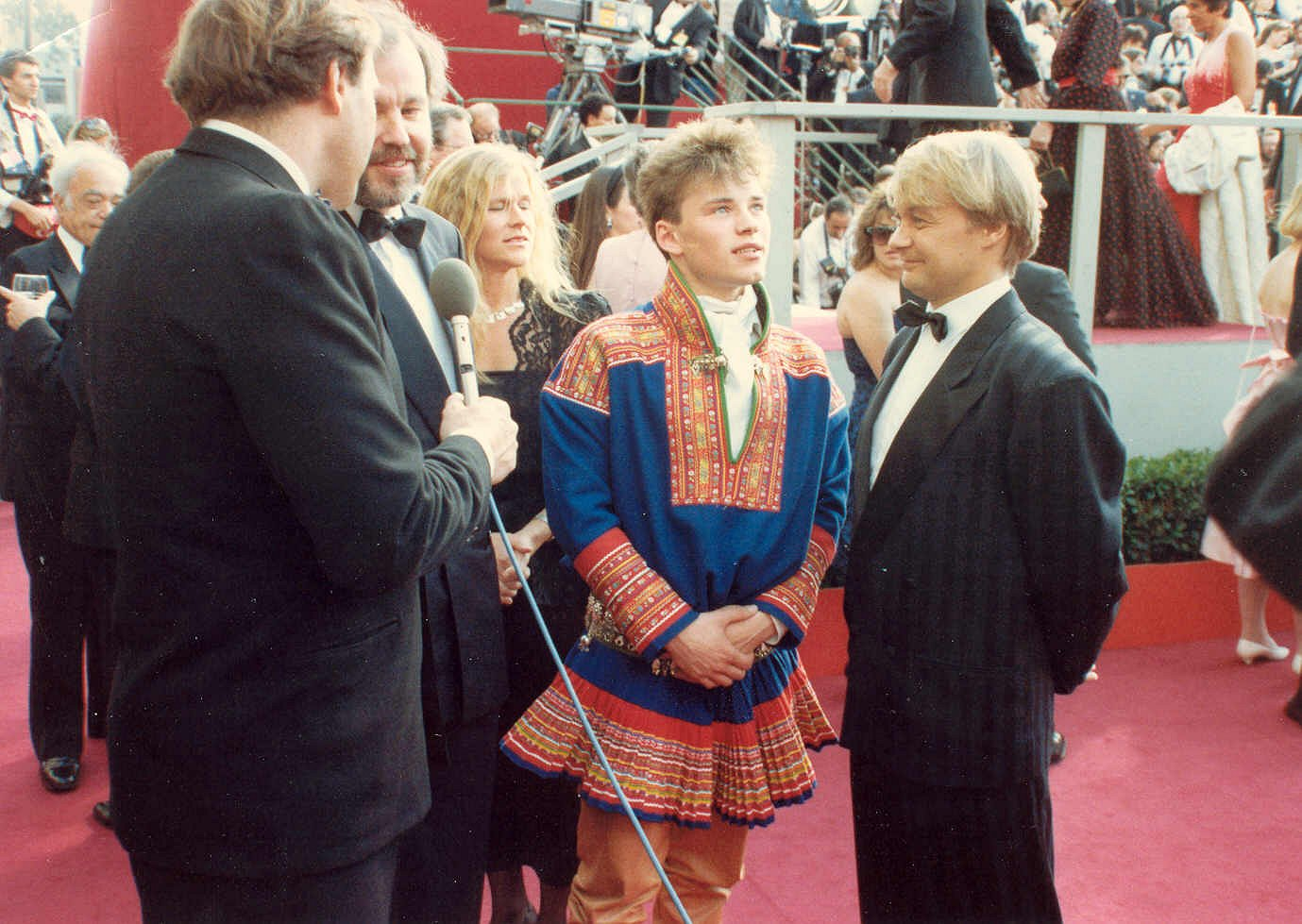
- Mikkel Gaup (middle in a gákti) and Nils Gaup (right) on the red carpet at the 60th Annual Academy Awards
- Born: 16 January 1968 (age 58); Alta, Norway
- Occupation: Actor

Mikkel Mathis Gaup (born 16 January 1968) is a Sámi Norwegian film and stage actor. He is best known for his acting debut in the film Pathfinder, directed by his uncle Nils Gaup, and he has also appeared in a number of other productions, including Breaking the Waves and The Kautokeino Rebellion.

== Career ==
Gaup was born in Alta, Norway. He made his film debut in 1987, playing the leading role as Aigin in the film Pathfinder. The film was nominated for Best Foreign Language Film at the 1988 Oscars.

He also appeared in a number of other films, including the 1991 film The Miracle, the 1996 film Breaking the Waves, and the 2008 film The Kautokeino Rebellion as "Aslak Hætta".

As stage actor he has worked for various theatres, including Beaivváš Sámi Teahter, Den Nationale Scene and Riksteatret.

He has also performed and recorded joik, a form of traditional Sami folk music.

He participated in Melodi Grand Prix 2021 alongside Marianne Pentha with the song "Pages".

He had a minor role in Let the River Flow, a 2023 Sámi historical drama inspired by the Alta controversy.

== Personal life ==
Mikkel has a daughter from a relationship with Laila Rennan. He married Trine Næssvik in July 2012 in Gudbrandsdalen.
