= Sameby =

Swedish legal entity for Sámi reindeer herding

In Sweden, a sameby (literally "Sámi village") is a legal entity for reindeer herding, rights for which belongs to Sámi people, hence the name. They are regulated by the Swedish Reindeer Herding Act, according to which a sameby cannot carry out any other economic activities.

This type of entity, called lappby (literally "Lapp village") at the time, was introduced by the 1886 Reindeer Herding Act.

Similar entities exist in Finland and Norway, see "Siida" article.

In 2013, there were 51 sameby.

== See also ==
- List of sameby in Sweden
