= Siida =

Saami social structure

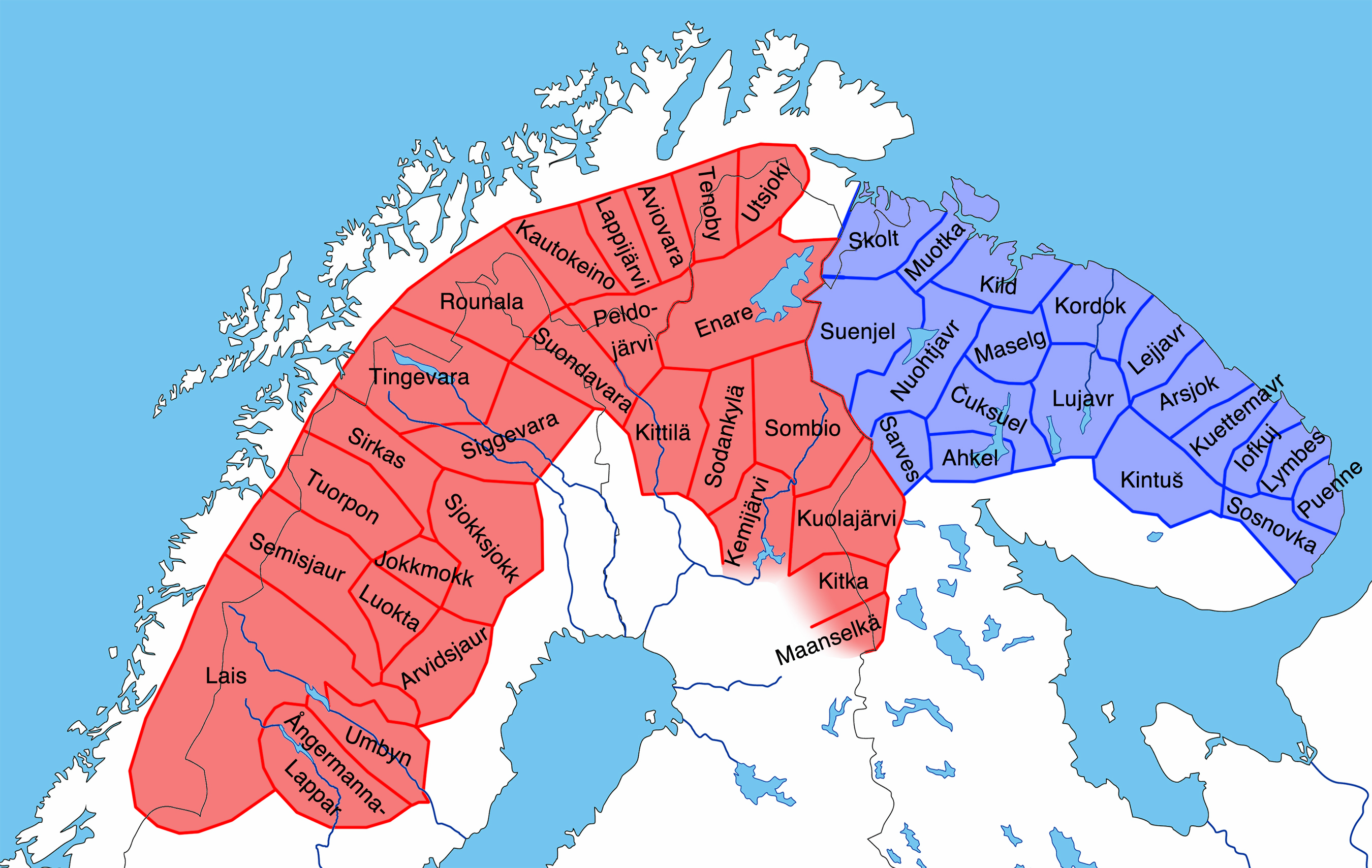
Reindeer-herding communities/Sámi settlements of 16th century Sápmi

A siida is an organisation of humans traditionally present in Sámi societies consisting of several families of reindeer herders whose reindeer graze together. Siidas traditionally encompassed more resources than reindeer, but after changes in Sámi societies over the course of the 1600s, only reindeer herders still practiced this system. It is termed a sameby ('Sámi village') in Swedish law, reinbeitedistrikt ('reindeer pasture district') in Norwegian law, and paliskunta ('reindeer herding district') in Finnish law. The pastoralist organisation differs slightly between countries, except in Russia, where kolkhoz replaced these earlier organisations.

== Sweden ==
In Sweden, according to the Reindeer Herding Act, membership in a sameby follows "pastoralist rights" based on statute of limitations, and is limited to individuals of Sámi descent. There are thirty-three mountain siidas, ten forest samebys and eight concession samebys, divided by historical extent, summer and winter pasture usage, etc. Membership is required to practice pastoralist rights. This is required for reindeer ownership as well, except in concession samebys, where even non-members can own "serve reindeers", served by sameby members who receiving concession to pasture lands in payment. This custom originates in older conventions when reindeer were used by settled local populations in daily life. The economic activity in present-day samebys is limited to profit from pastoralist rights.

Based on historic Swedification policies that distinguished between settled and nomadic Sámi, in 1928 the membership in Swedish samebys essentially limited to those whose ancestors were nomads before 1886, barring the settled Swedish Sámi from membership in a sameby. This restriction was removed by the 1971 version of the Reindeer Herding Act.

=== List of sameby ===
In 2013, there were 51 sameby, of which 8 were concession sameby and 9 were forest sameby.

Mountain sameby: Könkämä, Lainiovuoma, Saarivuoma, Talma, Gabna, Leavas, Girjas, Báste, Unna Tjerusj, Sirges, Jåkkåkaskatjiellde, Tuorpon, Luokta Mavas, Semisjaur-Njarg, Svaipa, Grans, Rans, Ubmeje tjeälddie, Vapstens, Vilhelmina norra, Vilhelmina södra, Frostvikens norra, Ohredahke, Raedtievaerie, Jiingevaerie, Jovnevaerie, Njaarke, Kall, Handölsdalens, Tåssåsens, Mittådalens, Ruvhten Sijte, and Idre

Forest sameby: Vittangi, Gällivare, Serri, Udtja, Ståkke, Maskaur, Västra Kikkejaur, Östra Kikkejaur, Mausjaur, and Malå

Concession sameby: Muonio, Sattajärvi, Tärendö, Korju, Pirttijärvi, Ängeså, Kalix, and Liehittäjä

== Norway ==
In Norway, pastoralist activity requires membership in a unit (driftsenhet), corresponding to a reindeer herd. The rights to conduct pastoralism are based on statute of limitations and limited to individuals of Sámi descent.

The 2007 Reindeer Husbandry Act revised the official reindeer district system to acknowledge and incorporate traditional siida units, improving recognition of Sámi land rights and centering reindeer grazing activities on ecologically and economically sustainable resource use based on local culture and tradition. Prior to the act, Norwegian authorities maintained their own definitions of reindeer herding districts, leading to piecemeal development and sales of land, disconnecting traditional pasture areas.

== Finland ==
In Finland and Russia, pastoralist activity is not limited to ethnic Sámi. In Finland, reindeer herding is also practiced by non-Sámi Finns. There are 56 paliskuntas, of which 13 in the extreme north of Lapland constitute the Sámi area. However, reindeer herding has a more prominent economic role in the local communities of the north. Siidas are governed like stock companies, where the reindeer-holders elect a board of directors and a chief executive officer (poroisäntä, 'reindeer master') every three years, voting with as many votes as they have reindeer.

== Russia ==
In Russia, Arctic peoples were forcibly relocated to kolkhozes (collective communities) by the state between 1927 and 1940, including the Sámi of the Kola Peninsula. The Sámi were moved to kolchozes in the pogosts of Kamensky, Iokangsky, Kildinsky, Lovozersky, and Voronensk, and eventually two raion (administrative district) in Murmansk Oblast were designated as Sámi districts, Lovozersky District and Saamsky District.
