= Inger Elin Utsi =

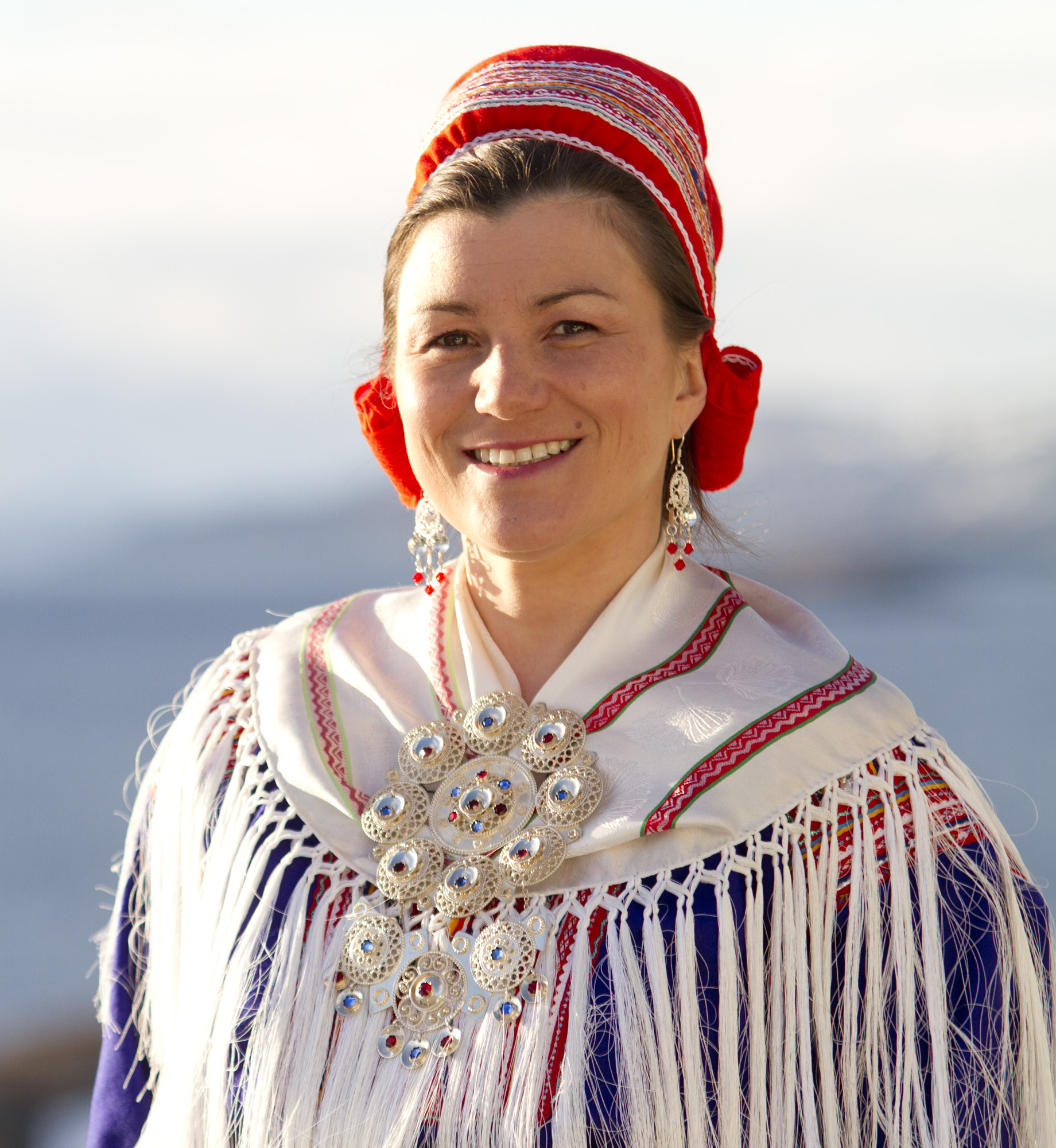
- Born: 1975 (age 50–51)
- Occupations: Politician, actor, journalist

Inger Elin Kristina Ivarsdatter Utsi (born 1975) is a Norwegian-Sami politician and actor who has appeared in several films.

Utsi grew up in Kautokeino Municipality and now lives in Alta Municipality in Finnmark county, Norway. She works at the University of Tromsø, and has previously worked in journalism.

As an actress, she had roles in the films Pathfinder (1987) and The Kautokeino Rebellion (2008). She also appeared in the television series Hjerterått, which aired on the Norwegian station NRK Super in 2013.

She was elected to the Sami Parliament of Norway in 2013, representing the Nordre electoral district for the Norwegian Sami Association party. She was elected as a substitute member for Silje Karine Muotka when Muotka was elected to the Sami Parliament's executive council.
