= Kautokeino rebellion =

1852 Sámi revolt in Kautokeino, Norway

Coordinates: 69.0031°N 23.0471°E

The Sámi revolt in Guovdageaidnu, also known as the Kautokeino uprising, was a revolt in the village of Kautokeino in Kautokeino Municipality in northern Norway in 8th November 1852 by a group of Sámi who attacked representatives of the Norwegian authorities and other locals. The rebels killed the local merchant and the local lensmann, whipped their servants, town residents and the village priest, and burned down the merchant's house. The rebels were later seized by other Sámi, who killed two of the rebels in the process. Two of the leaders, Mons Somby and Aslak Hætta, were later executed by the Norwegian government.

== Background ==
The incident was connected to a religious revival movement that was inspired by the preacher Lars Levi Laestadius. His teaching, which had great influence on the Sámi in Norway at the time, demanded a more spiritually pure lifestyle and abstaining from alcohol. The movement turned more militant as their followers, called Laestadians, saw the Norwegian State Church as too close to the state-run alcohol industry. They formed their own congregations separate from the state church. In a short period of time, a minority of these followers became more militant. They believed their moral authority was greater than that of the state church, and they were later accused of interrupting its services. Penance, conversion and reincarnation were important aspects of their belief. Their deeds were sacred; through good deeds they could have God’s salvation. They saw themselves as free of sin, fair and holy and they believed their spirit was above God. Moreover, they believed the Devil lived in those who didn’t convert. They believed their divinely ordained mission was to exterminate evil and all non-believers were their targets, including other Sami.

During this time, the Sámi were economically far poorer than the Norwegian settlers in the north, counting wealth in reindeer or other livestock (rather than currency), and they were considered socially inferior to the Norwegians. The local merchant, Carl Johan Ruth, who sold the local Sámi liquor, was a target for the rebellion due to his repeated cheating and exploitation of Sámi customers, many of whom were vulnerable alcoholics. Alcoholism was widespread and had been highly destructive to the Sámi and their culture during this time. The Laestadians were against the sale and use of liquor. Thus, the Sámi were at odds not only with the local priest and merchant but also Norwegian law.

There were also multiple cases of unrest the year before. The priest and merchant received threats and church service got interrupted. Multiple people got arrested after a priest sued them. Nils Vibe Stockfleth became the parish to calm the conflict, as he was known as someone who fought for the Sámi people. It did not work, and the conflict escalated.

== The Revolt ==
A group of men and women walked up to a courtyard, poles in hand. There they met merchant Carl Johan Ruth and his friend, lensmann Lars Johan Bucht. The men were asked to convert but refused. The rebels attacked, the men were whipped and beaten before being killed. They continued with the intention of meeting the local priest. He was asked the same, but he also refused to convert so the rebels whipped him. Afterwards the rebels lead a group of locals to the parsonage where they were shut in and whipped. A group of Sámi that were in Ávži organized a force and went to Kautokeino. When they arrived, they got into a conflict with the rebels. They defeated and captured the rebels and in the following months were sent to Alta to await their trial. The people they captured were freed.

== Aftermath ==
After they were stopped and detained to Alta for their trial they were asked during an interrogation session why they did it. Multiple people said they followed Aslak Hætta, a man who believed himself to be the Lord’s apostle and that he was one with the trinity. Furthermore, they saw his actions as an expression of God’s will. They claimed to be influenced by the Bible. They believed they were in a fight against evil, one between God and the Devil. Some women among them explained they believed the end of the world was near and believed these actions were their way achieve salvation for their soul and to help others convert and get saved too. The group confessed to the murders of Bucht and Ruth under the belief that they were representatives of evil, Ruth because of his unclean soul and Bucht due to lack of faith.

In the aftermath there was debate about Laestadius role in the rebellion, whether he was responsible for it or not.

All the men arrested for participating in the revolt - except the two leaders Aslak Hætta and Mons Somby (who were beheaded in Alta) - ended up in Akershus Fortress at Oslo. The women, including Ellen Aslaksdatter Skum, were imprisoned in Trondheim. Many of the rebels died after a few years in captivity. Among the survivors was Lars Hætta, who had been 18 years old at the time of imprisonment. He was given the time and means in jail to make the first complete translation of the Bible into Northern Sámi.

The Kautokeino rebellion was one of the few violent reactions by the Sámi against the exploitation policies of the Norwegian government and was the only known confrontation between Sámis and Norwegians with loss of human lives. The rebellion was not a direct response to the forced assimilation policy of Norwegianization that later became an official government policy, but the 1852 rebellion affected the choices made by the new Norwegian state as this policy was implemented.

== In contemporary culture ==
The opera Aslak Hetta (1922) by Finnish composer, Armas Launis tells the story of the rebellion in somewhat romanticized form.

In Hanne Ørstavik's 2004 novel Presten (2004, translated into English as The Pastor, 2021), the protagonist, a priest in northern Norway, is writing a PhD on the Kautokeino rebellion. Documents about the rebellion, including an account written by a fictional predecessor of the priest, are integrated within the text.

The Kautokeino Rebellion is a 2008 film directed by Nils Gaup based on the 1852 riots.

The novel "To cook a bear" (originally published 2017) written by Swedish author Mikael Niemi, and its TV-series adaptation (2025), partially circle around the story of Laestadius and his thoughts of the events leading up to the rebellion.

The 2023 novel The End of Drum-Time by American author Hanna Pylväinen is "organized around the Kautokeino Rebellion of 1852."
