= Pathfinder (1987 film) =

1987 Norwegian action-adventure film by Nils Gaup

- International poster
- Directed by: Nils Gaup
- Written by: Nils Gaup
- Produced by: John M. Jacobsen
- Starring: Nils-Aslak Valkeapää; Mikkel Gaup; Nils Utsi; Helgi Skúlason; Svein Scharffenberg; Sverre Porsanger; Inger Elin Utsi; Sara Marit Gaup
- Cinematography: Erling Thurmann-Andersen
- Edited by: Niels Pagh Andersen
- Music by: Nils-Aslak Valkeapää; Marius Müller; Kjetil Bjerkestrand
- Production companies: Norsk Film; Norway Film Development Company; Filmkameratene; Mayco AS
- Distributed by: International Film Exchange; Carolco Pictures (United States)
- Release date: 3 September 1987
- Running time: 86 minutes
- Country: Norway
- Language: Northern Sámi
- Budget: NOK17 million
- Box office: NOK17.5 million

Pathfinder (original title in Sámi: Ofelaš; and in Norwegian: Veiviseren) is a 1987 Norwegian action-adventure film written and directed by Nils Gaup. It is based on an old Sámi legend.

It was the first full-length film in Sámi, and it was nominated for the Academy Award for Best Foreign Language Film in 1988. The leading role was played by Mikkel Gaup as Aigin. Nils-Aslak Valkeapää played one of the parts as well as writing the music to the film, together with Kjetil Bjerkestrand and Marius Müller.

== Name ==
The film is called Ofelaš, which means 'guide' in the Saami language. In Norwegian it is called Veiviseren, which roughly translates to 'pathfinder' which is also the English title.

== Plot ==
In Finnmark around AD 1000, Raste, the noaidi (pathfinder) of group of Sámi is heard saying that he has seen his spirit animal, a bull reindeer, for the final time in his life, a terrible omen. Meanwhile, a young man named Aigin comes home from hunting to find his family massacred by a raiding group of Chudes. A tumbling ski gives away his hiding place, and he flees in panic, pursued by the Chudes, who fire at him with crossbows. He is wounded but makes his way to a community of other Sámis who live some distance away. Aigin's wound is treated by Raste, the noaidi. He gets into a debate with the Sámis about how to face the Chude attackers: some argue for meeting them in battle, while others maintain they should all leave toward the coast, where they might find help from other Sámis. Aigin and some of the other hunters remain to meet the Chudes, while the remainder of the group flee. The hunters, except Aigin and Raste, who hide, are quickly killed by the numerically superior Chudes. Raste gives his mystic drum to Aigin, and confronts the Chudes, who beat and torture him. To prevent the torture, Aigin reveals himself and offers to act as a guide for the Chudes to the coastal settlement. Raste is killed in secret by the Chudes, who steal his personal knife. The Sámis reach the coastal settlement but find that the menfolk are away from the village on a hunting expedition. They secretly watch for the arrival of the Chudes, and see Aigin guiding them, declaring him a traitor.

Seeing Raste's knife in the hands of a fierce Chude, Aigin realises that Raste is dead, and formulates a plan. He cannot overpower the Chudes, but he can trick them. Leading the Chudes across mountainous terrain, Aigin lures them on to treacherous paths where they are forced to tie themselves together with rope for security. Aigin leads the Chudes along a tiny path over a frozen precipice, where he unties himself and escapes. In the confusion of the pursuit, several Chudes slip off the cliff, and their leaders cut their ropes to save themselves from being dragged over the edge by their own men. Aigin desperately claws his way up the cliff, pursued by the vengeful Chude leaders, who are determined to kill him. Aigin frantically kicks at the snow and starts an avalanche, pushing the remaining Chudes over the cliff in a wave of snow and rock.

The Sámi had seen Aigin's heroic action, and mourn Aigin as their saviour - but Aigin is still alive. Reaching the top of the cliff and lying exhausted, he is dazzled by the Northern Lights overhead, and then by a profound mystic vision of a bull reindeer. He reaches the coastal village, and surprises the Sámi. Aigin passes Raste's mystic drum to the Sámi matriarch, declaring "you've lost your pathfinder". The matriarch solemnly says "we've also found one", and returns the mystic drum to Aigin. As the film ends, the Sámi sit around the fire in the same positions as the figures on the mystic drum, with Aigin in the pathfinder's place.

== Cast ==
- Mikkel Gaup as Aigin
- Sara Marit Gaup as Sahve
- Nils Utsi as Raste
- Anna Maria Blind as Varia
- Ingvald Guttorm as Aigin's Father
- Ellen Anne Bulj as Aigin's Mother
- Inger Utsi as Aigin's Sister
- Henrik H. Buljo as Dorakas
- Nils-Aslak Valkeapää as Siida-Isit
- Helgi Skúlason as a Chude with scar
- Svein Scharffenberg as the Chude chief
- Knut Walle as a Chude interpreter
- John Sigurd Kristensen as a Chude strongman
- Svein Birger Olsen as Diemis
- Sverre Porsanger as Sierge
- Amund Johnskareng as Heina
- Ailo Gaup as Orbes

== Production ==
The film was written and directed by Nils Gaup, who based the story on a Sámi legend with variants in a number of Scandinavian folklores. Gaup said he heard the story from his grandfather, who was in turn told the story by a traditional storyteller. Gaup wove the story around the core of the legend, and introduced details such as the shamanic initiation rite and a romantic element with the character Sahve. The film was set in the pre-Christian era in the region depicting the worldview of the Sámi people.

The film was shot in Kautokeino Municipality on the Finnmarksvidda plateau during the winter of 1987, where temperatures were as low as −47 °C (−53 °F). This presented unique difficulties with the cast, crew, and camera equipment in the harsh cold. Most of the cast were Sámi, and were used to the cold, but the stuntmen hired from outside the region refused to work under such conditions and were replaced by a team who had worked in the Bond film A View to a Kill. There was also sabotage of the equipment by local people suspicious of outsiders. The coastal scenes were shot in Berlevåg Municipality.

The original title was Ofelaš, which is a Sámi word that translates to "pathfinder". The film is in the Sámi language, and a Chude language created by Esben Kr. Aamot. (Note: Los Angeles Times made a typo in the name of the language creator, who is Esben Krisoffer Aamot) The director, however, chose not to subtitle the Chude language. The film is considered to be the first Sámi feature-length film. The film went over the budget by 2.5 million, eventually costing 17 million krone, and became what was then Norway's most expensive film. The film is a co-production of Filmkameratene A/S, the Norway Film Development Co. A/S and Norsk Film A/S. It was produced by John M. Jacobsen. It was distributed worldwide by International Film Exchange/Carolco Film International and first released on 3 November 1987 in Norway, and released in the United States on 7 April 1989.

== Reception ==
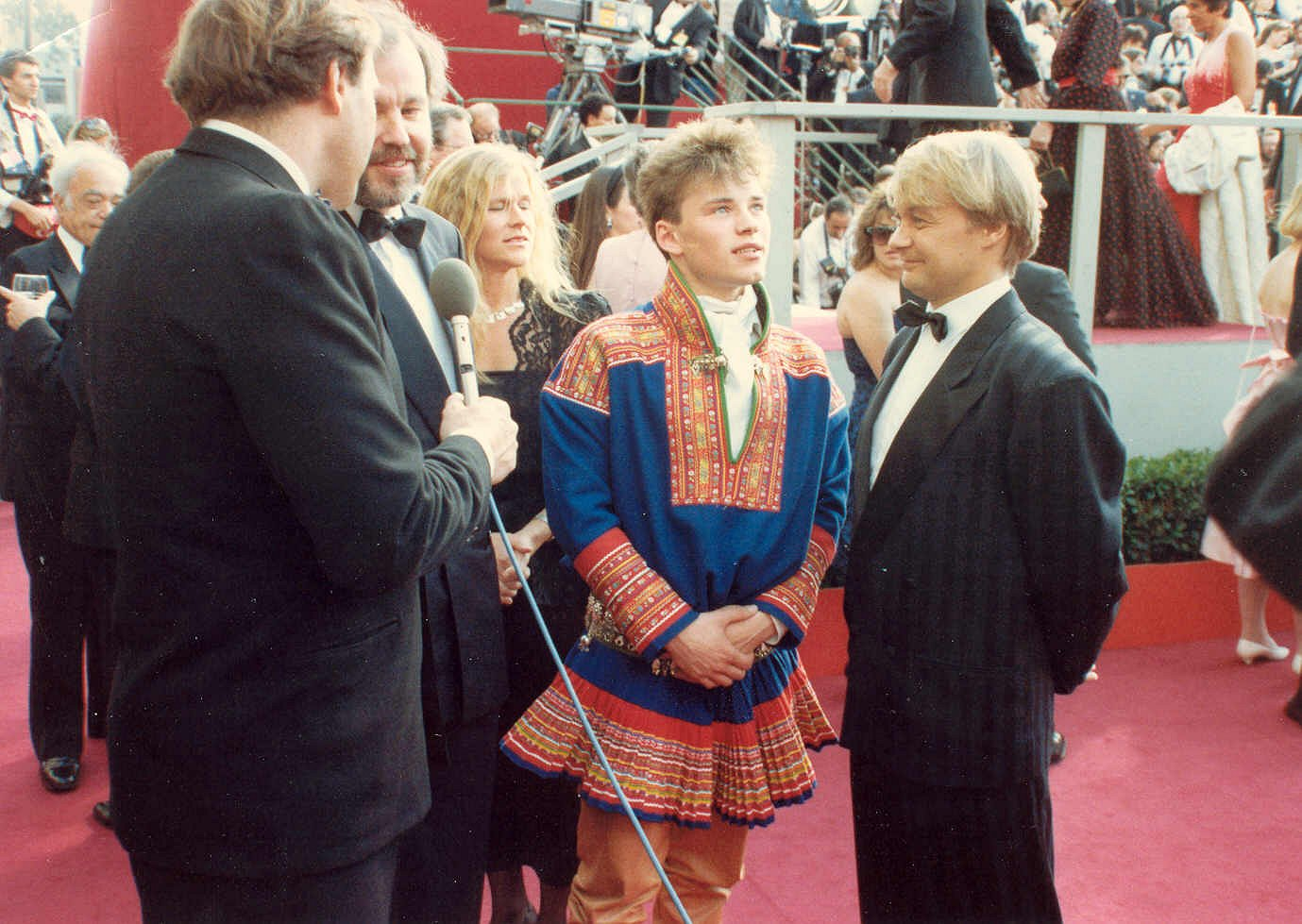
Mikkel Gaup and Nils Gaup at the Oscars where the film was nominated for Best Foreign Language Film

Initial critical reception for the film was lukewarm, but it was popular in the box office in Norway, where 700,000 attended screenings of the film. The film was nominated for Best Foreign Language Film at the 1988 Oscars, but lost to Babette's Feast. It won the Amanda Best Film award in 1988. The film is now often considered one of the best films of Norwegian cinema.

The film is seen as part of the Sámi revitalisation movement that celebrates the survival of the Sámi language, culture and tradition that resisted assimilation into the wider Norwegian culture.

== Remake ==
An American remake also titled Pathfinder was released in 2007. This remake is only loosely based on the 1987 film. A graphic novel of the remake was also produced.

== Awards and nominations ==
Award	Category	Recipients and nominees	Result	Ref
Academy Awards	Best Foreign Language Film	Pathfinder	Nominated	
Amanda Award	Best Film	Pathfinder	Won	
London Film Festival Awards	Sutherland Trophy	Nils Gaup	Won	

== See also ==
- List of historical drama films
- List of submissions to the 60th Academy Awards for Best Foreign Language Film
- List of Norwegian submissions for the Academy Award for Best Foreign Language Film
