= Mons Somby =

Leader of the Kautokeino Rebellion

Mons Aslaksen Somby
- Born: 14 February 1825; Kautokeino?, Norway
- Died: 14 October 1854 (age 29); Alta, Norway
- Occupation: Reindeer herder

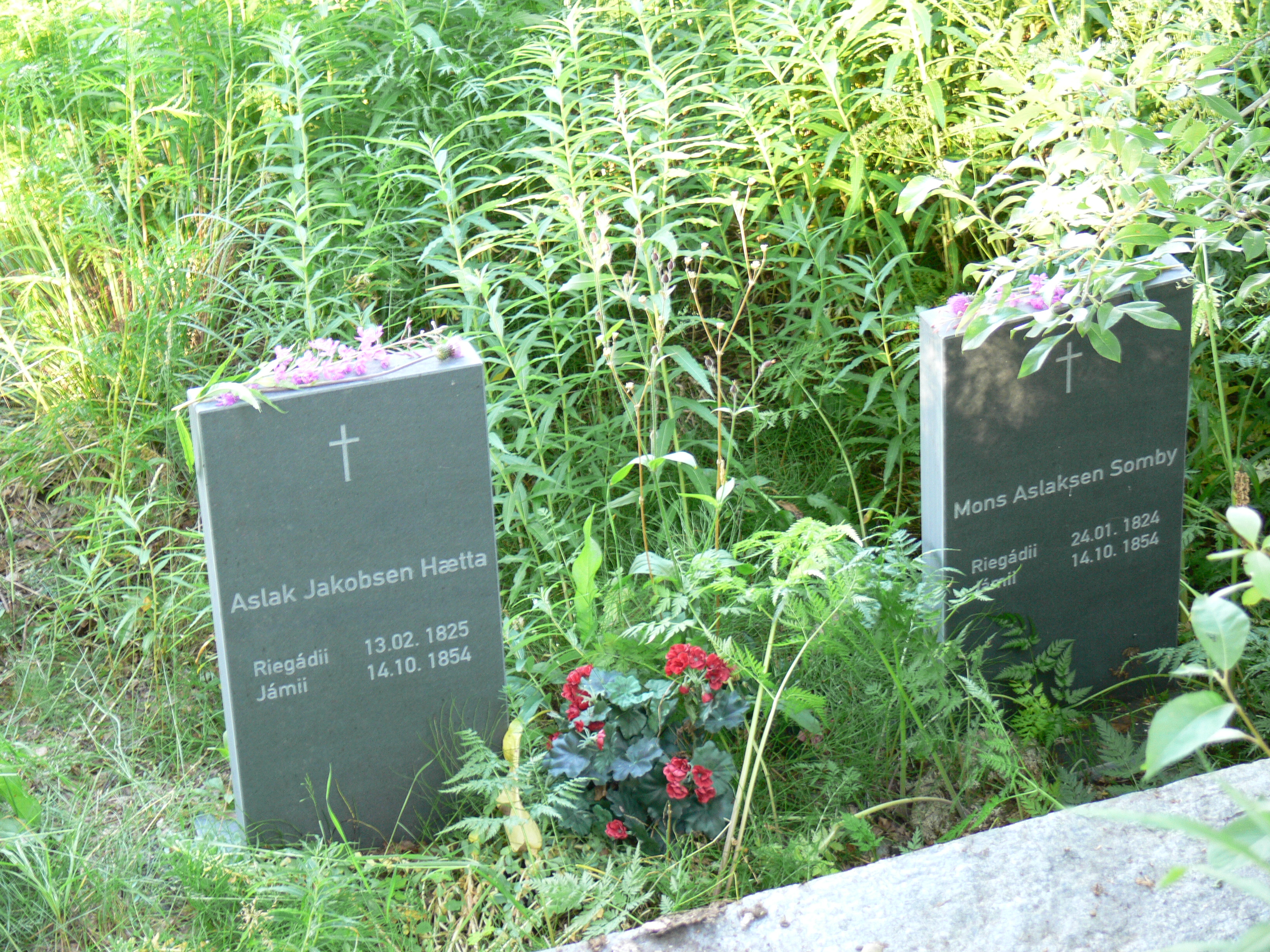
Graves of Aslak Hætta and Mons Somby

Mons Aslaksen Somby (14 February 1825 – 14 October 1854) was one of the leaders of the Sami rebels that attacked several Norwegian shops during the Kautokeino rebellion of 1852. During the uprising a merchant and the town sheriff were killed and others were whipped. Several buildings were also destroyed during the riots. Somby was executed by beheading in 1854. Mons Aslaksen Somby was married to Inger Johannesdatter Hætta, with whom he had a son.

== Early life ==
Mons Somby and his siblings were converts to the Laestadian Movement at the end of the 1840s, but because of the excesses of the Norwegian locals and government they became an extremist group and by the early 1850s they were no longer receiving advice from Lars Levi Laestadius, the leader of the religious movement.

During the summer of 1851, Mons was arrested and sentenced to 15 days imprisonment on bread and water for the disruption of the religious services in the Skjervøy Church. His brother, also involved in the disruption, suffered the same punishment, while his sister was sentenced to 10 days in prison on bread and water. After their release, they traveled to a large siida headed by their father Aslak Olsen Somby during the summer of 1852. It was from this siida which the Kautokeino rebellion was carried out.

== Aftermath of the Kautokeino rebellion ==
Mons also had a 25-year-old brother who participated in the uprising, named Ole Somby, who died of a brain injury after being hit in the head with a bat while trying to escape capture during the transport from Kautokeino to Alta. The death penalty was not invoked for his sister Marit Somby, but she died in prison before her case came to trial. His father, Aslak Olsen Somby, was sentenced to life imprisonment. Their mother, Inger Mons Siridotter, who was 60 years old during the rebellion, was prosecuted, but was found innocent of the charges.

Mons Aslaksen Somby and Aslak Jacobsen Hætta were sentenced to death and decapitated at Elvebakken in Alta Municipality, Norway on 14 October 1854.

After their execution, their bodies were buried in graves just outside the Kåfjord Church graveyard in Alta, which meant that they were outside the Norwegian State Church's blessing. However, their heads were sent on to the Anatomisk Institute at the University of Oslo, where they became part of the university's skull collections.

== Retrieval of Mons Somby's skull ==
In 1985, a relative of Mons Somby, Niillas Somby tried to obtain Mons skull for proper burial, but the Anatomisk Institute refused the extradition, claiming that the skull was the department's property. The department also stated that Mons Somby was a convicted criminal and a murderer and that no attempt should be made to describe Mons as a martyr to any cause. After the Norwegian Television NRK of Finnmark aired a story about the case in 1996, the president of the Sami Parliament took up the issue up with university and shortly afterward, the skulls of both Mons and Aslak Hætta were released to relatives.

In November 1997, the skulls of both Mons Somby and Aslak Hætta were buried in a grave at the Kåfjord Church in Alta, at the same spot as their bodies were buried over one-hundred and forty years earlier. The story of the extradition of Mons Sombys skull to Niillas was the focus of the 2000 movie, Give Us Our Skeletons.

== General references ==
- Nellejet Zorgdrager. De rettferdiges strid : Kautokeino 1852 : samisk motstand mot norsk kolonialisme; omsett frå nederlandsk av Trond Kirkeby-Garstad. - Nesbru : Vett & viten; Oslo : i samarbeid med Norsk folkemuseum, 1997. - 558 s. .(Samiske samlinger; B.18, red.: Ove Pettersen).
- Audhild Schanche, Nordisk samisk inst.; Knoklenes verdi: Om forskning på og forvaltning av skjelettmateriale fra samiske graver (PDF)
