= Armas Launis =

Finnish composer (1884–1959)

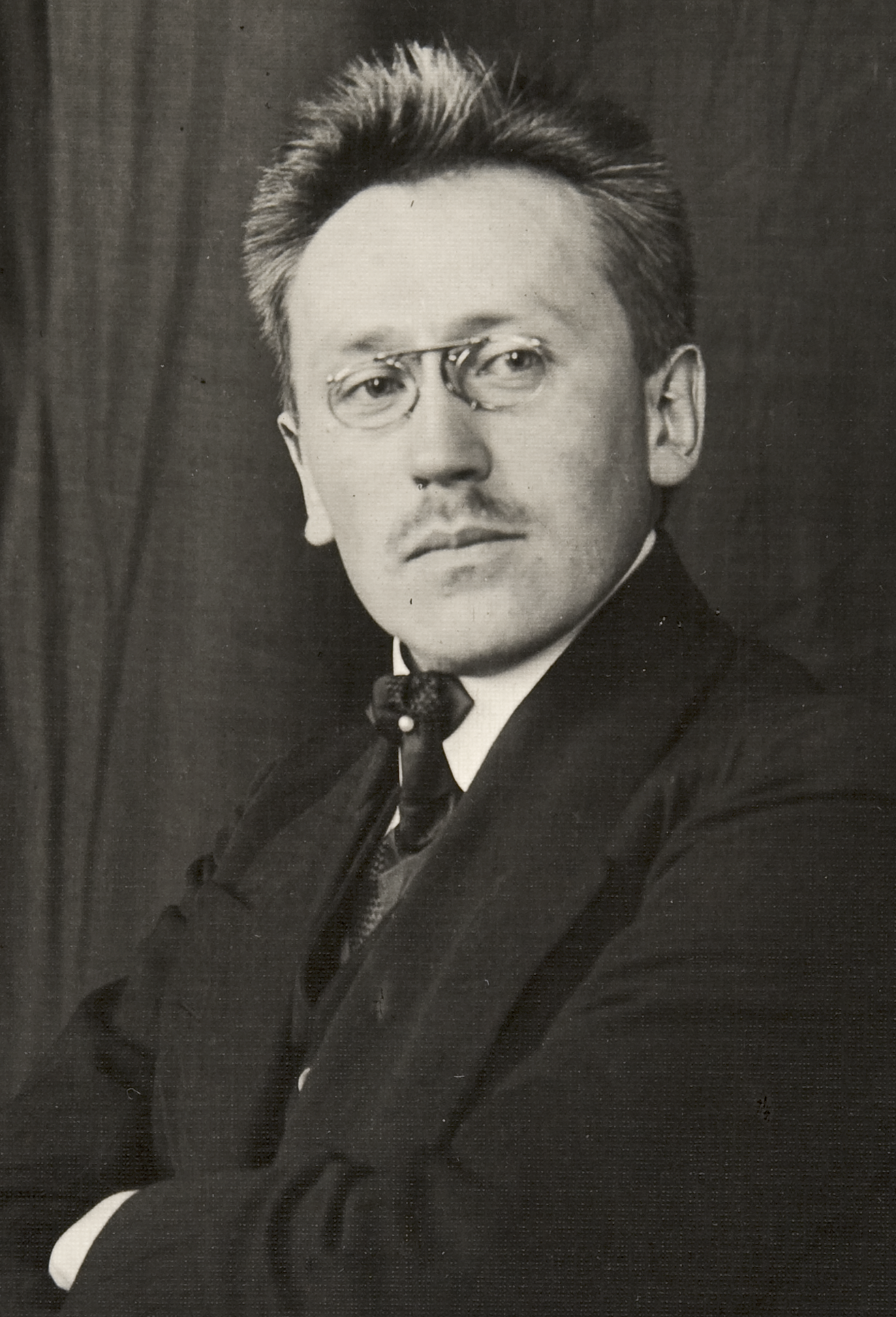
The composer (c. 1910s)

Armas Launis (April 22, 1884 – August 7, 1959), was a Finnish composer as well as an ethnomusicologist, a professor, a writer and a journalist. He was born in Hämeenlinna.

== Composer ==
Armas Launis was mainly an opera composer. He wrote ten operas (both libretto and music). Several were performed:

- In Finland: "The Seven Brothers" (1913), the first Finnish opera comique, and "Kullervo" (1917), both in full stage performance, and a concert performance of "Aslak Hetta" in 2004 at Finlandia Hall, Helsinki, directed by Sakari Oramo.
- In France: stage performance of Kullervo (1940, Nice, Palais de la Méditerranée) with radio broadcasts on Paris-Inter and Radio Monte-Carlo (1938–1940). A short version of "Jehudith" was also broadcast in 1954 (Paris-Inter)

Armas Launis also wrote chamber music pieces, cantatas, choruses, suites for orchestra, and the music of the first Finnish ethnographic film "A Wedding in Karelia, the Land of Poetry" (1921).

== Ethnomusicologist ==
Launis was one of the first scholars to research and collect folk music. He was very open-minded; passionately fond of travels, which he undertook alone; and eager to meet other people. He travelled to Lapland (1904, 1905, 1922), Kainuu (1902), Ingria (1903, 1906), Karelia (1902, 1905), and Estonia (1930). Everywhere, he was happy to meet local people and had long conversations with them, jotting down popular melodies. Launis also recorded famous singers, hired mourners, and kantele players. He understood the richness and vitality of sung poetry together with the importance of folklore. His numerous publications and the corpus he collected are still recognized and used; they are valuable additions to the common inheritance of the Finnish nation.

Later, Launis travelled in North Africa and became interested in Arabic, Berber, and Bedouin music. This influence can be felt in later works, especially the operas Théodora and Jéhudith.

== Professor ==
Launis earned a Ph.D. (1911) and was full professor at the University of Helsinki where he taught musical analysis and composition. He completed his studies in Berlin with Wilhelm Klatte and in Weimar with Waldemar von Baußnern. Deeply concerned with the availability of musical education for everyone, Launis founded and until 1930 directed the first popular conservatories in Finland, which still exist.

As early as 1920, Launis received a life pension from the Finnish State, with the permission to live abroad.

== Journalist ==
Anxious to maintain contact with his homeland, Launis regularly contributed to various Finnish newspapers including Helsingin Sanomat, Uusi Suomi, and Suomen Kuvalehti. He co-founded and was an active member of the Sociéte de la presse étrangère de la Côte d'Azur (Association of Foreign Press of the French Riviera), and he was a journalist for the Association française d'expansion et d'échanges artistiques (French Association for the Development of Artistic Exchanges).

In 1930 Launis settled permanently in Nice, France, and lived there the remainder of his life. He took an active part in musical and cultural exchanges between France and Finland.

== Works ==
=== Operas ===
- The Seven Brothers (1913)
- Kullervo (1917)
- Aslak Hetta (1922)
- The Witch's Song (1934)
- The Karelian Magic Scarf (1937)
- The summer that never came (unfinished) (1936)
- Jehudith (1937–1940)
- Once upon a time... (unfinished) (1939)
- Theodora (unfinished) (1939)
- The Frozen Flames (1957)

=== Books ===
- Über Art, Entstehung und Verbreitung des estnisch – finnischen Runenmelodien (1910)
- Ooppera ja puhenäytelmä:muutamia vertailevia piirteitä (1915)
- Esivanhempieni muisto 1500–1900 (1921)
- Aslak Hetta: 3-näytöksinen ooppera (libretto 1921)
- Kaipaukseni maa. Lapinkävijän muistoja (1922)
- Murjaanien maassa (1927)
- Suomen maaseutukaupunkien kansankonservatoriot (1927)
- Erään turunmaalaisen saaristolaisuvun vaiheita (1929)
- Tunturisävelmia etsimässä. Lapissa 1904 ja 1905. (Minna-Riikka Järvinen 2004)

=== Corpus of melodies ===
- Lappische Juoigos-Melodien (1908) (Lappish melodies)
- Suomen Kansan sävelmiä IV: Inkerin runosävelmät (1910)
- Suomen partioväen laulukirja (1917)
- Suomen Kansan sävelmiä IV: II Karjalan runosävelmät 1930
- Eesti runoviisid (Tartto 1930)

=== Articles ===
- Runosävelmistä (Kalevalanseuran vuosikirja I, 1921)
- Kullervo-oopperan esihistoriaa (Kalevalaseuran vuosikirja 1, 1921)
- Saamein säveleitä etsimässä (Kalevalaseuran vuosikirja 2, 1922)
- Muuan karjalainen kanteleensoittaja (Kalevalaseuran vuosikirja 1923)

=== Sources ===
- Ahmajärvi, Jouni 2003: "Se maa on taikamaa, on maa mun kaipauksen" Armas Launiksen kuva Lapista ja saamelaisista. Julkaisematon pro gradu-tutkielma Oulun yliopisto, Historian laitos.
- Fantapié, Henri-Claude 2000: Armas Launis(1884–1959): un compositeur finlandais dans le contexte niçois et français. Boréales 2000: 78/81, p. 213–230.
- Fantapié, Henri-Claude 2003: Quand un compositeur du Nord croise un collègue venu du Sud.... Boréales 2003 86/89, p. 249–263.
- Hako, Pekka 1982: Armas Launis 1884-1959-Felix Krohn, Armas Launis, Ernst Linko.Hämeen läänin taidetoimikunta, Hämeenlinna.
- Hako, Pekka 2004: Armas Launis: opera composer. Finnish music quarterly 2004:2, s. 42–47.
- Heinonen, Kati 2005: Armas Launiksen fonogrammit Soikkolasta: laulutavan, runon ja laulutilanteen välisiä yhteyksiä kalevalamittaisessa runoudessa. Pro gradu-tutkielma.
- Jouste, Marko 2004: Armas Launiksen vuoden 1904 Lapin matkan joikusävelmien keräys ja soiva vertailuaineisto. Musiikin suunta 2004:2,s.58-81.
- Järvinen, Minna Riikka 2004: Ummikkona Pohjan perille. – Launis, Armas: Tunturisävelmiä. Lapissa 1904 ja 1905. Toim. Minna Riikka Järvinen. Helsinki: SKS, 341–351.
- Tomasi, Henri 1940: Armas Launis. Notes biographiques. Kullervo. Autres oeuvres. Préface H.Holma. London.
- Väisänen, A.O. 1960: Armas Launis 1884–1959. Kalevalaseuran vuosikirja 40, s. 345–349.
- Tarasti, Eero 2006: Muotokuvia, Imatran Kansainvälisen Semiotiikka-instituutin julkaisuja, nr.3
