= Ellen Aslaksdatter Skum =

Participant of the Kautokeino Rebellion

Ellen Aslaksdatter Skum (26 May 1827 – 10 February 1895) was a Norwegian Sami reindeer herder from Kautokeino Municipality who took part in the 1852 Kautokeino uprising. Inspired by the preacher Lars Levi Laestadius who called for a pure lifestyle and abstinence from alcohol, she was a leading member of a group of Samis who killed the local merchant and the lensmann.

== Biography ==
Born on 26 May 1827 in Kautokeino, Ellen Aslaksdatter Skum was the daughter of Aslak Mortensen Skum (1781–1857) and Ane Henriksdatter Sara (c. 1797–1870). In 1843, she married Mathis Jacobsen Hætta with whom she had two children.

Both Ellen Skum and her husband became members of a strict religious group under Lars Levi Læstadius but interpreted his approach even more severely. In February 1852, she was sentenced to 18 months imprisonment and her husband to eight months after together with 21 other Samis she prevented worship at Skervøy Church on 6 and 7 June 1851.

On 8 November 1852, she was one of the leading members of the uprising which led to the death of the merchant in Kautokeino and to the local lensmann. They found the merchant guilty of selling alcohol which was not only forbidden in their religious group but had caused serious problems for the Samis.

On 14 February 1854, Ellen Skum together with four other members of the uprising was sentenced to death by the Supreme Court, but her sentence was later reduced to life imprisonment in Trondheim. She was pardoned and released from prison in 1867.
