= Nils Gaup =

Sámi film director

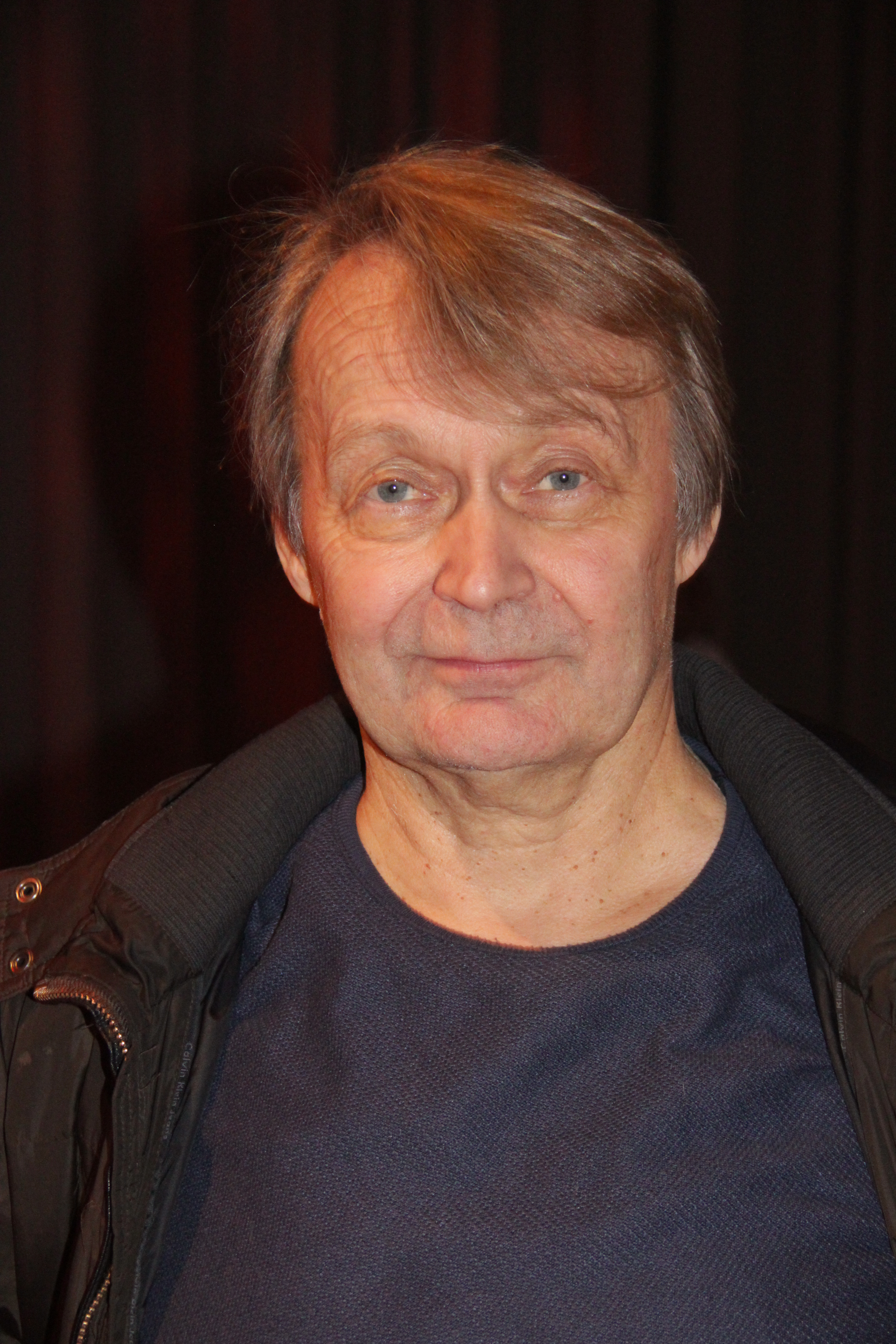
- Nils Gaup at the Gothenburg Film Festival in 2017
- Born: 12 April 1955 (age 71); Kautokeino, Finnmark, Norway
- Occupations: Film director screenwriter
- Years active: 1987–present
- Awards: Amanda; Best Film; 1988 Pathfinder Festival de Cine de Sitges; Special Mention; 1988 Pathfinder British Film Institute; Sutherland Trophy; 1989 Pathfinder Yubari International Fantastic Film Festival; Grand Jury Prize; 1990 Pathfinder

Nils Gaup (born 12 April 1955) is a Sámi film director from Norway.

== Career ==
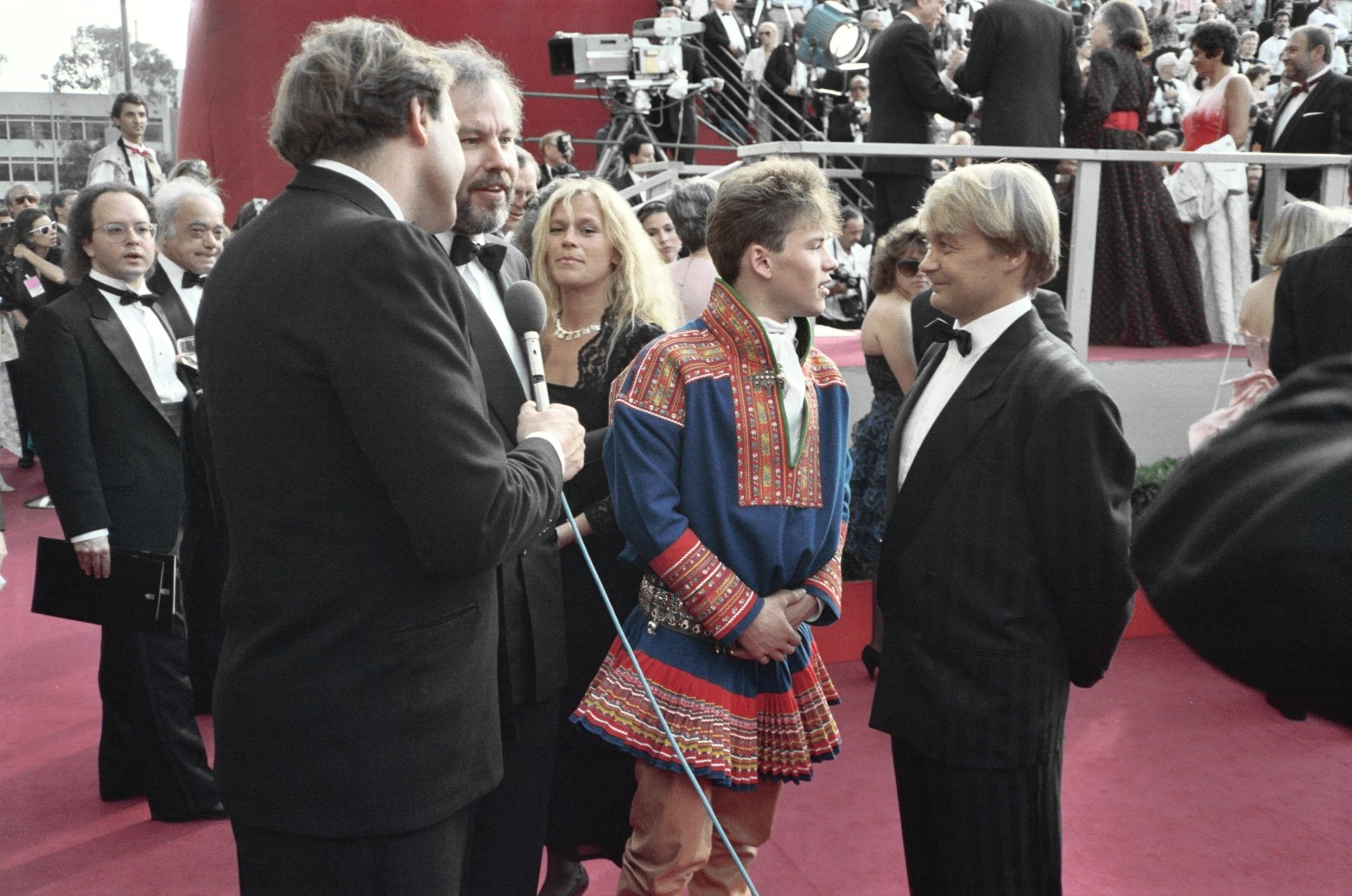
Mikkel Gaup and Nils Gaup at the 1988 Oscar ceremony

Gaup was born in Kautokeino, Finnmark County in Northern Norway. He first intended to become an athlete but from 1974 to 1978 he went to drama school and studied at the Beaivváš Sámi Theatre in Kautokeino. He also founded the first Sami language theatre ensemble.

After acting in several movies, he rose to international prominence in 1987 with his film Ofelaš (international English title Pathfinder). It was the first full-length movie with all of the dialogue in Northern Sámi. This movie earned him an Academy Award nomination for Best Foreign language film and the Grand Prize award at the 1990 Yubari International Fantastic Film Festival. After that he made the Disney-financed movie Haakon Haakonsen (Shipwrecked), based on the youth adventure novel Håkon Håkonsen. En norsk Robinson (Håkon Håkonsen. A Norwegian Robinson) by Norwegian author Oluf Falck-Ytter. In 1993 he shot his most successful film to date Hodet over vannet (Head Above Water). For this film, he won the Amanda Award (the most important Norwegian Film Award). It was remade as a 1996 American film with Cameron Diaz and Harvey Keitel in the leading roles. His next movie was Tashunga (also known as North Star), a project by Christopher Lambert. This film was panned by both the box office and the critics.

Gaup was previously scheduled as director for the Kevin Costner movie Waterworld. But due to exploding costs, he left the project.

He directed the 2008 film Kautokeino-opprøret about the Kautokeino rebellion of 1852 of the town of the same name in Norway. It is the true story of the riots of the Sami people against the church and state domination on alcohol sale.

== Awards ==
Gaup has won numerous awards for the movie Ofelaš, including an Amanda for Best Film in 1988, a special mention at the 1988 Festival de Cine de Sitges, a Sutherland Trophy from the British Film Institute the following year, and the Grand Prize award at the 1990 Yubari International Fantastic Film Festival. In 2009, he was awarded the Skábmagovat Prize, an indigenous film award to honor the significant, long-term contributions he has made to the Sámi culture and communities. In 2022, he won the Anders Jahres Humanitarian Foundation's Culture Prize together with Margreth Olin, Joachim Trier, and Deeyah Khan.

== Filmography ==
=== Director ===
- Pathfinder (1987) also writer
- Shipwrecked (1990) also screenplay
- Hodet over vannet (1993), remade as Head Above Water (1996)
- Just Do It (1994) short film
- North Star (1996)
- Misery Harbour (1999)
- Deadline Torp (2005) tv-series
- The Kautokeino Rebellion (2008) also writer
- Journey to the Christmas Star (2012)
- Glassdukkene (2014)
- The Last King (2016)
- The Riot (2023)

=== Actor ===
- Det andre skiftet (1978) – Olof
- Krypskyttere (1982) – Kåre, soldat
- Nattseilere (1986) – Gilio
- O'Horten (2007) – Same (final film role)

== Awards and nominations ==
- Amanda Award Winner – Pathfinder
- Academy Award Nomination Best Foreign language film – Pathfinder
- Amanda Award Winner – Head above Water

== Personal life ==
Nils Gaup is currently married to Linn-Kristin Henriksen, the sister of actor Stig Frode Henriksen known from the Kill Buljo movie.

Preceded by Mícheál Ó Súilleabháin	Eurovision Song Contest; Final Interval act 1996	Succeeded by Ronan Keating & Boyzone
