= Aslak Hætta =

Leader of the Kautokeino Rebellion

Aslak Jacobsen Hætta
- Born: 24 January 1824; Kautokeino?, Norway
- Died: 14 October 1854 (aged 30); Alta, Norway
- Cause of death: Execution by beheading
- Occupation: Reindeer herder

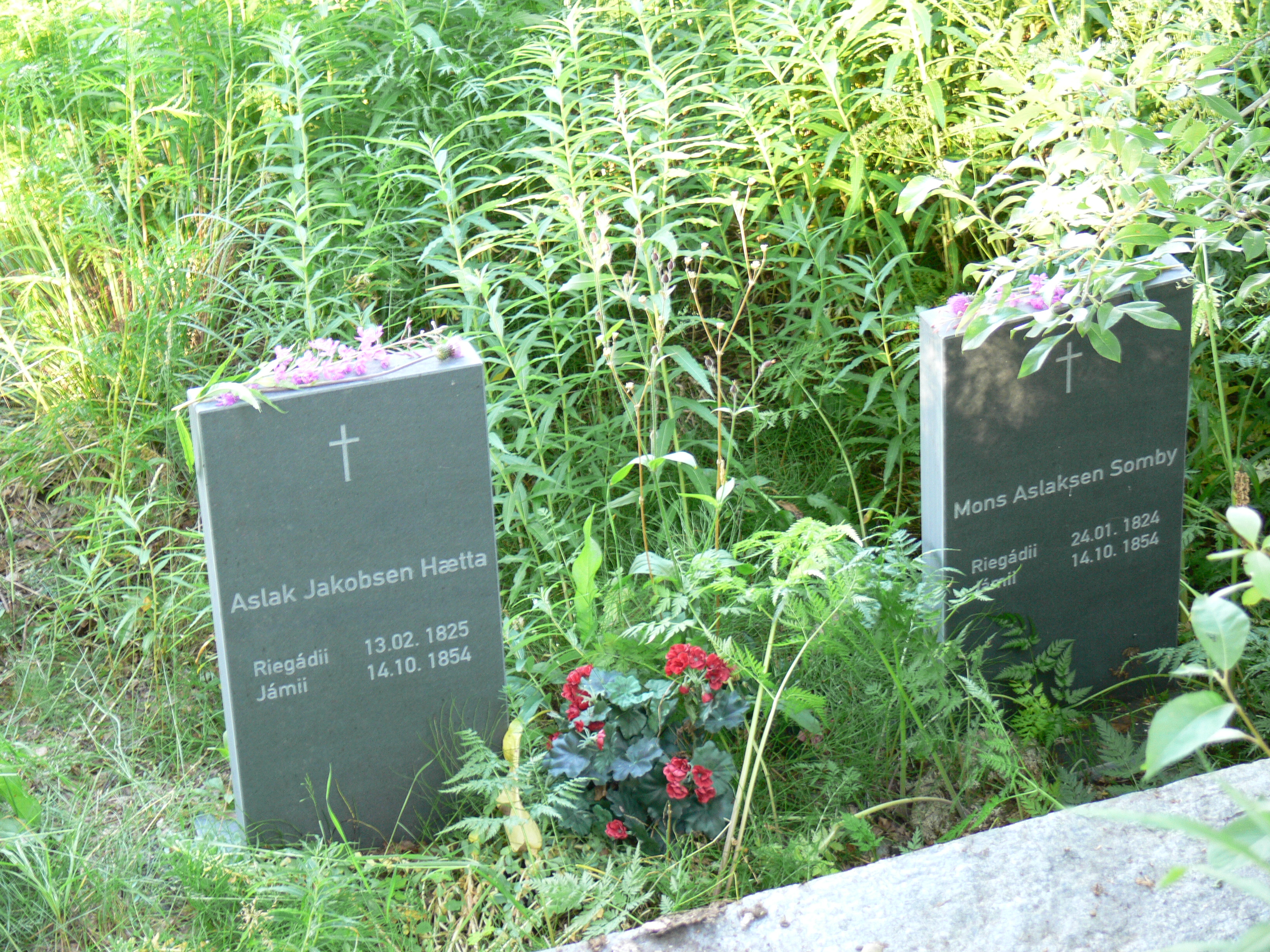
Graves of Aslak Hætta and Mons Somby, executed for their part in the rebellion

Aslak Jacobsen Hætta (24 January 1824 – 14 October 1854) was one of the leaders of the Sami revolt in Guovdageaidnu, called the Kautokeino Rebellion, in November 1852. During the riots, the merchant Carl Johan Ruth and the local government official Lars Johan Bucht were killed and the pastor Fredrik Waldemar Hvoslef was whipped. Hætta was sentenced to death for the murder of Carl Johan Ruth and executed by beheading at the age of 30 years.

Hætta was married to Marith Persdatter Kurak and they had two children.

Hætta, and the rebellion, are the subject of the 1922 opera Aslak Hetta by Finnish composer, Armas Launis, in which their story has been somewhat fictionalized.
