= Akkarfjord =

Akkarfjord or Akkarfjorden may refer to:

== Places ==
=== Fjords ===
- Akkarfjorden (Kvaløya), a small fjord in Hammerfest Municipality in Finnmark county, Norway
- Akkarfjorden (Måsøy), a fjord in Måsøy Municipality in Finnmark county, Norway
- Akkarfjorden (Sørøya), a small fjord in Hammerfest Municipality in Finnmark county, Norway

=== Villages ===
- Akkarfjord (Kvaløya) (Northern Sami: Áhkárvuotna), a small village on the island of Kvaløya in Hammerfest Municipality in Finnmark county, Norway
- Akkarfjord (Sørøya), a fishing village on the island of Sørøya in Hammerfest Municipality in Finnmark county, Norway
