= Sørøysund Municipality =

Former municipality in Finnmark, Norway

Sørøysund Municipality Sørøysund herred
- Former municipality
- Hammerfest landdistrikt (historic name)
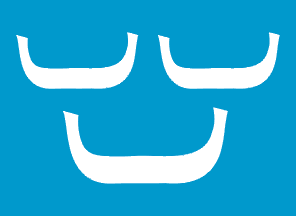
- Flag Coat of arms

- Finnmark within Norway

- Sørøysund within Finnmark
- Coordinates: 70°38′28″N 23°40′19″E
- Country: Norway
- County: Finnmark
- District: Vest-Finnmark
- Established: 1 Jan 1852
  - Preceded by: Hammerfest Municipality
- Disestablished: 1 Jan 1992
  - Succeeded by: Hammerfest Municipality
- Administrative centre: Hammerfest

Government
  - Mayor (1988-1991): Mimmi Bæivi (Ap)

Area (upon dissolution)
  - Total: 837.2 km^{2} (323.2 sq mi)
  - Rank: #131 in Norway
- Highest elevation: 1,078.35 m (3,537.9 ft)

Population (1991)
  - Total: 2,341
  - Rank: #342 in Norway
  - Density: 2.8/km^{2} (7.3/sq mi)
  - Change (10 years): ▲ +5.1%
- Demonym: Sørøyværing

Official language
  - Norwegian form: Bokmål
- Time zone: UTC+01:00 (CET)
  - Summer (DST): UTC+02:00 (CEST)
- ISO 3166 code: NO-2016

Sørøysund is a former municipality in Finnmark county, Norway. The 826-square-kilometre (319 sq mi) municipality existed from 1852 until its dissolution in 1992. The area is now part of Hammerfest Municipality. The administrative centre of Sørøysund was the town of Hammerfest, even though the town was not part of Sørøysund Municipality. Notable villages in the municipality included Akkarfjord, Forsøl, Kårhamn, and Rypefjord.

Prior to its dissolution in 1992, the 837-square-kilometre (323 sq mi) municipality was the 131st largest by area out of the 448 municipalities in Norway. Sørøysund Municipality was the 342nd most populous municipality in Norway with a population of about 2,341. The municipality's population density was 2.8 inhabitants per square kilometre (7.3/sq mi) and its population had increased by 5.1% over the previous 10-year period.

== History ==
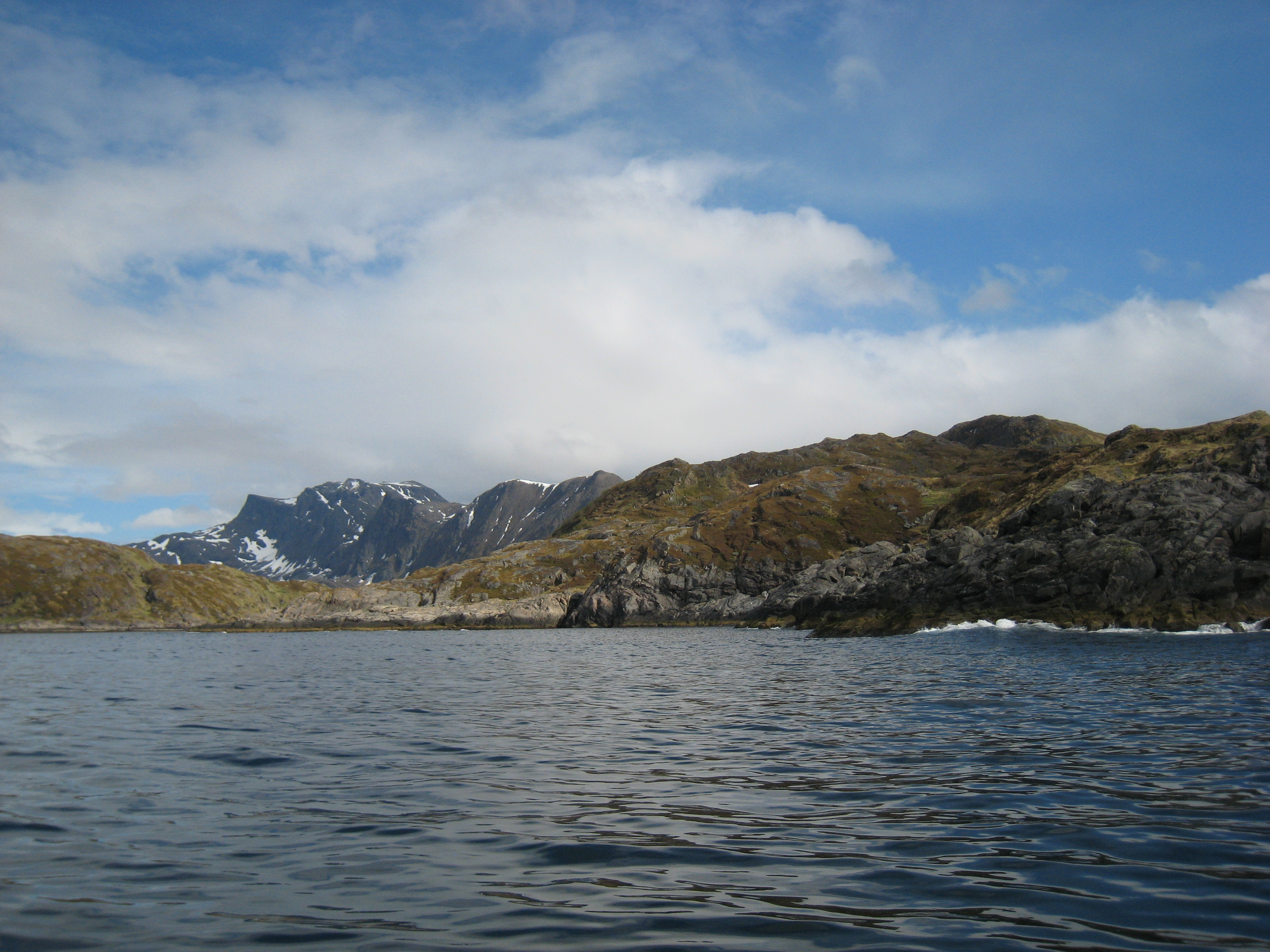
View of the island of Seiland in Sørøysund

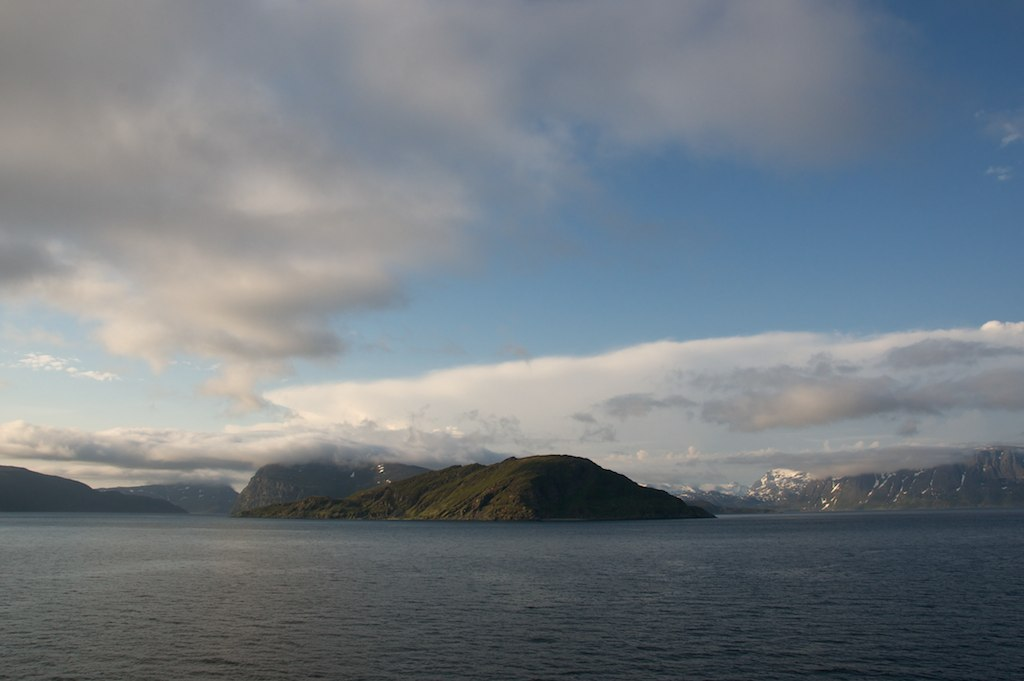
View of the Sørøysundet sound

The municipality of Hammerfest landdistrikt (lit. 'the rural district of Hammerfest') was established on 1 January 1852 when it was separated from the town of Hammerfest. The initial population of Sørøysund was 1,256. On 1 July 1869, the southern district of the municipality (population: 514) was separated from Hammerfest landdistrikt to form the new Kvalsund Municipality. This left Hammerfest landdistrikt with 932 inhabitants. On 1 January 1875, a small part of Hammerfest landdistrikt (population: 20) was transferred to the neighboring town-municipality of Hammerfest. On 1 January 1919, the name of the municipality was changed from Hammerfest landdistrikt to Sørøysund. On 1 January 1963, another small area of Sørøysund (population: 33) was transferred to the town of Hammerfest. On 1 January 1992, Sørøysund was merged into the neighbouring town-municipality of Hammerfest to form a much larger Hammerfest Municipality. Prior to the merger, Sørøysund had 2,341 inhabitants.

=== Name ===
The municipality was originally named Hammerfest landdistrikt since it was the rural district surrounding the town of Hammerfest (the town was established in 1789). The town was named after an old anchorage for boats. The first element comes from the Old Norse word hamarr which means "stone" or "steep cliff", referring to a number of large rocks, good for mooring boats. (These rocky areas were covered up in land reclaiming during the early post-war years.) The last element comes from the Old Norse word festr which means "rope" or "fastening" (for boats). The second word in the name is landdistrikt which simply means "rural district".

On 1 January 1919, the name of the municipality was changed from Hammerfest landdistrikt to Sørøysund. The new name comes from the Sørøysundet strait which flows through the municipality. The first part of Sørøysund comes from the name of the local island Sørøya (Old Norse: Suðrey). The first element of the island's name comes from the Old Norse word suðr which means "south". The last element of the island's name is ey which means "island". The second part of Sørøysund is sund which means "strait" or "sound". The Sørøysundet passes between the islands of Sørøya, Seiland, Stjernøya, and Kvaløya.

=== Coat of arms ===
The coat of arms was granted on 8 June 1979. The official blazon is "Azure, three boats argent two and one" (Norwegian: I blått tre sølv båter, 2-1). This means the arms have a blue field (background) and the charge is three boats; two smaller ones over one larger one. The boats have a tincture of argent which means they are commonly colored white, but if it is made out of metal, then silver is used. The boats were chosen to show the importance of fishing in Sørøysund. The number three also refers to the three islands in the municipality: Sørøya, Kvaløya, and Seiland. The arms were designed by Arvid Sveen.

=== Churches ===
The Church of Norway did not have any churches in Sørøysund Municipality due to its low, scattered population. It was part of the Hammerfest Church parish, which meant residents had to travel to the town of Hammerfest to attend church there.

== Geography ==
The former municipality encompassed the eastern part of the island of Sørøya, the northern part of the island of Seiland, and the northern part of Kvaløya (with the exception of the town of Hammerfest). The highest point in the municipality was the 1,078.35-metre (3,537.9 ft) tall mountain Seilandstuva on the island of Seiland. The mountain peak was on the municipal border between Sørøysund and neighboring Alta Municipality.

== Government ==
While it existed, Sørøysund Municipality was responsible for primary education (through 10th grade), outpatient health services, senior citizen services, welfare and other social services, zoning, economic development, and municipal roads and utilities. The municipality was governed by a municipal council of directly elected representatives. The mayor was indirectly elected by a vote of the municipal council. The municipality was under the jurisdiction of the Hålogaland Court of Appeal.

=== Municipal council ===
The municipal council (Kommunestyre) of Sørøysund Municipality was made up of 17 representatives that were elected to four year terms. The tables below show the historical composition of the council by political party.

Sørøysund kommunestyre 1987–1991
| Party name (in Norwegian) | Number of representatives |
|---|---|
| Labour Party (Arbeiderpartiet) | 13 |
| Conservative Party (Høyre) | 2 |
| Christian Democratic Party (Kristelig Folkeparti) | 1 |
| Centre Party (Senterpartiet) | 1 |
| Total number of members: | 17 |
Note: On 1 January 1992, Sørøysund Municipality became part of Hammerfest Municipality.

Sørøysund kommunestyre 1983–1987
| Party name (in Norwegian) | Number of representatives |
|---|---|
| Labour Party (Arbeiderpartiet) | 15 |
| Conservative Party (Høyre) | 1 |
| Socialist Left Party (Sosialistisk Venstreparti) | 1 |
| Total number of members: | 17 |

Sørøysund kommunestyre 1979–1983
| Party name (in Norwegian) | Number of representatives |
|---|---|
| Labour Party (Arbeiderpartiet) | 11 |
| Conservative Party (Høyre) | 3 |
| Communist Party (Kommunistiske Parti) | 1 |
| Christian Democratic Party (Kristelig Folkeparti) | 1 |
| Centre Party (Senterpartiet) | 1 |
| Total number of members: | 17 |

Sørøysund kommunestyre 1975–1979
| Party name (in Norwegian) | Number of representatives |
|---|---|
| Labour Party (Arbeiderpartiet) | 13 |
| Conservative Party (Høyre) | 2 |
| Christian Democratic Party (Kristelig Folkeparti) | 1 |
| Independent list (Uavhengiges liste) | 1 |
| Total number of members: | 17 |

Sørøysund kommunestyre 1971–1975
| Party name (in Norwegian) | Number of representatives |
|---|---|
| Labour Party (Arbeiderpartiet) | 10 |
| Conservative Party (Høyre) | 1 |
| Local List(s) (Lokale lister) | 6 |
| Total number of members: | 17 |

Sørøysund kommunestyre 1967–1971
| Party name (in Norwegian) | Number of representatives |
|---|---|
| Labour Party (Arbeiderpartiet) | 10 |
| Conservative Party (Høyre) | 1 |
| Local List(s) (Lokale lister) | 6 |
| Total number of members: | 17 |

Sørøysund kommunestyre 1963–1967
| Party name (in Norwegian) | Number of representatives |
|---|---|
| Labour Party (Arbeiderpartiet) | 9 |
| Conservative Party (Høyre) | 2 |
| Communist Party (Kommunistiske Parti) | 1 |
| Local List(s) (Lokale lister) | 5 |
| Total number of members: | 17 |

Sørøysund herredsstyre 1959–1963
| Party name (in Norwegian) | Number of representatives |
|---|---|
| Labour Party (Arbeiderpartiet) | 13 |
| Conservative Party (Høyre) | 2 |
| Communist Party (Kommunistiske Parti) | 2 |
| Total number of members: | 17 |

Sørøysund herredsstyre 1955–1959
| Party name (in Norwegian) | Number of representatives |
|---|---|
| Labour Party (Arbeiderpartiet) | 14 |
| Communist Party (Kommunistiske Parti) | 2 |
| Local List(s) (Lokale lister) | 1 |
| Total number of members: | 17 |

Sørøysund herredsstyre 1951–1955
| Party name (in Norwegian) | Number of representatives |
|---|---|
| Labour Party (Arbeiderpartiet) | 10 |
| Communist Party (Kommunistiske Parti) | 3 |
| Joint List(s) of Non-Socialist Parties (Borgerlige Felleslister) | 3 |
| Total number of members: | 16 |

Sørøysund herredsstyre 1947–1951
| Party name (in Norwegian) | Number of representatives |
|---|---|
| Labour Party (Arbeiderpartiet) | 11 |
| Communist Party (Kommunistiske Parti) | 5 |
| Total number of members: | 16 |

Sørøysund herredsstyre 1945–1947
| Party name (in Norwegian) | Number of representatives |
|---|---|
| Labour Party (Arbeiderpartiet) | 10 |
| Communist Party (Kommunistiske Parti) | 6 |
| Total number of members: | 16 |

Sørøysund herredsstyre 1937–1941*
| Party name (in Norwegian) | Number of representatives |
|---|---|
| Labour Party (Arbeiderpartiet) | 11 |
| Local List(s) (Lokale lister) | 5 |
| Total number of members: | 16 |
Note: Due to the German occupation of Norway during World War II, no elections were held for new municipal councils until after the war ended in 1945.

=== Mayors ===
The mayor (Norwegian: ordfører) of Sørøysund Municipality was the political leader of the municipality and the chairperson of the municipal council. The following people have held this position:

- 1852–1854: Carl Gustav Pape
- 1854–1859: Christoffer Lund
- 1859–1861: P.C. Dass
- 1861–1866: Ole Johan Reinholdtsen
- 1866–1868: Sven Eriksen
- 1868–1870: Andreas Hinberg
- 1870–1872: Mathis J. Utzi
- 1872–1872: Nils Mikkelsen
- 1873–1873: Andreas Hinberg
- 1874–1875: Magnus Larsen
- 1875–1903: Nils Myhre Olsen
- 1904–1909: Johan Edvard Jacobsen
- 1909–1916: Normann Pedersen
- 1916–1922: Haldor Antonsen
- 1923–1925: Øyvind Jacobsen
- 1926–1928: Normann Pedersen
- 1929–1938: Kristian Berg
- 1938–1941: Oscar Ragnvald Hansen
- 1941–1943: Øyvind Jacobsen
- 1945–1951: Peder Johansen
- 1952–1959: Oscar Kaarby
- 1960–1963: Rolf Zachariassen
- 1964–1973: Ragnar Zachariassen
- 1974–1977: Harder Johansen
- 1977–1978: Odd Svendsen
- 1978–1979: Helmer Olsen
- 1980–1985: Alf Birger Olsen
- 1986–1987: Frank Holm
- 1988–1992: Mimmi Bæivi (Ap)

== See also ==
- List of former municipalities of Norway
