= Hammerfest FK =

Norwegian football club

Hammerfest
- Full name: Hammerfest Fotballklubb
- Founded: 18 December 1994
- Dissolved: 2017
- Ground: Breidablikk stadion, Rypefjord, Hammerfest
- Chairman: Hans Kristian Slinning
- Manager: Frode "Juf" Johansen
- League: 4. Divisjon
- 2017: 4. Divisjon, 4th
Home colours	Away colours

Hammerfest Fotballklubb is a Norwegian football club from Hammerfest Municipality, founded on 18 December 1994 as a merger between HIF/Stein and Indrefjord IL.

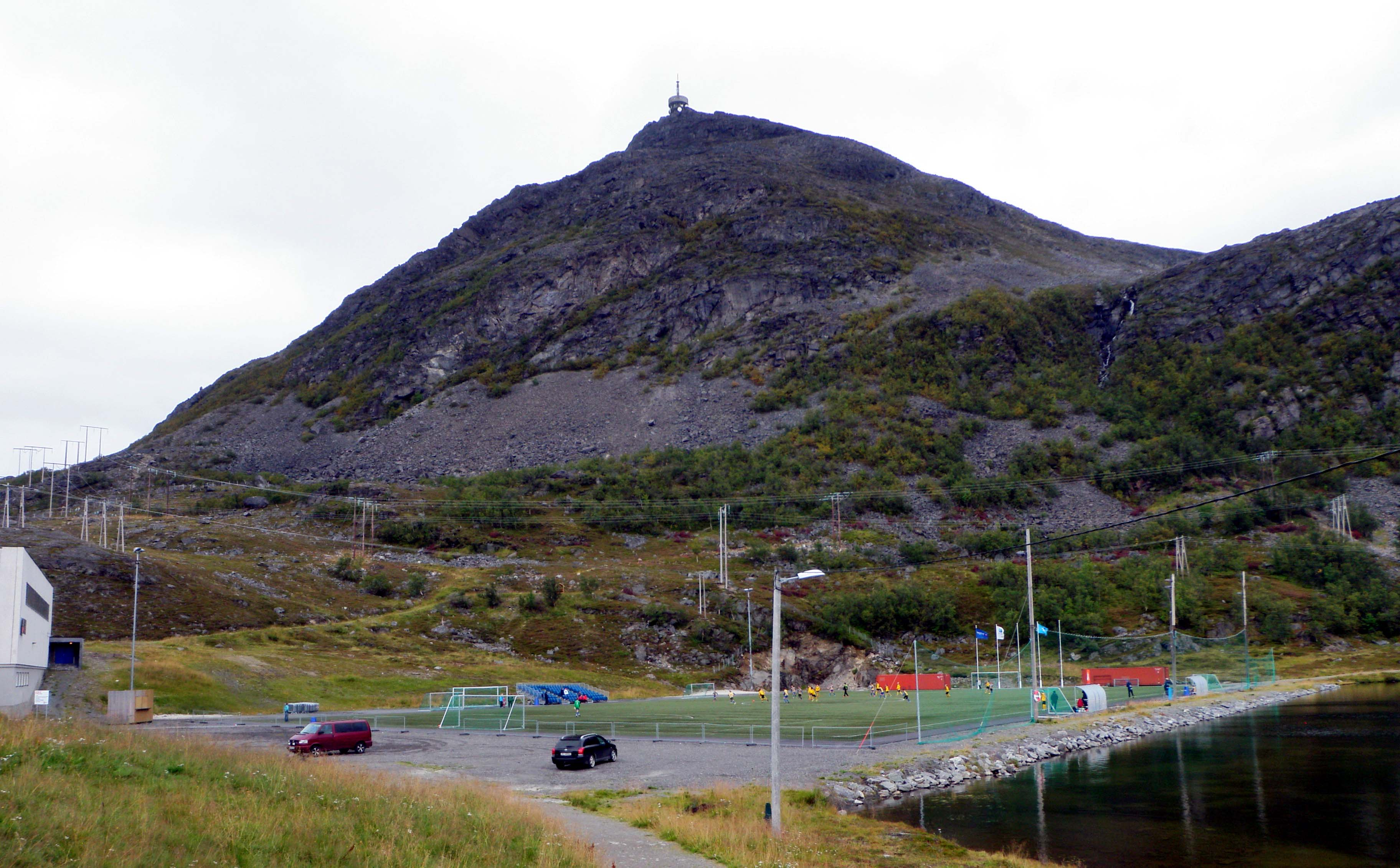
Breidablikk stadion

The men's team currently plays in the Third Division (fourth tier of Norwegian football), having last played in the Second Division in 2007. Since its formation in 1994, its other seasons in the Second Division came in 1998, 1999, 2001, 2002, 2003, and 2006. In 2018, the club merged with HIF-Stein to create a new team called HIF-Stein.

== Recent history ==
Season		Pos.	Pl.	W	D	L	GS	GA	P	Cup	Notes
2000	D3	1	22	20	1	1	139	21	61		Promoted to 2. Division
2001	D2	11	26	8	4	14	44	58	28	1st round	
2002	D2	10	26	7	9	10	52	58	30	2nd round	
2003	D2	12	26	9	2	15	43	75	29	2nd round	Relegated to 3. Division
2004	D3	3	22	14	3	5	74	34	45		
2005	D3	1	22	17	3	2	76	19	54		Promoted to 2. Division
2006	D2	11	26	8	5	13	35	50	29	2nd round	
2007	D2	14	26	7	1	18	23	69	22	1st round	Relegated to 3. Division
2008	D3	4	22	11	3	8	71	38	36	1st qualifying round	
2009	D3	2	20	12	4	4	66	30	40	1st qualifying round	
2010	D3	4	22	11	5	6	61	38	38	1st round	
2011	D3	7	22	9	3	10	42	45	30	1st round	
2012	D3	5	22	12	1	9	56	40	37	1st qualifying round	
2013	D3	5	22	10	1	11	58	54	31	1st qualifying round	
2014	D3	5	22	11	3	8	43	34	36	1st qualifying round	
2015	D3	9	22	7	2	13	31	54	23	2nd qualifying round	
2016	D3	11	22	4	1	17	26	62	13	1st qualifying round	Relegated to 4. Division
2017	D4	4	22	11	3	8	43	27	36	2nd qualifying round	

Janis Vaitkus before are play professional level in FK Ventspils (Latvia), FK Tauras (Lithuania), FC Nuorese (Italy).Janis Vaitkus is the only player from FK Hammerfest to play in the European Cup before.Janis Vaitkus still play in club.
