= List of shipwrecks in April 1882 =

The list of shipwrecks in April 1882 includes ships sunk, foundered, grounded, or otherwise lost during April 1882.

== 1 April ==
List of shipwrecks: 1 April 1882
Ship	State	Description
RMS Douro, and Yrurac Bat	United Kingdom; Spain	The passenger ship RMS Douro collided with the steamship Yrurac Bat in the Bay of Biscay off the northwest coast of Spain and sank with the loss of six lives. Nine people were reported missing from RMS Douro, which had 80 crew and 55 passengers on board. Yrurac Bat also sank with the loss of 53 lives. Twenty-nine people were reported missing. One hundred and twenty survivors from both vessels were rescued by the steamship Hidalgo (United Kingdom). RMS Douro was on a voyage from Brazil to Southampton, Hampshire. Yrurat Bat was on a voyage from Liverpool, Lancashire to Puerto Rico.

== 2 April ==
List of shipwrecks: 2 April 1882
Ship	State	Description
Ellen William	United Kingdom	The schooner was driven ashore in Ardmore Bay. Her crew were rescued by rocket apparatus.
Helena	Norway	The ship was driven ashore at "Stetterage". She was on a voyage from Kragerø to Aarhus, Denmark.
Little Dick	United Kingdom	The dandy capsized in the English Channel 1 1/2 nautical miles (2.8 km) off Seaford, Sussex. Her three crew were rescued.
Ringwood	Canada	The barque was driven ashore and wrecked at Saint-Pierre, Saint Pierre and Miquelon. Her crew were rescued.

== 3 April ==
List of shipwrecks: 3 April 1882
Ship	State	Description
Elizabeth	United Kingdom	The brig ran aground and was wrecked at Howth, County Dublin. Her crew were rescued by the Howth Lifeboat. She was on a voyage from Liverpool, Lancashire to Dundalk, County Louth.
Ellen	United Kingdom	The sloop was driven ashore and wrecked at Cemlyn, Anglesey.
Europe	France	The barque ran aground on the Goodwin Sands, Kent, United Kingdom and was abandoned by her eleven crew, who took to two boats. Five crew in one boat was picked up by a tug off the South Foreland, Kent. Six crew in the second boat were reported missing. Europe was on a voyage from Bordeaux, Gironde to Gothenburg, Sweden.
John Morell	United Kingdom	The schooner sank at Milford Haven, Pembrokeshire.
Lucie	Germany	The barque was driven ashore and wrecked at Lydd, Kent.
Sapho	Brazil	The brigantine was run down and sunk by the steamship Olaf (Denmark). Her crew were rescued.

== 4 April ==
List of shipwrecks: 4 April 1882
Ship	State	Description
Saint Maur	United Kingdom	The ship was sighted whilst on a voyage from Calcutta, India to Liverpool, Lancashire. No further trace, reported missing.

== 5 April ==
List of shipwrecks: 5 April 1882
Ship	State	Description
Caroline Guessing	Norway	The barque was driven ashore on Terschelling, Friesland, Netherlands. At least some of her crew survived; they took to a boat and landed on Ameland, Friesland. She was on a voyage from Drammen to Purmerend, North Holland, Netherlands.
Ecliptica	Netherlands	The galiot struck a sunken wreck. She put in to Leith, Lothian, United Kingdom in a leaky condition. She was on a voyage from Amsterdam, North Holland to Berwick upon Tweed, Northumberland, United Kingdom.
Gleam	United Kingdom	The barque was wrecked at Port Nolloth, Cape Colony with the loss of five of her crew. She was on a voyage from Swansea, Glamorgan to Port Nolloth.
Invicta	United Kingdom	The ship ran aground on the Queenborough Spit, in the River Medway. She was on a voyage form Stoke, Kent to Newcastle upon Tyne, Northumberland.

== 7 April ==
List of shipwrecks: 7 April 1882
Ship	State	Description
Noa	United Kingdom	The steamship suffered a boiler explosion and sank at Amlwch, Anglesey with the loss of all three crew.

== 8 April ==
List of shipwrecks: 8 April 1882
Ship	State	Description
Capricorn	United Kingdom	The barque caught fire at the Isla de los Estados and was scuttled. She was on a voyage from Swansea, Glamorgan to Valparaíso, Chile. She was later refloated with assistance and taken in to Stanley, Falkland Islands.

== 9 April ==
List of shipwrecks: 9 April 1882
Ship	State	Description
Hope	United Kingdom	The ship departed from Greenock, Renfrewshire for Quebec City, Canada. No further trace, reported missing.

== 10 April ==
List of shipwrecks: 10 April 1882
Ship	State	Description
Larpool	United Kingdom	The steamship ran aground at Kertch, Russia and was damaged. She was refloated on 13 April and towed in to Kertch.
Mary Tatham	United Kingdom	The steamship was driven ashore and wrecked on Yezo, Japan. Her crew survived. She was on a voyage from Nagasaki, Japan to Portland, Oregon, United States.

== 11 April ==
List of shipwrecks: 11 April 1882
Ship	State	Description
Driver, and Forager	United Kingdom	The smack Driver collided with Forager 10 nautical miles (19 km) off Filey, Yorkshire. Both vessels were severely damaged.

== 12 April ==
List of shipwrecks: 12 April 1882
Ship	State	Description
David Jenkins	United Kingdom	The schooner ran aground in the Thames Estuary off Shoeburyness, Essex. She was on a voyage from an Irish port to London.
Orenoque	France	The ship departed from Troon, Ayrshire, United Kingdom for Trinidad. No further trace, reported missing.
Sophie Cook	United Kingdom	The brig was abandoned in the Pacific Ocean. Her crew took to the boats and landed at Corral and Valdivia, Chile. She was on a voyage from Antofagasta, Chile to Genoa, Kingdom of Italy.

== 13 April ==
List of shipwrecks: 13 April 1882
Ship	State	Description
Danmark	Denmark	The ship ran aground off Wells-next-the-Sea, Norfolk, United Kingdom. She was on a voyage from Stettin, Germany to Dunkerque, Nord, France. She put in to Grimsby, Lincolnshire, United Kingdom in a leaky condition.
Janetta	United Kingdom	The schooner was damaged by fire in the Belfast Lough.

== 14 April ==
List of shipwrecks: 14 April 1882
Ship	State	Description
Alpha	United Kingdom	The brig was driven ashore at Newbiggin Point, Northumberland. Her crew were rescued by rocket apparatus. She was on a voyage from Sunderland, County Durham to London.
Diana	Germany	The steamship was run into by the steamship Vernon (United Kingdom) and sank at Libava, Courland Governorate. Her crew were rescued.
Ida, and Noatum	Denmark; Norway	The brig Noatum collided with the barque Ida and sank in the English Channel off Beachy Head, Sussex, United Kingdom. Her crew were rescued by Ida. Noatum was on a voyage from Galveston, Texas, United States to Hamburg, Germany. Ida was on a voyage from Helsingør to Rio de Janeiro, Brazil. She was towed in to Dover, Kent, United Kingdom in a waterlogged condition by the tug Rescue (United Kingdom).

== 15 April ==
List of shipwrecks: 15 April 1882
Ship	State	Description
Ella Constance	United Kingdom	The steamship ran ashore near Dunvegan, Isle of Skye, Outer Hebrides. She was on a voyage from Liverpool, Lancashire to Copenhagen, Denmark. She was refloated and beached in Loch Bay, where she sank at the stern.

== 17 April ==
List of shipwrecks: 17 April 1882
Ship	State	Description
Harkus	Russia	The brig was damaged by fire at Pärnu.
Thomas Fisher	United Kingdom	The ship departed from Seville, Spain for Irvine, Ayrshire. No further trace, reported missing.
Zeta	United Kingdom	The barque was wrecked at Antofagasta, Chile. Her seventeen crew were rescued.

== 18 April ==
List of shipwrecks: 18 April 1882
Ship	State	Description
Paola	Germany	The steamship sank in the River Guadiana near Pomaron, Portugal. She was refloated on 28 April.
Saffron	United Kingdom	The barque was driven ashore in Lofsta Bay, Sweden.
Several unnamed vessels	Flags unknown	The ships were driven ashore at Gävle, Sweden.

== 19 April ==
List of shipwrecks: 19 April 1882
Ship	State	Description
Geneva	Germany	The steamship ran aground on the Drummond Rock. She was on a voyage from Hamburg to Dundee, Forfarshire, United Kingdom. She was refloated and taken in to Dundee.
Robert and Paul	Germany	The brigantine was driven ashore and wrecked on Texel, North Holland, Netherlands.

== 21 April ==
List of shipwrecks: 21 April 1882
Ship	State	Description
Rochdale	United Kingdom	The ship was damaged by fire at Sebastopol, Russia.

== 22 April ==
List of shipwrecks: 22 April 1882
Ship	State	Description
Brilliant Star	United Kingdom	The barquentine was driven ashore and wrecked at "Beravik", Iceland. Her seven crew survived but one subsequently died of exposure. She was on a voyage from Fleetwood, Lancashire to Iceland.
Jehu	United Kingdom	The ship was wrecked off Margate, Kent during a gale. Her crew were presumed dead.
Unnamed vessel	Flag unknown	The ship was wrecked off Margate during a gale.

== 23 April ==
List of shipwrecks: 23 April 1882
Ship	State	Description
Little Eagle	United States	The tow steamer struck a bridge pier near Hannibal, Missouri and sank in the Mississippi River. Three people were drowned.

== 24 April ==
List of shipwrecks: 24 April 1882
Ship	State	Description
St Vincent	United Kingdom	The barque struck the Spanish Ledges, at the entrance to St Mary's Sound in the Isles of Scilly and sank. Her crew escaped, but there was much embarrassment as she was carrying a St Agnes pilot. She was on a voyage from St Vincent to London with sugar.

== 25 April ==
List of shipwrecks: 25 April 1882
Ship	State	Description
City of Stanford	United States	The sternwheeler was destroyed by fire 4 nautical miles (7.4 km) from Jacksonville, Florida with the loss of eleven lives.
Ion	United Kingdom	The schooner was driven ashore at Penedo, Brazil. She was on a vouyage from Penedo to Liverpool, Lancashire.
Mary and Anne	United Kingdom	The schooner was run down by the steamship Sceptre (United Kingdom) and sank in the River Thames near Gravesend, Kent. Her three crew were rescued by Sceptre. Mary and Anne was on a voyage from London to Goole, Yorkshire.
Veritas	Germany	The barque was abandoned in the Atlantic Ocean. Her crew were rescued by the barque Huron (United Kingdom). Veritas was on a voyage from London, United Kingdom to Miramichi, New Brunswick, Canada.

== 27 April ==
List of shipwrecks: 27 April 1882
Ship	State	Description
Austral	United Kingdom	The steamship ran aground in Cartsdyke Bay. She was refloated.
Canoma	United Kingdom	The ship departed from Sunderland, County Durham for Java, Netherlands East Indies. No further trace, reported missing.
Foudroyant	France	The Dévastation-class ironclad ran aground on being launched at Toulon, Var.

== 28 April ==
List of shipwrecks: 28 April 1882
Ship	State	Description
Acastus	United Kingdom	The brigantine ran aground on the Gunfleet Sand, in the North Sea off the coast of Essex. She was on a voyage from Gravesend, Kent to Middlesbrough, Yorkshire. She was refloated and taken in to Whitstable, Kent.
Acron Queen	United Kingdom	The schooner collided with another vessel and was abandoned off Ballywalter, County Antrim. She was towed in to Belfast by the tug Shamrock (United Kingdom).
Elizabeth Mary Ann	United Kingdom	The ship ran aground at Shoreham-by-Sea, Sussex and sprang a leak. She was refloated and taken in to Shoreham-by-Sea.
Florence	United Kingdom	The fishing smack was driven ashore at Lydd, Kent. Her crew survived.
Little Anne	United Kingdom	The fishing smack was driven ashore and wrecked at Lydd. Her crew survived.

== 29 April ==
List of shipwrecks: 29 April 1882
Ship	State	Description
Acadie	Netherlands	The ship ran aground at Maracaibo, Venezuela. She was on a voyage from Maracaibo to the English Channel. She was refloated and put back to Maracaibo in a severely leaky condition.
Drumhendry	United Kingdom	The steamship was driven ashore in St Ives Bay under Wheal Lucy mine while carrying dynamite from Ireland to Hayle, Cornwall. Her crew were hauled ashore on a rope and her captain and mate were picked up by the Hayle Lifeboat.
George Andrews	United Kingdom	The brig sprang a leak and foundered in the North Sea, Her crew were rescued by a brigantine. She was on a voyage from Sunderland, County Durham to Portsmouth, Hampshire.
Martinet	United Kingdom	The ship departed from the River Tyne for Cherbourg, Manche, France. No further trace, reported missing.

== 30 April ==
List of shipwrecks: 30 April 1882
Ship	State	Description
Adolf	Germany	The brig sprang a leak and was abandoned. Her crew were rescued by the barque Norden (Norway). Adolf was on a voyage.
Fame	United Kingdom	The derelict brigantine foundered off Spurn Point, Yorkshire.
Orianda	United Kingdom	The steamship struck a sunken rock off Cape St. Vincent, Portugal. She was on a voyage from Elba, Italy to Newcastle upon Tyne, Northumberland. She put in to Cádiz, Spain.

== Unknown date ==
List of shipwrecks: Unknown date in April 1882
Ship	State	Description
Albert	France	The fishing vessel was wrecked on the coast of Iceland. Her crew were rescued.
Canonbury	United Kingdom	The steamship ran aground in the Suez Canal. She had been refloated by 10 April and taken in to Ismailia, Egypt for temporary repairs.
Carl	Germany	The brig was driven ashore and wrecked at "Caravellos". She was on a voyage from Rio de Janeiro to Bahia, Brazil.
Carlotta	United Kingdom	The brigantine foundered in the North Sea 10 nautical miles (19 km) off the West Hinder Bank. Her crew survived. She was on a voyage from Ghent, East Flanders, Belgium to London.
Charlotte	Denmark	The schooner was wrecked on the coast of Iceland. Her crew were rescued.
Constantine	United Kingdom	The steamship was driven ashore at Hammaren, Bornholm, Denmark. She was later refloated and taken in to Copenhagen, Denmark.
Dunkerquoise	France	The fishing vessel was wrecked on the coast of Iceland. Her crew were rescued.
Ebenezer	United Kingdom	The schooner was wrecked at Seaton, County Durham. She was on a voyage from Stavanger, Norway to Blyth, Northumberland.
Edith Weir	United Kingdom	The schooner was driven ashore and wrecked on "Blanch Island", Nova Scotia, Canada.
Eleni Vaglianou	Greece	The ship ran aground at Yekaterinodar, Russia and sprang a leak.
Elizabeth	United Kingdom	The schooner was driven ashore at Dunnet Head, Caithness. Eight crew were rescued. She was on a voyage from Hamburg, Germany to Liverpool, Lancashire.
Emil	Russia	The barque ran aground on the Oregrund, in the Baltic Sea. She was on a voyage from Gävle, Sweden to the Bristol Channel.
Erna	Norway	The abandoned barque was towed in to Madeira in a waterlogged condition by the tugs Falcon and Hawk (both Portugal).
Fort George	United Kingdom	The barque foundered at sea. Her crew were rescued. She was on a voyage from Liverpool to Valparaíso, Chile.
Garstanb	United Kingdom	The ship was lost whilst on a voyage from Newcastle, New South Wales to Amoy, China. Her crew were rescued.
Golden City	United States	The steamship caught fire at Memphis, Tennessee, and became a total wreck with the loss of 35 lives.
Grahams Polley	United States	The ship was destroyed by fire at New York.
Hartlepool	United Kingdom	The ship ran aground in the River Usk and broke her back. She was on a voyage from Newport to Saint-Nazaire, Ille-et-Vilaine, France.
Henrietta	United Kingdom	The ship ran aground on the Cork Sand, in the North Sea off the coast of Essex. Her crew were rescued by the Harwich Lifeboat Springwell II ( Royal National Lifeboat Institution), performing her first rescue.
Mirtle	United Kingdom	The ship foundered 35 nautical miles (65 km) off Waterford. Her crew survived. She was on a voyage from Llanelly, Glamorgan to Youghal, County Cork.
Pensée	France	The fishing vessel was wrecked on the coast of Iceland. Her crew were rescued.
Pride of the West	(Dominion of Newfoundland) Newfoundland Colony	The ship was abandoned in ice. She was on a voyage from Figueira da Foz, Portugal to Saint John's.
Promise	United Kingdom	The ship was lost whilst on a voyage from the Newfoundland Colony to a European port.
Providence	United Kingdom	The tug collided with the steamship C. W. Anderson (United Kingdom) and sank at the mouth of the River Tyne. Her crew were rescued.
Richelieu	United Kingdom	The steamship was damaged by fire at Saint-Louis, Senegal on or before 2 April.
Secunda	Germany	The steamship was driven ashore in the Black Sea. She was refloated and taken in to Sebastopol, Russia for repairs.
Teutonia	United Kingdom	The steamship was damaged by fire at Trieste. She was on a voyage from Bombay, India to Venice, Italy.
Upperud	Norway	The schooner ran aground on a reef in the Baltic Sea and sank. Her crew were rescued.
Victoria	Norway	The brig ran aground on Saltholm, Denmark. She was on a voyage from Kristiansand to Pärnu, Russia. She was refloated with assistance.
