= Lille-Kamøya, Hammerfest =

Island in Norway

Lille-Kamøya
- Interactive map of Lille-Kamøya

Geography
- Location: Finnmark, Norway
- Coordinates: 70.8539°N 23.0644°E
- Area: 0.6 km^{2} (0.23 sq mi)
- Length: 1.7 km (1.06 mi)
- Width: 450 m (1480 ft)
- Highest elevation: 222 m (728 ft)
- Highest point: Litlestauren

Administration
- Norway
- County: Finnmark
- Municipality: Hammerfest Municipality

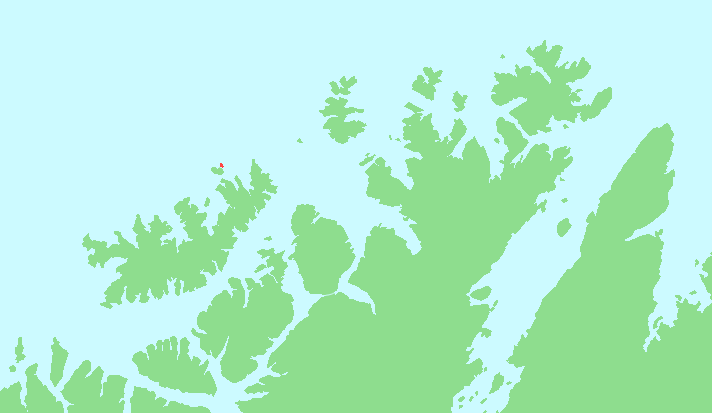
Location of Lille-Karmøya in Norway

Lille-Kamøya is an uninhabited mountainous island in Hammerfest Municipality in Finnmark county, Norway. The island is north of the islands of Kamøya and Sørøya and has an area of about 0.6 square kilometres (0.23 sq mi). The highest point on the island is the 222-metre (728 ft) tall mountain Litlestauren.

Lille-Karmøya has the largest shag colony in Norway. The island and surrounding sea are protected as Lille-Karmøya Nature Reserve.

== See also ==
- List of islands of Norway
