= Kamøya =

Island in Hammerfest, Norway

- Interactive map of Kamøya

Geography
- Location: Finnmark, Norway
- Coordinates: 70.8373°N 23.0414°E
- Area: 4.31 km^{2} (1.66 sq mi)
- Length: 3.7 km (2.3 mi)
- Width: 1.7 km (1.06 mi)
- Highest elevation: 402 m (1319 ft)

Administration
- Norway
- County: Finnmark
- Municipality: Hammerfest Municipality

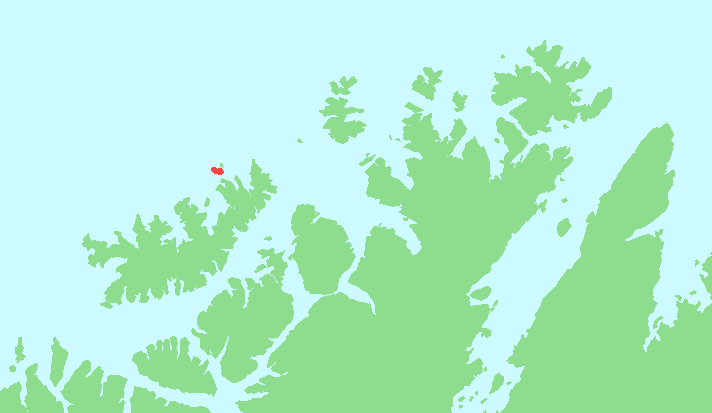
Location of Store Kamøya within Finnmark, Norway

Kamøya (or unofficially: Store Kamøya) is an uninhabited island in Hammerfest Municipality in Finnmark county, Norway. The 4.3-square-kilometre (1.7 sq mi) island is north of the large island of Sørøya and just a little south of Lille-Kamøya. The island is home to many bird cliff nesting areas.

== See also ==
- List of islands of Norway
