= Gunnar Garfors =

Norwegian traveller and author

- Born: 29 May 1975 (age 51); Hammerfest, Norway
- Education: Bachelor of Arts, Master of Management
- Occupations: Traveller, author, media advisor
- Spouse: Jacquelyn Kunz
- Writing career
- Language: Norwegian, English
- Website: garfors.com

Gunnar Garfors (born 29 May 1975) is a Norwegian traveler, author, media professional, and public speaker. The first person to visit every country in the world twice, he holds a range of travel world records and has written several travel books. He has also worked in broadcasting and new media developments since 2001.

== Personal life ==
Garfors is the eldest of seven children. He was born in Hammerfest in Northern Norway but soon moved to Naustdal on the country's west coast where he grew up with his mother Ruth Berit Stensletten Garfors, his father Reidar Magne Garfors, and his six siblings. He has also lived in Havøysund, Førde, Dublin, Falmouth, Copenhagen, and Taipei. He now lives in Oslo with his wife, American traveller Jacquelyn Kunz.

Garfors holds a bachelor's degree (Hons) from Falmouth College of Arts in Great Britain and a Master of Management degree from the Norwegian School of Management.

Playing football in his youth, Garfors transferred from IL Tambarskjelvar to Førde IL after the 1993 season had concluded. In 1995 he among others scored all 7 goals in a 7–2 victory over Eid. He ended on 19 goals in 1995, finishing third in the top goalscorer table in his Third Division group. In August 1996 he scored twice in an 8–1 victory over Høyang before leaving for his studies in England.

== Travels and world records ==
On 18 June 2012, Garfors and Adrian Butterworth set a Guinness World Record by being the first people to visit five continents in the same day. Garfors, Øystein Djupvik, and Tay-young Pak set a record in September 2014 by visiting 19 countries in 24 hours. Garfors set another Guinness World Record on 2 February 2018 when he circumnavigated the world via the six inhabited continents on scheduled aircraft in 56 hours and 56 minutes together with Dutchmen Erik de Zwart and Ronald Haanstra. On 16 December 2018, he became the first person to visit all 198 countries (including states recognized by at least 10 UN members) in the world twice.

== Writing ==
Garfors has written several travel books, including Ingenstad which has featured as a Norwegian bestseller. Garfors wrote a bimonthly travel column in the Japanese newspaper Mainichi Shimbun from 2013 to 2015 and occasionally wrote travel articles for The Guardian.

=== Bibliography ===
- 198: Mi reise til alle verdas land, Samlaget, Norway (2014)
- Ete fysst, Selja, Norway (2014)
- 198: How I Ran Out of Countries, self-published, USA (2015)
- Ingenstad, Skald, Norway (2019)
- Bortom allfarveg, Skald, Norway (2021)
- 198: Como eu conheci todos os países do mundo, self-published, Brazil (2021)
- Bortom allfarveg Vestlandet, Skald, Norway (2022)
- Omakase, Spartacus, Norway (2022)
- Ahol csak a madár jár, Cser Kiadó, Hungary (2023)
- Elsewhere, Broken Sleep Books, UK (2024)

== Broadcasting ==
He worked as an advisor for broadcasting and new media at the Norwegian Broadcasting Corporation (NRK) in Oslo from 2000 to 2022, was president of the International DMB Advancement Group from 2010 to 2021 and sat one year as vice president of the mobile expert group of the European Broadcasting Union in 2008 and 2009. In 2004, he was director when NRK launched the first test of live TV to mobile phones.

From 2008 to 2013, Garfors was CEO of Norwegian Mobile TV Corporation.
