= Coat of arms of Hammerfest =

“Gules a polar bear passant Argent, for a crest a mural crown Or”

The municipal coat of arms of Hammerfest was approved by Royal Resolution in 1938 and adopted on 25 March 1939. It was created by the local teacher Ole Valle.

Hammerfest received town status in 1789 but a coat of arms was not made at that time. In 1936 the issue was addressed to the municipal council by local historian Jørgen Sivertsen and work towards creating one was initiated. Several designs were considered but the decision fell on a polar bear on red. The polar bear is not indigenous to mainland Norway, but symbolises the town's status as an important port in the polar region of the Norwegian Sea.

The design has been revised several times, most recently in 2001 by the artist Arvid Sveen.
