= Hammaren =

Mountain in Finnmark, Norway

- Location of the mountain

Highest point
- Elevation: 165 m (541 ft)
- Prominence: 75 m (246 ft)
- Coordinates: 70°41′53″N 23°58′13″E

Geography
- Location: Finnmark, Norway

Hammaren is a small mountain in Hammerfest Municipality in Finnmark county in northern Norway. The 165-metre (541 ft) tall mountain is located on the northern coast of the island Kvaløya, about 12 kilometres (7.5 mi) east of the town of Hammerfest.
