= Hammerfest Municipality =

Municipality in Finnmark, Norway

Hammerfest Municipality Hammerfest kommune Hámmerfeastta suohkan
- Municipality
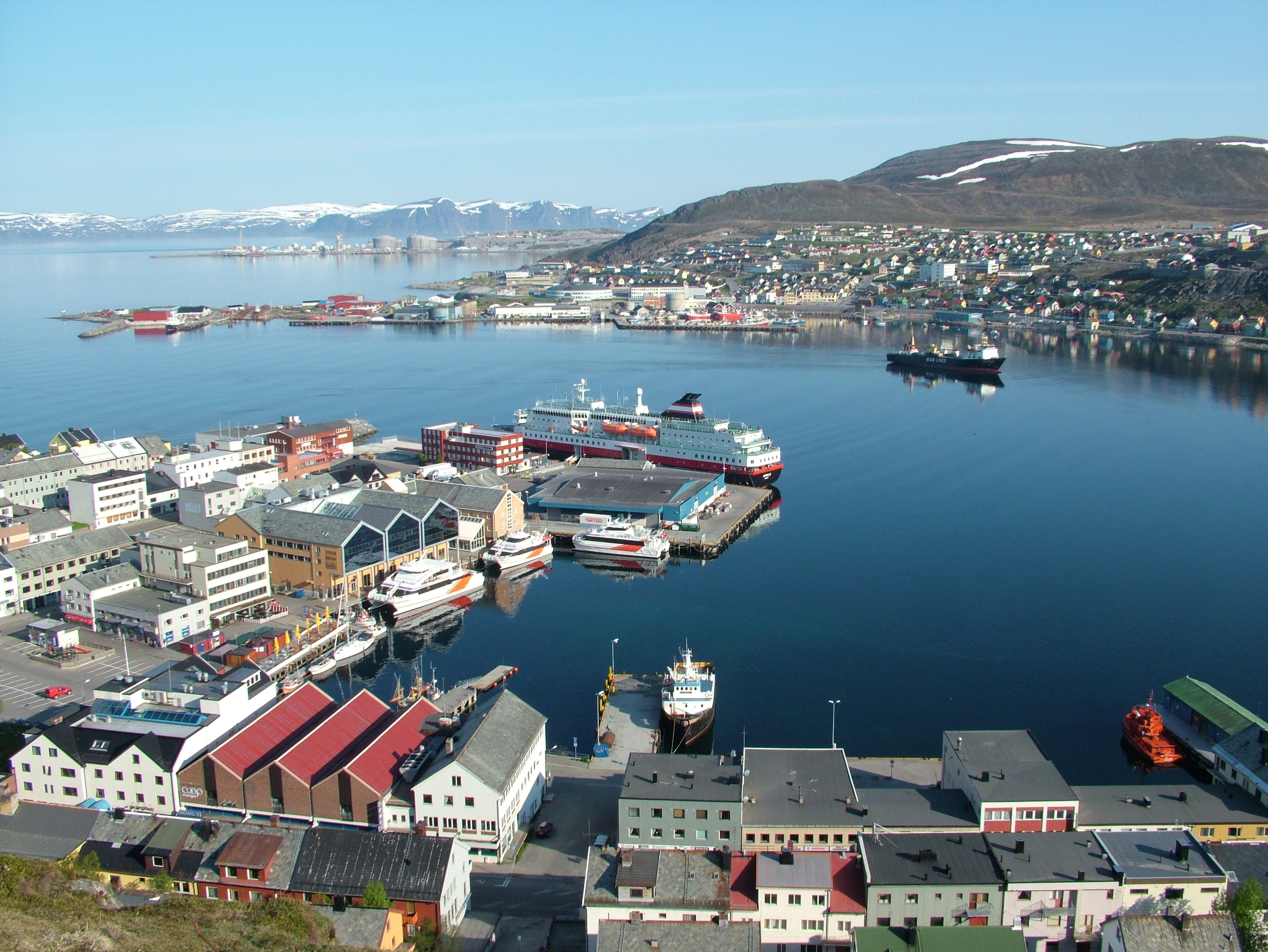
- View of Hammerfest in mid-June 2005

- Flag Coat of arms

- Finnmark within Norway

- Hammerfest within Finnmark
- Coordinates: 70°39′45″N 23°41′00″E
- Country: Norway
- County: Finnmark
- District: Vest-Finnmark
- Established: 1 Jan 1838
  - Created as: Formannskapsdistrikt
- Administrative centre: Hammerfest

Government
  - Mayor (2023): Terje Rogde (H)

Area
  - Total: 2,692.81 km^{2} (1,039.70 sq mi)
  - Land: 2,557.83 km^{2} (987.58 sq mi)
  - Water: 134.98 km^{2} (52.12 sq mi) 5%
  - Rank: #19 in Norway
- Highest elevation: 1,078 m (3,537 ft)

Population (2024)
  - Total: 11,338
  - Rank: #103 in Norway
  - Density: 4.2/km^{2} (11/sq mi)
  - Change (10 years): no change%
- Demonym: Hammerfesting

Official language
  - Norwegian form: Neutral
- Time zone: UTC+01:00 (CET)
  - Summer (DST): UTC+02:00 (CEST)
- ISO 3166 code: NO-5603
- Website: Official website

Hammerfest (Northern Sami: Hámmerfeasta [ˈhaːmmerˌfea̯sːta]) is a municipality in Finnmark county, Norway. The administrative centre of the municipality being the town of Hammerfest which is considered the northernmost town in the world with more than 5,000 inhabitants. Some of the main villages in the municipality include Rypefjord, Kvalsund, Forsøl, Hønsebybotn, Akkarfjord i Kvaløya, Akkarfjord i Sørøya, and Kårhamn.

The 2,693-square-kilometre (1,040 sq mi) municipality is the 19th largest by area out of the 357 municipalities in Norway. Hammerfest is the 103rd most populous municipality in Norway with a population of 11,338. The municipality's population density is 4.2 inhabitants per square kilometre (11/sq mi) and its population has increased by 0% over the previous 10-year period.

The municipality encompasses parts of three large islands: Kvaløya, Sørøya, and Seiland. Other small islands such as Håja, Lille Kamøya and Kamøya are also located here. Most parts of the municipality do not have a road connection with the rest of Norway; only Kvaløya island is connected to the mainland, via the Kvalsund Bridge.

The town of Hammerfest is considered to be one of the northernmost city/towns in the world. For more information, see Hammerfest.

== General information ==
A municipality called Hammerfest by og landdistrikt (Hammerfest town and district) was established on 1 January 1838 (see formannskapsdistrikt law), which included the town of Hammerfest and the vast rural district surrounding it. The law at that time required that all towns should be separated from their rural districts, but because of low population and very few voters, this was impossible to carry out for Hammerfest in 1838. (This was also the case in the nearby towns of Vadsø and Vardø.) In 1839, the northern part of Hammerfest (population: 498) was separated to become a new Maasø Municipality. This left Hammerfest by og landdistrikt with 2,024 residents. On 1 January 1852, the rural district outside of the town (population: 1,256) was separated from the town to form the new Hammerfest landdistrikt Municipality. This left the town of Hammerfest with 1,125 residents. (The rural Hammerfest landdistrikt was later divided into two municipalities: Sørøysund Municipality in the north and Kvalsund Municipality in the south.)

On 1 January 1992, Sørøysund Municipality (population: 2,341) was merged with the town of Hammerfest (population: 6,909) to form a new, larger municipality that was called Hammerfest Municipality.

In 2017, the neighboring Hammerfest Municipality and Kvalsund Municipality voted to merge into one large municipality effective 1 January 2020, and that merger came into effect on the planned date. Also on the same day, the new municipality became part of the newly formed Troms og Finnmark county. Previously, it had been part of the old Finnmark county. On 1 January 2024, the Troms og Finnmark county was divided and the municipality once again became part of Finnmark county.

=== Name ===
The municipality is named after the town of Hammerfest, which was established in 1789. The town was named after an old anchorage. The first element of the name is derived from the local Hamran (Old Norse: Hamarr). Hamran were a number of large rocks, good for mooring boats in the local harbour. The name comes from the word hamarr which means "stone", "steep cliff", or "rock face". The local Hamran were covered up in land reclaiming during the early years after World War II. The last element of the name comes from the word festr which means "rope" or "fastening" (for boats).

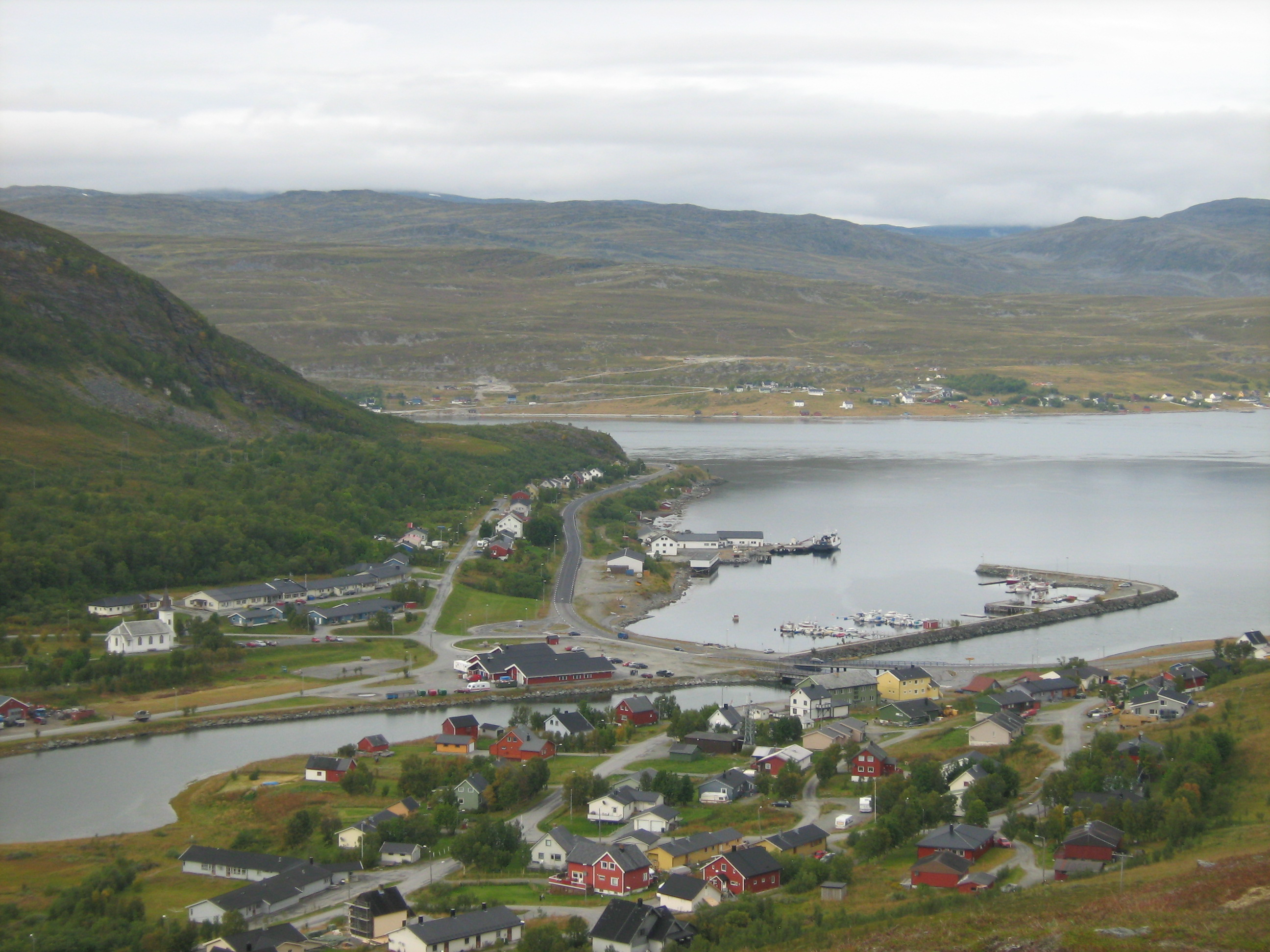
Kvalsund, part of Hammerfest municipality since 2020

On 1 January 2020 when the neighboring Hammerfest Municipality and Kvalsund Municipality were merged, the new municipality chose two parallel, bilingual, interchangeable names: Hammerfest kommune (Norwegian) and Hámmerfeastta suohkan (Northern Sami). The Sami language name spelling changes depending on how it is used. It is called Hámmerfeasta when it is spelled alone, but it is Hámmerfeastta suohkan when using the Sami language equivalent to "Hammerfest Municipality". Beside the official Hámmerfeasta, there are also two other common variants of the Sámi name: Hámmarfeasta and Hámmárfeasta.

=== Coat of arms ===
The coat of arms was granted on 16 December 1938, in preparation for the celebration of the 150th anniversary of the town's establishment in 1939. The official blazon is "Gules, a polar bear statant argent" (Norwegian: En hvit isbjørn i rødt). This means the arms have a red field (background) and the charge is a polar bear. The polar bear has a tincture of argent which means it is commonly colored white, but if it is made out of metal, then silver is used. The polar bear was chosen as a symbol for the fishing in the polar seas north of Norway. The polar bear itself is not native to mainland Norway. Because of its town status, the arms often have a mural crown above them. The arms were designed by Ole Valle and the design was updated by Arvid Steen in 2001.

=== Churches ===
The Church of Norway has three parishes (sokn) within Hammerfest Municipality. It is part of the Hammerfest prosti (deanery) in the Diocese of Nord-Hålogaland.

Churches in Hammerfest Municipality
Parish (sokn)	Church name	Location of the church	Year built
Hammerfest	Hammerfest Church	Hammerfest	1961
Kvalsund	Kvalsund Church	Kvalsund	1936
Kvalsund	Sennalandet Chapel	Áisaroaivi	1961
Kokelv	Kokelv Church	Kokelv	1960

== History ==
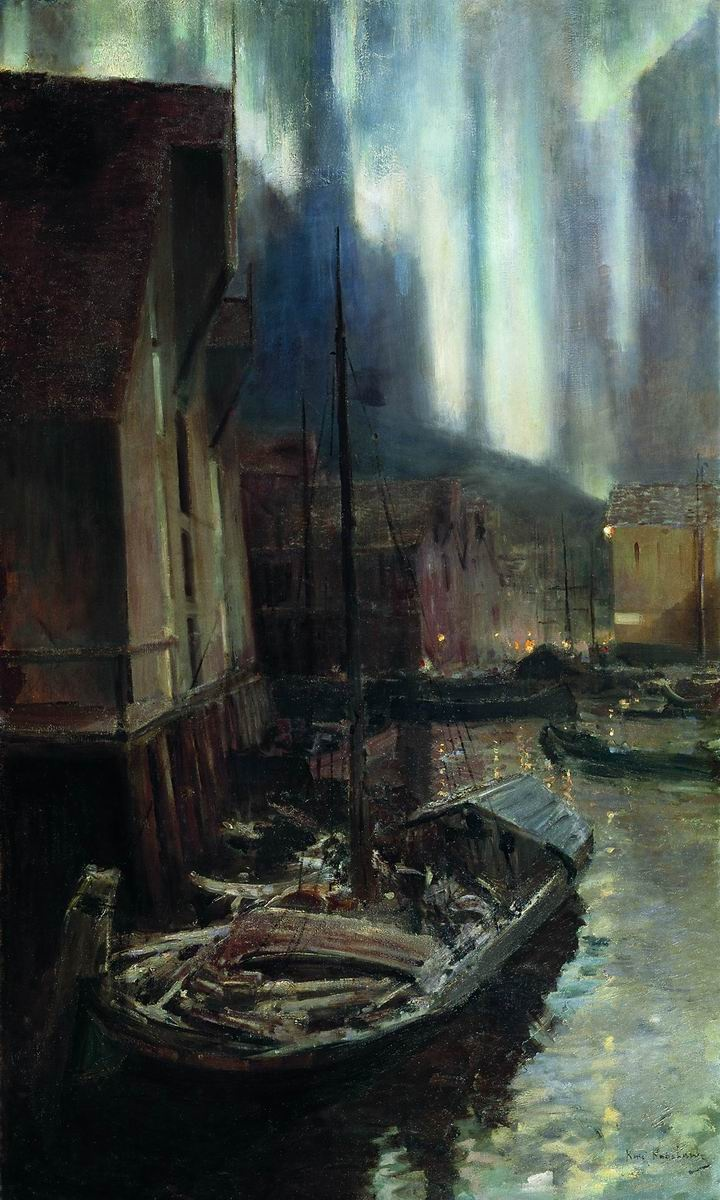
Painting by Konstantin Korovin, inspired by the Aurora Borealis in Hammerfest

Many grave sites dating back to the Stone Age can be found here. This location was an important fishing and Arctic hunting settlement for a long time before Hammerfest was given market town rights by royal decree of Christian VII of Denmark–Norway in 1789.

=== Destruction in World War II ===
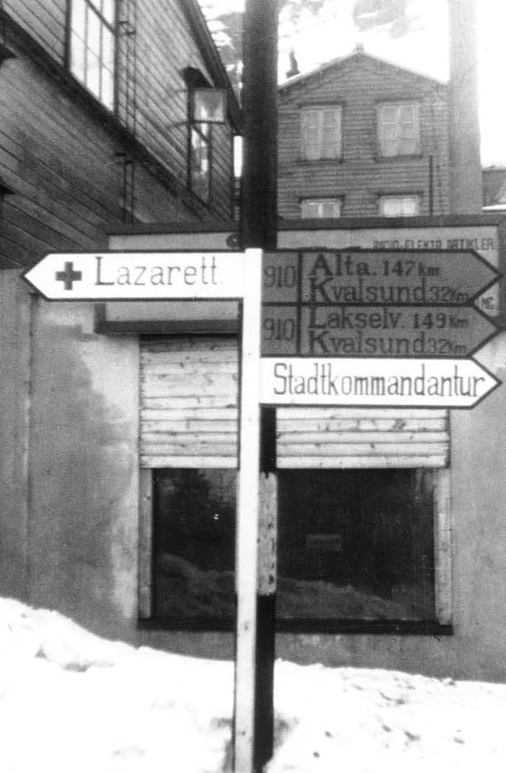
German sign in Hammerfest in 1941.

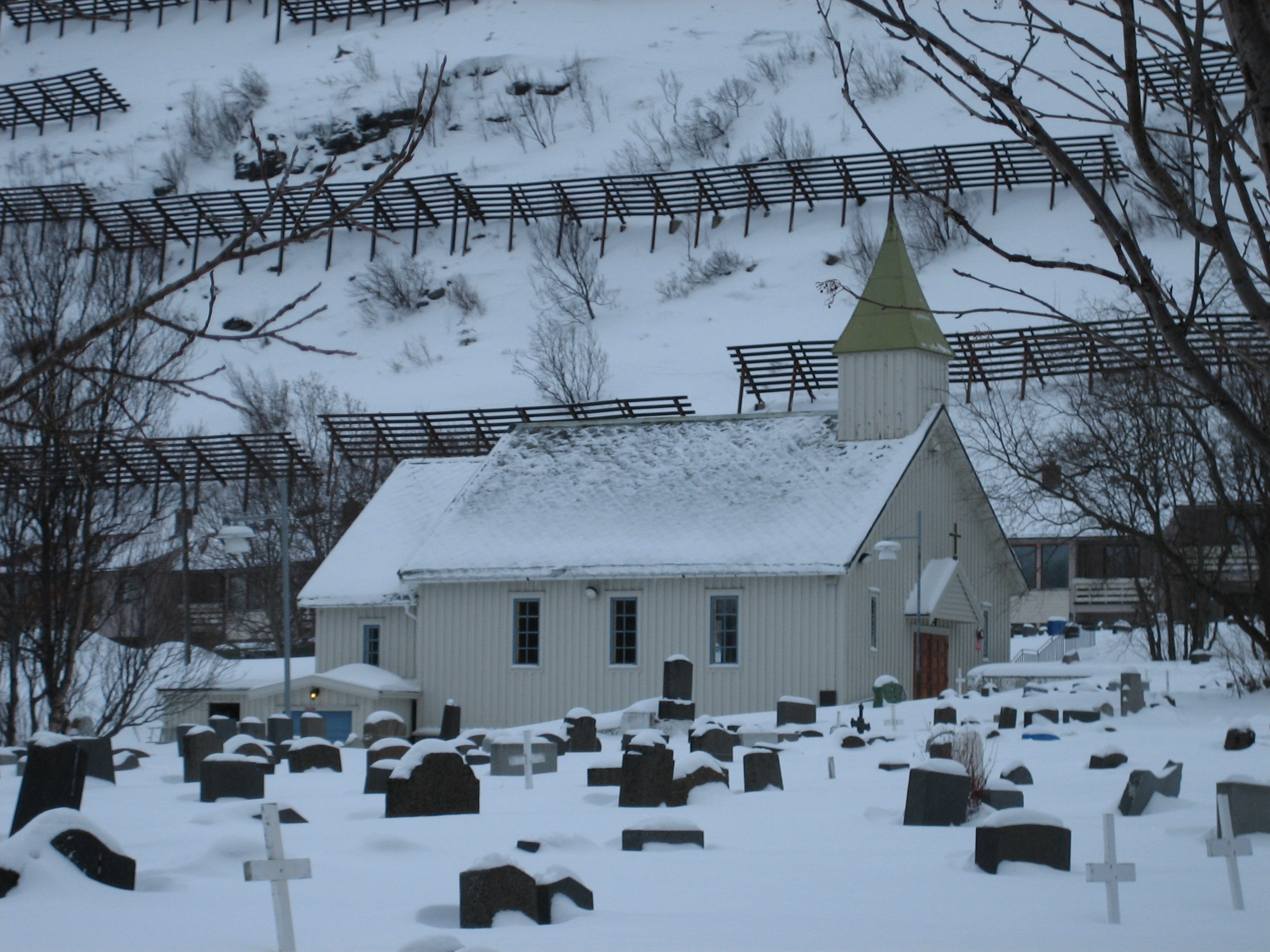
Hauen Chapel, the only building in Hammerfest left standing after the Second World War.

After their victory in the Norwegian Campaign of the Second World War, the Germans soon fortified the town of Hammerfest and used it as a major base. The importance of Hammerfest to the Germans increased dramatically after their invasion of the Soviet Union in 1941. The occupiers installed three coastal batteries in and around Hammerfest, one with four 10.5 cm (4.1 in) guns on Melkøya island near the town, one with three 10.5 cm guns on a hill right outside the town and a final battery with casemated 13 cm (5.1 in) pieces on the Rypklubben peninsula near Rypefjord.

The main German U-boat base in Finnmark was in Hammerfest, serving as a central supply base for the vessels attacking the allied supply convoys to Russia. Luftwaffe seaplanes were based at an improvised naval air station in nearby Rypefjord. The garrison in Hammerfest was also protected by around 4,000 mines and numerous anti-aircraft guns.

During their long retreat following the Petsamo-Kirkenes Operation, the Germans no longer managed to transport troops by sea further east due to intensive Red Air Force raids. Thus Hammerfest became their main shipping port in Finnmark in the autumn of 1944.

The town of Hammerfest was bombed twice by the Soviet Air Forces. The first time, on 14 February 1944, the town was hit by explosive and incendiary devices, but little damage was done. On 29 August 1944 Soviet bombers launched a second airstrike, inflicting significantly more damage to buildings and infrastructure in downtown Hammerfest. Two ships were sunk in the harbour. The ships lost were the local transports Tanahorn and Brynilen.

The population was forcibly evacuated by the occupying German troops in the autumn of 1944 after a Soviet offensive at the northern extremity of the Eastern Front pushed into eastern Finnmark. All of Finnmark including the town was looted and burned to the ground by the Germans when they retreated in 1945, the last of the town having been destroyed by the time the Germans finally left on 10 February 1945. Only the town's small funeral chapel, built in 1937, was left standing. The Museum of Reconstruction in Hammerfest tells the story of these events and the recovery of the region. The Soviet troops in eastern Finnmark were withdrawn in September 1945.

Mines and munitions left over from the Second World War were found and destroyed as late as 2008.

== Geography ==
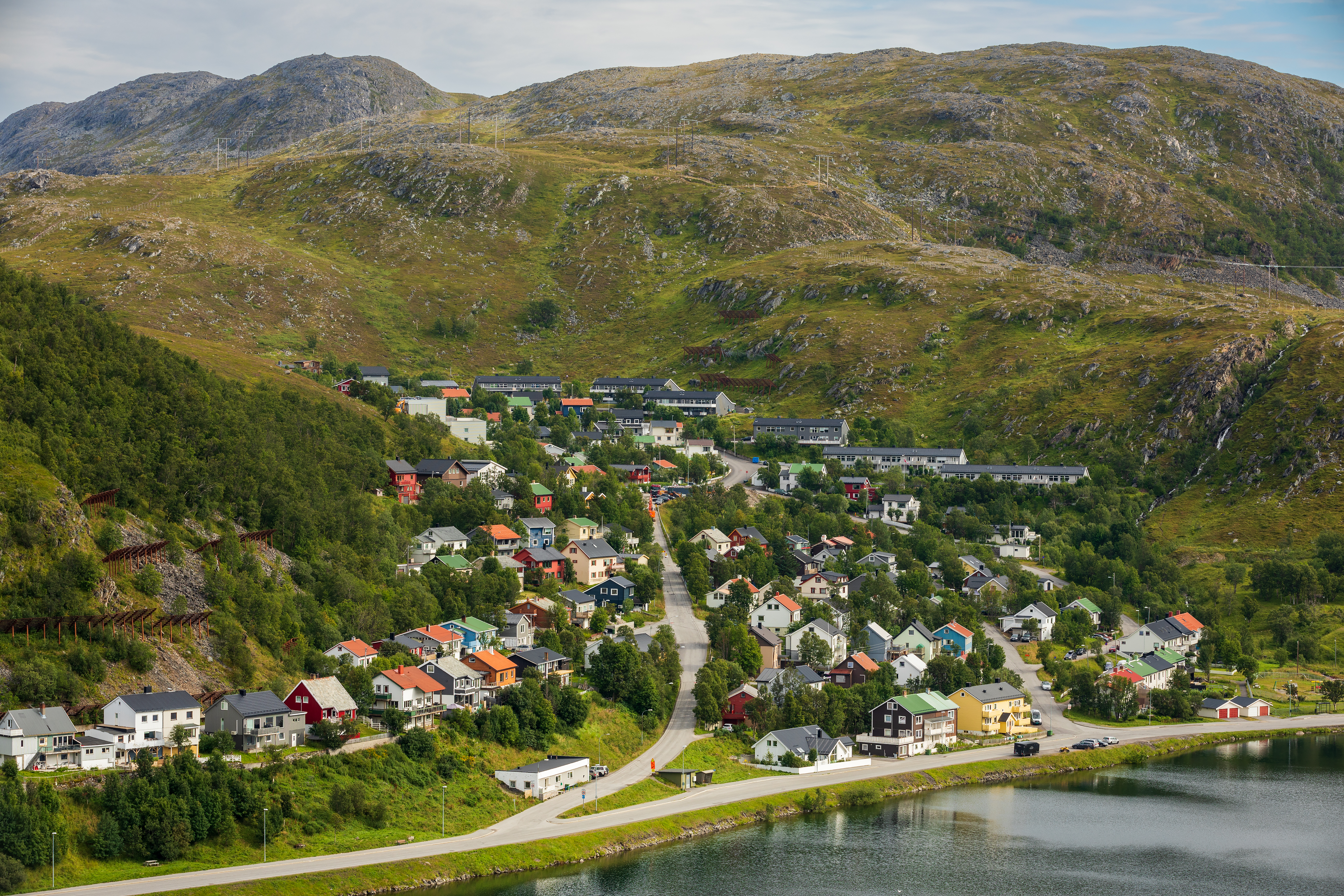
The town is partly located near Storvannet lake

The island municipality encompasses parts of the mainland as well as three large islands: Kvaløya, Sørøya, and Seiland. Other small islands such as Lille Kamøya and Kamøya are also located here. The Sørøysundet, Kvalfjorden, and Repparfjorden are all located in the municipality. The Vargsundet strait separates the island Seiland from the mainland. Seiland National Park is partially located in the municipality on the island of Seiland. Seilandsjøkelen and Nordmannsjøkelen are both large glaciers that are located in the park. The Nordefjorden is a fjord that is part of the park. The highest point in the municipality is the 1,078-metre (3,537 ft) tall mountain Seilandstuva. Komagaksla and Hammaren are both mountains located in Hammerfest Municipality.

Hasvik Municipality lies to the west, Alta Municipality lies to the southwest, Porsanger Municipality lies to the southeast, and Måsøy Municipality lies to the northeast. The Barents Sea lies to the north.

=== Climate ===
Hammerfest has an ocean-moderated subarctic climate (Köppen climate classification Dfc, Trewartha Eolo). In spite of the extreme northern location, there is no permafrost, as the mean annual temperature is approximately 2.5 °C (36 °F), about the same as Anchorage, Alaska, which is located at a latitude of 61° North. Hammerfest often experiences heavy snowfall in winter, and on some occasions, avalanches or risk of avalanches have forced some inhabitants to be evacuated from their exposed homes until the danger was over.

The "midnight sun" is above the horizon from 14 May to 31 July (79 days), and the period with continuous daylight lasts a bit longer, conversely the polar night lasts from 23 November to 19 January (59 days). The weather data is from Hammerfest Airport about 80 m elevation and 2 km from the town. Hammerfest town is at sea level, thus the town itself might be slightly warmer.

Climate data for Hammerfest, 1991–2020 normals, extremes 1957–present (Note: Regarding the temperature data of Hammerfest, the data from 1957 to 1987 was recorded at Hammerfest Radio, and the temperature data from 2002 to the present was recorded at Hammerfest Airport.)
Month	Jan	Feb	Mar	Apr	May	Jun	Jul	Aug	Sep	Oct	Nov	Dec	Year
Record high °C (°F)	8.0 (46.4)	9.3 (48.7)	9.8 (49.6)	12.3 (54.1)	23.9 (75.0)	28.9 (84.0)	29.7 (85.5)	29.3 (84.7)	21.6 (70.9)	18.9 (66.0)	11.8 (53.2)	9.9 (49.8)	29.7 (85.5)
Mean maximum °C (°F)	4.8 (40.6)	4.7 (40.5)	5.1 (41.2)	8.2 (46.8)	15.1 (59.2)	20.3 (68.5)	24.4 (75.9)	22.2 (72.0)	17.1 (62.8)	11.9 (53.4)	7.6 (45.7)	6.2 (43.2)	24.8 (76.6)
Mean daily maximum °C (°F)	−1.3 (29.7)	−1.6 (29.1)	−0.2 (31.6)	3.0 (37.4)	7.3 (45.1)	10.7 (51.3)	15.3 (59.5)	13.9 (57.0)	10.4 (50.7)	5.3 (41.5)	2.4 (36.3)	0.6 (33.1)	5.5 (41.9)
Daily mean °C (°F)	−3.5 (25.7)	−4.0 (24.8)	−2.5 (27.5)	0.1 (32.2)	4.0 (39.2)	7.6 (45.7)	11.3 (52.3)	10.6 (51.1)	7.9 (46.2)	2.9 (37.2)	−0.4 (31.3)	−1.8 (28.8)	2.7 (36.9)
Mean daily minimum °C (°F)	−6.7 (19.9)	−6.9 (19.6)	−5.2 (22.6)	−2.0 (28.4)	1.9 (35.4)	5.2 (41.4)	8.9 (48.0)	8.3 (46.9)	5.7 (42.3)	1.1 (34.0)	−2.4 (27.7)	−4.5 (23.9)	0.3 (32.5)
Mean minimum °C (°F)	−14.1 (6.6)	−13.9 (7.0)	−11.6 (11.1)	−8.4 (16.9)	−3.4 (25.9)	1.1 (34.0)	5.2 (41.4)	4.3 (39.7)	1.3 (34.3)	−5.2 (22.6)	−8.9 (16.0)	−11.0 (12.2)	−16.2 (2.8)
Record low °C (°F)	−23.5 (−10.3)	−23.0 (−9.4)	−21.0 (−5.8)	−16.5 (2.3)	−14.3 (6.3)	−4.3 (24.3)	2.5 (36.5)	0.0 (32.0)	−8.2 (17.2)	−15.0 (5.0)	−18.1 (−0.6)	−20.4 (−4.7)	−23.5 (−10.3)
Average precipitation mm (inches)	71 (2.8)	65 (2.6)	62 (2.4)	60 (2.4)	47 (1.9)	52 (2.0)	56 (2.2)	60 (2.4)	79 (3.1)	93 (3.7)	85 (3.3)	90 (3.5)	820 (32.3)
Average extreme snow depth cm (inches)	74 (29)	92 (36)	105 (41)	103 (41)	70 (28)	9 (3.5)	0 (0)	0 (0)	1 (0.4)	13 (5.1)	28 (11)	54 (21)	126 (50)
Average precipitation days (≥ 1.0 mm)	15	13	13	12	10	12	11	12	15	16	15	16	160
Average relative humidity (%)	76	76	76	75	74	76	77	80	79	80	79	77	77
Average dew point °C (°F)	−7.7 (18.1)	−7.9 (17.8)	−6.2 (20.8)	−3.3 (26.1)	0.2 (32.4)	3.8 (38.8)	7.6 (45.7)	7.1 (44.8)	5.1 (41.2)	0.2 (32.4)	−3.1 (26.4)	−4.9 (23.2)	−0.8 (30.6)
Source 1: Norwegian Meteorological Institute (Note: Extreme snow depth, precipitation and precipitation days 1961-90, dew point and humidity 1991-2020)
Source 2: NOAA WMO averages 1991–2020 Norway Notes

=== Reindeer problems ===
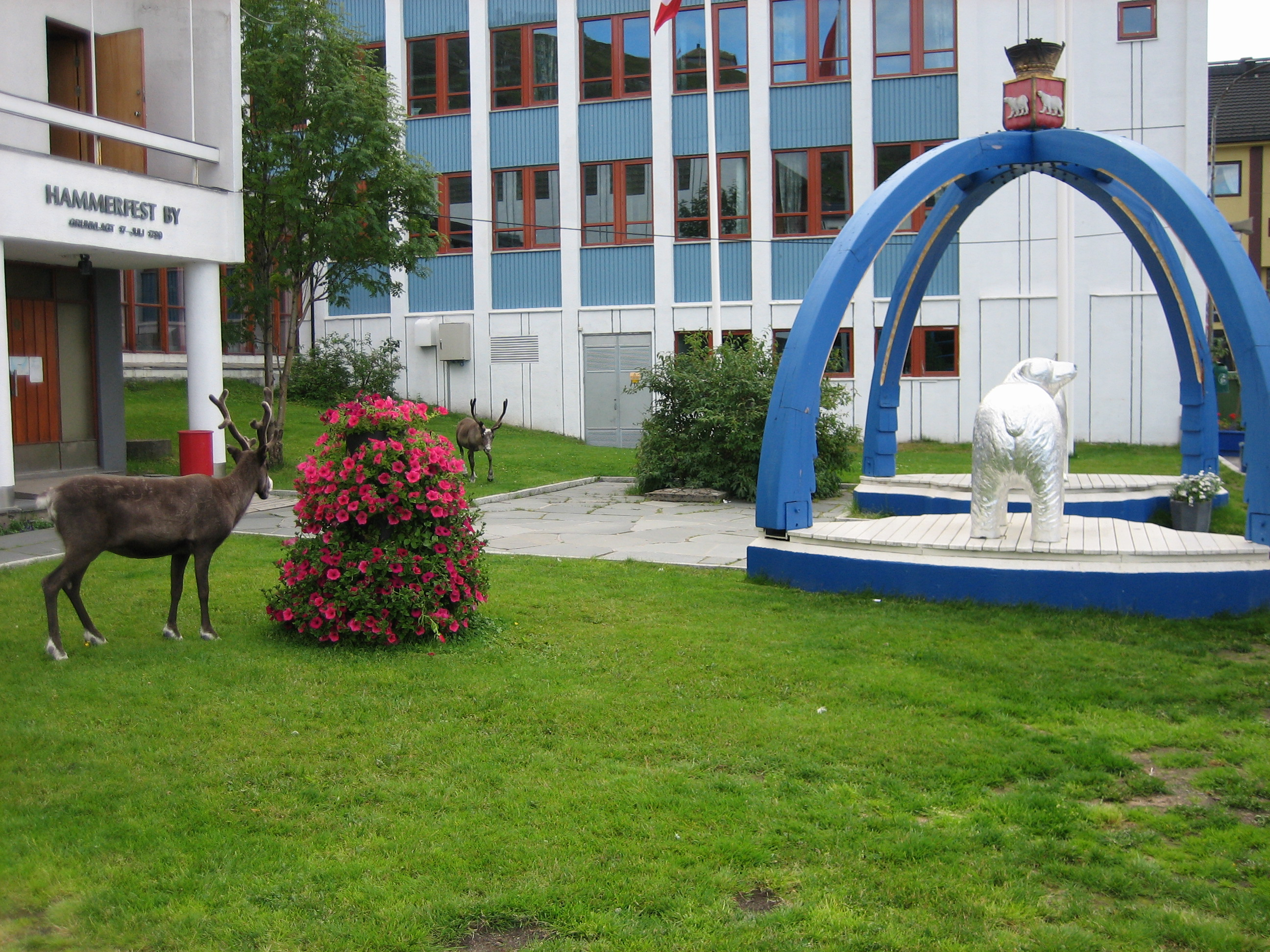
Reindeer grazing outside Hammerfest's town hall.

During the summer, massive reindeer herds migrate from their winter pastures in the inner parts of Finnmark to the coast. Among the islands inhabited by reindeer during the summer months is Kvaløya, the island on which Hammerfest town is located. For years many of the 2,500 to 3,000 reindeer in the area have been coming into the town itself, wandering in the streets and among the houses. Although popular with tourists, this has been less favourably received by the town's population, with people complaining of traffic disturbances and the dung and urine left by the animals. For hygienic reasons large sums of money have to be spent every year to clean up after the animals. In response to the complaints the town authorities built a 20-kilometre-long (12 mi), 1.2-metre-tall (4 ft) fence encircling the town to keep the animals out. However, as of the 2008 reindeer season, the fence had proven ineffective, with reindeer managing to pass through on road crossings, despite the presence of electrified grates embedded in the ground. The problem continues – the mayor, Alf E. Jakobsen, joked during the local election in 2011 that he was contemplating a career as a reindeer herder if he lost the vote.

== Government ==
Hammerfest Municipality is responsible for primary education (through 10th grade), outpatient health services, senior citizen services, welfare and other social services, zoning, economic development, and municipal roads and utilities. The municipality is governed by a municipal council of directly elected representatives. The mayor is indirectly elected by a vote of the municipal council. The municipality is under the jurisdiction of the Vestre Finnmark District Court and the Hålogaland Court of Appeal.

=== Municipal council ===
The municipal council (Kommunestyre) of Hammerfest Municipality is made up of 35 representatives that are elected to four year terms. The tables below show the current and historical composition of the council by political party.

Hammerfest kommunestyre 2023–2027
Party name (in Norwegian)	Number of representatives
Labour Party (Arbeiderpartiet)	7
Progress Party (Fremskrittspartiet)	3
Green Party (Miljøpartiet De Grønne)	1
Conservative Party (Høyre)	6
Christian Democratic Party (Kristelig Folkeparti)	1
Red Party (Rødt)	2
Centre Party (Senterpartiet)	1
Socialist Left Party (Sosialistisk Venstreparti)	3
Northern Party (Partiet Nord)	5
Total number of members:	35

Hammerfest kommunestyre 2019–2023
Party name (in Norwegian)	Number of representatives
Labour Party (Arbeiderpartiet)	18
Progress Party (Fremskrittspartiet)	2
Green Party (Miljøpartiet De Grønne)	1
Conservative Party (Høyre)	2
Christian Democratic Party (Kristelig Folkeparti)	3
Red Party (Rødt)	2
Centre Party (Senterpartiet)	3
Socialist Left Party (Sosialistisk Venstreparti)	4
Total number of members:	35
Note: On 1 January 2020, Kvalsund Municipality became part of Hammerfest Municipality.

Hammerfest kommunestyre 2015–2019
Party name (in Norwegian)	Number of representatives
Labour Party (Arbeiderpartiet)	20
Progress Party (Fremskrittspartiet)	1
Green Party (Miljøpartiet De Grønne)	1
Conservative Party (Høyre)	3
Christian Democratic Party (Kristelig Folkeparti)	1
Socialist Left Party (Sosialistisk Venstreparti)	3
Total number of members:	29

Hammerfest kommunestyre 2011–2015
Party name (in Norwegian)	Number of representatives
Labour Party (Arbeiderpartiet)	19
Progress Party (Fremskrittspartiet)	2
Conservative Party (Høyre)	5
Coastal Party (Kystpartiet)	1
Socialist Left Party (Sosialistisk Venstreparti)	2
Total number of members:	29

Hammerfest kommunestyre 2007–2011
Party name (in Norwegian)	Number of representatives
Labour Party (Arbeiderpartiet)	15
Progress Party (Fremskrittspartiet)	3
Conservative Party (Høyre)	5
Christian Democratic Party (Kristelig Folkeparti)	1
Coastal Party (Kystpartiet)	1
Red Electoral Alliance (Rød Valgallianse)	1
Socialist Left Party (Sosialistisk Venstreparti)	3
Total number of members:	29

Hammerfest kommunestyre 2003–2007
Party name (in Norwegian)	Number of representatives
Labour Party (Arbeiderpartiet)	20
Progress Party (Fremskrittspartiet)	2
Conservative Party (Høyre)	3
Red Electoral Alliance (Rød Valgallianse)	2
Socialist Left Party (Sosialistisk Venstreparti)	2
Total number of members:	29

Hammerfest kommunestyre 1999–2003
Party name (in Norwegian)	Number of representatives
Labour Party (Arbeiderpartiet)	15
Progress Party (Fremskrittspartiet)	2
Conservative Party (Høyre)	9
Red Electoral Alliance (Rød Valgallianse)	1
Socialist Left Party (Sosialistisk Venstreparti)	2
Total number of members:	29

Hammerfest kommunestyre 1995–1999
Party name (in Norwegian)	Number of representatives
Labour Party (Arbeiderpartiet)	11
Progress Party (Fremskrittspartiet)	1
Conservative Party (Høyre)	12
Red Electoral Alliance (Rød Valgallianse)	2
Centre Party (Senterpartiet)	1
Socialist Left Party (Sosialistisk Venstreparti)	2
Total number of members:	29

Hammerfest kommunestyre 1991–1995
Party name (in Norwegian)	Number of representatives
Labour Party (Arbeiderpartiet)	22
Conservative Party (Høyre)	9
Christian Democratic Party (Kristelig Folkeparti)	1
Red Electoral Alliance (Rød Valgallianse)	1
Socialist Left Party (Sosialistisk Venstreparti)	9
Joint list of the Centre Party (Senterpartiet) and the Liberal Party (Venstre)	3
Total number of members:	45

Hammerfest bystyre 1987–1991
Party name (in Norwegian)	Number of representatives
Labour Party (Arbeiderpartiet)	17
Conservative Party (Høyre)	6
Communist Party (Kommunistiske Parti)	1
Christian Democratic Party (Kristelig Folkeparti)	1
Red Electoral Alliance (Rød Valgallianse)	1
Socialist Left Party (Sosialistisk Venstreparti)	3
Total number of members:	29

Hammerfest bystyre 1983–1987
Party name (in Norwegian)	Number of representatives
Labour Party (Arbeiderpartiet)	20
Conservative Party (Høyre)	5
Communist Party (Kommunistiske Parti)	1
Christian Democratic Party (Kristelig Folkeparti)	1
Socialist Left Party (Sosialistisk Venstreparti)	2
Total number of members:	29

Hammerfest bystyre 1979–1983
Party name (in Norwegian)	Number of representatives
Labour Party (Arbeiderpartiet)	16
Conservative Party (Høyre)	8
Communist Party (Kommunistiske Parti)	1
Christian Democratic Party (Kristelig Folkeparti)	1
Red Electoral Alliance (Rød Valgallianse)	1
Socialist Left Party (Sosialistisk Venstreparti)	2
Total number of members:	29

Hammerfest bystyre 1975–1979
Party name (in Norwegian)	Number of representatives
Labour Party (Arbeiderpartiet)	16
Conservative Party (Høyre)	6
Christian Democratic Party (Kristelig Folkeparti)	2
New People's Party (Nye Folkepartiet)	1
Socialist Left Party (Sosialistisk Venstreparti)	4
Total number of members:	29

Hammerfest bystyre 1971–1975
Party name (in Norwegian)	Number of representatives
Labour Party (Arbeiderpartiet)	19
Conservative Party (Høyre)	5
Christian Democratic Party (Kristelig Folkeparti)	1
Liberal Party (Venstre)	1
Socialist common list (Venstresosialistiske felleslister)	3
Total number of members:	29

Hammerfest bystyre 1967–1971
Party name (in Norwegian)	Number of representatives
Labour Party (Arbeiderpartiet)	18
Conservative Party (Høyre)	6
Communist Party (Kommunistiske Parti)	1
Socialist People's Party (Sosialistisk Folkeparti)	2
Liberal Party (Venstre)	2
Total number of members:	29

Hammerfest bystyre 1963–1967
Party name (in Norwegian)	Number of representatives
Labour Party (Arbeiderpartiet)	18
Conservative Party (Høyre)	7
Communist Party (Kommunistiske Parti)	2
Liberal Party (Venstre)	2
Total number of members:	29

Hammerfest bystyre 1959–1963
Party name (in Norwegian)	Number of representatives
Labour Party (Arbeiderpartiet)	18
Conservative Party (Høyre)	6
Communist Party (Kommunistiske Parti)	3
Liberal Party (Venstre)	2
Total number of members:	29

Hammerfest bystyre 1955–1959
Party name (in Norwegian)	Number of representatives
Labour Party (Arbeiderpartiet)	18
Conservative Party (Høyre)	5
Communist Party (Kommunistiske Parti)	3
Christian Democratic Party (Kristelig Folkeparti)	1
Liberal Party (Venstre)	2
Total number of members:	29

Hammerfest bystyre 1951–1955
Party name (in Norwegian)	Number of representatives
Labour Party (Arbeiderpartiet)	15
Conservative Party (Høyre)	4
Communist Party (Kommunistiske Parti)	5
Liberal Party (Venstre)	4
Total number of members:	28

Hammerfest bystyre 1947–1951
Party name (in Norwegian)	Number of representatives
Labour Party (Arbeiderpartiet)	15
Conservative Party (Høyre)	4
Communist Party (Kommunistiske Parti)	6
Total number of members:	28

Hammerfest bystyre 1945–1947
Party name (in Norwegian)	Number of representatives
Labour Party (Arbeiderpartiet)	15
Communist Party (Kommunistiske Parti)	7
Joint List(s) of Non-Socialist Parties (Borgerlige Felleslister)	6
Total number of members:	28

Hammerfest bystyre 1937–1941*
Party name (in Norwegian)	Number of representatives
Labour Party (Arbeiderpartiet)	17
Conservative Party (Høyre)	6
Liberal Party (Venstre)	5
Total number of members:	28
Note: Due to the German occupation of Norway during World War II, no elections were held for new municipal councils until after the war ended in 1945.

Hammerfest bystyre 1934–1937
Party name (in Norwegian)	Number of representatives
Labour Party (Arbeiderpartiet)	18
Conservative Party (Høyre)	4
Liberal Party (Venstre)	6
Total number of members:	28

Hammerfest bystyre 1931–1934
Party name (in Norwegian)	Number of representatives
Labour Party (Arbeiderpartiet)	17
Liberal Party (Venstre)	7
Joint list of the Conservative Party (Høyre) and the Free-minded People's Party (Frisinnede Folkeparti)	4
Total number of members:	28

Hammerfest bystyre 1928–1931
Party name (in Norwegian)	Number of representatives
Labour Party (Arbeiderpartiet)	18
Joint List(s) of Non-Socialist Parties (Borgerlige Felleslister)	10
Total number of members:	28

Hammerfest bystyre 1925–1928
Party name (in Norwegian)	Number of representatives
Labour Party (Arbeiderpartiet)	16
Liberal Party (Venstre)	4
Joint list of the Conservative Party (Høyre) and the Free-minded Liberal Party (Frisinnede Venstre)	6
Local List(s) (Lokale lister)	2
Total number of members:	28

Hammerfest bystyre 1922–1925
Party name (in Norwegian)	Number of representatives
Labour Party (Arbeiderpartiet)	14
Liberal Party (Venstre)	3
Joint List(s) of Non-Socialist Parties (Borgerlige Felleslister)	8
Local List(s) (Lokale lister)	3
Total number of members:	28

=== Mayors ===
The mayor (Norwegian: ordfører) of Hammerfest Municipality is the political leader of the municipality and the chairperson of the municipal council. Here is a list of people who have held this position:

- 1839–1841: Hans Cato Aall
- 1841–1843: Henrik Øwre
- 1843–1845: Hans Cato Aall
- 1845–1846: Anton Magnus Søeberg
- 1846–1851: Iver Christian Rostad
- 1851–1854: Gerhard Wiesener
- 1855–1855: Iver Christian Rostad
- 1856–1856: Emanuel Dohren Peters
- 1857–1858: Gerhard Wiesener
- 1859–1860: Iver Christian Rostad
- 1861–1862: Ole Johan Finckenhagen
- 1863–1866: Elias Andreas Nilsen
- 1867–1867: Ole Lund
- 1868–1868: Jakob Sverdrup Smitt
- 1869–1870: Ole Lund
- 1871–1872: Jakob Sverdrup Smitt
- 1873–1876: Ole Lund
- 1877–1878: Carl Rein
- 1879–1887: Marius Ørbek Berg (H)
- 1887–1891: Ole Lund (H)
- 1892–1892: Christian Finckenhagen (H)
- 1893–1893: Peder Johansen (V)
- 1894–1894: Christian Finckenhagen (H)
- 1895–1901: Ole Kristian Simonsen (H)
- 1902–1902: Peder Johansen (V)
- 1903–1913: Hans Alfred Hansen (V)
- 1914–1917: Olaf Eriksen (Ap)
- 1918–1918: Svein O. Øraker (Ap)
- 1919–1920: Olaf Eriksen (Ap)
- 1921–1923: Sigurd M. Eriksen (Ap)
- 1924–1925: Charles Robertson (H)
- 1926–1931: Sigurd M. Eriksen (Ap)
- 1932–1934: Hans Sætrum (Ap)
- 1935–1935: Sigurd Marius Eriksen (Ap)
- 1936–1936: Leif S. Olsen (Ap)
- 1936–1941: Thoralf Albrigtsen (Ap)
- 1941–1944: Peder J. Berg (NS)
- 1945–1945: Thoralf Albrigtsen (Ap)
- 1946–1951: Harald J. Olsen (Ap)
- 1952–1961: Ørjan Østvik (Ap)
- 1962–1966: Anton Eide (Ap)
- 1966–1966: Ragnvald Jacobsen (Ap)
- 1967–1971: Aksel Olsen (Ap)
- 1972–1975: Arnulf Olsen (Ap)
- 1976–1983: Erling Jensen (Ap)
- 1984–1987: Arnulf Olsen (Ap)
- 1988–1995: Kåre Rønbeck (Ap)
- 1995–1999: Tormod Bartholdsen (H)
- 1999–2006: Alf E. Jakobsen (Ap)
- 2006–2009: Kristine Jørstad Bock (Ap)
- 2009–2019: Alf E. Jakobsen (Ap)
- 2019–2021: Marianne Sivertsen Næss (Ap)
- 2021–2023: Terje Wikstrøm (Ap)
- 2023–present: Terje Rogde (H)

== Economy and tourism ==
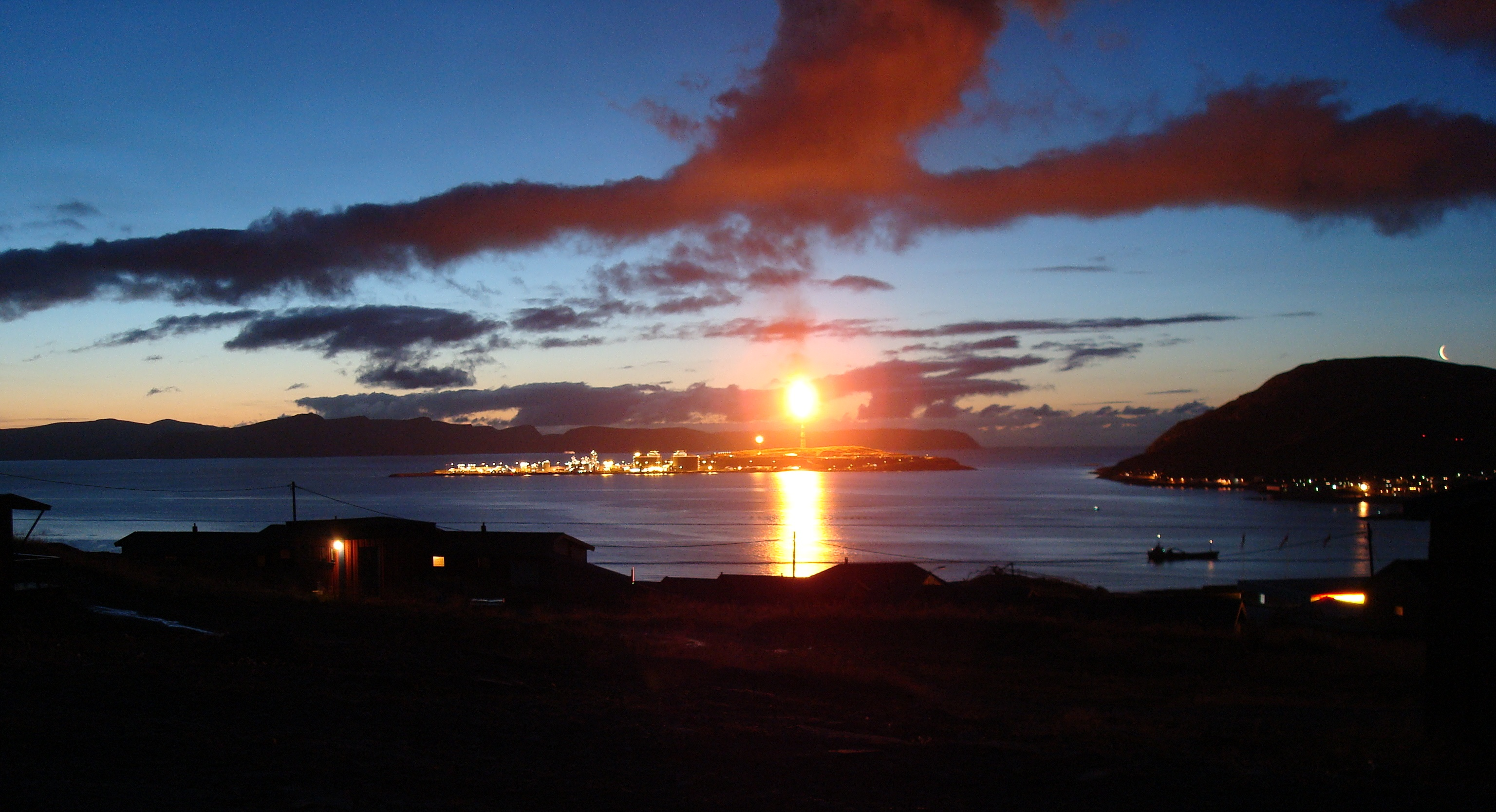
The LNG site on Melkøya at dusk seen from the Storsvingen Tourist center.

The construction of the large liquefied natural gas site on Melkøya (island) just off Hammerfest, which will process natural gas from Snøhvit, is the most expensive construction project in the history of Northern Norway. This project has resulted in an economic boom and new optimism in Hammerfest in recent years, a stark contrast to the economic downhill and negative population growth most other municipalities in Finnmark are experiencing. After the opening of natural gas production on Melkøya there have been some problems with significant smoke and soot pollution in the initial production phases. Snøhvit is Europe's first export facility for liquefied natural gas.

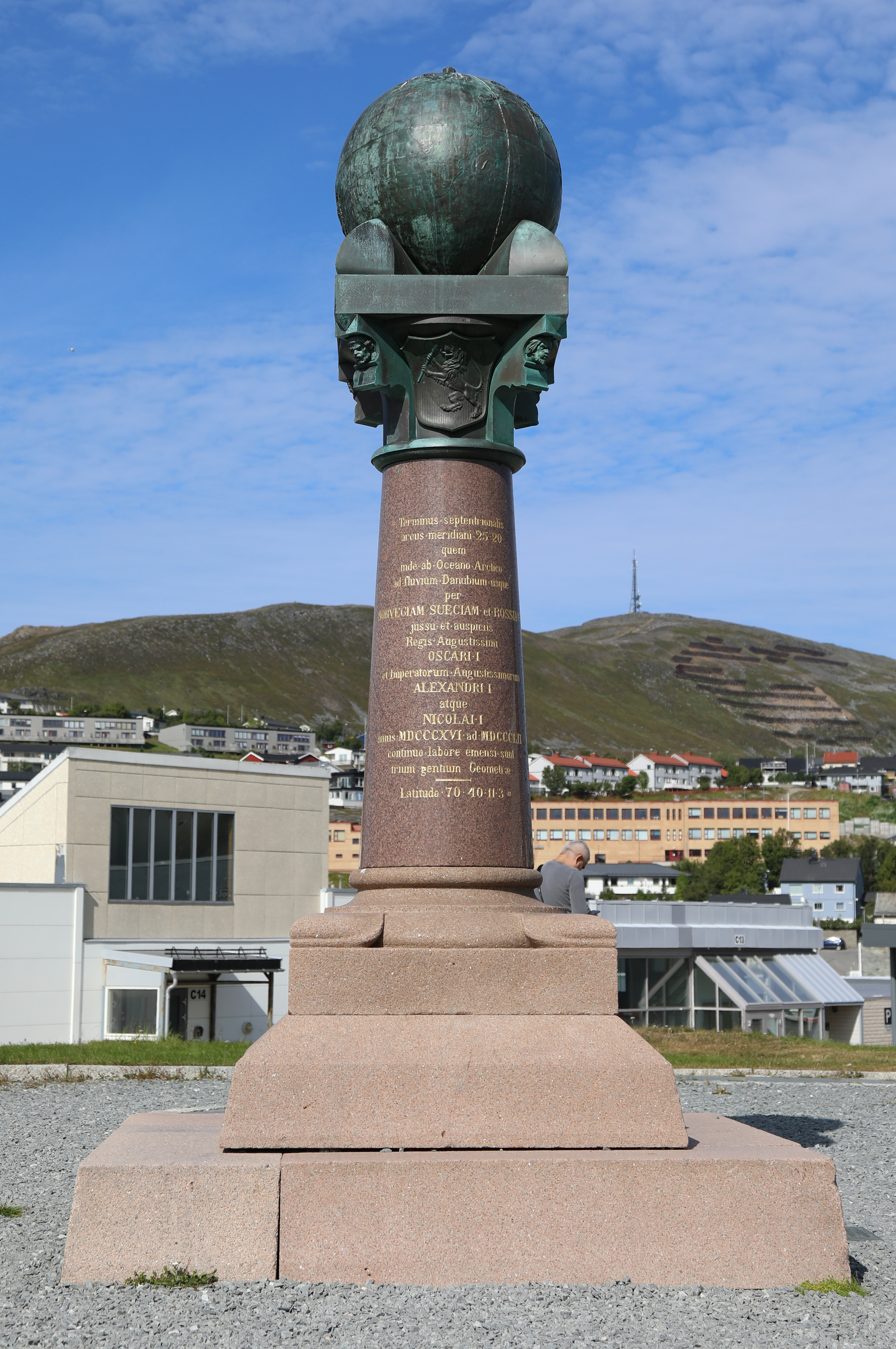
Station of the Struve Geodetic Arc in Hammerfest

Hammerfest offers sport and commercial fishing, both sea and freshwater, as well as scuba diving. The northernmost glacier on the Norwegian mainland is a hiking destination. The town is a starting point for northern tours. There is a daily boat to the North Cape (Norwegian: Nordkapp). One chain of the Struve Geodetic Arc, now on the World Heritage List, is located at Fuglenes in Hammerfest.

Hammerfest is also a centre of Sami culture. Hammerfest is home to the Royal and Ancient Polar Bear Society (Norwegian: Isbjørnklubben); a museum displaying the history of Arctic hunting.

The newspaper Hammerfestingen is published in Hammerfest.

The Nussir copper mine has not started operations (as of 2025); Protests (Q2 2025) in regard to construction, resulted in construction being temporarily stopped. In June 2025, the municipality ordered a pause in construction.

American author Bill Bryson begins his European travels in 1990, documented in his book Neither Here Nor There, with a visit to Hammerfest in order to see the Northern Lights, calling it "an agreeable enough town in a thank-you-God-for-not-making-me-live-here sort of way".

== Transportation ==
Hammerfest is connected to the main road network by Norwegian national road 94 which branches off from European route E6 at Skaidi in the neighbouring municipality of Kvalsund. The town is a port of call for the Hurtigruten ship route. Hammerfest also has Finnmark's third largest airport, Hammerfest Airport, opened 30 July 1974. Before the opening of the airport, the only air link to Hammerfest was by seaplane, the first route established in 1936.

== International relations ==
=== Twin towns – Sister cities ===
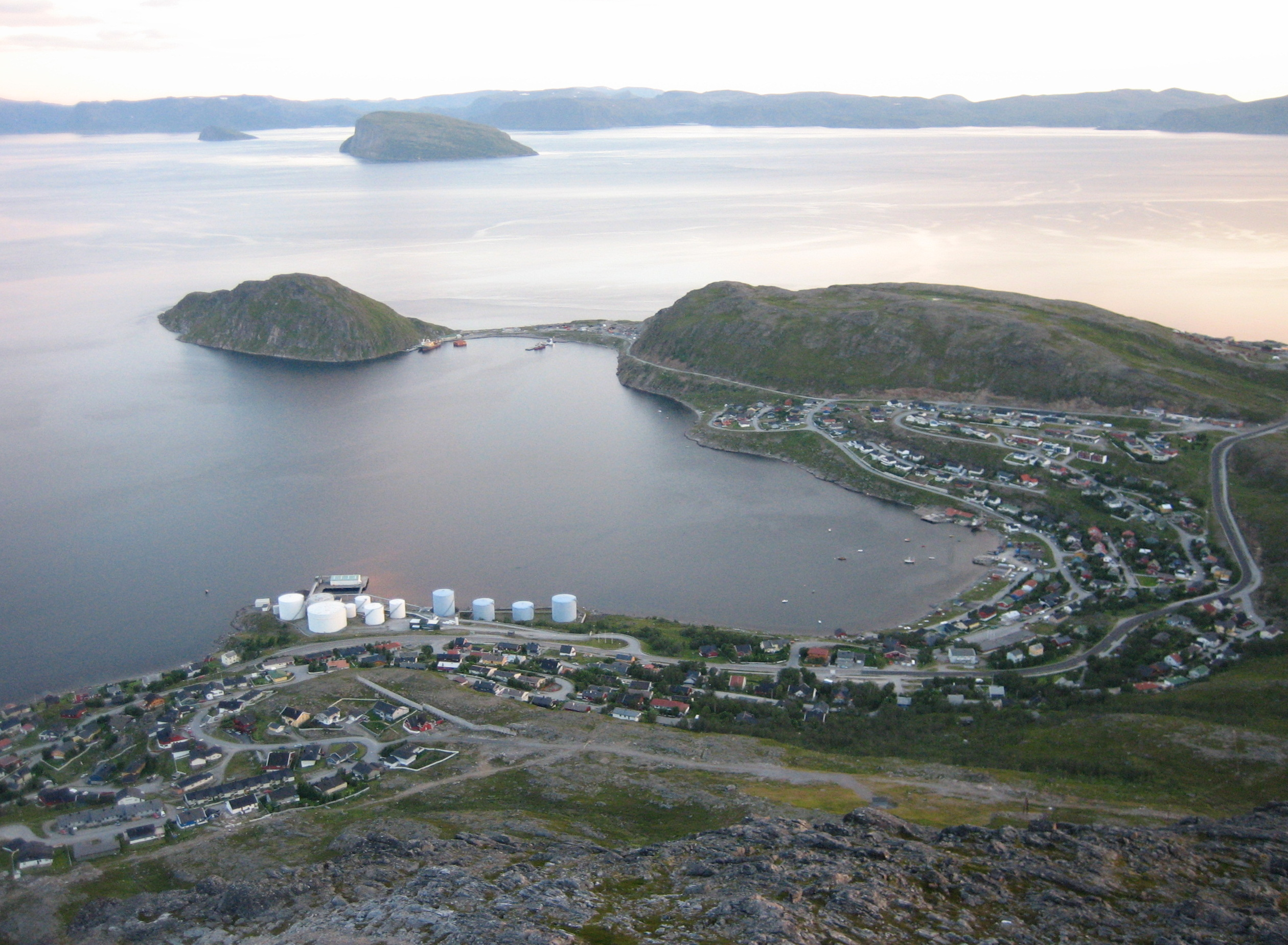
The Rypefjord suburb in Hammerfest

Hammerfest is town twinned with the following foreign settlements:

- – Haparanda, Sweden
- – Ikast, Denmark
- – Kola, Russia
- – Mokpo, South Korea
- – Petersburg, Alaska, United States
- – Tornio, Finland
- – Trelleborg, Sweden
- – Ushuaia, Argentina

=== Foreign consulates ===
Denmark, Sweden, Finland and the Netherlands have honorary consulates in Hammerfest.

== Notable people ==
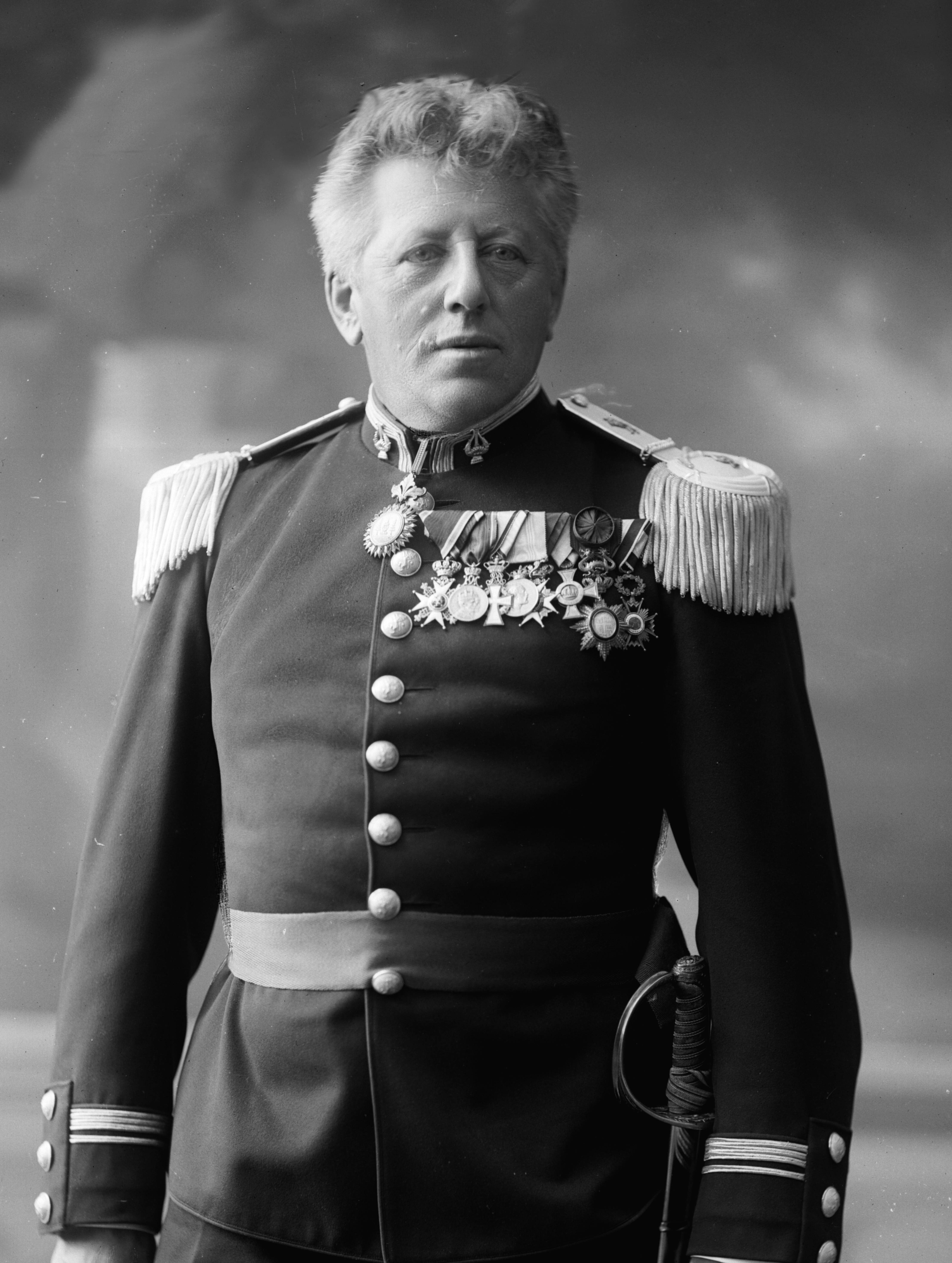
Ole Olsen, 1909

- Sir John Rice Crowe (1795–1877), an English businessman and diplomat, deputy vice-consul in Hammerfest and British consul in Finnmark who lived in Hammerfest
- Ole Olsen (1850–1927), an organist, composer, conductor, and military musician
- Adolf Lindstrøm (1866–1939), a chef and polar explorer
- Paal Berg (1873–1968), a politician who was the 12th Chief Justice of the Supreme Court from 1929 to 1946
- Charles Robertson (1875–1958), the Norwegian Minister of Trade from 1926 to 1928
- Jørgen Holmboe (1902–1979), a Norwegian-American meteorologist
- Per Møystad Backe (1914–1991), a jurist who developed Scandinavian Airlines
- Annemarie Lorentzen (1921–2008), a teacher, politician, and Norwegian ambassador to Iceland from 1978 to 1985
- Knut Moe (1921–1989), a Norwegian resistance member in WWII and radio agent for the SIS
- Kåre Berg (1932–2009), a professor in medical genetics who discovered the Lipoprotein(a)
- Sven Ullring (born 1935), an engineer and businessperson
- Turi Josefsen (born 1936), a Norwegian-American businesswoman
- Kåre Kivijärvi (1938–1991), a photographer who did photojournalistic work in Northern Norway
- Bjørn Sundquist (born 1948), an actor who is famous for TV, theatre, and movie roles
- Annelise Josefsen (born 1949), a Norwegian-Sami artist
- Bodil Niska (born 1954), a jazz musician on saxophone who grew up in Hammerfest
- Thomas Thormodsæter Haugen, known as Samoth, (born 1974), a black metal musician and multi-instrumentalist
- Gunnar Garfors (born 1975), a traveller, author, media professional, and public speaker
- Máret Ánne Sara (born 1983), a Sami artist and author who lives and works in Kautokeino Municipality
- Hvaldimir, a beluga whale known for mysterious Russian origins and frequent appearances in Hammerfest Harbour

=== Sport ===
- Fred Børre Lundberg (born 1969), a Nordic skier who won two team silver medals and one team gold medal at the Winter Olympics and an individual gold at the 1994 Winter Olympics
- Christine Bøe Jensen (born 1975), a former footballer and team gold medallist at the 2000 Summer Olympics
