= Royal and Ancient Polar Bear Society =

Tourist attraction in Hammerfest, Norway

Coordinates: 70°39′52.75″N 23°40′52.25″E

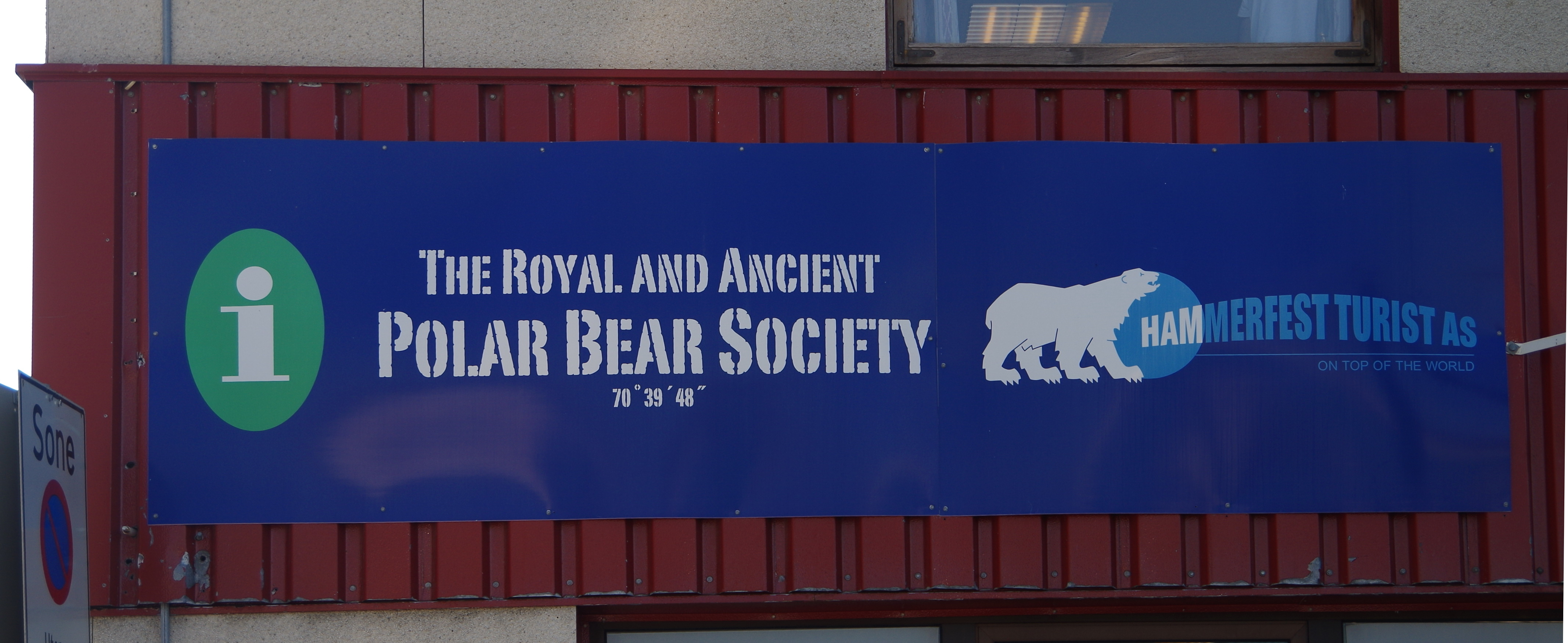
Royal and Ancient Polar Bear Society banner

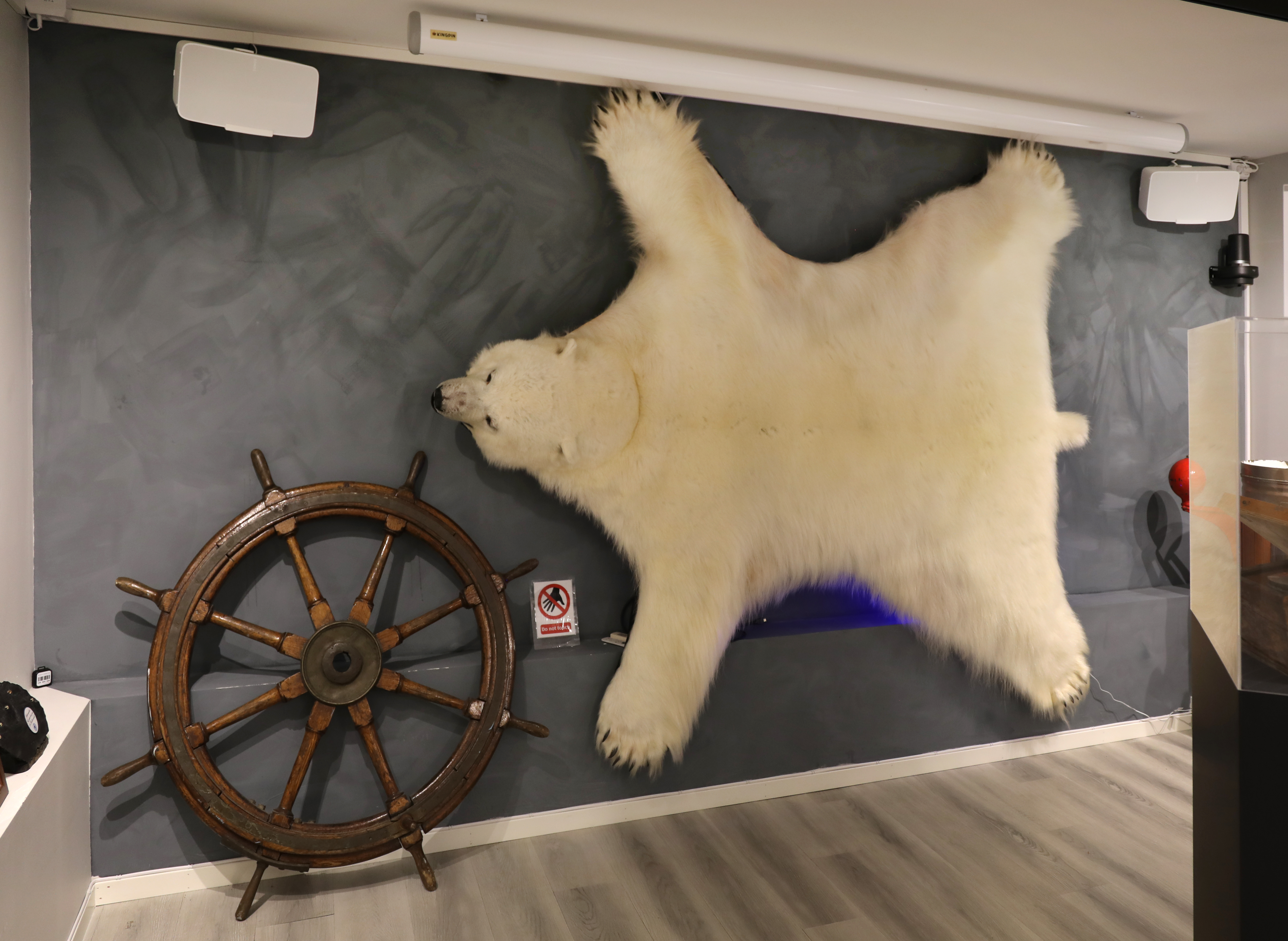
Interior of the museum in Hammerfast

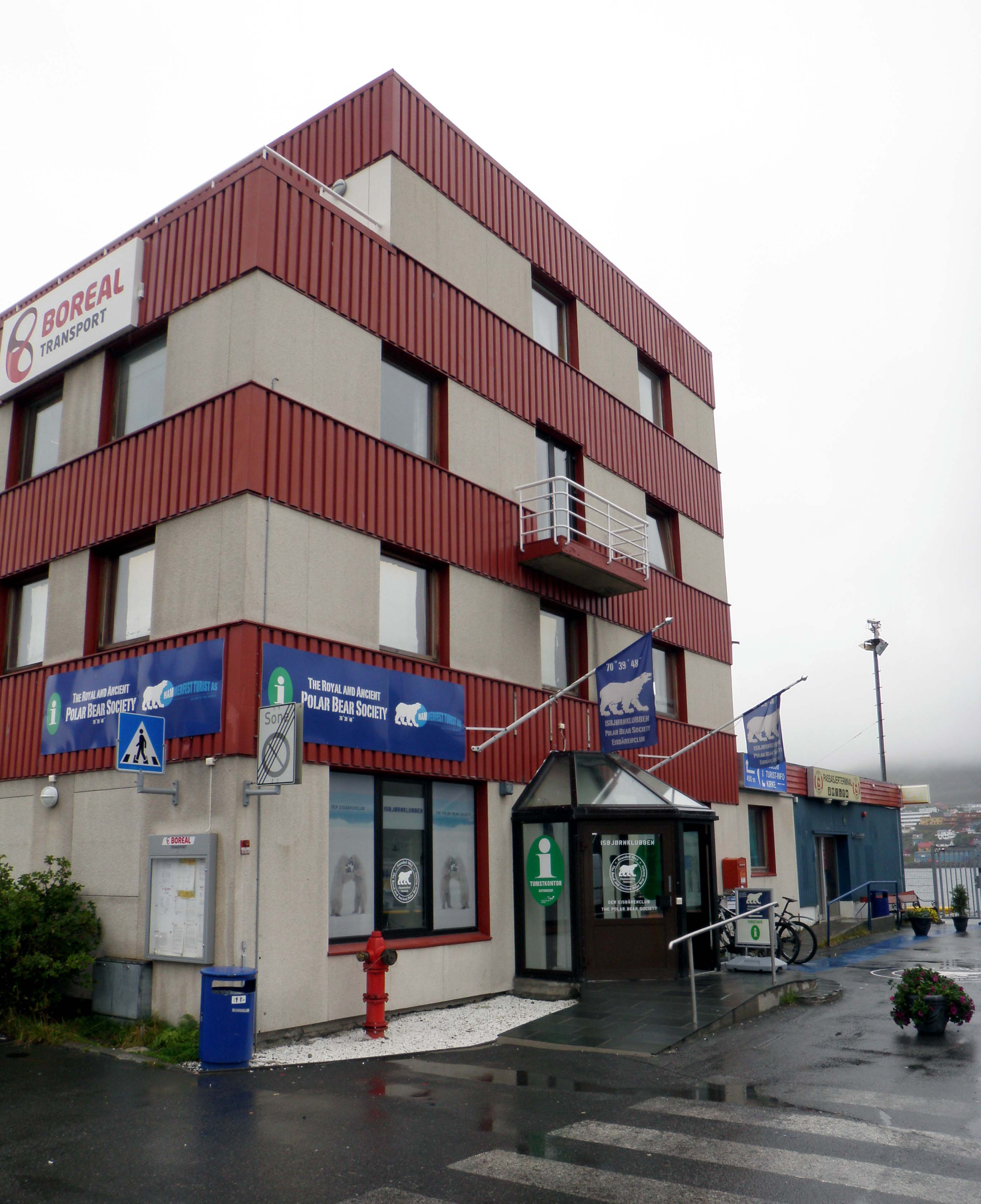
Present building of the Royal and Ancient Polar Bear Society

The Royal and Ancient Polar Bear Society or Polar Bear Club (Norwegian Isbjørnklubben, "Polar Bear Club") is an exhibition about local history and Arctic hunting in the town of Hammerfest in Finnmark, Norway. The significance of the polar bear is that this animal is the town's mascot and heraldic crest.

For all its remoteness, Hammerfest has a long history as a trading port, and Polar Bear Club sets out to commemorate this. In the museum's single room are a variety of mementos of the early life of Hammerfest, including a profusion of stuffed animals, early Arctic hunting, traveling and camping equipment, and a gallery of photographs, paintings, drawings and writings of and from the town's history. These depict the town as it was in previous centuries, showing that as far back as the seventeenth century, this tiny town was a nexus for travelers and traders in the far north and a meeting point for the isolated people of North Norway, traders sailing up from southern Europe and hunters and traders coming west from the Arctic Ocean and Russia.

Founded in 1963 by two local businessmen, the Polar Bear Club is not particularly ancient. Primarily, it is a somewhat jokey amenity for tourists. Although entrance to the actual exhibition is free of charge, visitors are encouraged to join the Society, which is rewarded with a membership pack, the contents of which include a certificate signed by the actual mayor, a sticker, a membership card and a lapel pin made of silver and enamel. Since the only way to join is in person at the Polar Bear Society, this pin provides proof of visiting this remote place. As of 2024 there were reported to be around 282000 members worldwide.
