= Rypefjord =

- Village
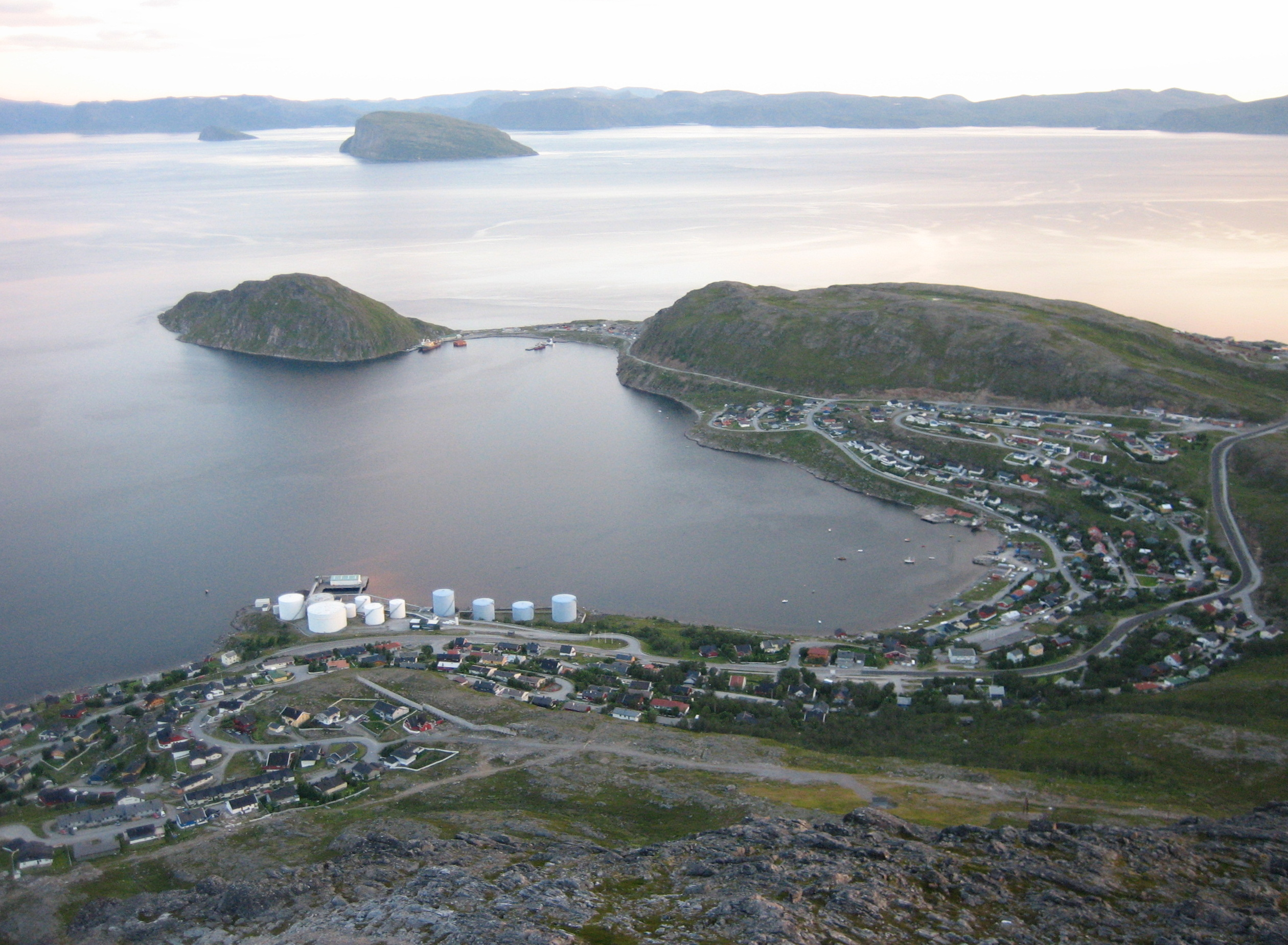
- View of the village
- Interactive map of Rypefjord
- Location within Finnmark Location within Norway
- Coordinates: 70°38′28″N 23°40′19″E
- Country: Norway
- Region: Northern Norway
- County: Finnmark
- District: Vest-Finnmark
- Municipality: Hammerfest Municipality

Area
  - Total: 1.43 km^{2} (0.55 sq mi)
- Elevation: 23 m (75 ft)

Population (2023)
  - Total: 1,802
  - Density: 1,260/km^{2} (3,300/sq mi)
- Time zone: UTC+01:00 (CET)
  - Summer (DST): UTC+02:00 (CEST)
- Post Code: 9610 Rypefjord

Rypefjord is a village in Hammerfest Municipality in Finnmark county, Norway. The village is located just south of the town of Hammerfest on the western side of the large island of Kvaløya. Rypefjord was the main population centre of the former municipality of Sørøysund, which existed from 1852 until its dissolution in 1992. Fjordtun primary school is located in Rypefjord.

Today, Rypefjord is considered a suburb of the town of Hammerfest. The 1.43-square-kilometre (350-acre) village has a population (2023) of 1,802 which gives the village a population density of 1,260 inhabitants per square kilometre (3,300/sq mi).

== Media gallery ==
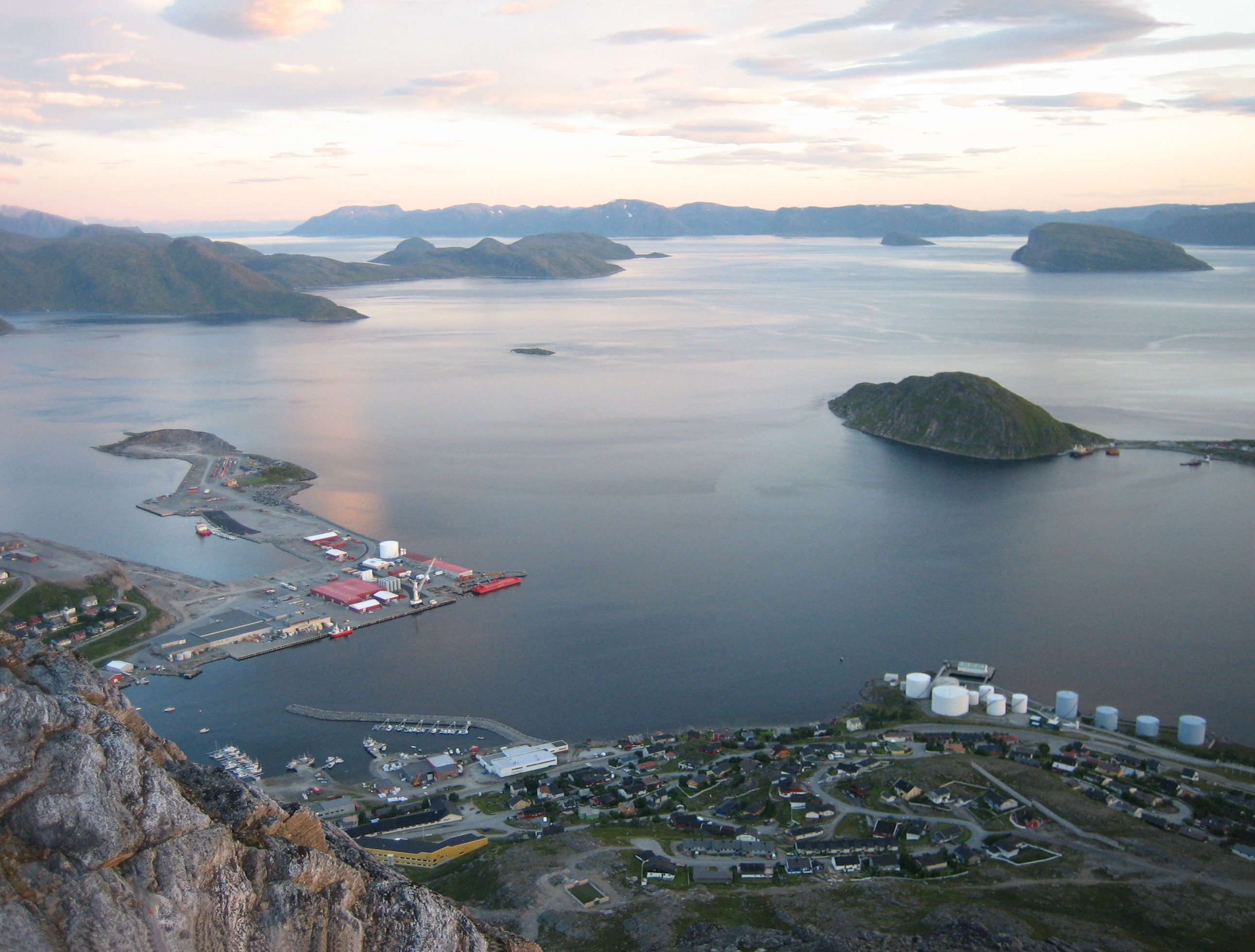
Rypefjord harbour at night

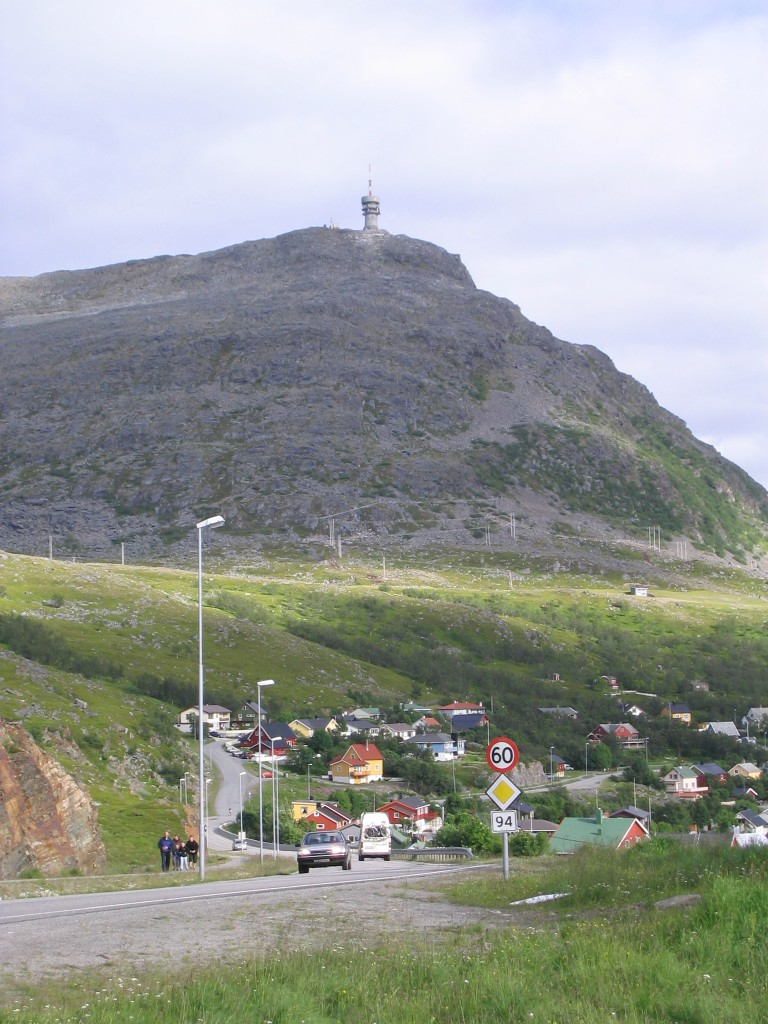
The mountain Tyven - overlooking Rypefjord

== See also ==
- List of villages in Finnmark
