= Akkarfjord (Sørøya) =

Village in Hammerfest, Norway

Akkarfjord (Norwegian); Áhkkárvuotna (Northern Sami)
- Village
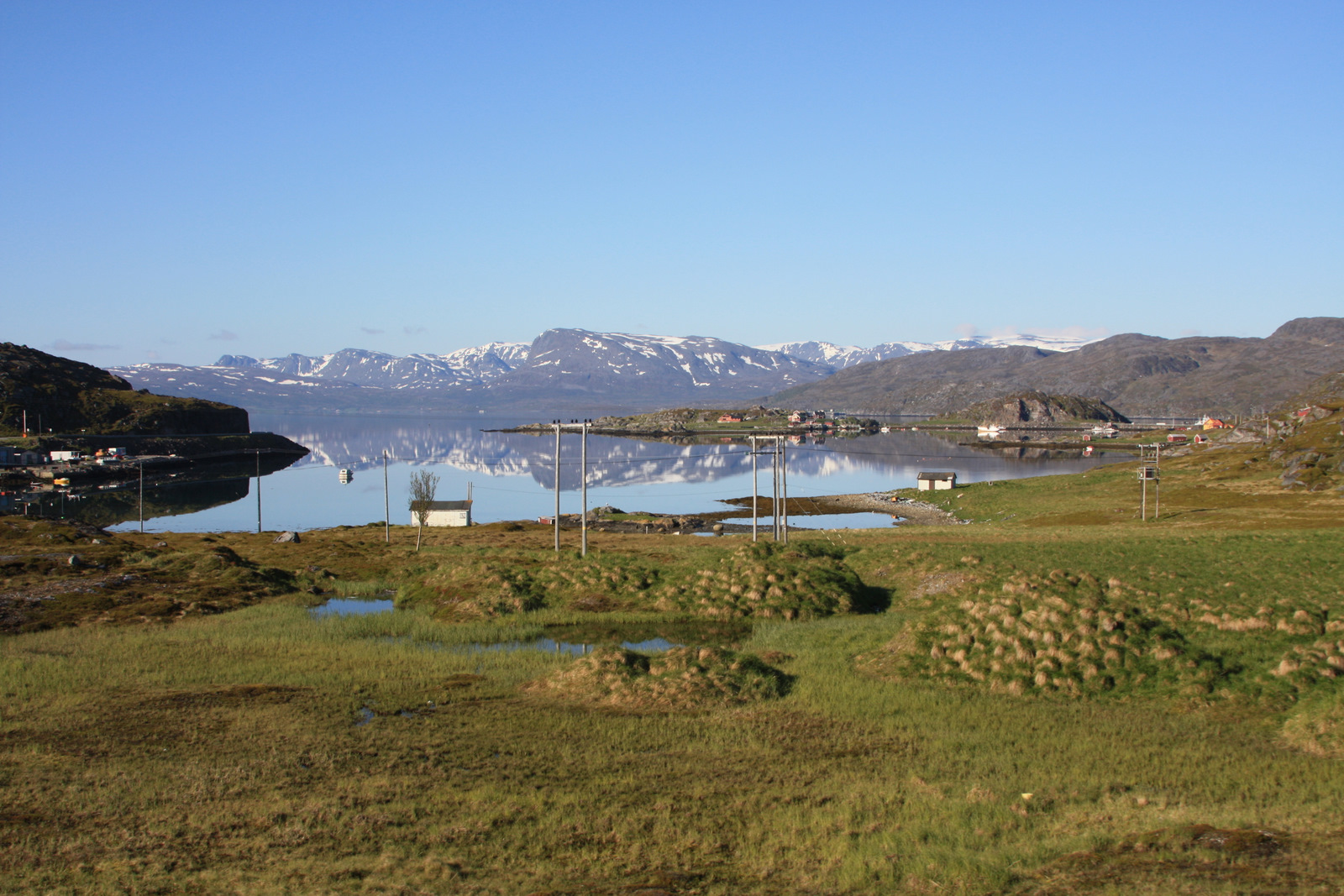
- View of the village
- Interactive map of: Akkarfjord (Norwegian); Áhkkárvuotna (Northern Sami)
- Location within Finnmark Location within Norway
- Coordinates: 70.6122°N 23.64987°E
- Country: Norway
- Region: Northern Norway
- County: Finnmark
- District: Vest-Finnmark
- Municipality: Hammerfest Municipality
- Elevation: 12 m (39 ft)
- Time zone: UTC+01:00 (CET)
  - Summer (DST): UTC+02:00 (CEST)
- Post Code: 9650 Akkarfjord

Akkarfjord (Norwegian) or Áhkkárvuotna (Northern Sami) is a small fishing village in Hammerfest Municipality in Finnmark county, Norway. The village is located on the northeastern coast of the island of Sørøya, about 18 kilometres (11 mi) to the northwest of the town of Hammerfest. As of 2016, about 70 people live in Akkarfjord and they have a post office, grocery shop, school, and kindergarten. The village is only accessible by boat from Hammerfest.
