= Kvaløya, Finnmark =

Island in Norway

Kvaløya (Norwegian); Fálá (Northern Sami)
- Interactive map of: Kvaløya (Norwegian); Fálá (Northern Sami)

Geography
- Location: Finnmark, Norway
- Coordinates: 70°36′N 23°51′E
- Area: 336 km^{2} (130 sq mi)
- Highest elevation: 629 m (2064 ft)
- Highest point: Svartfjellet

Administration
- Norway
- County: Finnmark
- Municipality: Hammerfest Municipality

Demographics
- Population: 10,351 (2026)
- Pop. density: https://www.ssb.no/en/statbank/table/04317

Kvaløya (Norwegian) or Fálá (Northern Sami) is a large island in Finnmark county, Norway. The 336-square-kilometre (130 sq mi) island is located in Hammerfest Municipality. The town of Hammerfest is located on the western shore of the island. Other villages on the island include Forsøl, Rypefjord, and Stallogargo. The Kvalfjorden is a small fjord that cuts into the northeast coast of the island at the village of Forsøl.

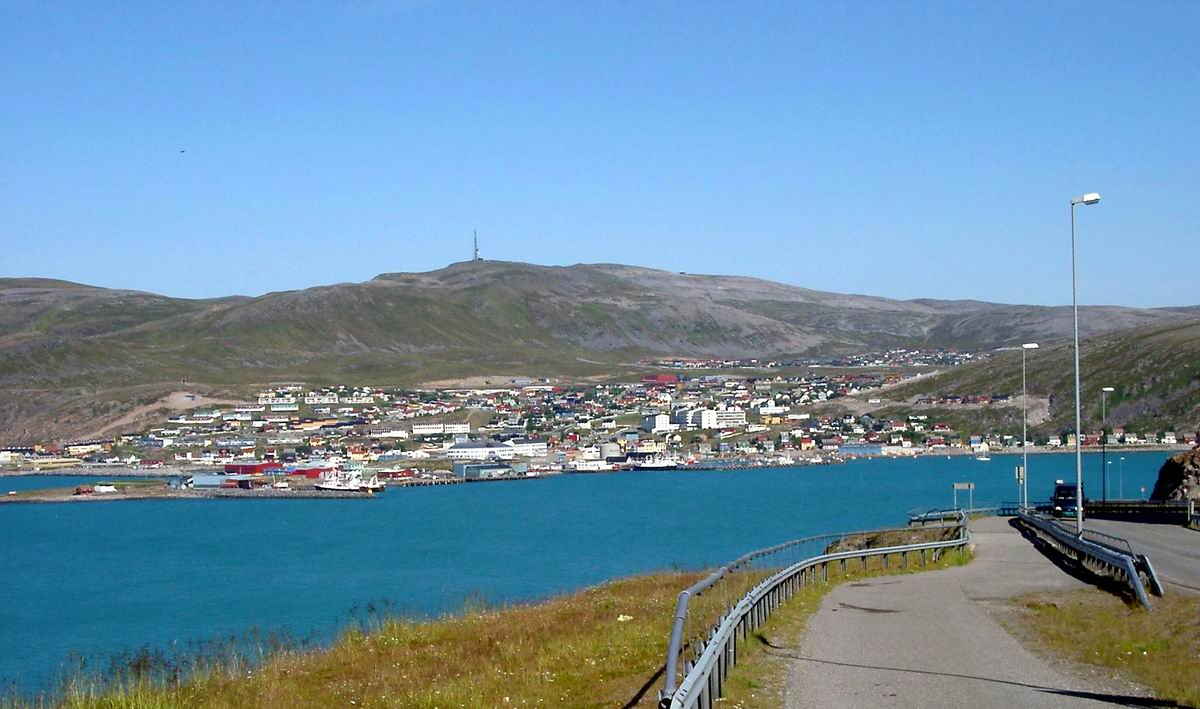
Hammerfest, the largest settlement and only town on Kvaløya

The island is connected to the mainland via Norwegian National Road 94 which crosses the Kvalsund Bridge in the southern part of the island. Most of the settlements on the island are on the western shore along National Road 94. There is a ferry connection between Kvaløya and the island of Seiland to the southwest. The highest point on the mountainous island is the 629-metre (2,064 ft) tall mountain Svartfjellet.

== See also ==
- List of islands of Norway
