= Umar Gombe =

Nigerian actor (born 1983)

- Born: Umar Sani Labaran; 5 April 1983 (age 43); Gombe, Nigeria
- Education: BSc. Information Technology and Business Information System
- Alma mater: Middlesex University Dubai
- Occupations: Actor, film maker, Producer
- Years active: 2001–present
- Notable credit: Best known for his appearance in Shaida

Umar Sani Labaran (born 5 April 1983), also known as Umar Gombe, is a Nigerian actor, filmmaker, and Film director who has appeared in over a hundred movies as well as a number of television and comedy shows. Gombe is the first program manager for Northflix, a Hausa movie streaming app. He has appeared in films, television shows, radio shows, and comedy shows. He has been nominated for best supporting actor several times and has won several other awards.

== Early life and education ==
Gombe was born into the Kano family on 5 April 1983, in Gombe State, Nigeria. He is the son of Malam Sani Labaran, a farmer, elder statesman and member of the Arewa Consultative Forum. From 1986 to 1998, he attended nursery, primary, and secondary schools in Gombe State, then part of Bauchi State. He continued his education at Bayero University Kano and New World Professional Computer Institute, where he earned diplomas in public administration and in data processing and information technology respectively. Gombe has a bachelor of science in information technology and business information systems from Middlesex University, Dubai, and later enrolled in an MBA program at Nigeria's National Open University.

In 2014, Gombe participated in a film training program at the Asian Academy of Film and Television, Noida in India, a United Nations Program, alongside other Kannywood actors such as Falalu A Dorayi, Ali Nuhu, Ishaq Sidi Ishaq and Ibrahim Mandawari.

== Acting career ==
Gombe made his debut in Hausa films in 2001 with Shaida, eventually becoming a leading actor in Fasaha Films before moving on to ISI Films, which was founded by renowned filmmaker Ishaq Sidi Ishaq, and later Kumbo Productions, which produced the blockbuster film Sanafahna, which was shot in Nigeria and in Niger. He appeared in several Kumbo Productions films, including Armala, Noor, and Sanafahna.

Gombe rose to prominence after appearing in Netflix's Nollywood English film, Tenant of the House, directed by Kunle Afolayan and Adieu Salut, as well as other Hausa films such as Kwalla, Lambar Girma, Noor, Lissafi, Iko, and In Zaki So Ni. With roles in films such as Lissafi, Noor, Mati A Zazzau, Kishiyata, Fati, Wakili, Hauwa Kulu, and the television series Gidan Badamasi, Umar has established himself as one of Kannywood's most talented and versatile actors. He also had a significant role in the award-winning Dadin Kowa television series, which was the first Hausa language series to air on Arewa24. Umar also featured in the Nigerian family magazine show, Ongacious season 2.

Gombe was appointed caretaker chairman of the Motion Pictures Practitioners Association of Nigeria in 2021, and later became the body's national assistant secretary following its election in 2022.

== Filmography ==
Gombe made his film debut in the 2001 drama film Shaida, which helped him rise to fame and gain public recognition from many in the industry, which later helped him gain recognition and begin appearing in upcoming Hausa movies. In 2014, he made his television debut in the award-winning drama series Dadin Kowa on Arewa24, followed by a starring role in Netflix Kunle Afolayan's Tenants of the House, a film about conspiracy, dangerous romance, and girl-child education. In 2022, he made his first major appearance in Falalu Dorayi's award-winning controversial comedy television series Gidan Badamasi on Arewa24.

Gombe rose to prominence after appearing in both Gidan Badamasi and Noor, a film about surrogacy to address social issues, directed by Faika Ibrahim Rahi, an award-winning female director.

=== Film ===
Key
†	Denotes films that have not yet been released

Year	Title	Role	Genre	Note
2001	Shaida	Actor	Drama	
2001	Haske	Actor	Drama	
2002	Duhun Damunai	Actor	Drama	
2002	Kwalla	Actor	Drama	
2003	Sansani	Actor	Drama	
2004	Ambaliya	Actor	Drama	
2004	Tutar So	Actor	Drama	
2005	Jarida	Actor	Drama	
2006	Takbir	Actor	Drama	
2006	Lada	Actor	Drama	
2007	Attajira	Actor	Drama	
2007	Nauyi	Actor	Drama	
2008	Iko	Actor	Drama	
2008	Budurwa	Actor	Drama	
2008	Jari Hujja	Actor/Writer	Drama	
2009	Wasila	Actor	Drama	
2009	Wasila (English)	Actor	Drama	
2009	Lissafi	Actor	Drama	
2009	Kusuwar Danga	Actor	Drama	
2010	Wa'azi	Actor	Drama	
2010	Bakar Ashana	Actor/Writer	Thriller	
2010	Fati	Actor	Drama	
2010	Sanafahna 2	Actor	Drama	
2010	Ruwan Dare	Actor	Drama	
2010	Sauyin Lamari	Actor	Drama	
2011	Balele	Actor	Drama	
2011	In Zaki Soni	Actor	Drama	
2011	Noor	Actor/Producer	Drama	
2014	Aci Bulus	Actor (Imran)	Drama	
2014	Armala	Actor/Producer	Drama	
2014	Makuwa	Actor	Drama	
2015	Soyayaya Da Tsakuwa	Actor	Drama	
2017	Samari	Actor	Drama	
2018	Ni Da Kai Da Shi	Actor	Drama	
2019	Tenant Of The House	Actor (John)	Drama	
2019	Gargadi	Actor/Producer	Drama	Short film
2020	Mati A Zazzau	Actor (Garba)	Comedy/Drama	
2021	Hauwa Kulu	Actor	Drama	
2021	Wakili	Actor	Comedy/Drama	
2021	Ameer †	Actor	Action/Drama	Short film
2022	Tsayin Daka	Actor	Drama	
2022	Maimunatu	Actor	Drama	
2022	Halima’s Choice †	Actor	SciFi	

=== Television ===
Year	Title	Role	Genre	Notes
2014	Dadin Kowa	Actor	Drama	Series regular (13 episodes)
2018	Yan Birni (Makewayi)	Actor	Drama	A film powered by UNICEF
2019	Yan Zamani	Actor	Comedy/Drama	
2021	Gidan Danger	Actor	Drama	Series regular (13 episodes)
2021	Bugun Zuciya	Actor	Drama	
2021	Yan Tagwaye †	Producer	Drama	
2022	Gidan Badamasi	Actor (Abduljalal)	Comedy/Drama	Series regular (13 episodes)
2022	Kishiyata	Actor	Drama	
2022	Sawun Giwa	Actor	Drama	
2022	Nasaba †	Actor/Producer	Drama	

=== Voice Over ===
Year	Title	Role	Genre	Notes
2010	Ruwan Dare	Actor (Ismail)	Drama	Featured as a voice actor
2021	Madubi	Actor	Drama	Featured as a voice actor
