= Aluek trei ngeat =

Cambodian salad

- Alternative names: trei ngeat ovlek
- Type: salad
- Place of origin: Cambodia
- Main ingredients: watermelon, dried fish
- Ingredients generally used: scallions, coriander leaves, mango, lime juice

Aluek trei ngeat (Khmer: ឪឡឹកត្រីងៀត) is a Cambodian dried fish and watermelon salad.

== Preparation and serving ==
Cured and sun dried snakehead or cod pan fried or grilled on a charcoal stove is lightly pounded in a pestle or with the handle of a knife or spoon or roughly chopped. The fish is sometimes seasoned with a chicken soup base mix and/or crushed chili. It is then combined with cubes of peeled and deseeded watermelon, finely chopped scallions, coarsely chopped coriander leaves, ripe mango and seasoned with lime juice. The dish is also sometimes served with steamed rice.
