= Dried fish =

Fish preserved by drying

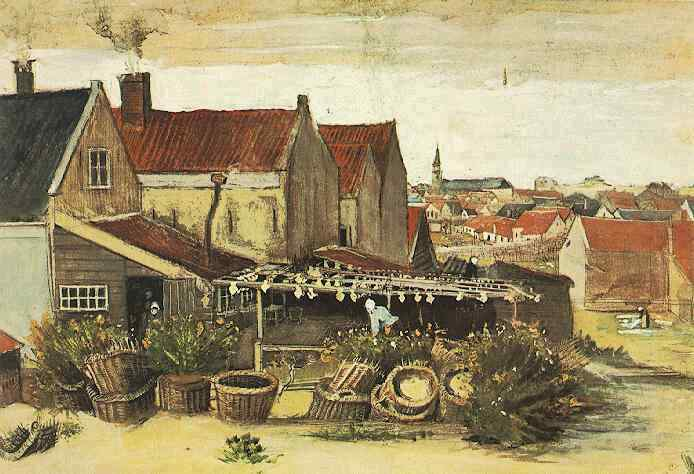
Fish barn with fish drying in the sun – Van Gogh 1882

Fresh fish rapidly deteriorates unless some way can be found to preserve it. Drying is a method of food preservation that works by removing water from the food, which inhibits the growth of microorganisms. Open-air drying using sun and wind has been practiced since ancient times to preserve food. Water is usually removed by evaporation (air-drying, sun-drying, smoking or wind-drying) but in the case of freeze-drying, food is first frozen and then the water is removed by sublimation. Bacteria, yeasts and molds need the water in the food to grow, and drying effectively prevents them from surviving in the food.

Fish are preserved through such traditional methods as drying, smoking and salting. The oldest traditional way of preserving fish was to let the wind and sun dry it. Drying food is the world's oldest known preservation method, and dried fish have a storage life of several years. The method is cheap and effective in suitable climates; the work can be done by the fisherman and family, and the resulting product is easily transported to market.

== Types ==
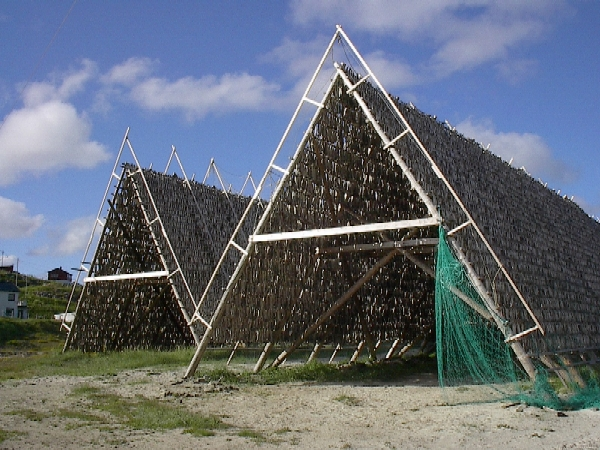
A fish flake, such as this one in Norway, is a rack used for drying cod.

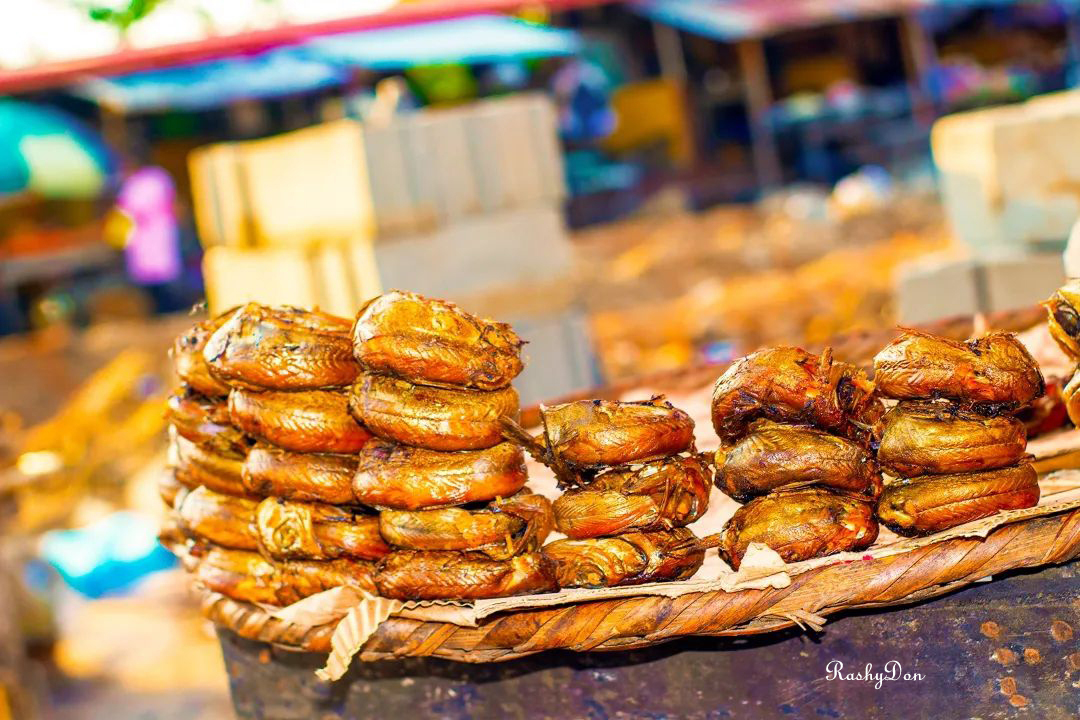
Eja kika, a smoked and sun-dried fish in Yorubaland

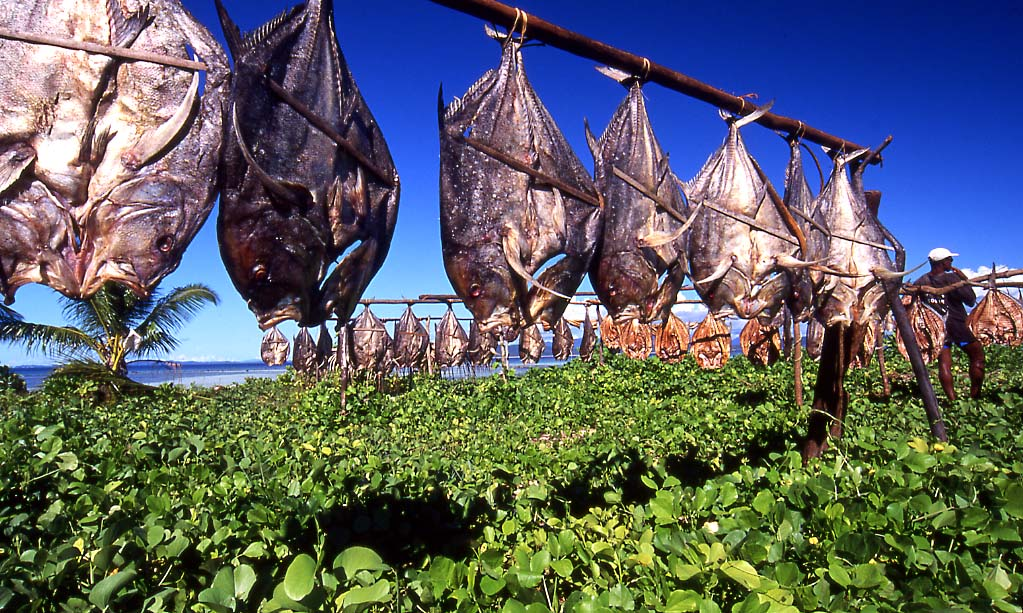
Flattened fish drying in the sun in Madagascar

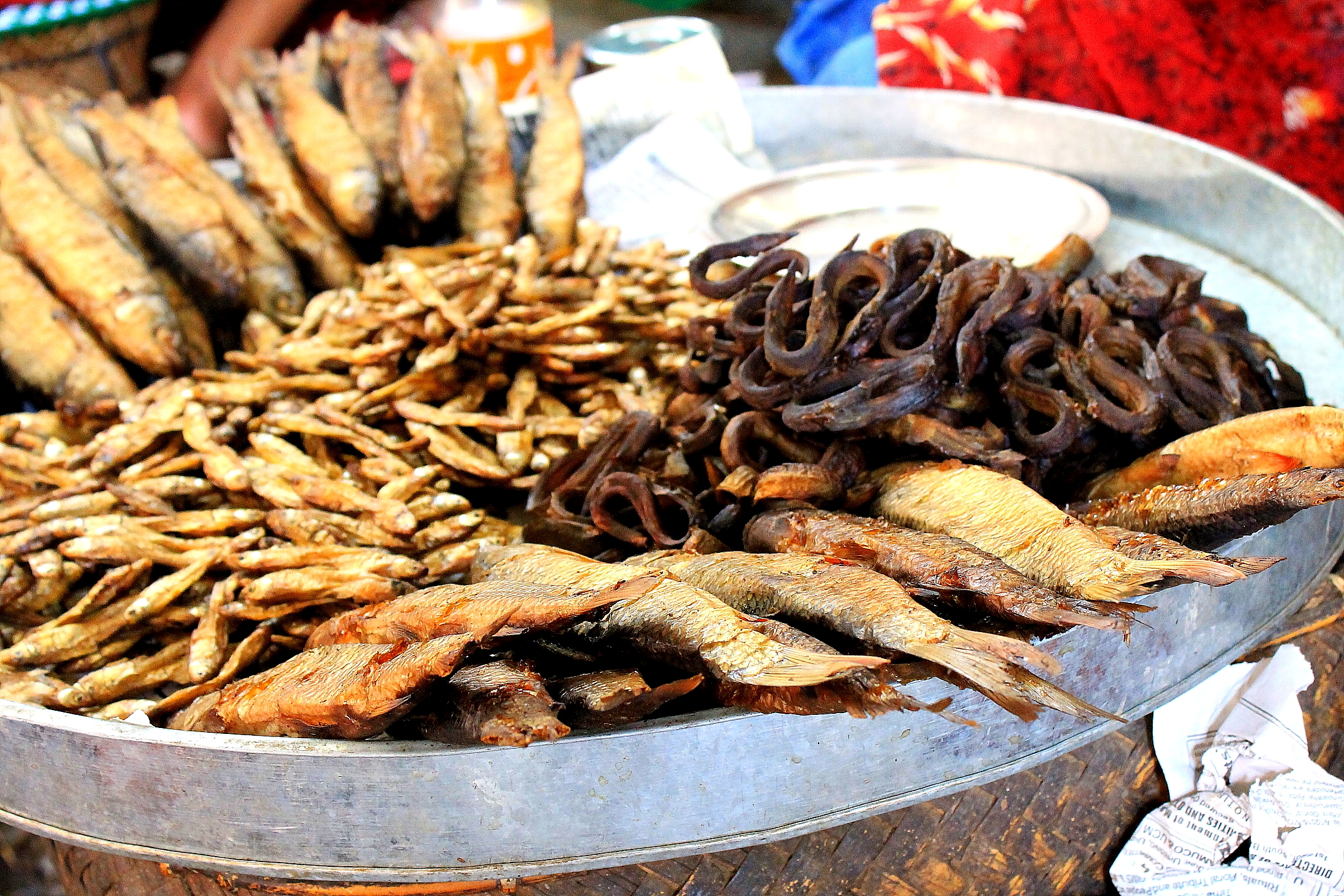
Assorted dried fish in Imphal, Manipur, India

=== Stockfish ===
Stockfish is unsalted fish, especially cod, dried by cold air and wind on wooden racks on the foreshore. The drying racks are known as fish flakes. Cod is the most common fish used in stockfish production, though other whitefish, such as pollock, haddock, ling and cusk, are also used.

=== Clipfish ===
Over the centuries, several variants of dried fish have evolved. Stockfish, dried as fresh fish and not salted, is often confused with clipfish, in which the fish is salted before drying. After 2–3 weeks in salt the fish has saltmatured and is transformed from wet salted fish to clipfish through a drying process. The salted fish was earlier dried on rocks (clips) on the foreshore. The production method for clipfish (or bacalhau in Portuguese) was developed by the Portuguese, who first mined salt near the brackish water of Aveiro and brought it to Newfoundland, where cod was available in tremendous quantities. Salting was not economically feasible until the 17th century, when cheap salt from southern Europe became available to the maritime nations of northern Europe.

Stockfish is cured in a process called fermentation in which cold-adapted bacteria matures the fish, similar to the maturing process of cheese. Clipfish is processed in a chemical curing process called saltmaturing, similar to the maturing processes of other saltmatured products like Parma ham.

=== Other ===
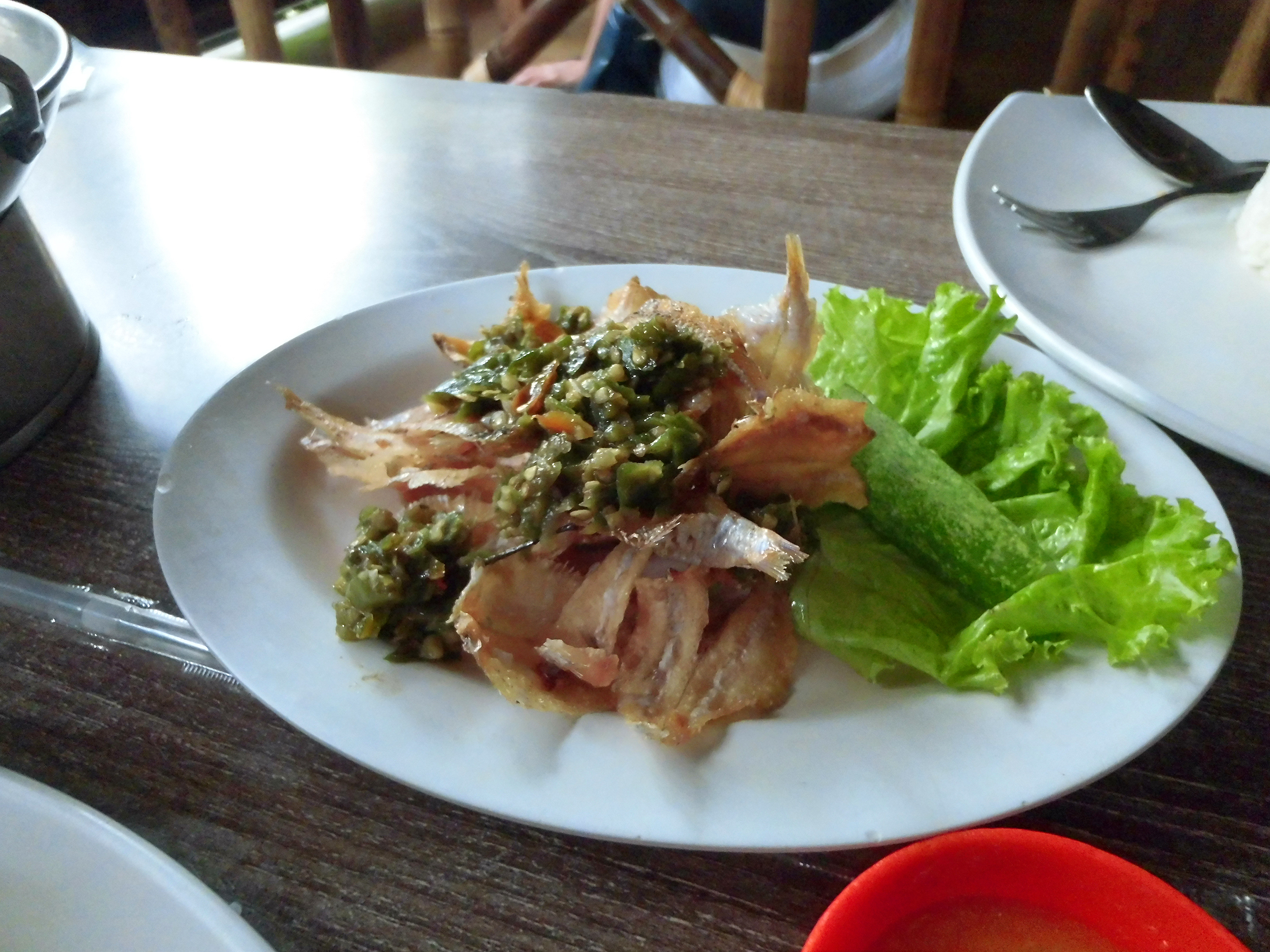
Ikan asin cabe ijo, salted dried fish served with green chili, an Indonesian dish

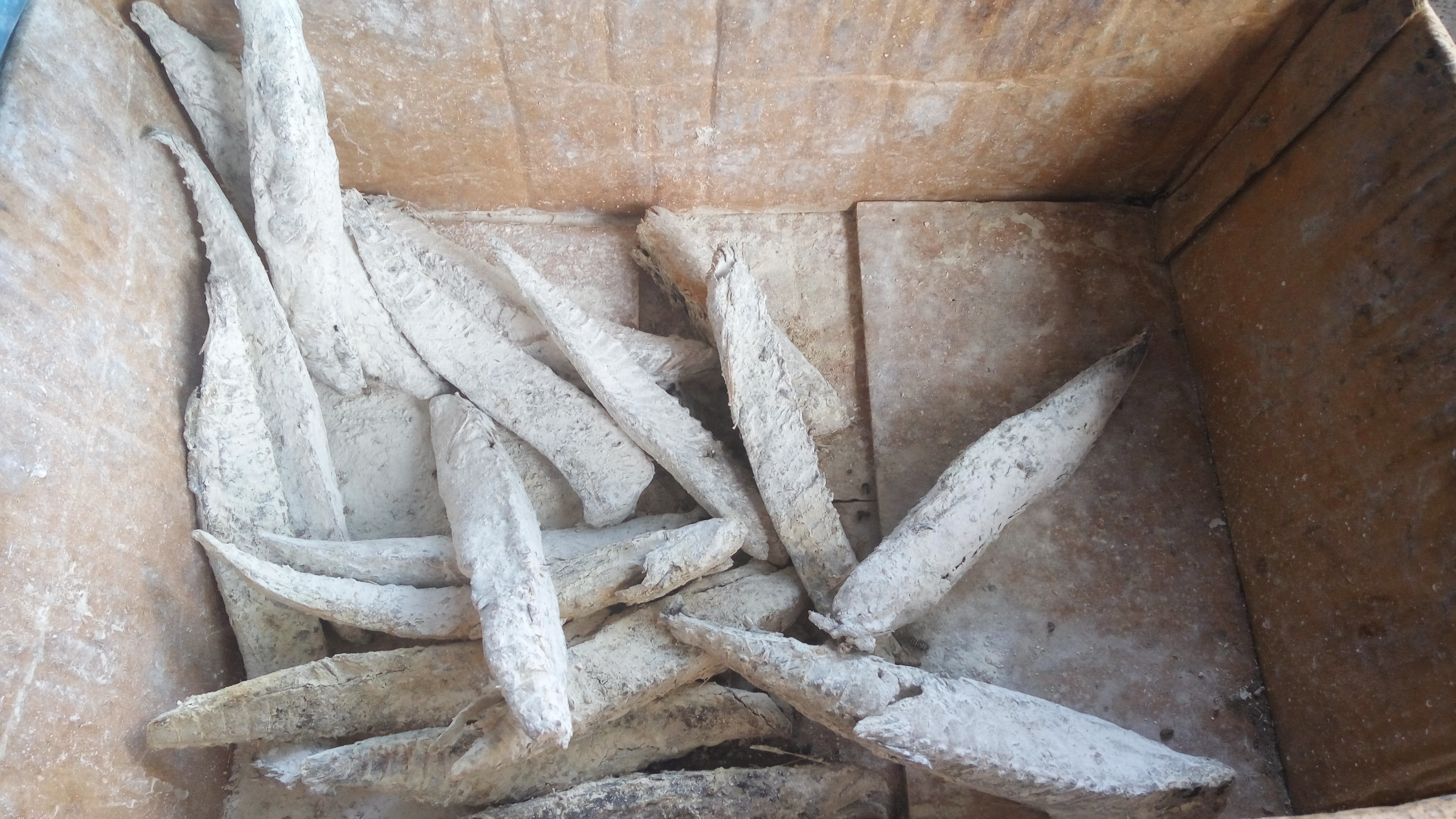
Keumamah, traditional Acehnese dried fish

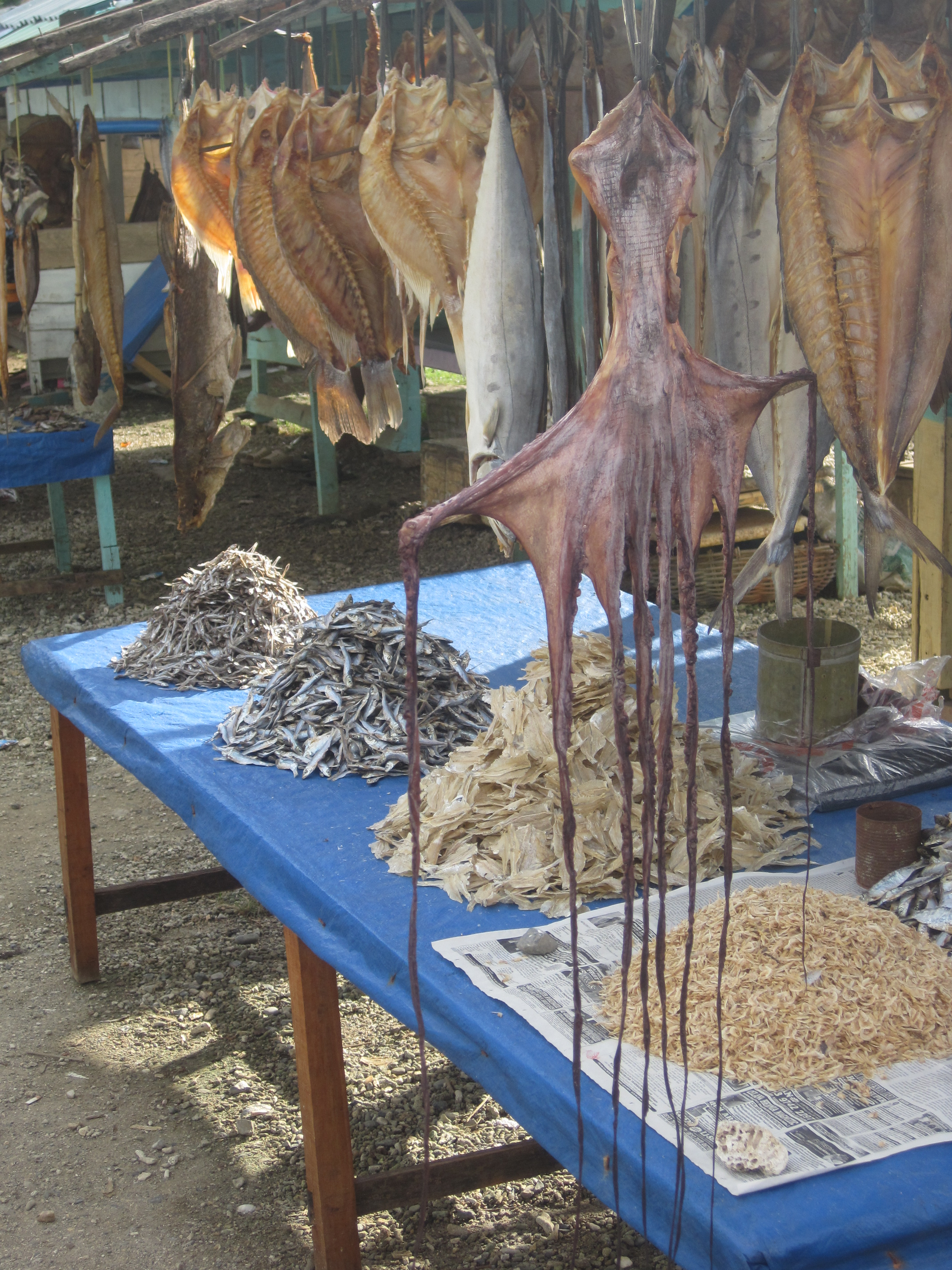
Dried fish and octopus in Aceh, Indonesia

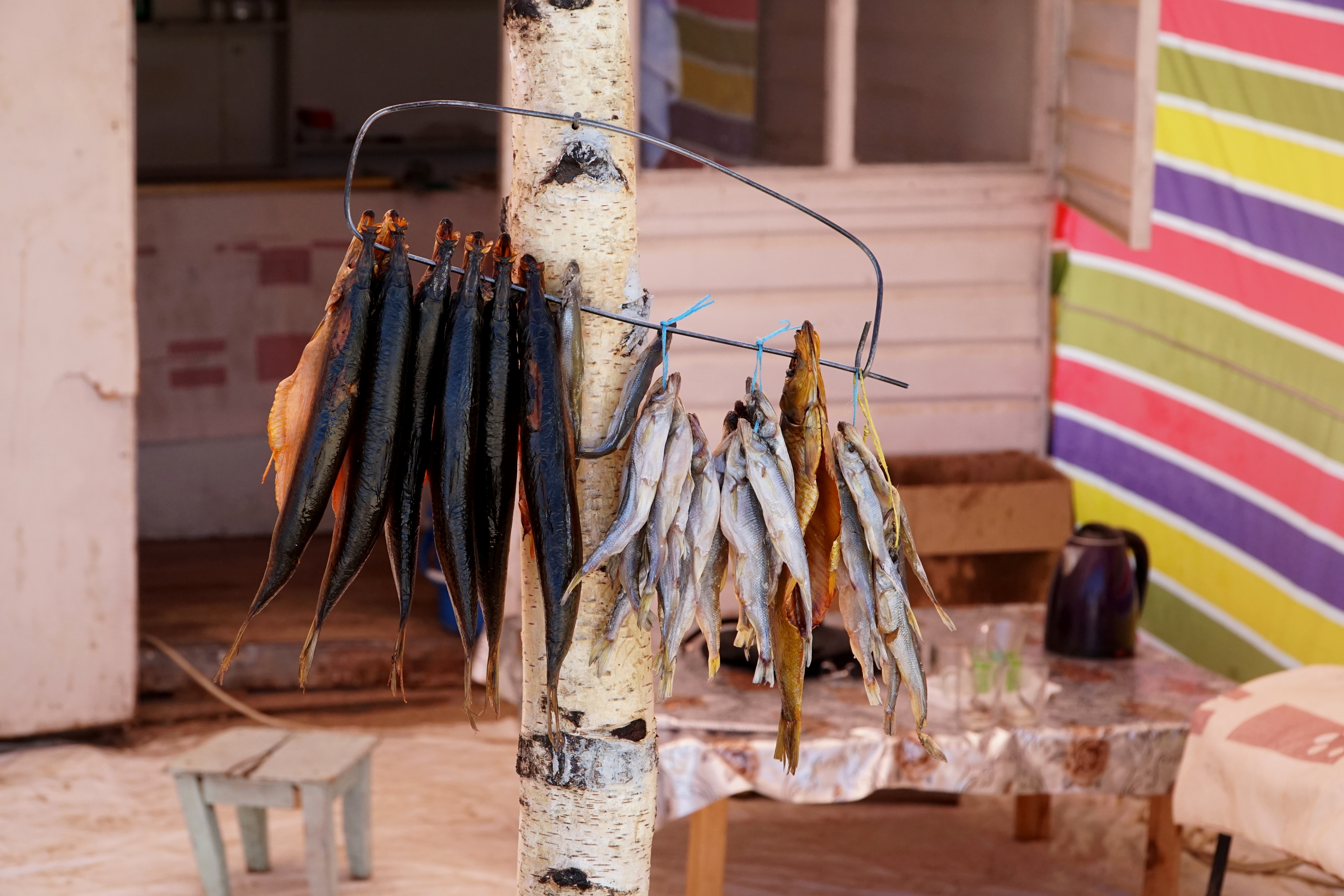
Dried fish on sale in Kyrgyzstan

- Bacalhau is the Portuguese word for codfish and in a culinary context refers to dried and salted codfish. Fresh (unsalted) cod is referred to as bacalhau fresco (fresh cod). Bacalhau dishes are common in Portugal and Galicia, in the northwest of Spain, and to a lesser extent in former Portuguese colonies like Angola, Macau, and Brazil. There are said to be over 1000 recipes in Portugal alone and it can be considered the iconic ingredient of Portuguese cuisine (yet the only fish that is not consumed fresh in this fish-loving nation). It is often cooked on social occasions and is the Portuguese traditional Christmas dinner in some parts of the country.
- Baccalà (bacalà in the Venetian language) is sun-dried stockfish, rather than salt cod. In other parts of Italy, dishes made with salt cod are given the same name. Baccalà dishes made with stockfish are soaked for several days to soften the fish. Salt cod, which is already soft, is also soaked to remove excess salt.
- Balyk is the Russian term for the salted and dried soft parts of fish of large valuable species, such as sturgeon or salmon. Over time, the term has come to apply also to smoked fish of these species.
- Boknafisk is a variant of stockfish and is unsalted fish partially dried by sun and wind on drying flakes or on a wall. The most common fish used for boknafisk is cod, but other types of fish can also be used. If herring is used, the dish is called boknasild.
- Bugeo refers to dried Alaska pollock.
- Daing (also known as bulad or tuyô) refers to sun-dried fish in the Philippines. Almost any kind of fish is used, but the most common variant uses rabbitfish (locally known as danggit). Cuttlefish and squid may also be dried this way The amount of drying can vary. In the labtingaw variant, the drying period only lasts a few hours, allowing the fish to retain some moisture and texture. In the lamayo variant, the fish is not dried at all, but simply marinated in vinegar, garlic and spices.
- Dried squid
- Eja kika : A Yoruba smoked dried fish. Smoking can also be combined with sun-drying. Eja kika involves several types of fish; the techniques are used not only to preserve fish for longer shelf life, but to enhance the flavor for greater effect in for dishes prepared with the fish.
- Fesikh is a traditional Egyptian fish dish consisting of fermented salted and dried gray mullet, of the mugil family, a saltwater fish that lives in both the Mediterranean and the Red Seas. The traditional process of preparing it is to dry the fish in the sun before preserving it in salt.
- Gwamegi is a Korean half-dried Pacific herring or Pacific saury made during winter. It is mostly eaten in the region of North Gyeongsang Province such as Pohang, Uljin, and Yeongdeok, where a large amount of the fish are harvested. Guryongpo Harbor in Pohang is the most famous. Fresh herring or saury is frozen at -10 degrees Celsius and is placed outdoors in December to repeat freezing at night and thawing in the day. The process continues until the water content of the fish drops to approximately 40%.
- Hákarl is an Icelandic food consisting of a sleeper shark that has been fermented and dried for four or five months.
- Harðfiskur is the Icelandic term for dried fish (stockfish), a delicacy in Iceland (eaten as is or usually with butter). A type of wind-dried fish, called skreið, also dried but including the head, is no longer eaten domestically in modern times but is sold mostly to Nigeria where it is used in soup.
- Hwangtae refers to Alaska pollock dried in winter undergoing freeze-thaw cycle.
- Ikan asin is a dried and salted fish. It is an Indonesian dish and it is often served accompanied with steamed rice and sambal chili paste.
- Jwipo is a kind of Korean fish jerky made by pressing, drying and seasoning filefish.
- Katsuobushi is the Japanese name for dried, fermented, and smoked skipjack tuna, sometimes referred to as bonito.
- A kipper is a whole herring, a small, oily fish, that has been split from tail to head, gutted, salted or pickled, and cold-smoked.
- Kodari refers to half-dried young Alaska pollock.
- Kusaya is a Japanese-style salted, dried and fermented fish. It has a pungent smell, similar to the fermented Swedish herring called surströmming.
- Mackerel (sukho bangdo in Konkani language) has been dried in Goa since ancient times. If preserved well they can stay edible for many years. Prawn and shark are also dried in Goa.
- Maldives fish is cured tuna traditionally produced in the Maldives. It is a staple of Maldivian cuisine, as well as Sri Lankan cuisine.
- Mojama (Spain) consists of filleted salt-cured tuna. The word mojama comes from the Arabic musama (dry), but its origins are Phoenician, specifically from Gdr (Gadir, Cádiz today), the first Phoenician settlement in the Western Mediterranean Sea. The Phoenicians had learned to dry tuna in sea salt so they could trade it. Mojama is made by curing tuna in salt for two days. The salt is then removed, the tuna is washed and then laid out to dry in the sun and the breeze (according to the traditional method) for fifteen to twenty days.
- Niboshi is the Japanese name for dried infant sardines that are both eaten as a snack and used to make soup stock. They are also eaten in Korea.
- Nogari refers to dried young Alaska pollock.
- Obambo is dried tilapia, prepared by cutting the fish open and drying it in the sun for several days. It is popular among the Luo and Luhya tribes, who live along the shores of Lake Victoria in Kenya. Traditionally, fishing was strictly forbidden during the rainy seasons, and people relied on obambo caught earlier and preserved.
- Karuvadu is dried fish, prepared by sun-drying it for several days. This procedure is traditionally seen in coastal areas of Tamil Nadu in India. Various species of fish are sundried; the storage timeline of the dried fish varies from several months to years based on species.
- Tatami iwashi is a Japanese processed food product made from baby sardines laid out and dried while entwined in a single layer to form a large mat-like sheet. Typically, this is done by drying them in the sun on a bamboo frame, a process that is evocative of the manufacture of traditional Japanese paper.
- Bokkoms is whole, salted and dried mullet and is a well-known speciality the West Coast region of South Africa. This salted fish is dried in the sun and wind and is eaten after peeling off the skin. In some cases it is also smoked.

== Water activity ==
The water activity, a_{w}, in a fish is defined as the ratio of the water vapour pressure in the flesh of the fish to the vapour pressure of pure water at the same temperature and pressure. It ranges between 0 and 1, and is a parameter that measures how available the water is in the flesh of the fish. Available water is necessary for the microbial and enzymatic reactions involved in spoilage. There are a number of techniques that have been or are used to tie up the available water or remove it by reducing the a_{w}. Traditionally, techniques such as drying, salting and smoking have been used, and have been used for thousands of years. These techniques can be very simple, for example, by using solar drying. In more recent times, freeze-drying, water binding humectants, and fully automated equipment with temperature and humidity control have been added. Often a combination of these techniques is used.

== History ==
Salt cod has been produced for at least 500 years. Before refrigeration, drying and salting were necessary to preserve taste and nutrients.

The Portuguese tried to use this method of drying and salting on several varieties of fish from their waters, but the ideal fish came from much further north. With the "discovery" of Newfoundland in 1497, long after the Basque whalers arrived in Channel-Port aux Basques, they started fishing its cod-rich Grand Banks. Thus, bacalhau became a staple of the Portuguese cuisine, nicknamed Fiel amigo (faithful friend). From the 18th century, the town of Kristiansund in Norway became an important place of purchasing bacalhau or klippfisk (literally "cliff fish", since the fish was dried on stone cliffs by the sea to begin with.) Since the method was introduced by the Dutchman Jappe Ippes around 1690, the town had produced klippfisk and when the Spanish merchants arrived, it became a big industry. The bacalhau or bacalao dish is sometimes said to originate from Kristiansund, where it was introduced by the Spanish and Portuguese fish buyers and became very popular. Bacalao was common food in northwest Norway to this day, as it was cheap to make. In more recent years, it has become less of an everyday staple and mostly eaten on special occasions.

This dish was also popular in Portugal and other Roman Catholic countries, because of the many days (Fridays, Lent, and other festivals) on which the Church forbade the eating of meat. Bacalhau dishes were eaten instead.

== Gallery ==
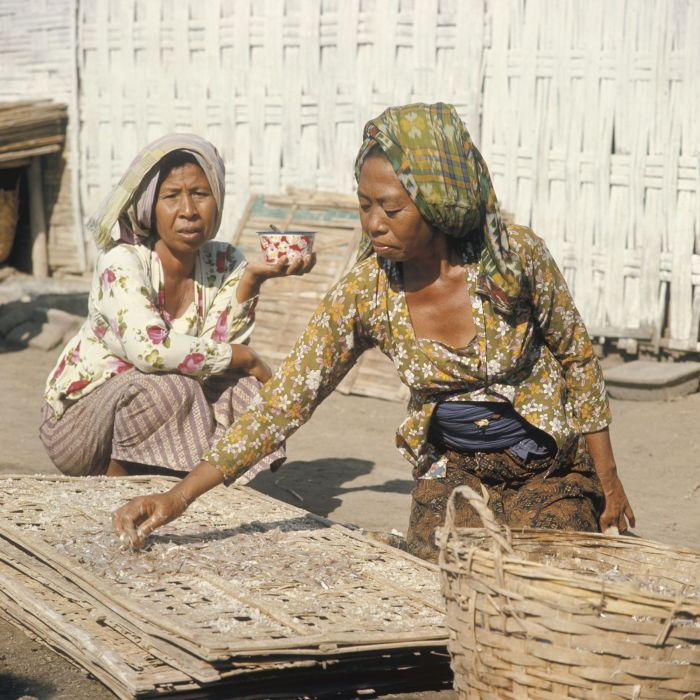
Women drying fish in Indonesia, 1971

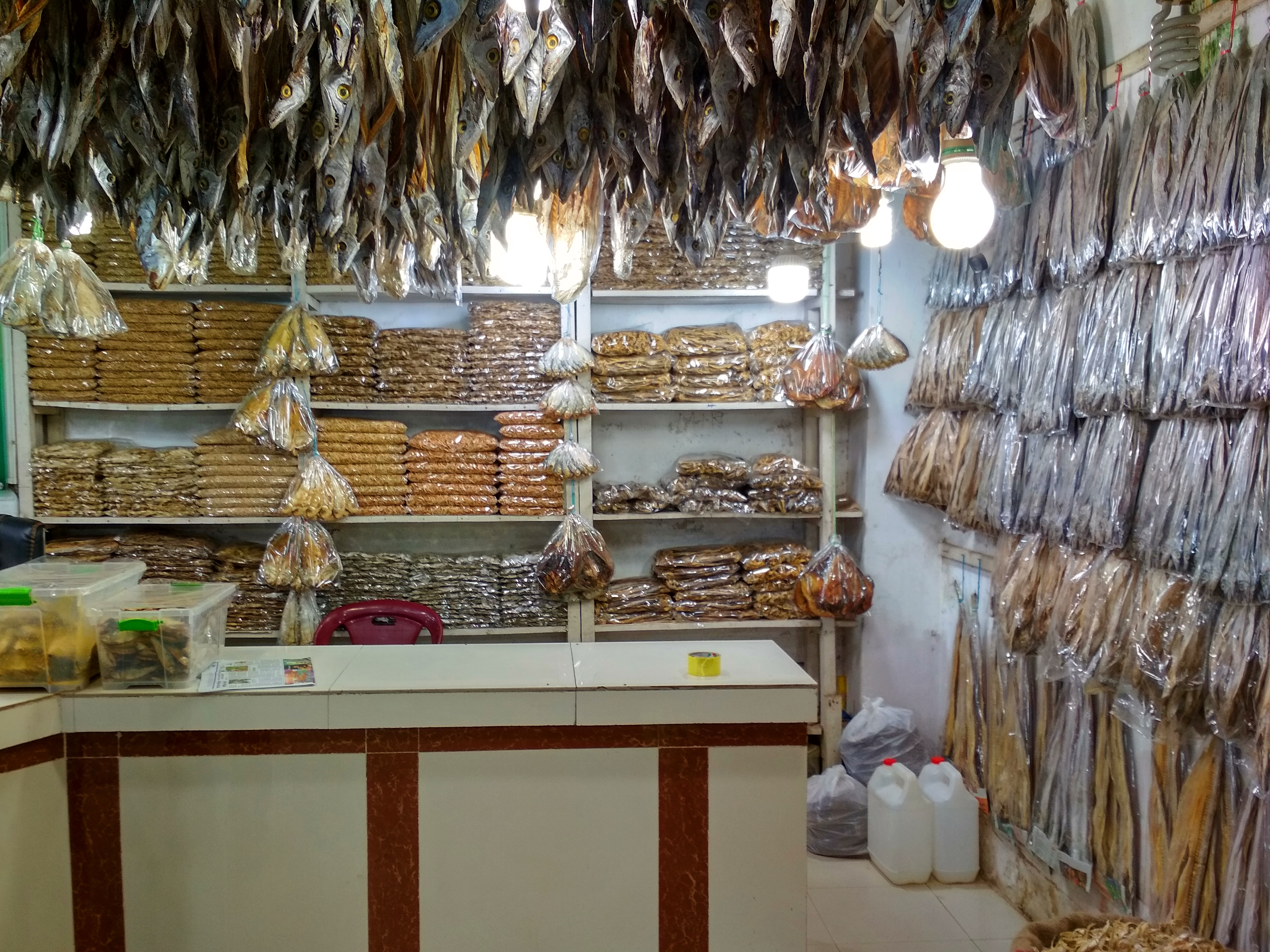
Dried fish shop at Cox's Bazar, Bangladesh

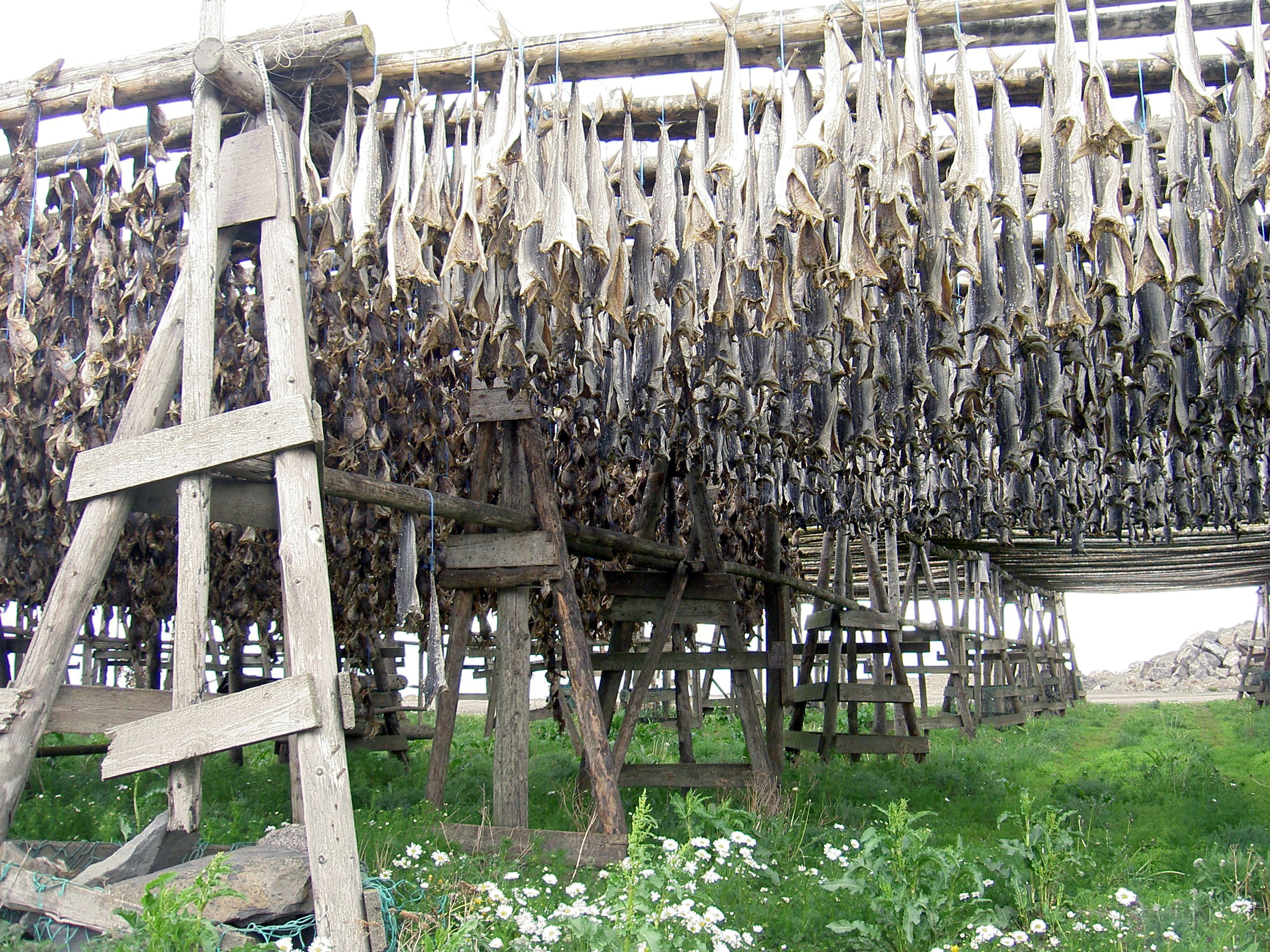
Drying stockfish in Iceland

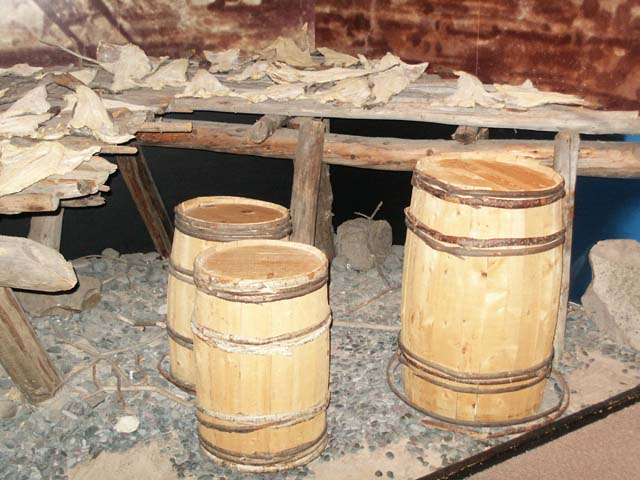
Platforms, called fish flakes, where cod dry in the sun before being packed in salt

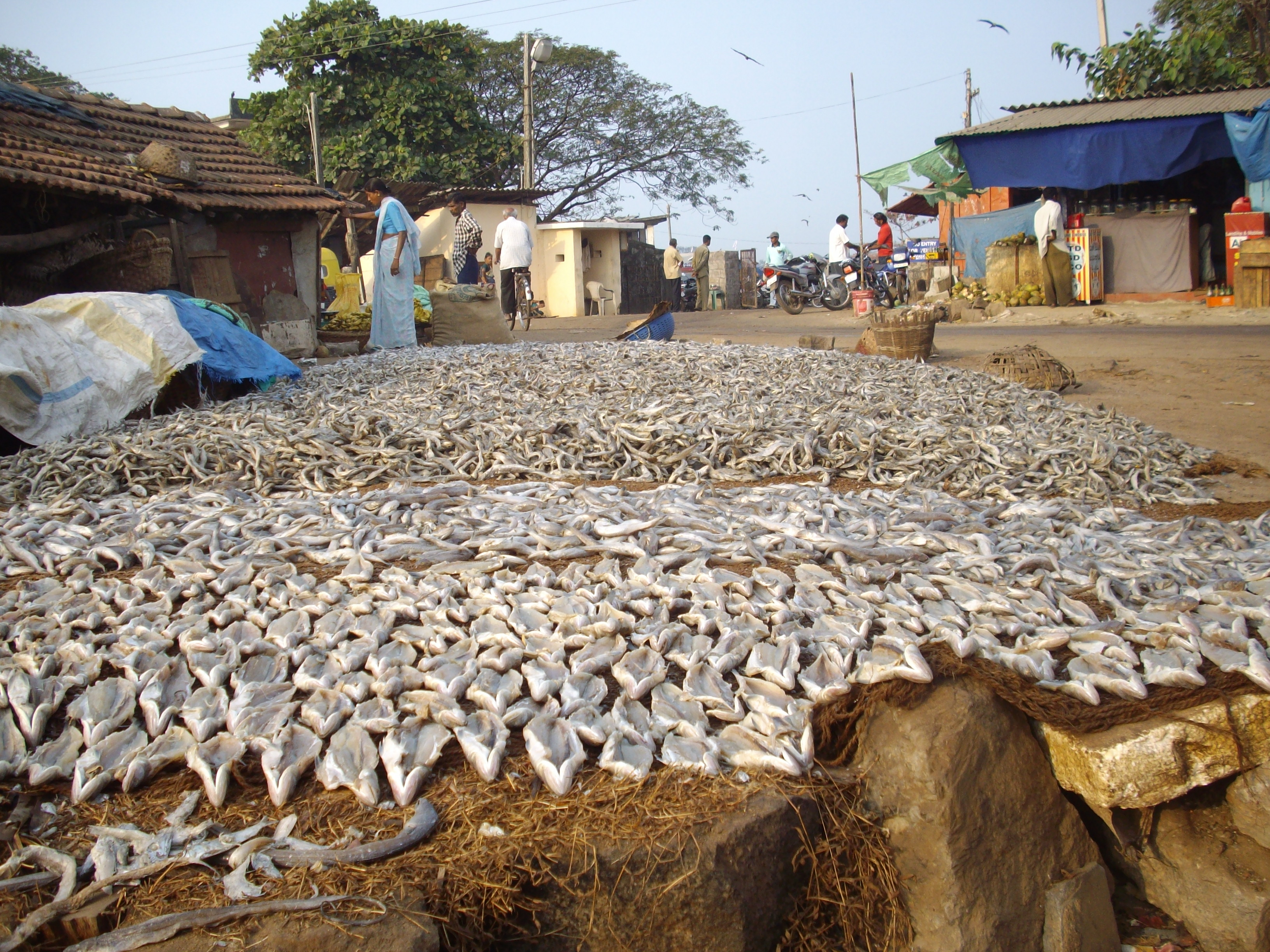
Drying salted fish at Malpe Harbour

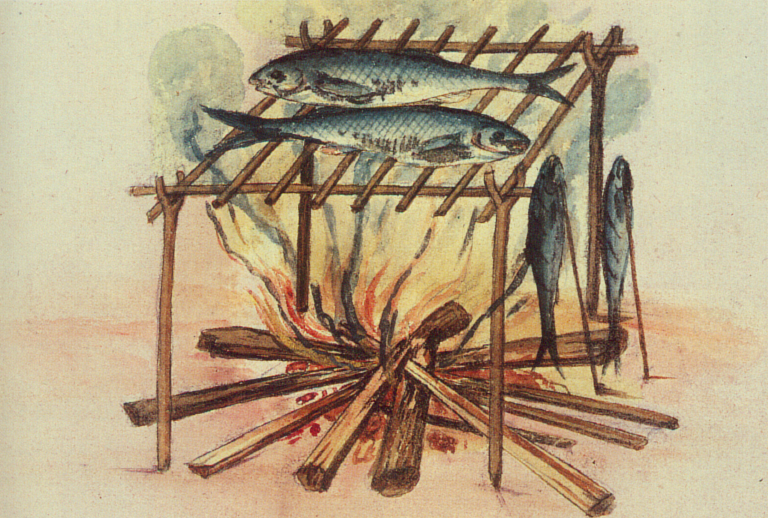
Equipment for curing fish used by the Algonquin

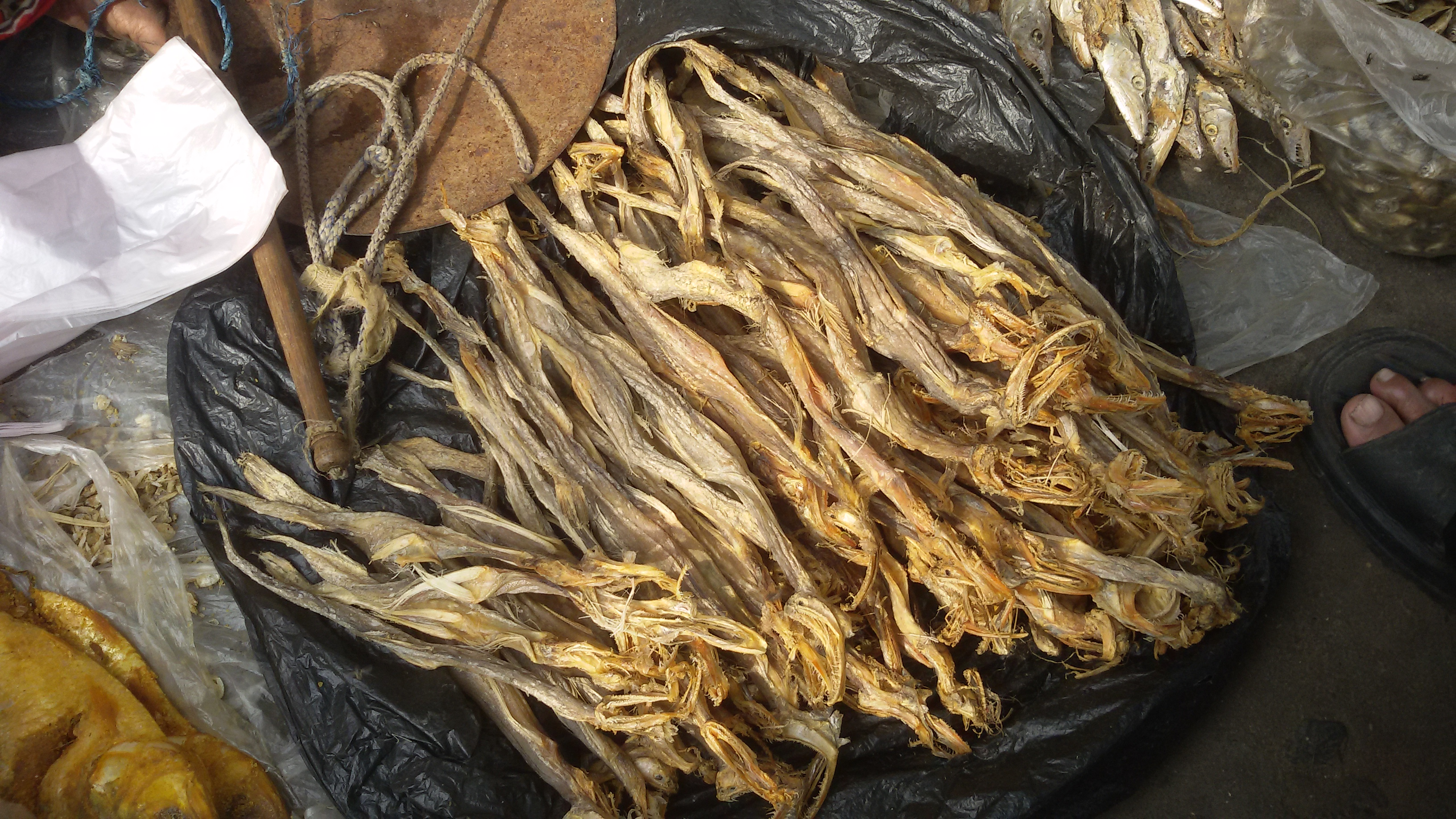
Dried fish on sale in Kolkata, India

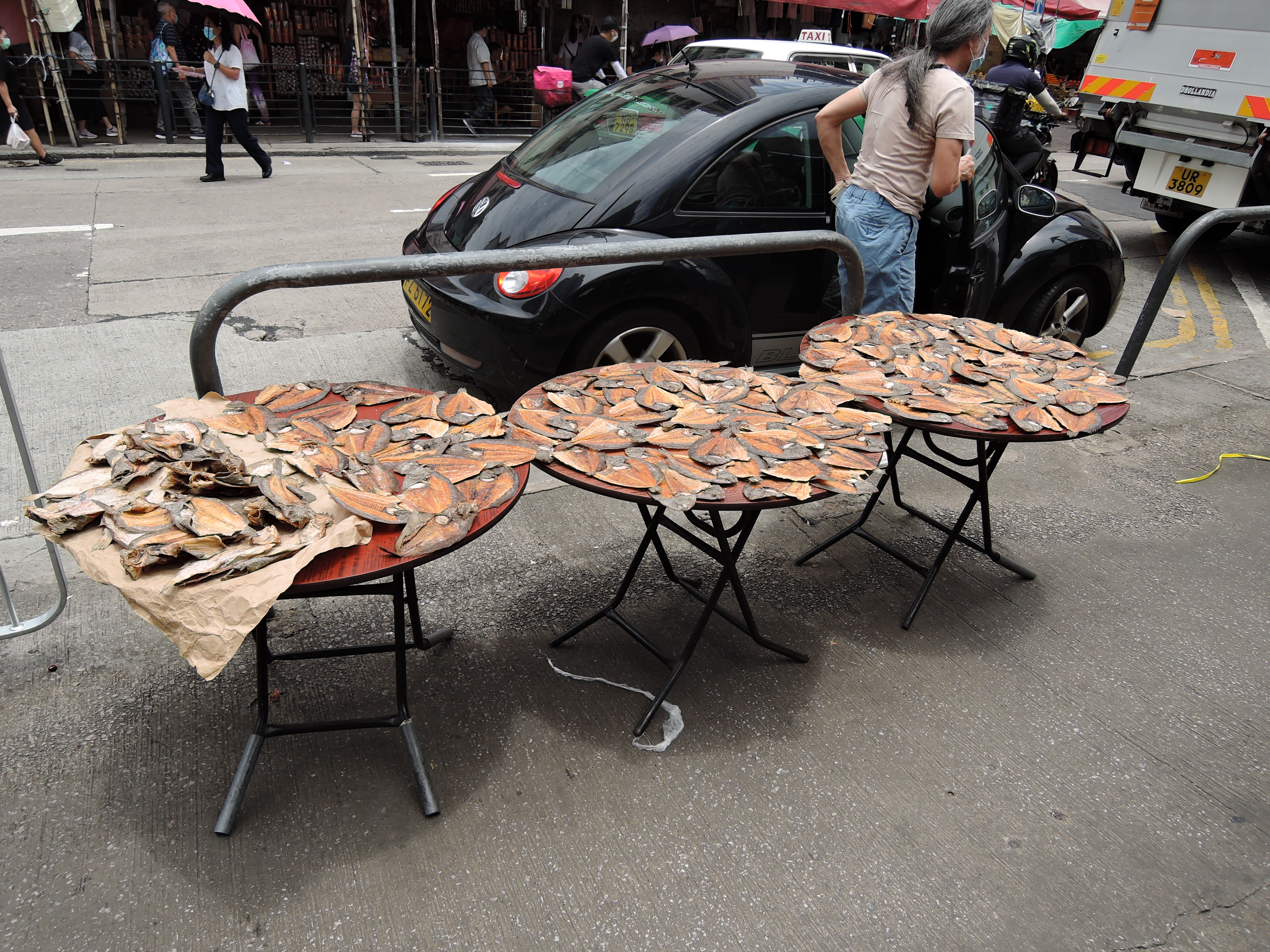
A Dried Flatfishes in the desk from Cantonese Wanton Noodle Shop in Yuen Long, Hong Kong

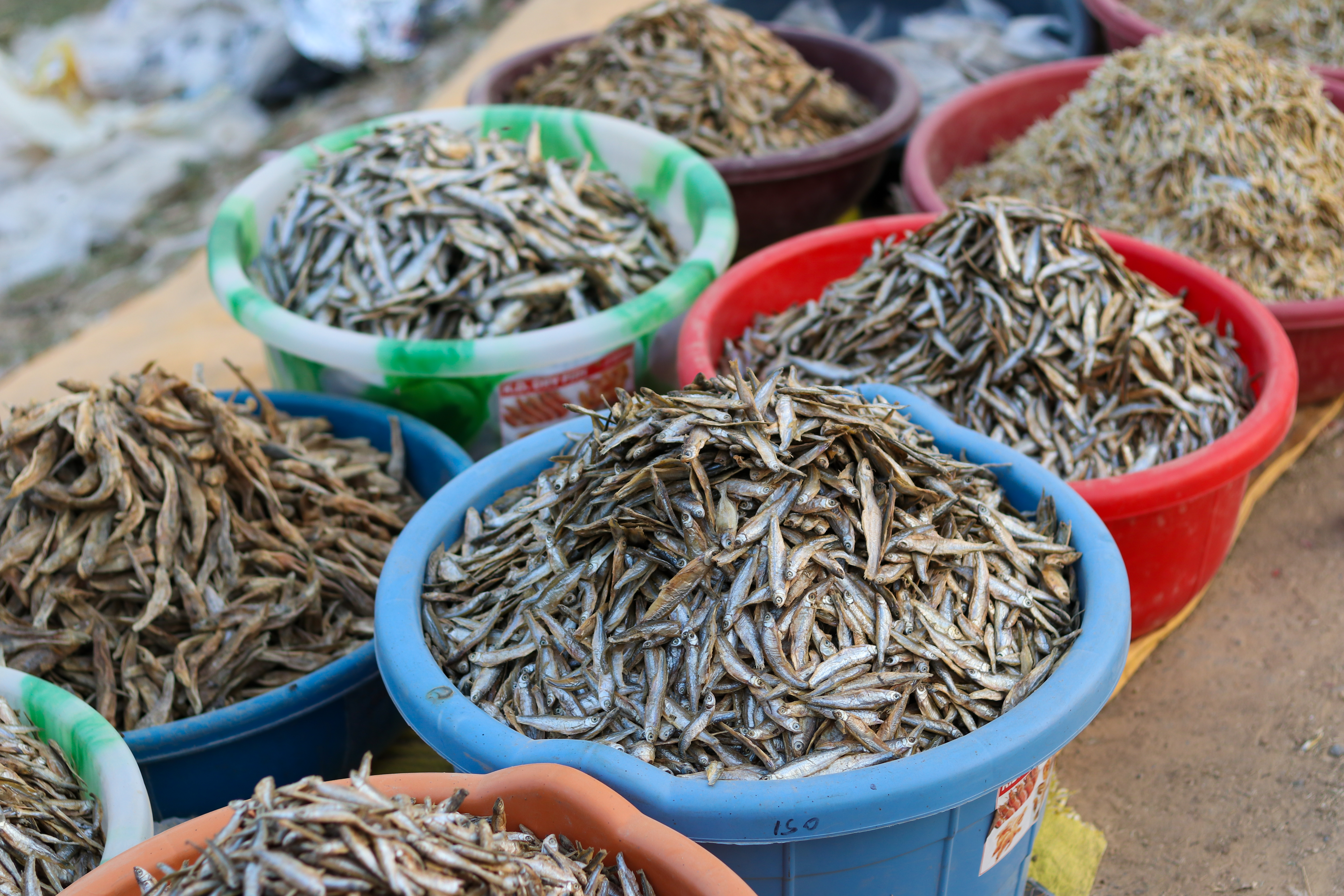
Dried fish in Fareniya Bazar, Indo Nepal Border Trail

== See also ==
- List of dried foods
