= Stockfish =

Air-dried unsalted preserved fish

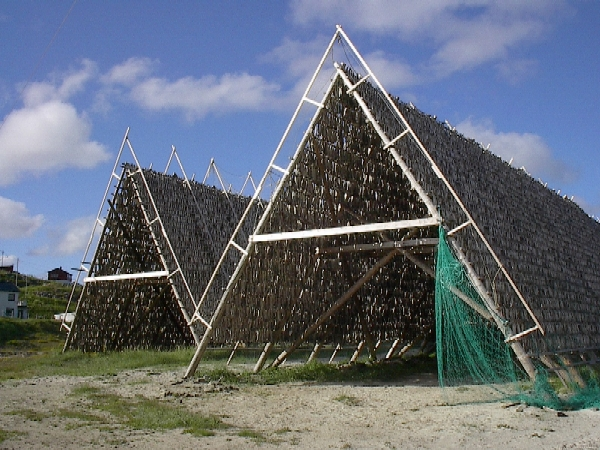
Drying flake ('hjell') in Norway

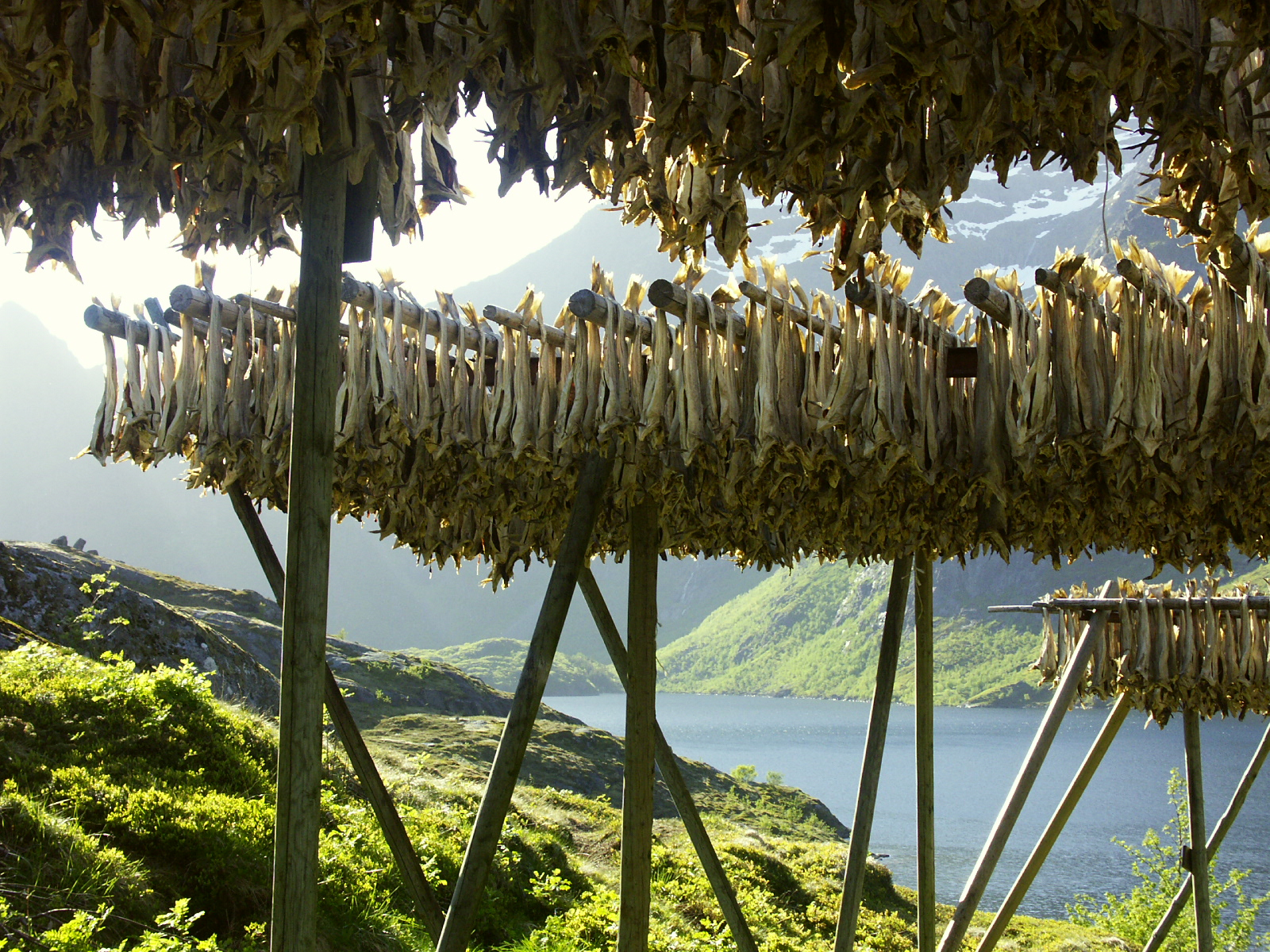
Drying cod in Lofoten Islands

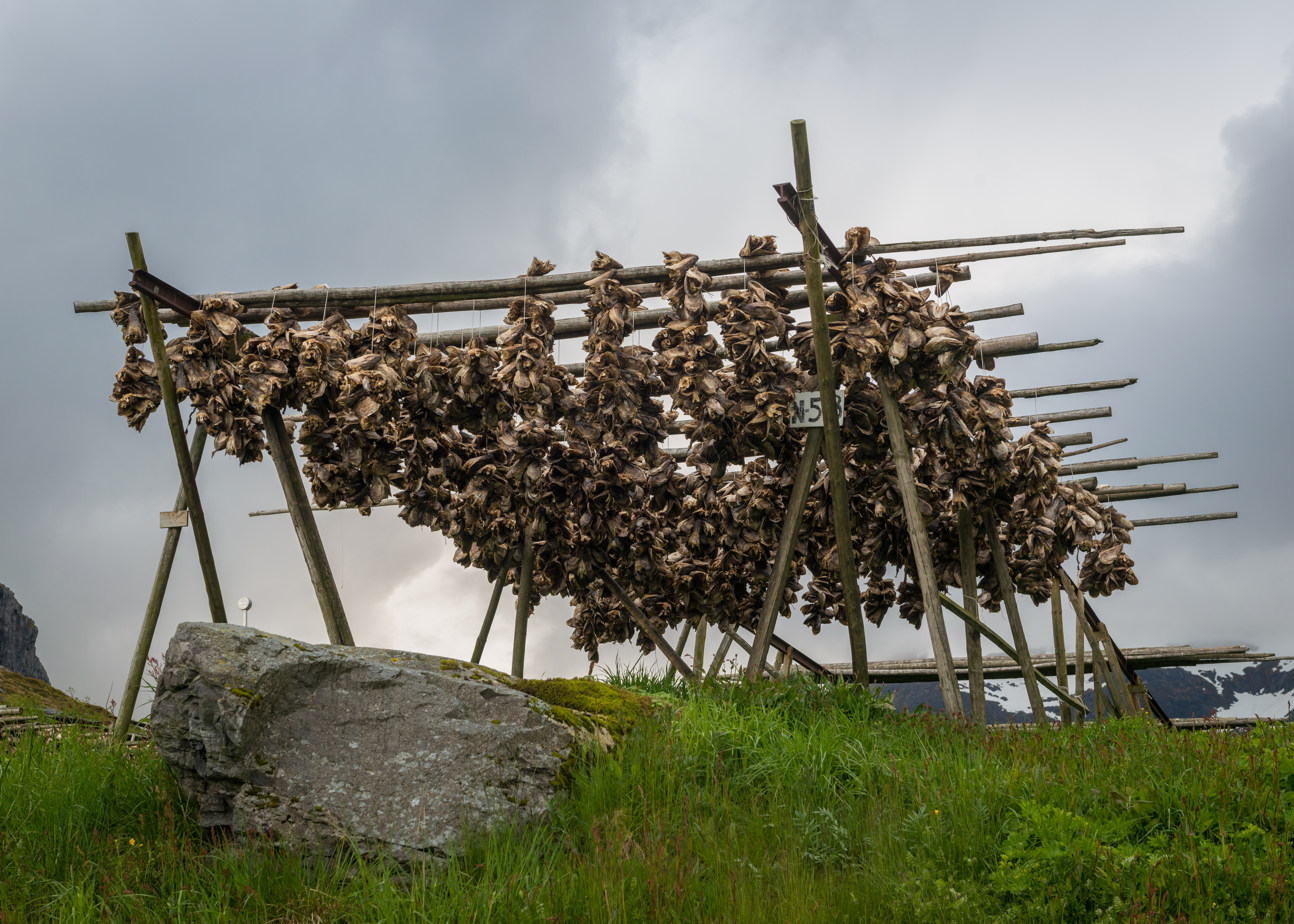
Codfish drying flake in Lofoten Islands

Stockfish is unsalted fish, especially cod, dried by cold air and wind on wooden racks (which are called "hjell" in Norway) on the foreshore. The drying of food is the world's oldest known preservation method, and dried fish has a storage life of several years. The method is cheap and effective in suitable climates; the work can be done by the fisherman and family, and the resulting product is easily transported to market.

Over the centuries, several variants of dried fish have evolved. The stockfish (fresh dried, not salted) category is often mistaken for the klippfisk, or salted cod, category where the fish is salted before drying. Salting was not economically feasible until the 17th century, when cheap salt from southern Europe became available to the maritime nations of northern Europe.

Stockfish is cured in a fermentation process where cold-adapted bacteria matures the fish, similar to the maturing process of cheese.

In English legal records of the medieval period, stock fishmongers are differentiated from ordinary fishmongers when the occupation of a plaintiff or defendant is recorded.

== Etymology ==
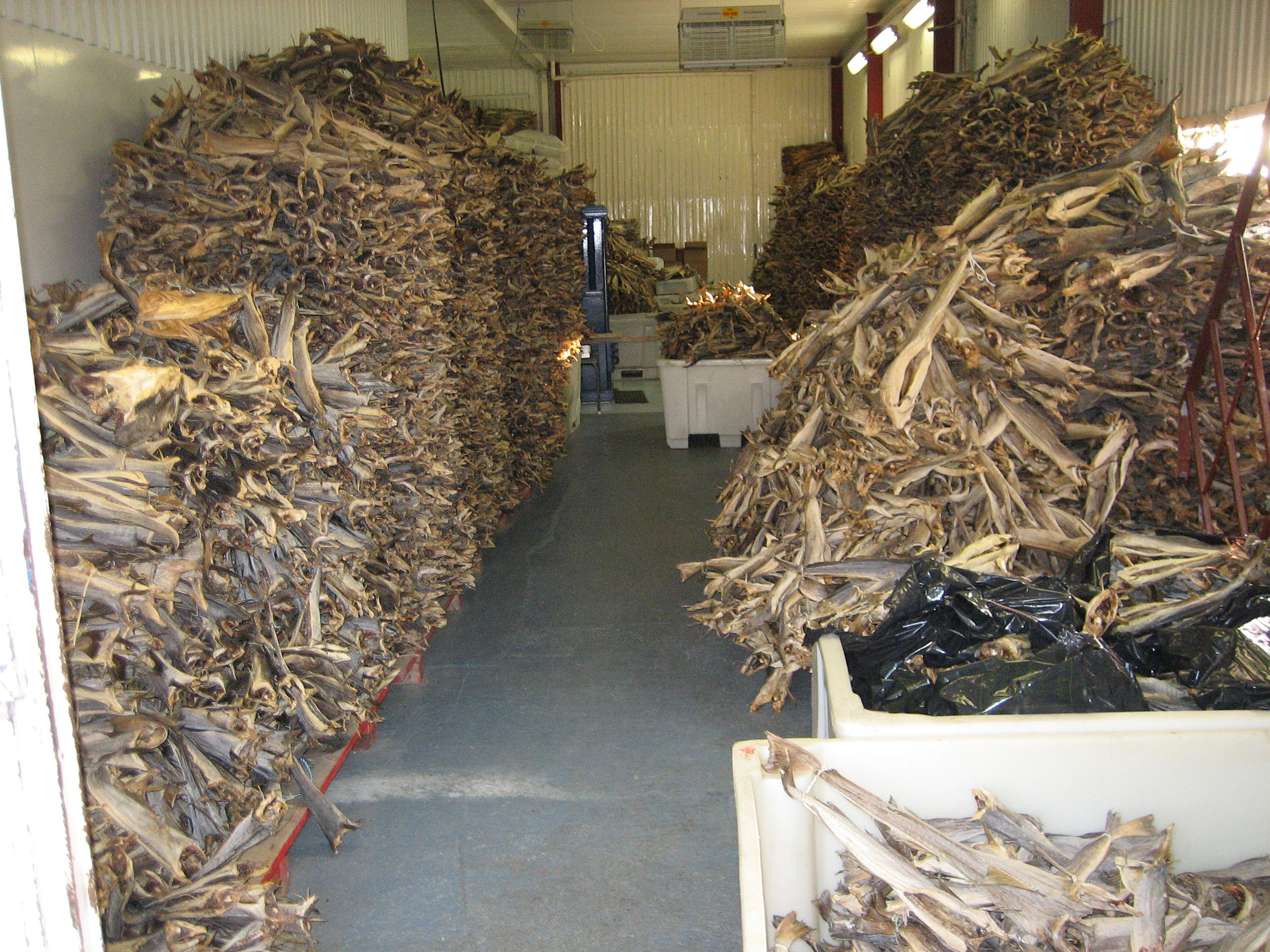
Stockfish warehouse in the village of Forsøl, Norway

The word stockfish is a loan word from West Frisian stokfisk (stick fish), possibly referring to the wooden racks on which stockfish are traditionally dried or because the dried fish resembles a stick. "Stock" may also refer to a wooden yoke or harness on a horse or mule, once used to carry large fish from the sea or after drying/smoking for trade in nearby villages.

== Importance ==
Stockfish is Norway's longest sustained export commodity. Stockfish is first mentioned as a commodity in the 13th-century Icelandic prose work Egil's Saga, where chieftain Thorolf Kveldulfsson, in the year 875 AD, ships stockfish from Helgeland in mid-Norway to Britain. This product accounted for most of Norway's trade income from the Viking Age throughout the Medieval period. Stockfish was essential as food for the viking expeditions and raids in faraway countries.

Preserved cod fed Iceland for centuries, to the extent that it has been described as a local equivalent of bread.

Stockfish is extremely popular and is widely consumed in Catholic Mediterranean countries, mostly in Italy. (Stockfish is called stoccafisso in most Italian dialects, but confusingly baccalà—which normally refers to salt cod—in the Veneto). In Russian cuisine dried stockfish is a very popular dish which is often eaten with vodka and beer. In the 16th century Russian and Swedish stockfish were sold to many European countries.

== Manufacturing and usage ==
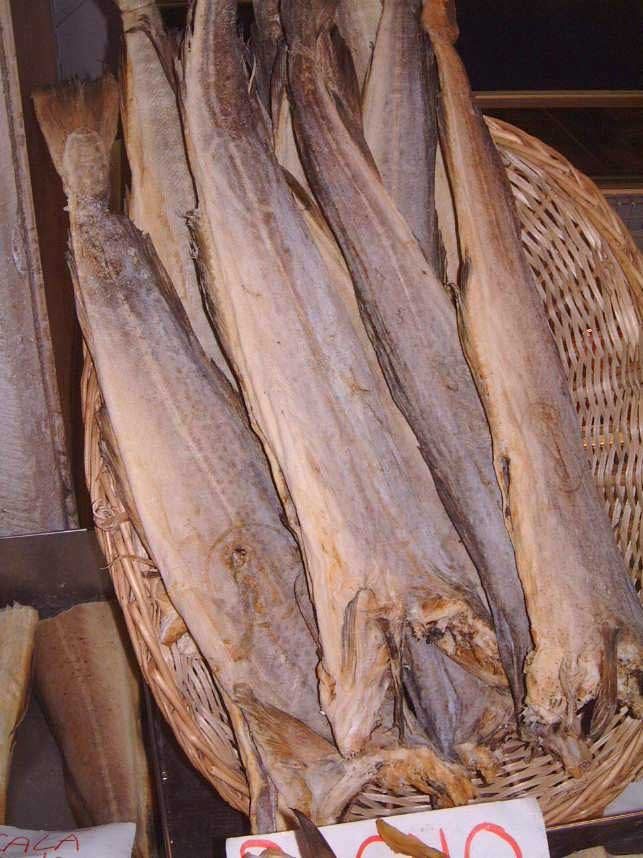
Stockfish from cod in Venice, Italy

The fish is prepared immediately after capture. After gutting the fish, it is either dried whole, or split along the spine leaving the tail connected. The fish is hung on the hjell from February to May. Stable cool weather protects the fish from insects and prevents an uncontrolled bacterial growth. A temperature just above zero degrees Celsius, with little rain, is ideal. Too much frost will spoil the fish, as ice destroys the fibers in the fish. The climate in northern Norway is excellent for stockfish production, and remains so even with changing climate conditions. Salted/dried whitefish (klippfisk) was more common in the fisheries districts of Western Norway. Further south in Norway, the cod was salted in barrells from the 15th century.

After its three months hanging on the hjell, the fish is then matured for another two to three months indoors in a dry and airy environment. During the drying, about 80% of the water in the fish evaporates. The stockfish retains much of the nutrients from the fresh fish, only concentrated: it is therefore rich in proteins, vitamins, iron, and calcium.

Most of the Norwegian dried cod is exported to Portugal ($244M), Sweden ($76M), Nigeria ($30.5M), Brazil ($29.1M), and Italy ($23.2M). In Norway and Iceland, the stockfish is mostly used as a snack and for lutefisk production. In Italy, the fish (called stoccafisso) is soaked and used in various courses, and is viewed as a delicacy. It was popularized in Nigeria following its delivery as food aid during the Nigerian Civil War in the late 1960s.

Low-quality stockfish is also commonly used as supplemental food for pets, primarily as dog food or dog treats.

The 2012–2015 project SafeTrackFood developed a method of indoor production of stockfish to accelerate the maturing and drying of the fish in a safe manner.

== Dishes ==
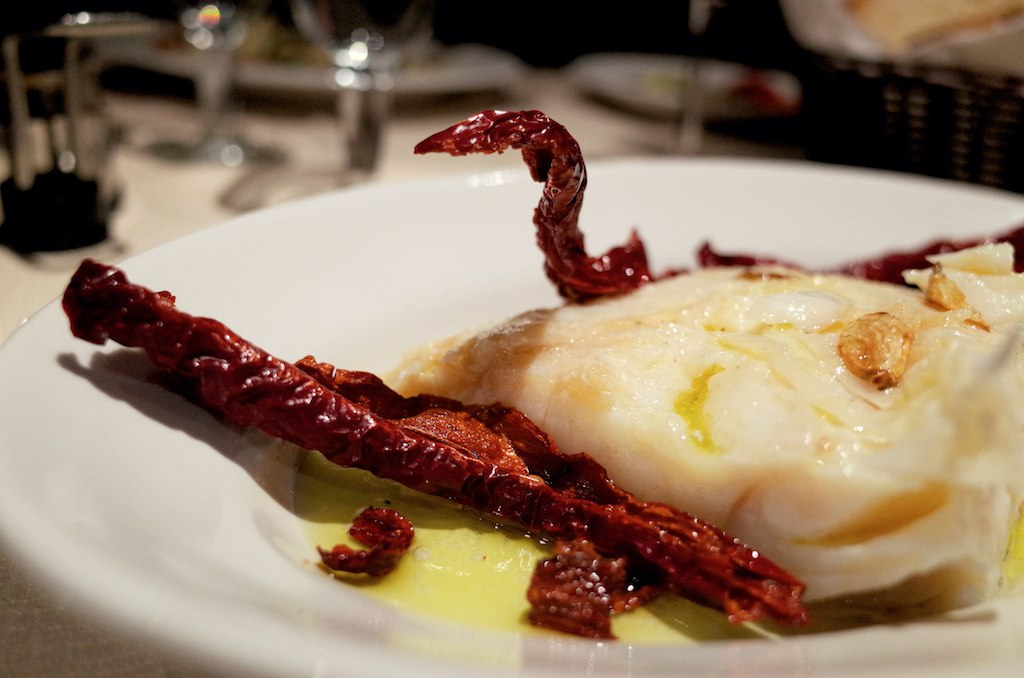
Baccalà alla lucana: traditional recipe from Basilicata

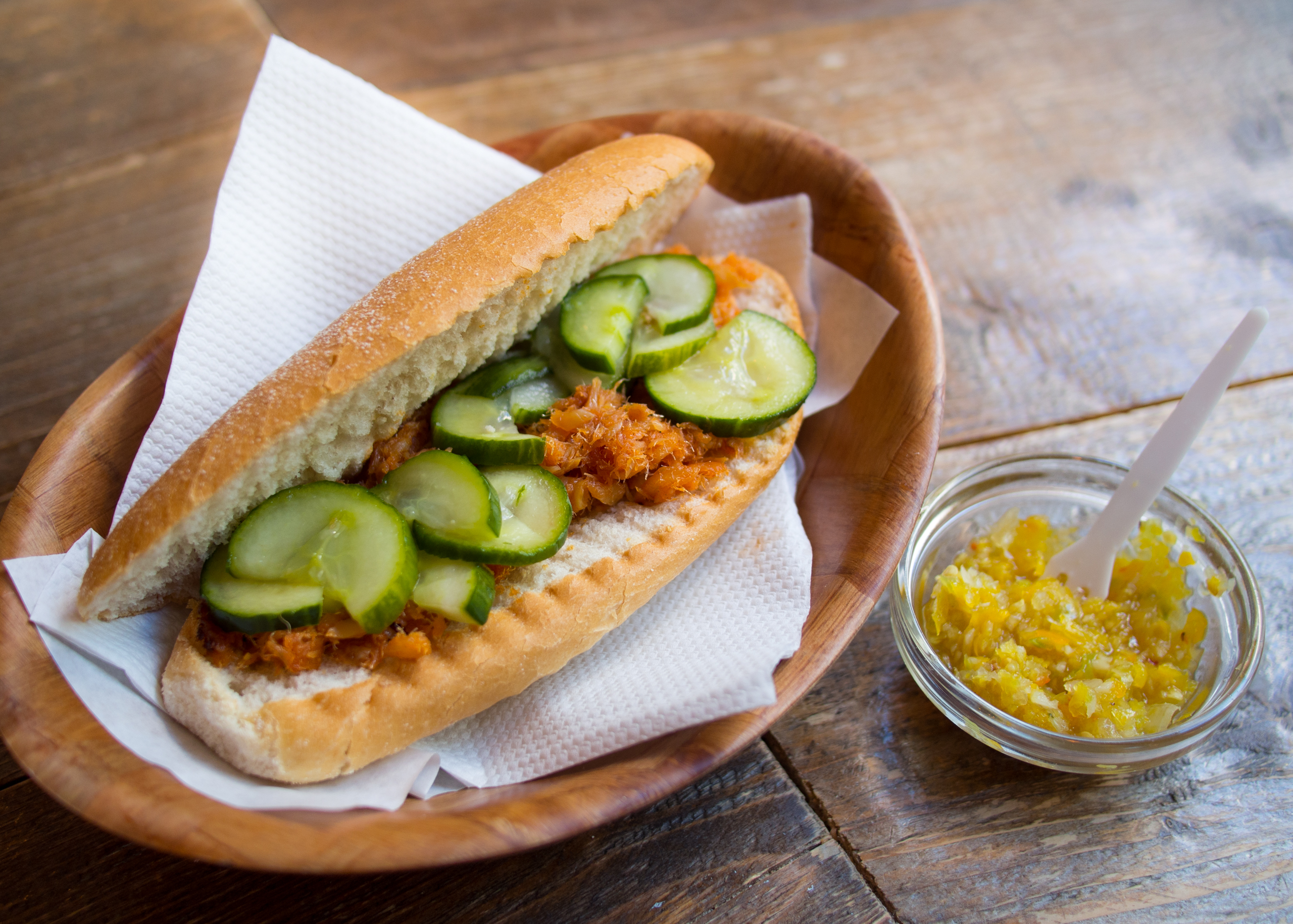
A Dutch-Surinamese "broodje bakkeljauw" in the Netherlands (a bun with sliced cucumbers and shredded and spiced stockfish)

Baccalà alla vicentina, an ancient and traditional Italian dish native to Vicenza, is made from stockfish (confusingly not from dried and salted cod, although the salted form is known in standard Italian as baccalà), and is served on or next to polenta. In the Italian region of Basilicata, the so-called baccalà alla lucana is prepared with typical peppers called "cruschi" (dialect word for "crispy"). In Calabria, stockfish is widely used, especially in the western side of the region: pasta with stockfish is a staple in Christmas Eve.

Dishes made from stockfish (locally called bakalar) are traditionally eaten on Christmas Eve in Croatia, especially Dalmatia.

In Catalonia, stockfish is an ingredient of a kind of surf and turf named es niu.

Stockfish is popular in West Africa, especially in Nigeria, where it serves as a flavor and fish in the many soups like egusi, edikaikong, ofe nsala, afang, ukazi, oha, efo riro, okra, etc., that are eaten with fufu meals, such as pounded yam, fufu, and garri meals. It is the main ingredient in the Nigerian delicacy called "ugba na okporoko" or "ukazi" amongst the Igbo, Ibibio, Efik, Annang, Kalabari, Igbani, Ikwerre, etc., peoples of southeastern Nigeria. Most importers of "okporoko" are based in the town of Aba in Abia State. Among the Nri, Aro, Nkwerre, and Umuahia peoples, at festive periods, a popular meal is ukazi soup which is usually well-garnished with okporoko or cod as it is popularly called. The Kwe people, who are a fishing people of the English-speaking part of Cameroon, use stockfish in flavoring their palm nut or banga, which can be eaten with a cocoyam pudding called kwacoco. The name okporoko for stockfish, among the Igbo of Nigeria refers to the sound the hard fish makes in the pot and literally translates as "that which produces sound in the pot".

Both stockfish and salt cod can be made into lutefisk.

== Gallery ==
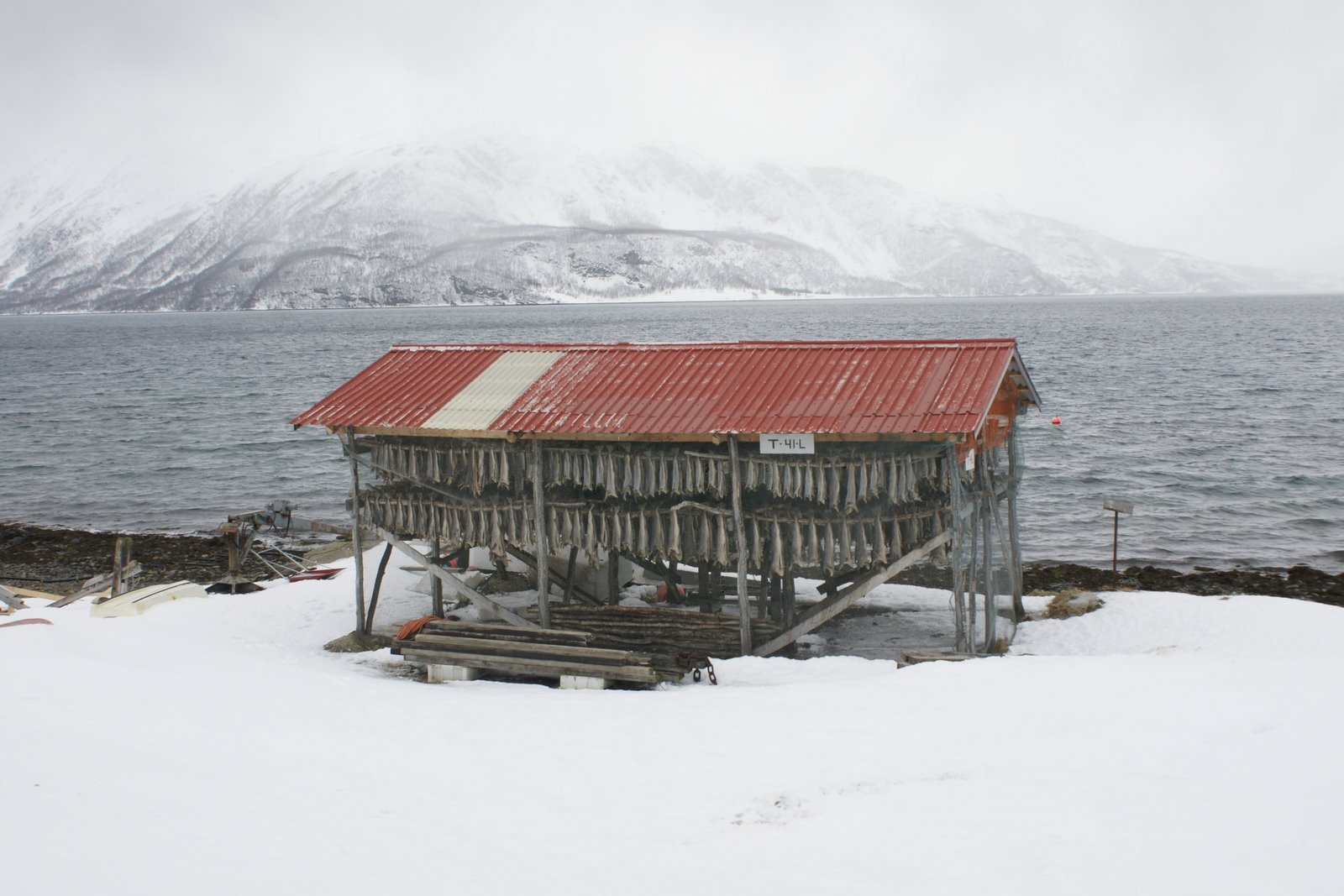
Cod hung for drying in Lyngen fjord, Norway

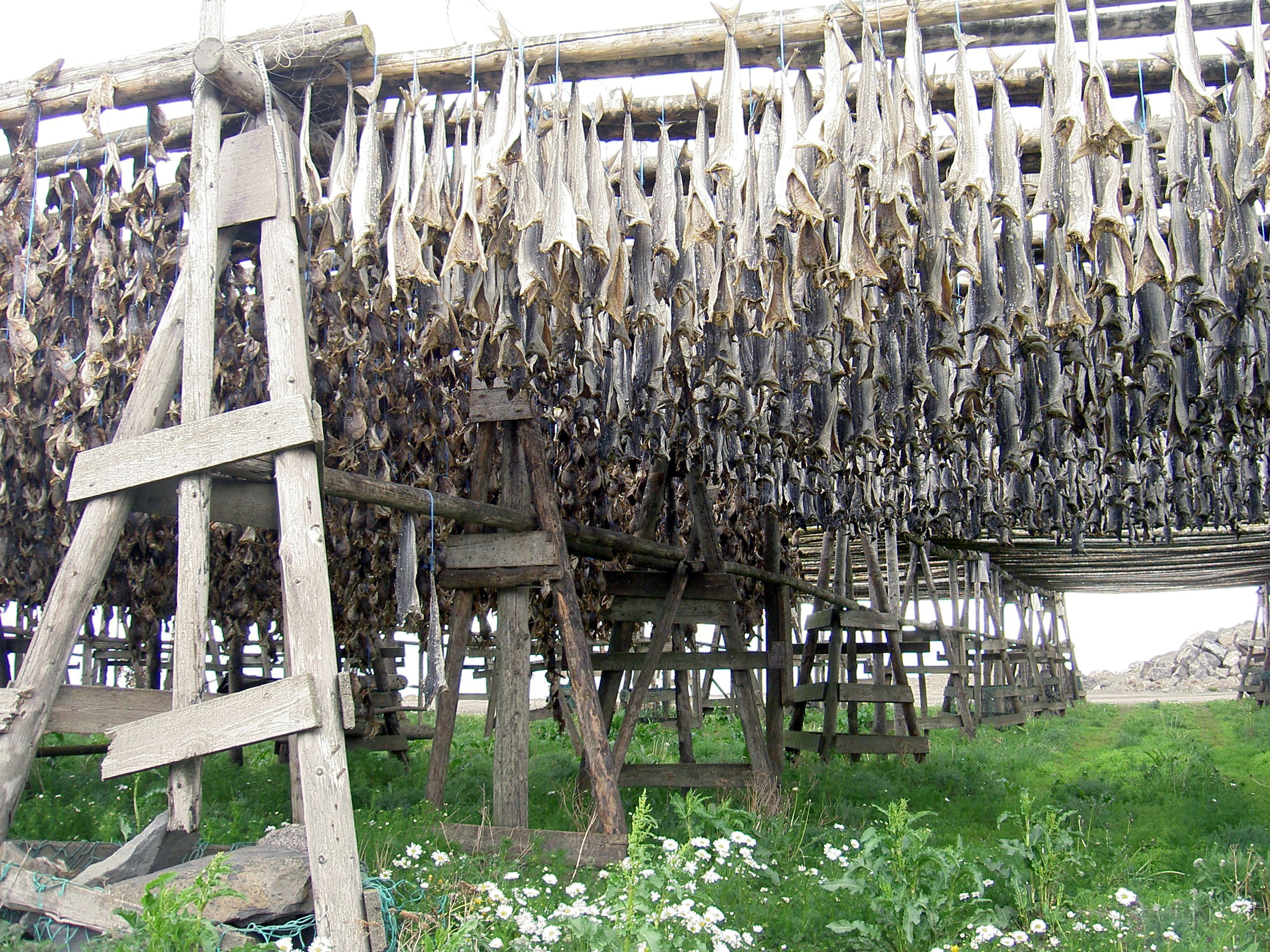
Stockfish up for drying in Iceland

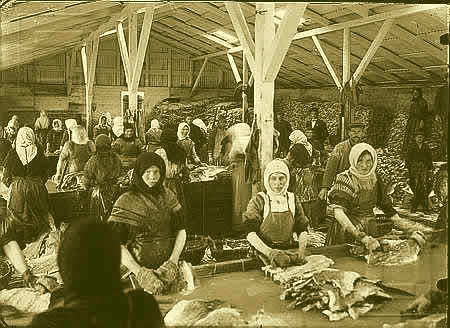
Women working with stock fish in Iceland c. 1915

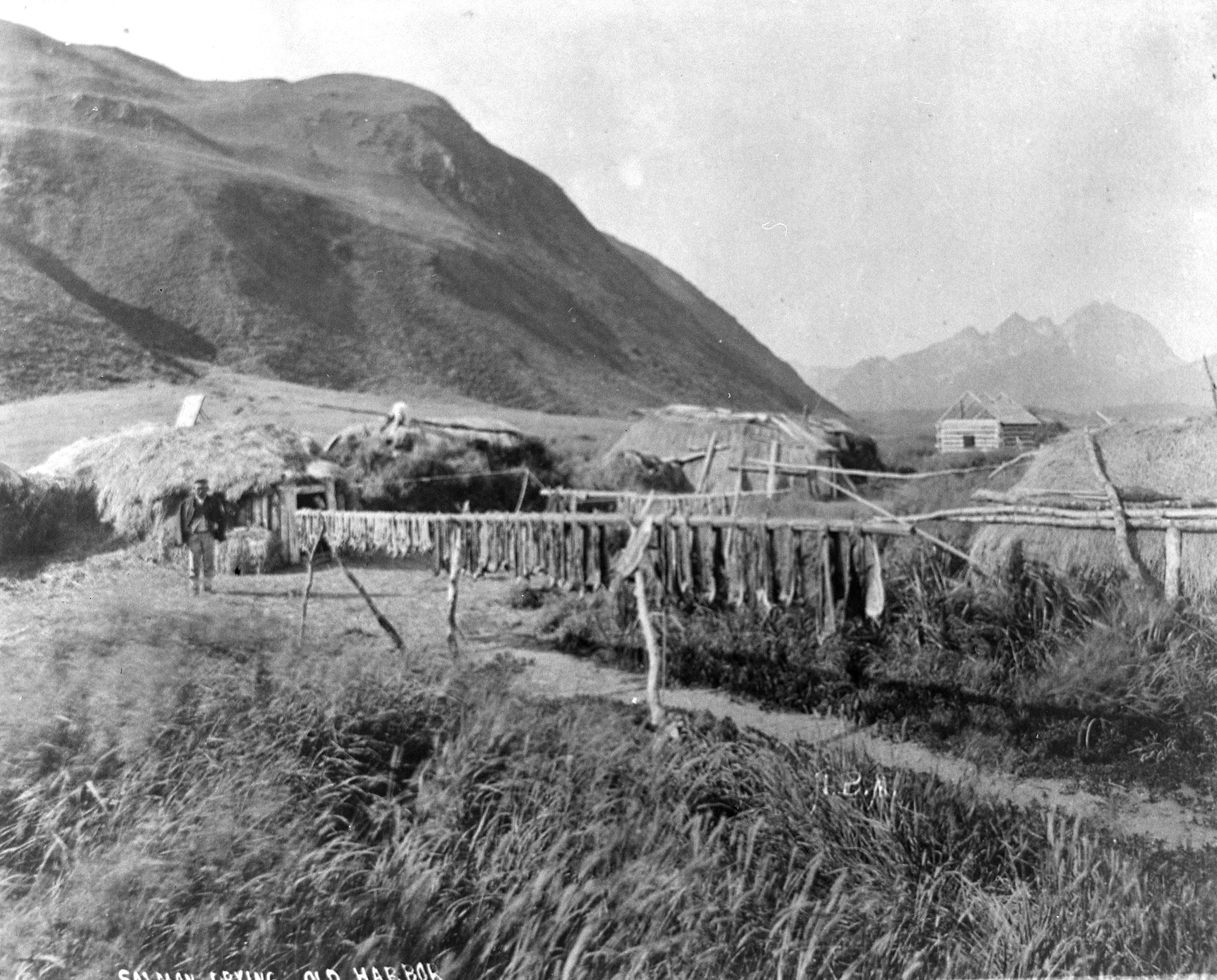
Indian village showing native method of drying salmon, c. 1888.

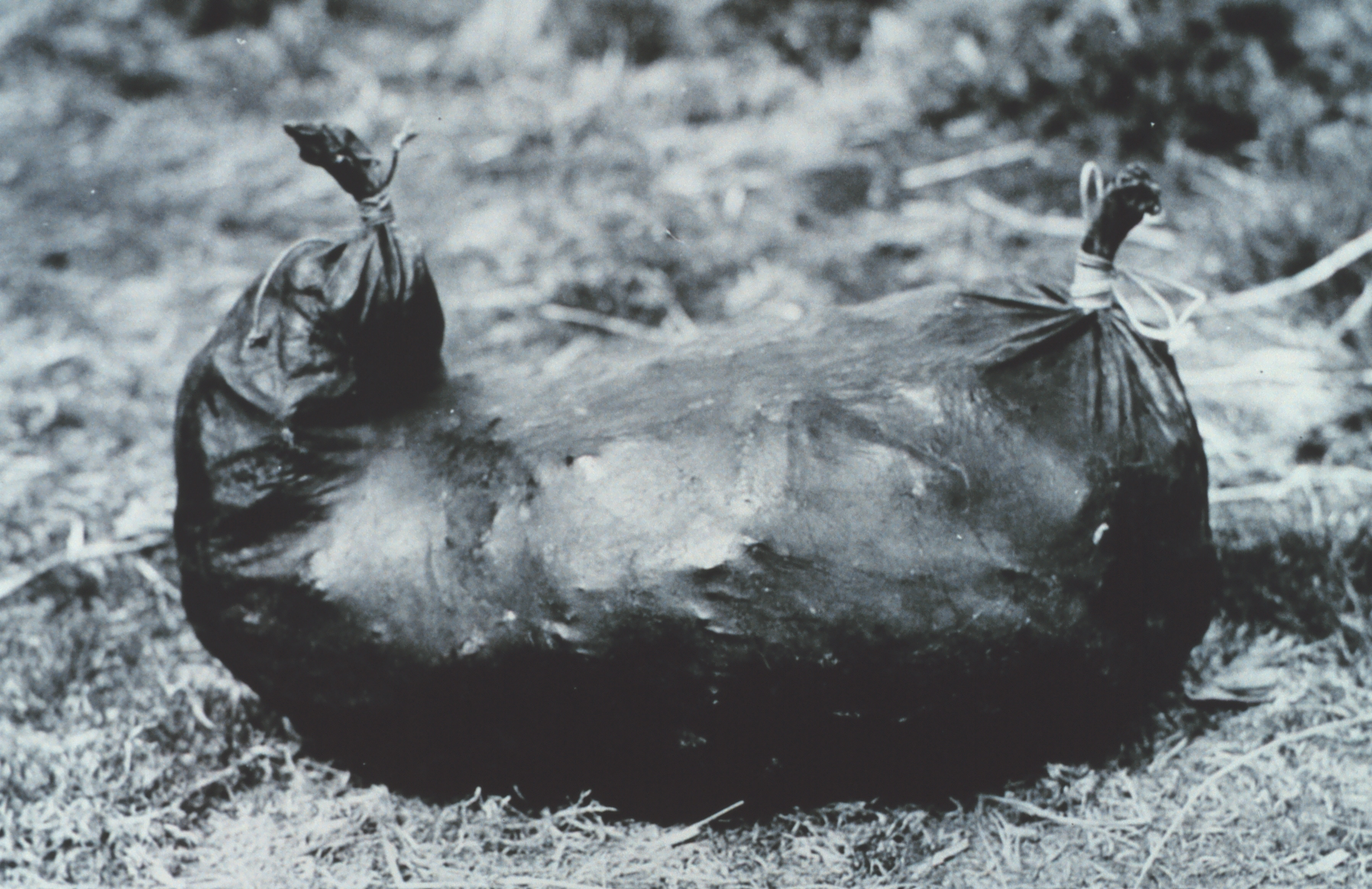
Stomach of a sea lion used by Aleut natives to store dried red salmon

The coat of arms of Iceland under Dano-Norwegian rule, blazoned "Gules, a stockfish argent crowned Or", c. 16th century–1903

== See also ==
- Boknafisk
- Bugeo – similarly dried Alaska pollock
- List of dried foods
- Lofoten Stockfish Museum
- Yukola, similar fish drying in Russian Far East and Eastern Siberia

== Sources ==
- Inderhaug, T. "Stockfish Production, Cultural and Culinary Values". Food Ethics 5, 6 (2020). https://doi.org/10.1007/s41055-019-00060-6
- Kurlansky, Mark (1997). Cod: A Biography of the Fish That Changed the World. New York: Walker. ISBN 0-8027-1326-2.
- Riddervold, A. (1984). Lutefisk, Rakefisk and Herring in Norwegian Tradition. Oslo: Novus Press.
