= Ukazi soup =

Igbo soup

- Alternative names: Okazi soup, Ofe Okazi
- Region or state: Nigeria
- Created by: Igbo people
- Main ingredients: Okazi and water leaves
- Similar dishes: Afang soup

Ukazi or Okazi (wild spinach) soup is an Igbo soup. The soup is made majorly from two leaves: okazi and water leaf.

Some ingredients used in making the soup include palm oil, egusi balls (mgbam), crayfish and seasoning cubes. Okazi soup can be eaten with swallows such as eba, Semo and pounded yam. Ofe Okazi is similar to Ofe Owerri, but unlike the latter, which is thickened with cocoyam, Ofe Okazi is thickened with achi, ofor, or ukpo, giving it a distinct texture and flavor.

== Ingredients ==
Some ingredients:

- Achi, Ofor Or Ukpo(Egusi melon seeds can be used as a substitute)
- Beef or assorted meat
- Smoked fish
- Stock fish (optional)
- Shelled Periwinkle(optional)
- Ground crayfish
- Fresh pepper or ground dried pepper
- Water leaves(optional)
- Afang Leaves(okazi/ukazi leaves)
- Palm oil

== Health benefits ==
In 100g of dried Afang leaves, there are approximately 44g of carbohydrates, 12.8g of protein, 37.8g of fiber, and 2.4g of fat. Afang leaves are also rich in minerals such as calcium, iron, zinc, and potassium. These nutrients support bone and teeth development and may also help in managing blood pressure.

Afang leaves are also traditionally associated with other health benefits, including use in managing conditions such as enlarged spleen, sore throat, and piles. They may also be used in supporting blood sugar control in diabetes management.

However, despite these benefits, afang leaves may have potential adverse effects. They have been noted to contain compounds that could exert cyanotoxic effects and may also suppress the haemopoietic system, which is responsible for blood cell production.

== See also ==
- Nigerian cuisine
- Ubakala
- Gnetum africanum
- OnGACIOUS
