= Miyar zogale =

Hausa soup

Miyar Zogale is an Hausa dish also known as moringa soup. Zogale refers to the leaves of the plant moringa oleifera. It is made with moringa leaf as the main ingredient, others include groundnut paste, grounded tomato, beef, cubes, daddawa and palm oil.

Groundnut paste is to thicken the soup and daddawa (locust beans) is added for taste.

== Overview ==
Beef and moringa leaf is parboiled in a separate pot. Palm is poured into a pot with grounded tomato, daddawa, seasoning cubes and salt stirred for a few minutes, groundnut paste is added gradually to thickened the soup. When the oil float to the top of the soup, the parboiled moringa leaf is added .

== Ingredients ==
- Fresh zogale (moringa) leaves
- Groundnut paste (peanut paste)
- Meat or fish (optional)
- Pepper
- Seasoning cubes
- Salt
- locust beans (optional)
- Groundnut oil or palm oil (optional)
- Onion
- Water
- Crayfish (optional)

== Other foods ==
Miyar zogale goes well with biskin masara, wheat, semovita, pounded yam and tuwo shinkafa.

== See also ==
- onGACIOUS
- Hausa cuisine
