= Balyk =

Salted and dried soft parts of fish

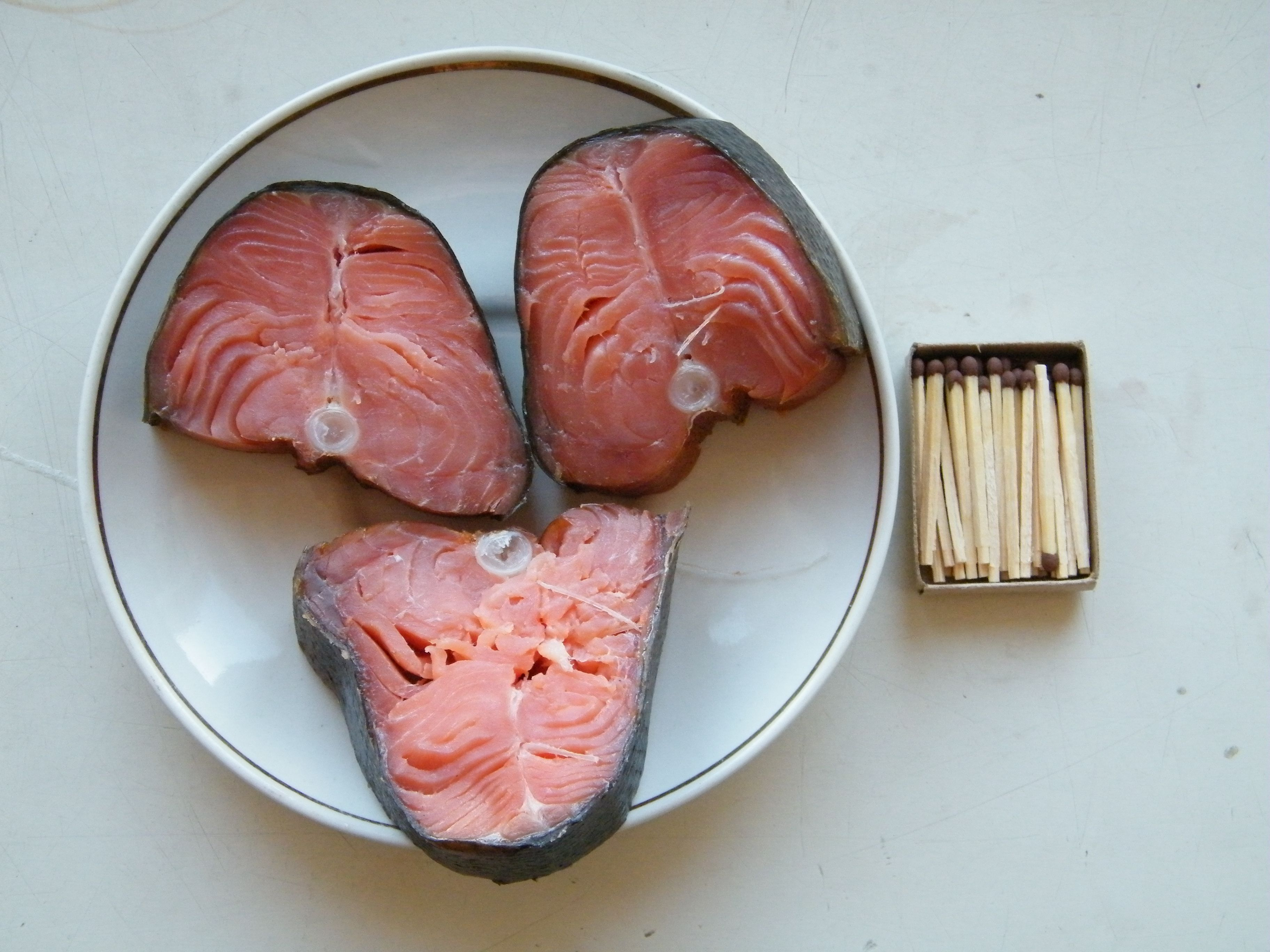
- Balyk made from salmon
- Type: Smoked fish
- Main ingredients: Fish, may vary

Balyk (from Turkic balïq) is a dish made from the salted and dried soft parts of fish, usually coming from large valuable species: acipenseridae (e.g., sturgeon) or salmonidae (salmon). The word means "fish" in Turkic languages (written balık in Turkish).

== History ==
Over time, the term was applied to smoked fish of this kind, and one may see, e.g., "cold smoked hucho balyk." As a curiosity, a number of cold smoked pork products branded "balyk" appeared in the USSR, remaining popular in the post-Soviet republics. Traditionally, sturgeon balyk has been considered the most fine and tender one, sought and praised by gourmets. At the same time, the tender flesh of sturgeon is more susceptible to growth of Clostridium botulinum bacteria.

== See also ==
- List of dried foods
