= Tenants of the House =

2019 Nigerian film

- Directed by: Kunle Afolayan
- Screenplay by: Tunde Babalola
- Produced by: Wale Okediran
- Release date: 2019
- Country: Nigeria
- Language: English

Tenants of the House is a 2019 Nigerian film written by Tunde Babalola, produced by Wale Okediran and directed by Kunle Afolayan. It was sponsored by the Ford Foundation, Premero Consulting Ltd, the Bank of Industry, and the National Livestock Transformation Plan. The film is based on Wale Okediran's fictional novel written in 2009 and mainly focuses on political conspiracies, girl-child education and betrayal. The cast includes Yakubu Mohammed, Joselyn Dumas, Dele Odule, Saeed Funkymallam, Chris Iheuwa and Umar Gombe.

== Plot ==
A selfless politician and congressman in the lower chamber of the National Assembly seeks to use his position to resolve the longstanding conflict between Fulani herdsmen and Hausa farmers. He singlehandedly sponsored a bill aimed at eradicating the vendetta, but faced various challenges from corrupt congressmen who were indifferent to the conflict.

== Cast ==
- Kunle Afolayan as politician
- Ahmed Abdulrasheed as assassin
- Jadesola Abolanle as housemaid
- Idris Abubakar as young Samuel
- Adam Adeniyi as caterer
- Adeniran Adeyemi as Arese's driver
- Sanni O. Amina as Hon. Four
- Olusesan Atolagbe as Hon. Three
- Ganiu Baba as Alhaji Megida
- Dasu Babalola as pot belly man
- Issa Bello as Batejo's father
- Adeniyi Dare as henchman
- Joselyn Dumas as Hon. Elizabeth
- Kent Edunjobi as party band leader

== Premiere ==
The film premiered on 25 June 2021 at the Sheraton Hotel in Abuja and was also screened nationwide.
