= Kvalfjorden =

Fjord in Finnmark, Norway

Kvalfjorden (Norwegian); Fállevuotna (Northern Sami)
- Interactive map of the fjord
- Coordinates: 70.7077°N 23.81699°E
- Type: Fjord
- Basin countries: Norway
- Max. length: 3.5 kilometres (2.2 mi)
- Max. depth: 88 metres (289 ft)

Kvalfjorden (Norwegian) or Fállevuotna (Northern Sami) is a fjord in Hammerfest Municipality in Finnmark county, Norway. The 3.5-kilometre (2.2 mi) long fjord is located on the northeast side of the island of Kvaløya.

== Details ==
Although Kvalfjorden is in the Arctic, the warming effects of the Gulf Stream warm the area. The fjord is between Brattneset in the north and Kvalfjordneset in the south and stretches 3.5 kilometres (2.2 mi) southwest. The village of Forsøl lies just to the north of the fjord.

At the heart of the fjord, it divides into the two bays Vesterbotn and Pollen. Both of these have individual houses built along the shorelines. The fjord is 88 metres (289 ft) at its deepest point, just west of Kvalfjordneset.

County Road 8124 (Norwegian: Fylkesvei 8124) runs along parts of the fjord on the west side.

== Climate ==
Vesterbotn experiences a varied climate, with notable temperature differences throughout the year and occasional strong winds. From April 2022 to April 2023, the highest temperature reached 29.1 °C (84.4 °F) on 26 July. On the other hand, the lowest temperature recorded was −14.4 °C (6.1 °F) on 9 March. The region also experiences strong winds, with the highest wind speed recorded at 17.7 metres per second (58 ft/s) on 10 August and the strongest gust reaching 26.9 metres per second (88 ft/s) on 11 November.
