= Forsøl =

- Village
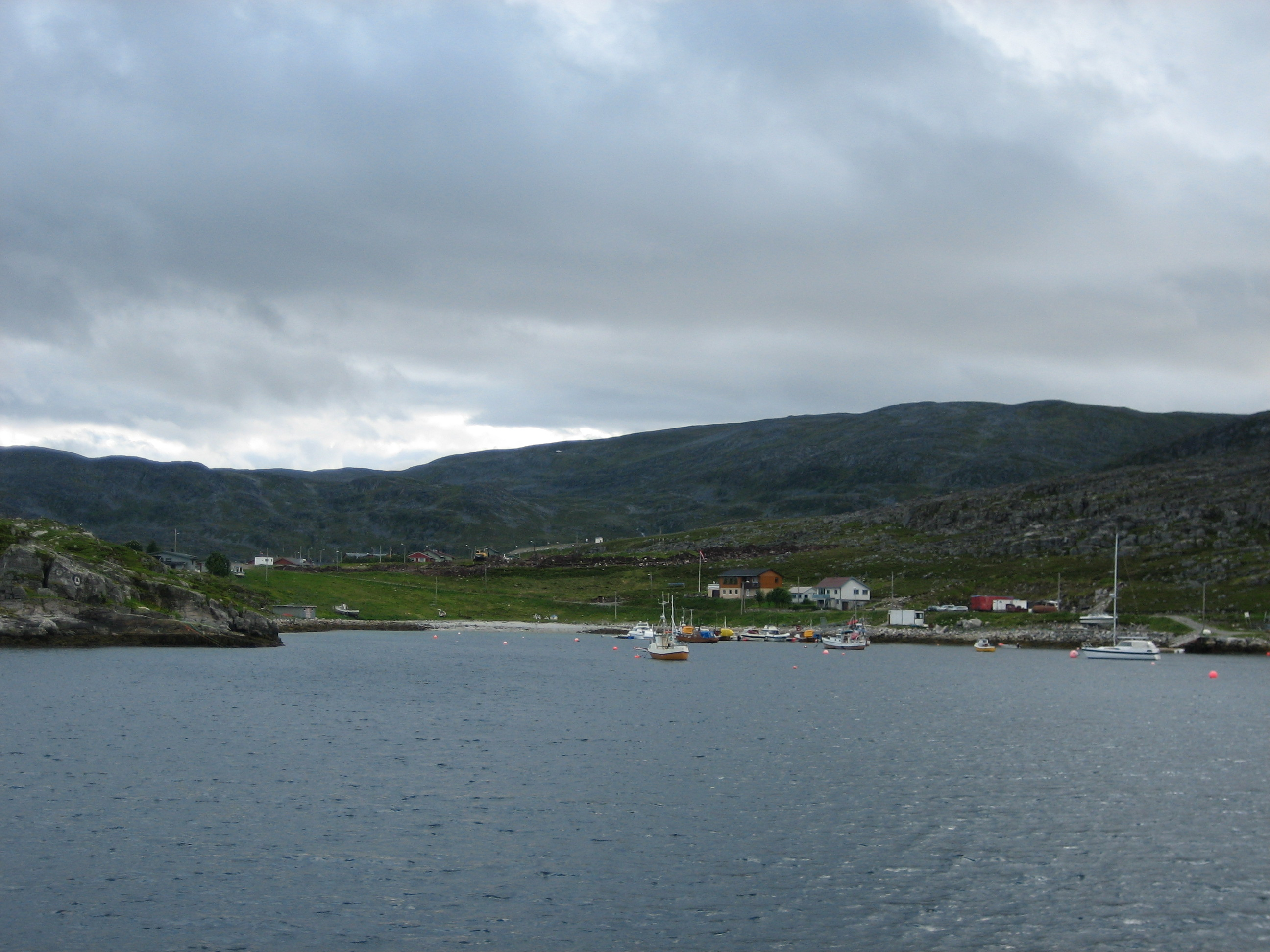
- View of the village
- Interactive map of Forsøl
- Location within Finnmark Location within Norway
- Coordinates: 70°43′18″N 23°48′22″E
- Country: Norway
- Region: Northern Norway
- County: Finnmark
- District: Vest-Finnmark
- Municipality: Hammerfest

Area
  - Total: 0.14 km^{2} (0.054 sq mi)
- Elevation: 14 m (46 ft)

Population (2020)
  - Total: 202
  - Density: 1,443/km^{2} (3,740/sq mi)
- Time zone: UTC+01:00 (CET)
  - Summer (DST): UTC+02:00 (CEST)
- Post Code: 9600 Hammerfest

Forsøl is a fishing village in Hammerfest Municipality in Finnmark county, Norway. It is located on the northeastern coast of the island of Kvaløya, about 8 kilometres (5.0 mi) northeast of the town of Hammerfest. The Kvalfjorden is a small fjord located just south of the village.

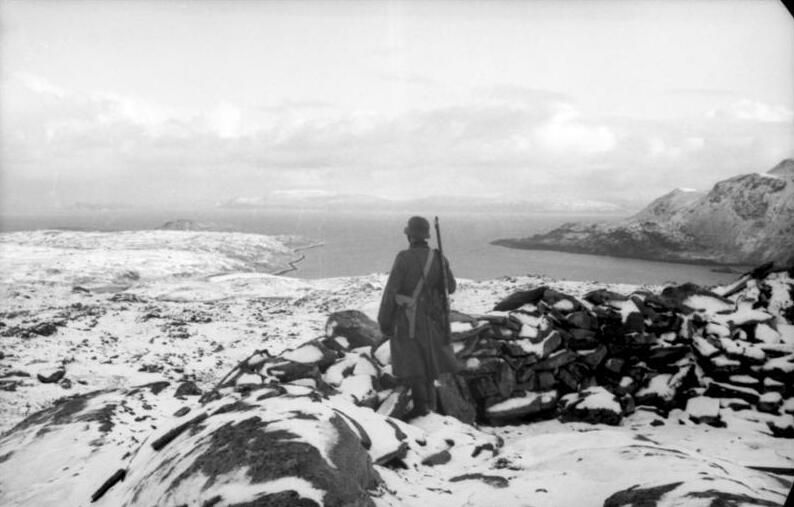
German observation post in the hills overlooking Forsøl during the Second World War

The 0.14-square-kilometre (35-acre) village had a population (2020) of 202 and a population density of 1,443 inhabitants per square kilometre (3,740/sq mi). Since 2020, the population and area data for this village area has not been separately tracked by Statistics Norway.

== See also ==
- List of villages in Finnmark
