= Boknafisk =

Variant of stockfish

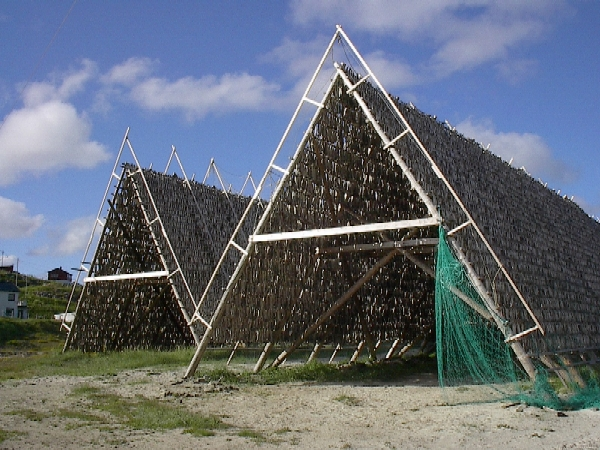
Boknafisk drying on hjells in Norway

Boknafisk (either from saami boahkkeguolli or Norwegian bokna "half dry") is a variant of stockfish and is unsalted fish partially dried by sun and wind on drying flakes ('hjell') or on a wall.

Boknafisk is hung out to dry in the winter months. The fish is most often unsalted, but in some places salted fish is also used. The hanging time varies according to dryness and taste/pleasantness, usually a few days or around 1-2 weeks, until it is quite dry on the outside, but still soft and slightly sour inside. It should still be soft at the backbone.

The most common fish used for boknafisk is cod, but other types of fish can also be used. If herring is used, the dish is called boknasild.

"Boknafesk" is a delicacy in Northern Norway, and is often served with fried bacon, green pea stew, dip and boiled potatoes. "Dopp" (also called "duppe" elsewhere in the country) is an unseasoned thick white sauce made from margarine, flour and milk. Boknafisk is also served with sour soup (from water, barley flour, salt and something sour) or milk soup.

Boknafisk is mostly associated with Northern Norway, but it is eaten along the entire Norwegian coast down to Bergen.

== See also ==
- List of dried foods
