= Fish flake =

Outdoor platform for drying cod in northern fishing villages

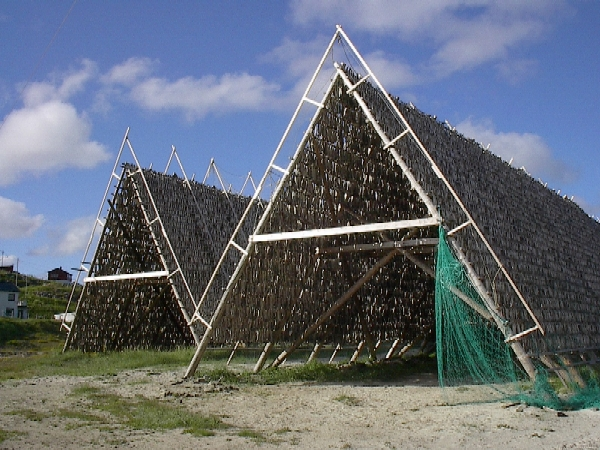
A fish flake, such as this one in Norway, is a rack used for drying cod

A fish flake is a platform built on poles and spread with boughs for drying cod on the foreshores of fishing villages and small coastal towns in Newfoundland and Nordic countries. Spelling variations for fish flake in Newfoundland include flek, fleyke, fleake, flaik and fleack. The term's first recorded use in connection with fishing appeared in Richard Whitbourne's book Newfoundland (1623, p. 57). In Norway, a flake is known as a hjell.

== Construction ==
The flake consists of a horizontal framework of small poles (called lungers), sometimes covered with spruce boughs, and supported by upright poles, the air having free access beneath. Here the cod are spread out to bleach in the sun and air after the fish has been curing all summer in stages under a heavy spreading of salt. There are two types of common known flakes during the height of the fishing season: one a permanent structure as described above, and the other, called a hand flake, that can be erected on short notice and provides for more area in the event that a fishing season is rather bountiful.

=== Flake and fish store ===
The fish flake was a permanent structure that was part of the landscape of a fishing village. These were located not far from the fishing stages that were built on the shoreline. The flake was built high off the ground and required stable construction with a sloping ramp to gain access to it. The ramp was required such that fishermen carrying a full load of fish on barrows were able to negotiate its ascent. At one end of the flake was built a building that served dual purposes. The construction of the building, called a fish store, was of two story construction and had to be large enough to accommodate a season's voyage of fish on the top level. In the lower section of the fish store was kept the gear that was used for fishing: buoys, ropes, killicks, grapples, and other miscellany.

The top level of the store was of an open structure with areas that could be sectioned off to contain neat stacks of dried fish. As the drying process depended on the weather, dry fish spent up to two months in this facility. At the start of the drying season, usually mid-August to early September, the fish would be carried to the flakes and spread out for drying.

=== Hand flake ===
The hand flake was built and utilized only when the amount of fish caught during a season called for it; as such these were considered temporary structures. Hand flakes were built low to the ground at about waist height with the surface area about the width of a person's reach stretched in various lengths. These were placed in very tight rows to maximize available drying area. These were conveniently located next to, or close by, the main flake for quick storage of the fish whenever the weather was inclement. It was very vital that the fish be kept dry during the curing process to prevent rot and most importantly to prevent fly spits that would lead to maggots. Any of these occurrences could ruin a harvest.

== History ==
Captain George Cartwright had noted the use of flakes in his journal in the 1770s and in common use at that time. The journal of James Younge depicted a sketch of a flake c. 1663; and the illustration from Moll's map (c. 1712) shows little difference in the basic design of the flake.

These structures took on a very distinct appearance within a fishing village, so much so that in his book Voyage to Newfoundland and the Southern Coast of Labrador, Edward Chappell (1818, pp. 44–45) gives a description of the flakes of St. John's not long before the great fire that destroyed most of St. John's:

On first entering the bays and ports of Newfoundland, the attention of a stranger is mostly attracted by the remarkable appearance exhibited by the innumerable stages erected along the sea-shore for the salting and drying of cod. The shores around the harbour of St. John's are entirely covered with them, and their construction is particularly simple. Numerous supporters, exactly resembling "Kentish" hop-poles, are first fixed in the ground: over these is placed a horizontal platform of similar poles; and the whole is finally overspread with a covering of dry fern. This sort of structure is called, by the fishermen, a Fish Flake: but there are other stages, erected in a similar manner, although standing partly in the water, with a hut at their extremity, for the reception and salting of cod, previous to its final removal to the "Flakes", for the purpose of being dried in the sun.

Flakes were used well into the twentieth century, but the demand for dried fish lessened as cold storage and freezer units came into use. However, in the mid 1980s flakes were still being used in smaller outport communities to dry fish for family use and local sale of dried salt-cod.

== Fish drying process ==
Prior to the widespread use of freezer technology, the Newfoundland fishery was dependent on salt as a preservative and curing agent. This process was necessitated because it was unfeasible for vessels to take their catch back to Europe on every trip to the fishing grounds on the Grand Banks of Newfoundland.

Certainly to obtain the best price for the fish caught during the fishing season the quality of the fish was of prime importance and care was taken to ensure a profitable catch. When the fish was taken from the saltbulk it was then washed of excess salt and film that had formed during the curing process. The salted cod was then transported to the fish flakes by two men carrying a barrow. The fish was then spread out in a very neat and tidy order by placing them alternately heads and tails. These were first laid face-up, which is flesh side exposed to the sun. As the fish dried it was then flipped over to dry the back side of the salted cod. Before nightfall when the air became damp the fish was gathered up and placed in neat piles called faggots to minimize the exposed area of the fish. As the fish became dry enough for marketability, it was then stored in the fish store until most if not all of the season's harvest was dried in this fashion. The drying of fish may have taken up to a week to completely dry. The whole process of drying the complete season catch may have taken a month or two as space and manpower permitted.

== See also ==
- Fishing stage
- List of communities in Newfoundland and Labrador
