= Ongacious =

Nigerian food contest

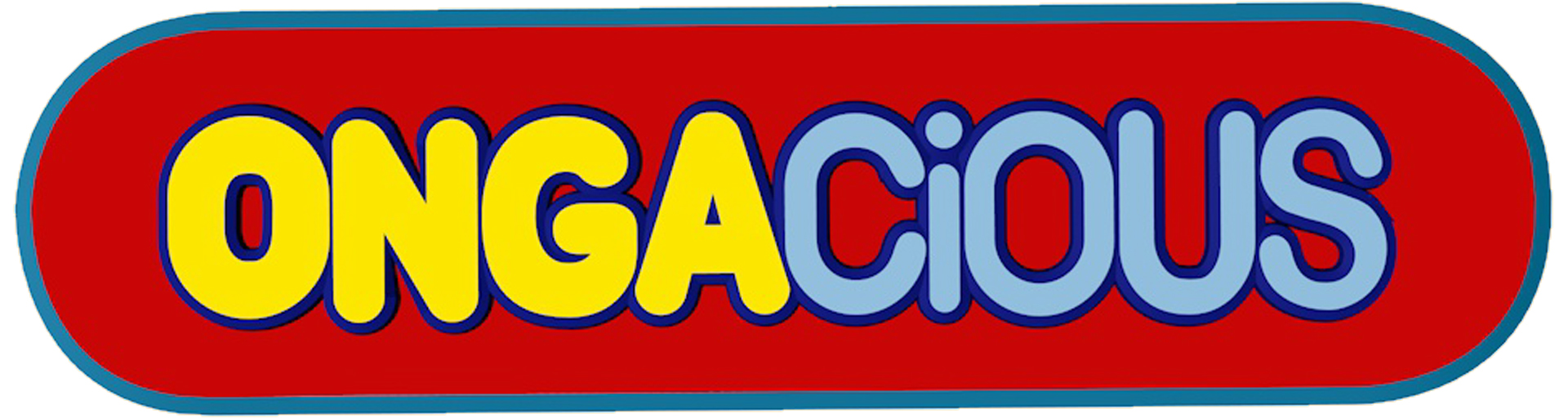
- Created by: Oladapo Ojo
- Based on: Health, Culinary and Lifestyle Show
- Developed by: JustMedia Productions (A subsidiary of DM Holdings Limited)
- Written by: Ogugua Dopamu
- Directed by: Oladapo Ojo
- Presented by: Ummi Baba-Ahmed, Folakemi Cole-Adeife
- Country of origin: Nigeria
- Original language: English
- No. of seasons: 2
- No. of episodes: 26

Production
- Executive producers: Abiodun Ayodeji, Oladapo Ojo
- Producers: Ogugua Dopamu, Funmi Oladapo-Ojo
- Editors: Joseph Onyia, Sam Oriabor, Bisola Akinwande, Jacob Abiiki, Austine Ogar
- Running time: 1 hour
- Production company: JustMedia Productions

Original release
- Release: 2018

Ongacious (stylized as ONGAcious) is predominantly a Nigerian family magazine show with a special culinary slant; studio production format (with sprinkling of location shoot).

The show is a weekly culinary magazine show, which is targeted at families. On each episode, there will be a mix of content that appeals to the whole family, from aerobics to wellness to family talk to meal of the day, to City in Focus documentary, music from the band and the studio audience.

The Hosts will coordinate the various segments on the show with refreshing music from the live band.

== Segments ==
=== Wellness (Pre-recorded) ===
The health benefits of regular exercise and physical activity are hard to ignore. Everyone benefits from exercise, regardless of age, gender or physical ability. Hence this segment takes viewers through scheduled routine of exercise (majorly dance routines) with the aim of reducing stress and achieving a healthier lifestyle.

=== Healthy living (Pre-recorded, but simulated as a Skype call) ===
Medical personnel from recognized institutions will be invited for a live chat on various medical conditions/issues and advise on the various healthy ways of preventing/managing these conditions. Topics could include diabetes, obesity in children, low blood pressure, etc.

=== Family Talk (Live on set) ===
A consultant is invited on the show based on specific topical family issues and expert analysis is done on these issues with advices/references given. Topics could range from relationships with in-laws, couple’s joint bank account, bullying, peer pressure etc.

=== City in Fokus (CIF) ===
Here, the guest cook and celebrity guest from the CIF are introduced. There is a conversation between the guest cook (who is a fan of the celebrity guest) and the hosts before the celebrity guest is introduced to the anxious guest cook and audience. There is meant to be a connection between the guest cook and the celebrity guest. The Docufeature is being played so as to create a familiar platform for the guest cook and celebrity guest.

- Guest Cook: From the CIF that has been profiled, the shortlisted candidates (based on recipe earlier supplied), who could be indigenous to that community, married, lived or schooled there, would then be invited on set to prepare the meal of the day.
- Celebrity Guest: The celebrity (actors, actresses, artists, sport personnel, photographers, models, blogger, fashion designers, makeup artists, TV personalities etc.) with a very strong relationship with the city in focus (indigenous to that community, married, lived or schooled there) is invited on the show to the surprise of the guest cook and studio audience, to add spice to the show.

=== Meal of the day ===
After having a few conversations with the hosts and guests, the guest cooks and celebrity guest proceeds into the kitchen to prepare the meal of the day. A local meal from the CIF is prepared in a healthy way using the different varieties of Onga seasonings for the celebrity guests to savour. Music is dished out by the live band to the enjoyment of the guest and audience seated.

The show ends with the Approval of the meal by the Celebrity and the Host signs off the show, with the band playing music while they continue to enjoy their meal.

== Season 1 ==
The first season of Ongacious kicked off on Saturday 7 April 2018, and is shown on several stations across Nigeria including DSTV, African Magic, TVC, AIT and others. In the first season of the show we visited 26 cities touching all the zones in Nigeria.

EP	STATE	CITY	ZONE	CELEBRITIES	MEAL OF THE DAY
1	Delta	Asaba	South South	Cassandra Odita	Ofe Nsala and Pounded Yam
2	Bauchi	Bauchi	North East	Paul Sambo	Miyar Kuka and Tuwo Masara
3	Ogun	Ijebu Ode	South West	Idowu Philips (Iya Rainbow)	Ikokore and Eba
4	Ondo	Owo	South West	Akin Adelegun	Koowo with Pounded Yam
5	Cross River	Calabar	South South	Patrick Doyle	Ekpang Nkwukwo
6	Kaduna	Kaduna	North West	Sani Idris Kauru	Miyar Zogale and Tuwo Shinkafa
7	Port Harcourt	Ikwere	South South	Julius Agwu	Okazi Soup with Eba
8	Katsina	Funtua	North West	Baban Chinedu	Dambu Shinkafa
9	Imo	Owerri	South East	Andrea Oduobi	Ofe Owerri with Pounded Yam
10	Niger	Bida	North Central	Kings Bawa	Beans Soup with Tuwo Shinkafa
11	Akwa Ibom	Uyo	South South	Ernest Essien (MC Miracle)	Edikaikong with Eba
12	Kwara	Ilorin	North Central	Abdulfatai Dan Kazeem	Gbegiri and Tuwo
13	Cross River	Ikom	South South	Ayang Azom Ayang	Edere with Pounded Yam
14	Anambra	Onitsha	South East	Alex Anyalogu	Onugbu Soup with Eba
15	Ondo	Ikare Akoko	South West	Taye Turaya	Obe Efirin with Semovita
16	Enugu	Enugu	South East	Cynthia Okereke	Ofe Oha with Pounded Yam
17	Kano	Kano	North West	Aminu Abba	Miyar Taushe with Guarasa
18	Osun	Osogbo	South West	Kareem Adepoju (Baba Wande)	Ila Alasepo with Pounded Yam
19	Enugu	Nsukka	South East	Kenneth Okonkwo	Ogbono Soup with Eba
20	Edo	Benin	South South	Benedict Ogbeiwo	Omoebe (Black Soup)
21	Plateau	Jos	North Central	Ruby Gyang	Gwote Dankali
22	Osun	Ede	South West	Olofa Ina	Ila Alasepo with Amala
23	Akwa Ibom	Ikot Ekpene	South South	Ezekiel Nya Etuk	Afang Soup with Eba
24	Kogi	Idah	North Central	Love Idoko	Ogbonno Soup with Semovita
25	Kwara	Offa	South West	Tunde Yusuf	Anomo (Potato Porridge)
26	Nasarrawa	Lafia	North Central	Magaji Mijnyawa (Uncle M)	Miyan Busheshen Kubewa with Pounded Yam

== Season 2 ==
The second season of the show kicked off on Saturday 16 March 2019. It premiered with the prestigious city of Ikorodu in Lagos state with Veteran actor Babatunde Omidina popularly referred to as Baba Suwe with the amazing delicacy called Asaro (Yam Porridge). In the second season of the show we visited 26 cities covering all the zones in Nigeria.

EP	STATE	CITY	ZONE	CELEBRITIES	MEAL OF THE DAY
1	Lagos	Ikorodu	South West	Babatunde Omidina (Baba Suwe)	Asaro (Yam Porridge)
2	Kogi	Lokoja	North Central	Halima Abubakar	Afiame Soup and Oje Oskapa
3	Osun	Ilesha	South West	Kunle Coker	Egusi Soup with Pounded Yam
4	Borno	Maiduguri	North East	Arewa Pots (Jassmine Hamman Tukur)	Burabisco
5	Anambra	Nnewi	South East	Amaechi Muonagor	Ukwa
6	Lagos	Badagry	South West	Segun Arinze	Imoyo with Eko
7	Benue	Gboko	North Central	Ada Ameh	Beni Seed Soup with Pounded yam
8	Jigawa	Dutse	North West	Mikail Bin Hassan (Gidigo)	Miyan Gyeda
9	Enugu	Achi	South East	Martins Nnebo (Mc4God)	Abacha
10	Osun	OAU	South West	Femi Branch	Efo riro with Semovita
11	Niger	Minna	North Central	Isah Yakubu (Isah Emarcy)	Miyan Kuka with Tuwo Masara
12	Anambra	Awka	South East	Joy Helen	Fio Fio
13	Mother's day special with Shaka Munirat				Owo with Plantain
14	Katsina	Katsina	North West	Rabiu Rikadawa	Miyan Kubewa Bushenshe
15	Abia	Aba	South East	Chy Nwakanma	Achara Soup with Eba
16	Ekiti	Ado-Ekiti	South West	Ch. Akinlade Ojo Erugale	Isakpa Soup with pounded yam
17	Adamawa	Yola	North East	Hamza Usman	Miyan Yakawa
18	Ondo	Okitipupa	South west	Princess Dupe Adetuwo	Marugbo Soup with Pupuru
19	Gombe	Gombe	North East	Umar Labaran (Umar Gombe)	Kayan Ciki Peppersoup
20	Ebonyi	Abakaliki	South East	Doris Ugo	Achi soup
21	Ogun	Ilaro	South West	Hassanat Taiwo Akinwande (Yetunde Wunmi)	Egusi soup with Fufu
22	Nassarawa	Keffi	North Central	Mohammed Adamu (A. Wamba)	Dafa Duka
23	Ondo	Igbokoda	South West	Chief Adeoye Ikuesan (Akonga)	Orugbo soup with Pupuru
24	Lagos	Ajegunle	South West	Ifeanyi Udeze	Ewedu soup with Amala
25	FCT	UNIABUJA	North Central	Anayo Onyekwere (Kanayo O. Kanayo)	MTN Rice (Palm Oil Rice)
26	Season Finale				Jollof Rice and Chicken
