= Ishaq Sidi Ishaq =

Nigerian actor (born 1983)

- Born: Ishaq Sidi Ishaq
- Education: Bayero University Kano
- Occupations: Actor, film maker, journalist, screenwriter, producer
- Years active: 1996–present
- Notable credit: Best known for directing Wasila
- Spouse: Naseeba Usman (m. 2016)

Ishaq Sidi Ishaq is a Nigerian actor, director, film/theatre journalist, filmmaker, producer, and screenwriter who is a pioneer in the Hausa movie industry in Nigeria. He was appointed as the Kano State Government's Senior Special Assistant to the Executive Governor of Kano State on Creative Industries in May 2021.

== Filmography ==
- Hikima (2021)
- Avenger (2021)
- Jidda as Alkali (2019)
- A Ci Bulus Sagir (2014)
- Misale (2009)
- Wasila (2000)
