= Gidan Badamasi =

Nigerian television series

Gidan Badamasi is a Nigerian television series. It is in the Hausa language.

The series follows a wealthy man with 20 wives and numerous children he cannot support. The show gained significant popularity and sparked public discussion about reproductive choices and economic pressures. Its writer, Nazir Adam Salih, credited the series with prompting conversations about family planning in ways traditional campaigns had not.
