= Snøhvit =

Norwegian natural gas field

Snøhvit (Snow White) Location off Norway
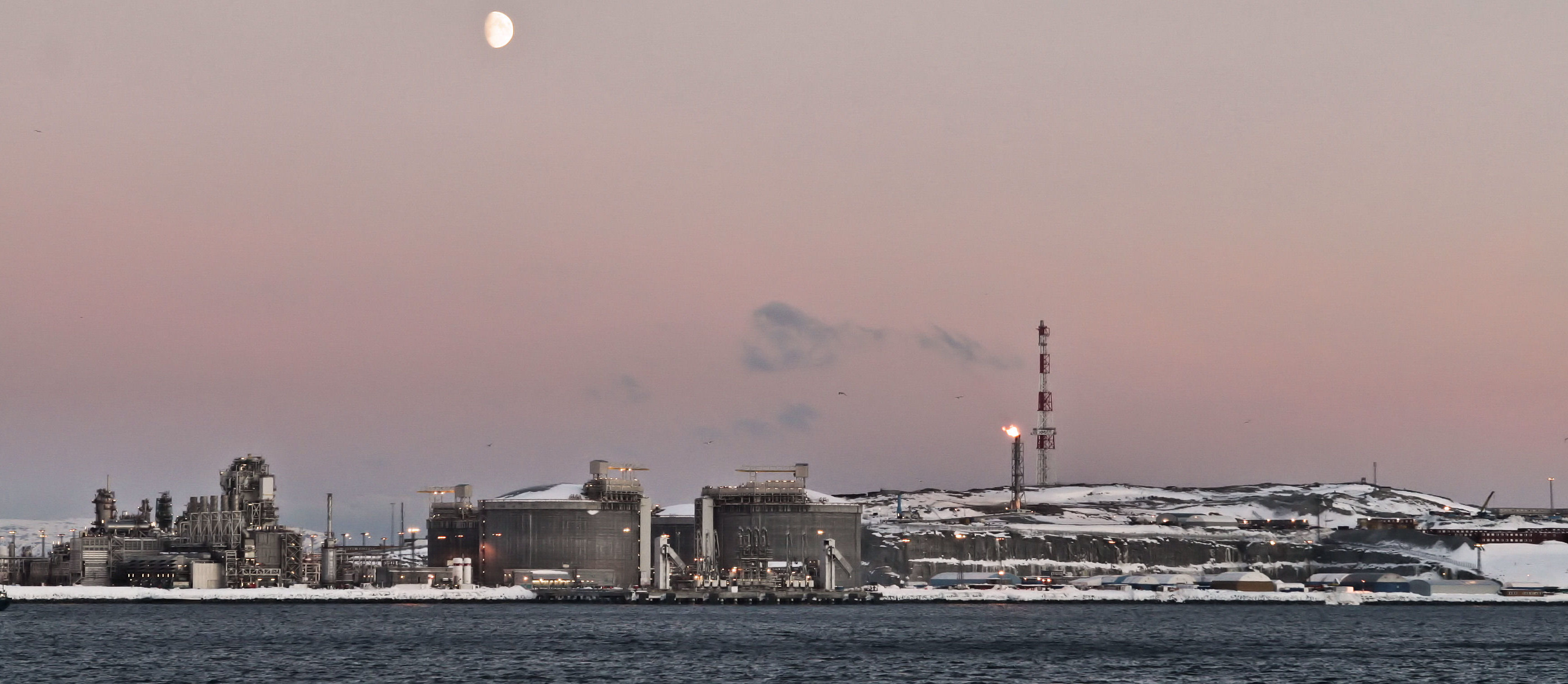
- LNG Gas terminal Melkøya
- Country: Norway
- Location: Norwegian Sea
- Offshore/onshore: offshore
- Coordinates: 71.6°N 21°E
- Operator: Equinor
- Partners: Petoro; TotalEnergies; Engie; Equinor; Hess; RWE Dea

Field history
- Discovery: 1984
- Start of development: 2001
- Start of production: 2006

Production
- Recoverable gas: 193×10^{9} m^{3} (6.8×10^{12} cu ft)

Snøhvit (English: Snow White) is the name of a natural gas field in the Norwegian Sea, situated 140 kilometres (87 mi) northwest of Hammerfest, Norway. The northern part of the Norwegian Sea is often described as the Barents Sea by offshore petroleum companies. Snøhvit is also the name of a development of Snøhvit and the two neighbouring natural gas fields Albatross and Askeladden. Estimated recoverable reserves are 193 billion cubic metres of natural gas, 113 million barrels (18.0×10^{6} m^{3}) of condensate (light oil), and 5.1 million tonnes of natural gas liquids (NGL). The development comprises 21 wells. The Snøhvit development is operated by Equinor on behalf of six gas companies owning licenses:

- Petoro
- TotalEnergies
- Engie
- Equinor
- Hess
- RWE Dea

The fields were discovered in 1984. The development plan was presented by Statoil in 2001, with production starting in 2006. A subsea production system was planned to feed a land-based plant on the island of Melkøya via 160 kilometres (99 mi) long submarine gas pipeline with diameter of 680 millimetres (27 in). The gas from Snøhvit was to be used for liquefied natural gas (LNG) production. The total costs of field development will be around NOK 34.2 billion. The LNG plant will emit 920 thousand tonnes of CO_{2} each year, an increase of Norway's total CO_{2} emissions by almost 2%.

The annual export capacity is 5.75 billion cubic metres of LNG, 747 thousand tonnes of condensate and 247 thousand tonnes of liquified petroleum gas. Long-term export contracts have been signed with Iberdrola in Spain and El Paso in the USA.

The field also holds limited amounts of crude oil. The recent discovery of the nearby Goliat oil field has made the oil reserves at Snøhvit more exploitable.

The development of Snøhvit sparked political controversy in Norway, as it was the first discovery in the Barents Sea to be developed. Environmental groups like Natur og Ungdom and Bellona argued that the Barents Sea is too sensitive for oil and gas production, and that the Melkøya LNG plant would drastically increase Norway's CO_{2} emissions. In the summer of 2002, protesters from Natur og Ungdom were arrested by the police after blocking the construction of the LNG plant at Melkøya for 10 days.

== Geology ==
The reservoir resides in three fault blocks located in the Hammerfest Basin and consists of Lower to Middle Jurassic sandstones.

== Carbon Capture and Storage ==
The Snøhvit gas field uses Carbon Capture and Storage (CCS) to avoid some emissions from gas processing. Gas from the Snøhvit field contains between 5 and 8 percent carbon dioxide. The carbon dioxide is separated in the Hammerfest LNG plant on the island of Melkøya, transported back into the gas field, and injected into geological formations. This project has the capacity to store around 0.7 million tons of carbon dioxide annually. Those emission savings are relatively small compared to the emissions generated by the LNG exported from Snøhvit, which are around 13 million tons.

In 2022, Equinor had announced plans for reinvestments at the Hammerfest LNG plant, including electrification of processes previously powered by fossil gas. The electrification project was controversially discussed, and using carbon capture and storage to avoid these additional emissions was proposed as an alternative. However, according to Equinor, doing so would have been extremely expensive.

Equinor expected costs of around 6,500 Norwegian kroner per ton of carbon dioxide avoided, which is much higher than usual cost estimates for CCS. Equinor proceeded with the electrification project, and it was approved by the Norwegian government in August 2023.

== See also ==
- Energy in Norway
- Carbon capture and storage
- Noweco
