= Museum of Reconstruction =

World War II museum in Hammerfest, Norway

Coordinates: 70.6621°N 23.6779°E

Museum of Reconstruction for Finnmark and North Troms
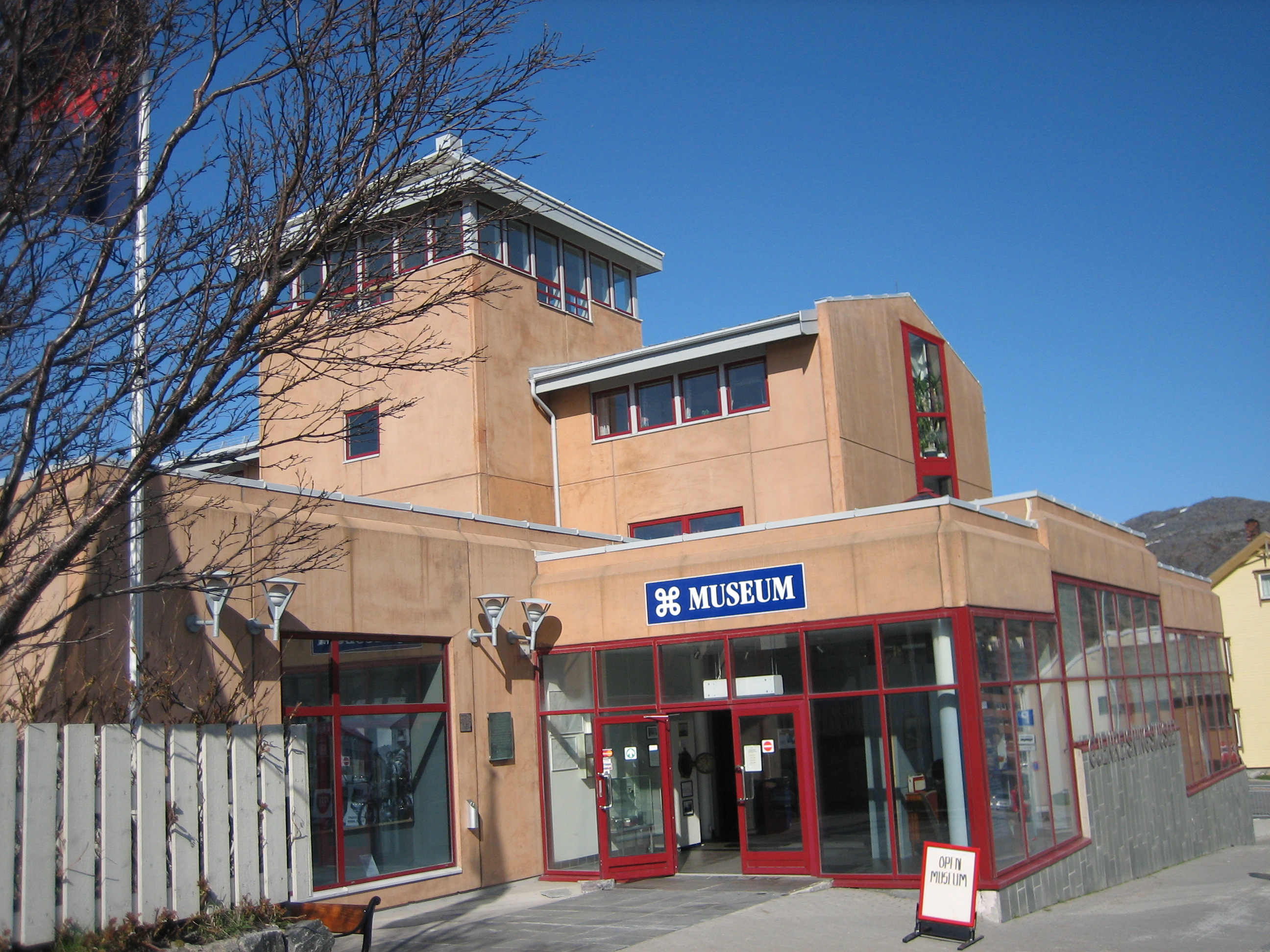
- Established: July 1, 1998
- Location: Hammerfest, Norway
- Director: Turid L. Andreassen
- Website: www.gjenreisningsmuseet.no

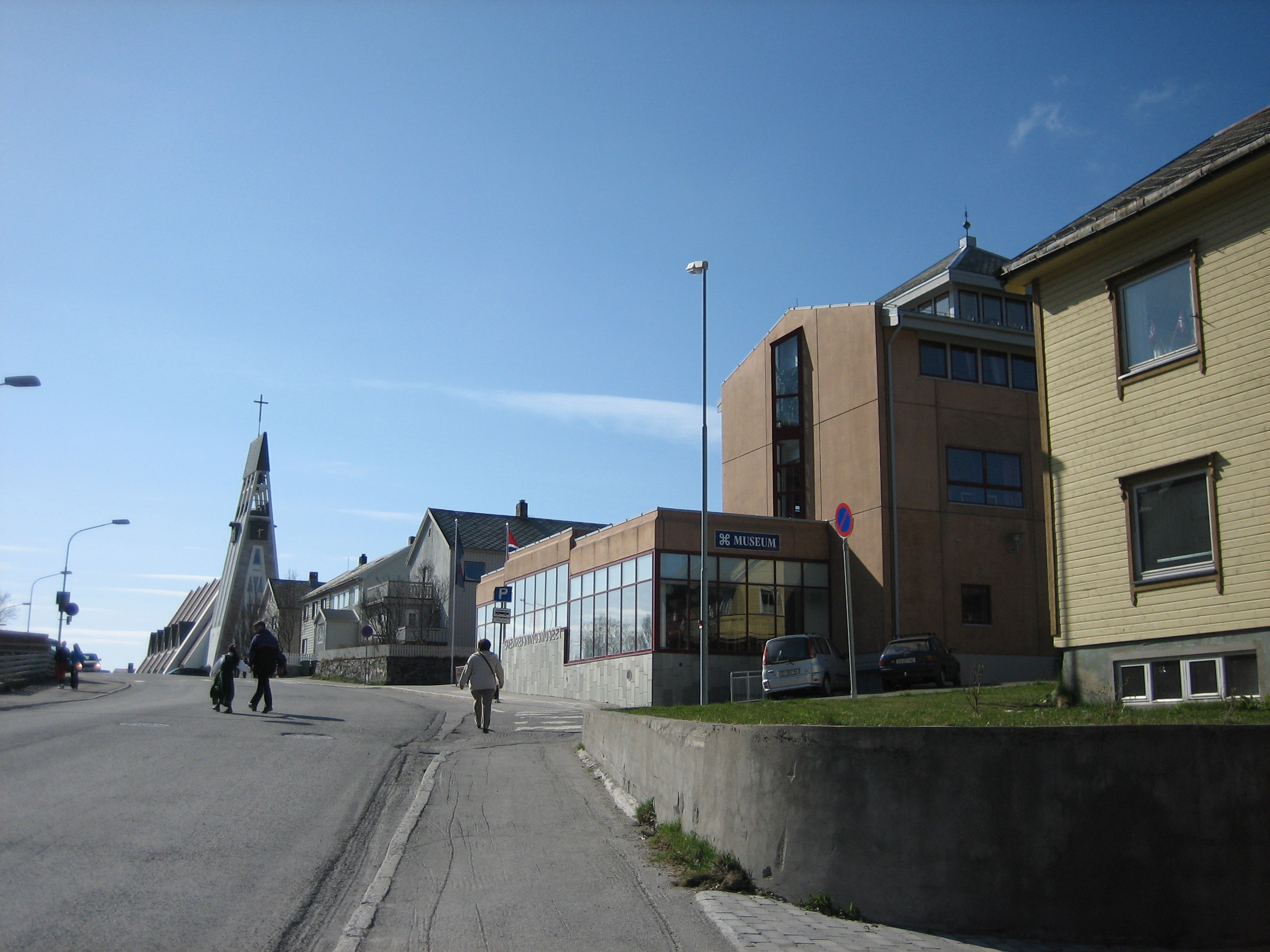
The Museum as seen from the town centre, with Hammerfest Lutheran Church in the background.

The Museum of Reconstruction for Finnmark and North Troms (Norwegian: Gjenreisningsmuseet for Finnmark og Nord-Troms) is a museum in the town of Hammerfest, Norway.

As was much of Northern Norway, the entire town of Hammerfest was razed to the ground by the retreating Nazi German military forces at the end of World War II. The museum commemorates this event with a wide range of displays, including both photographs and many items from the town from around that time. The first part of the main sequence of exhibits, on the ground floor, depicts the events themselves; the second consists largely of a series of reconstructions of the town during and following its reconstruction. There are homes, workplaces and other such tableaux, composed mostly of authentic items retained from that time, clearly showing how shockingly basic life was at first as the town's residents rebuilt their homes and lives, literally and exactly from the ground up.

Since the locals knew the troops were coming and what they would do, there was a little time to prepare. The local barber's pride and joy was his authentic American barbershop chair, imported from Chicago before the war. As many people did with their most precious possessions, he wrapped the chair in tarpaulin and buried it in his garden. When the building was reconstructed some years later, he dug up the chair and it was proudly reinstated in his parlour, where it remained for some decades. Now, it is in the museum.

Later displays on the tour show how life progressed in the postwar years. Single-room dwellings housing whole families were gradually replaced with multiple rooms, then the standard of furnishings starts to rise. By the 1950s, there are Norwegian-language fashion magazines in the home, reflecting the fact that by this time there is an actual choice of furnishings, clothing and so on available and that people once again have enough disposable income to spend on non-essentials. This is arguably due to the rapid growth in the Norwegian economy around this time.

As the town slopes steeply away from its shore and harbour, and the museum is situated some way inland, the building's central tower is one of the town's tallest structures and commands panoramic views across the whole region. Each floor of the tower contains a photo gallery; these successively show the phases of architecture in the region.

Attached to the museum is a secondary, subsidiary museum concerning the history of telecommunications in Norway, especially the construction of the 19th Century CE telegraph system which linked the outlying regions of this vast and often hostile and nearly impassable country.

The museum is arguably of primary interest to Norwegian nationals, many of whom travel through Hammerfest when taking the Hurtigruten steamship line, whose ships call in there daily, all year round, on their way between Bergen and Kirkenes in the far east of the country. Since a typical visit is of only two or three hours, there is little time to visit both the Isbjørnklubben and the Museum of Reconstruction and to explore the town. Most of the displays in the main museum are labelled only in Norwegian. One can, however, borrow foreign language guidebooks (English, German, French, Spanish, Italian, Russian, Finnish and Sami). These are also displayed in the museums homepage www.gjenreisningsmuseet.no. The telecomms section is also multilingual.
