= Hammerfest Church =

- Hammerfest kirke
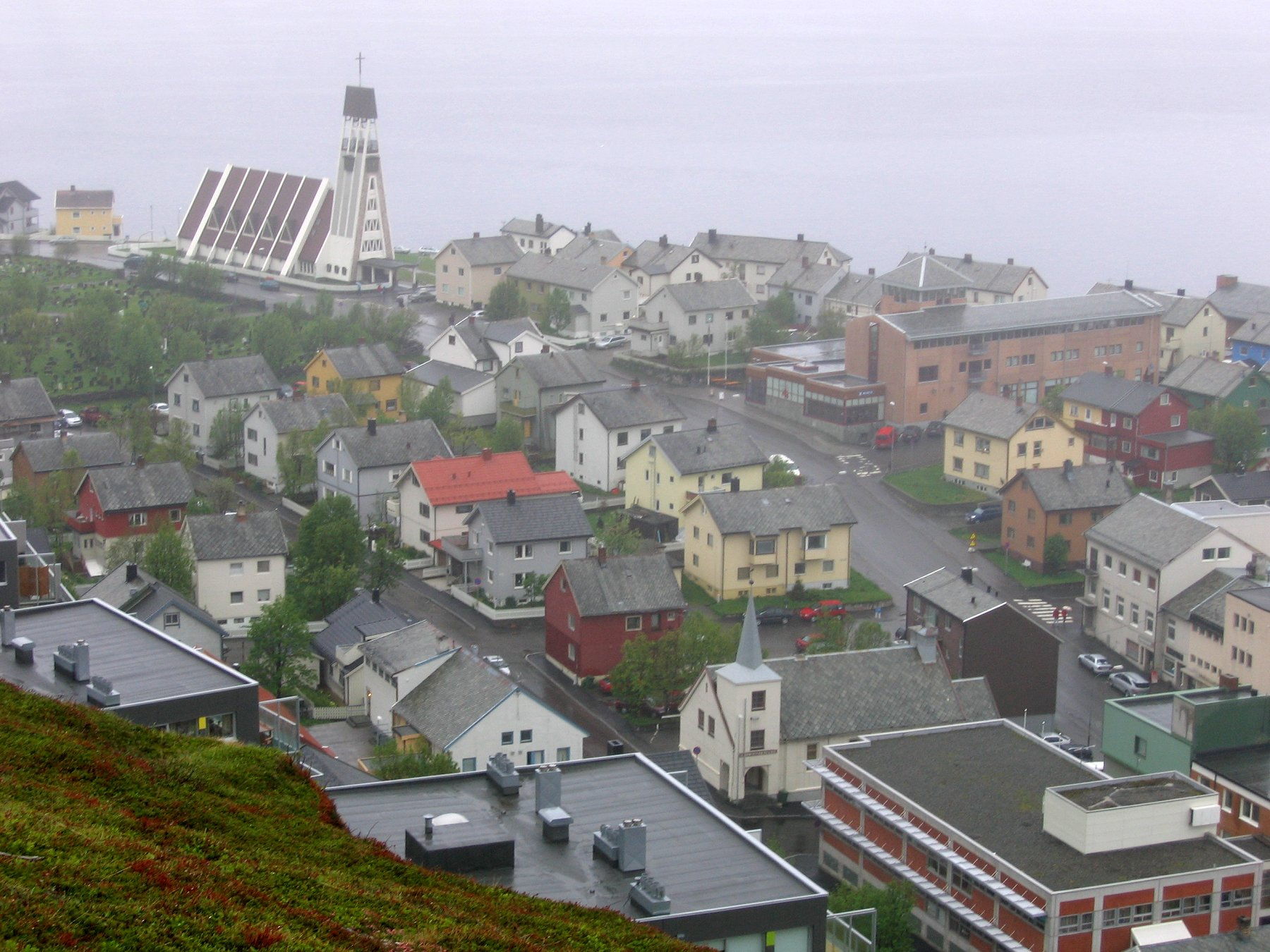
- View of the church
- Hammerfest Church
- 70.661668°N 23.6751702°E
- Location: Hammerfest Municipality, Finnmark
- Country: Norway
- Denomination: Church of Norway
- Churchmanship: Evangelical Lutheran

History
- Status: Parish church
- Founded: c. 1620
- Consecrated: July 1961

Architecture
- Functional status: Active
- Architect: Hans Magnus
- Architectural type: Long church
- Completed: 1961 (65 years ago)

Specifications
- Capacity: 525
- Materials: Concrete

Administration
- Diocese: Nord-Hålogaland
- Deanery: Hammerfest prosti
- Parish: Hammerfest
- Norwegian Cultural Heritage Site
- Type: Church
- Status: Listed
- ID: 84473

Hammerfest Church (Norwegian: Hammerfest kirke) is a parish church of the Church of Norway in Hammerfest Municipality in Finnmark county, Norway. It is located in the town of Hammerfest. It is the church for the Hammerfest parish which is the seat of the Hammerfest prosti (deanery) in the Diocese of Nord-Hålogaland. The white, concrete church was built in a long church style in 1961 using plans drawn up by the architect Hans Magnus. The church seats about 525 people.

== History ==
The first church built in Hammerfest was in 1620. It was a simple wooden chapel. In 1684, that church was torn down and replaced with a new building. Around 1695, a new sacristy was added to the building. In 1704, the church roof was repaired and in 1712 the church got 9 new windows installed. The church was soon too small for the town. Construction began on a new, larger church around 1740. The new church was a cruciform design with 16 windows and a small spire on top of a tower.

In 1814, this church served as an election church (Norwegian: valgkirke). Together with more than 300 other parish churches across Norway, it was a polling station for elections to the 1814 Norwegian Constituent Assembly which wrote the Constitution of Norway. This was Norway's first national election. Each church parish was a constituency that elected people called "electors" who later met together in each county to elect the representatives for the assembly that was to meet in Eidsvoll later that year.

In 1840, the church was replaced with a new building once again. The town of Hammerfest had a major fire in 1890 in which about two-thirds of the town burned down, including the church. In 1893, a new church was built using designs by the architect H. Bucher. That church was burned to the ground by the retreating German army as they left Finnmark in 1944. That church was situated near the present location. The current church was a part of the large reconstruction project in Hammerfest that was consecrated in July 1961.

== Media gallery ==
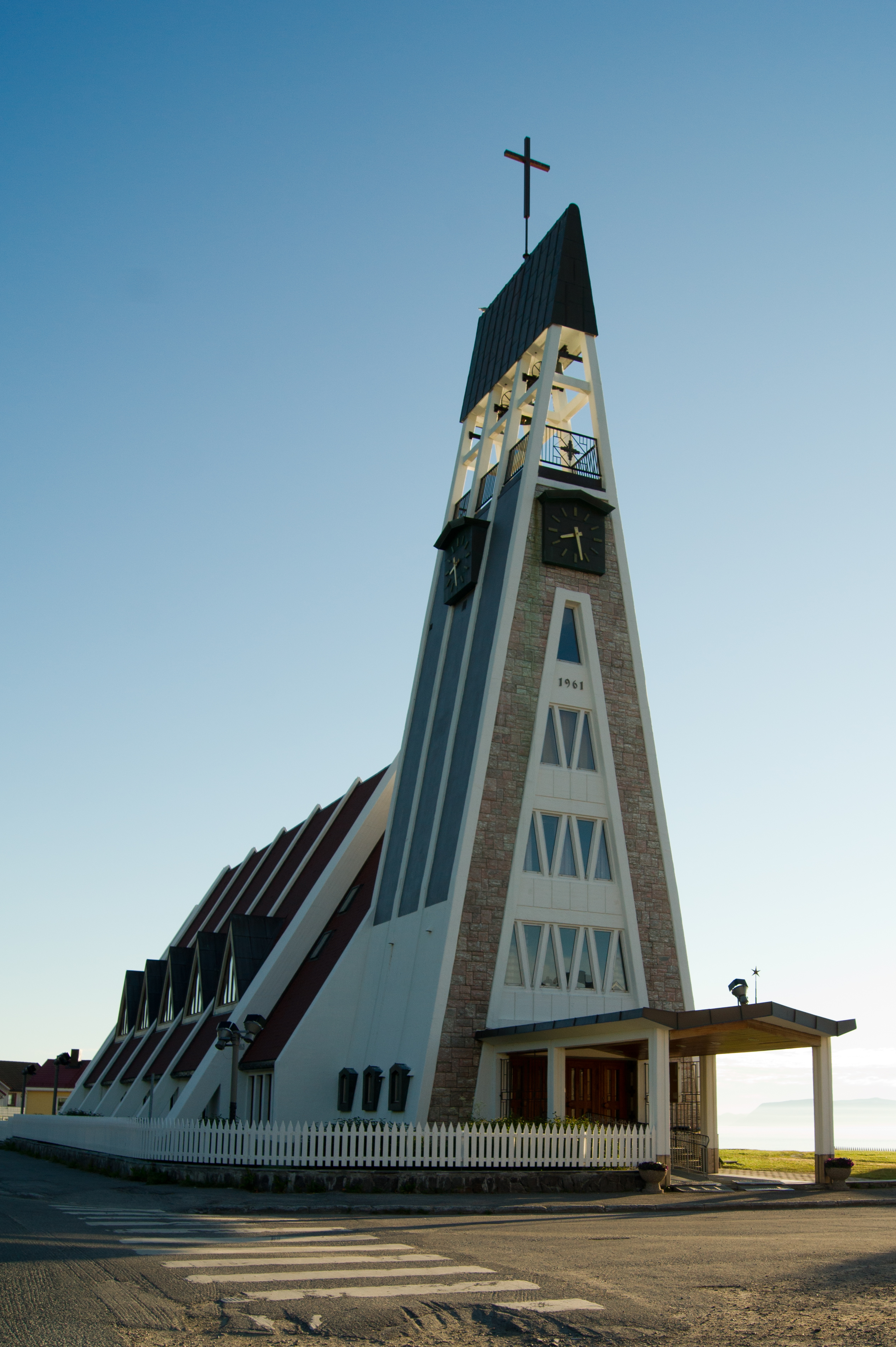
Exterior

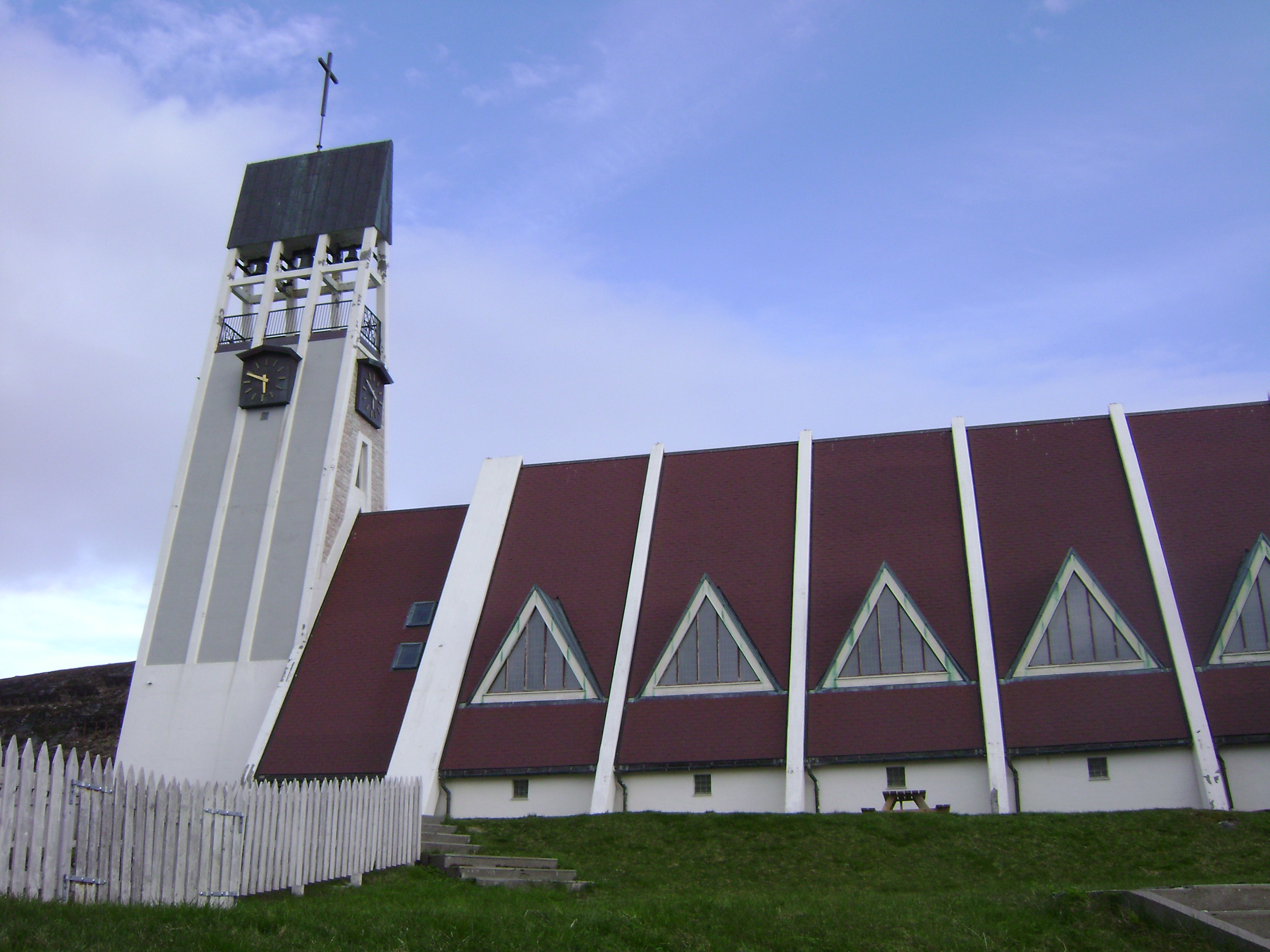
North side of church

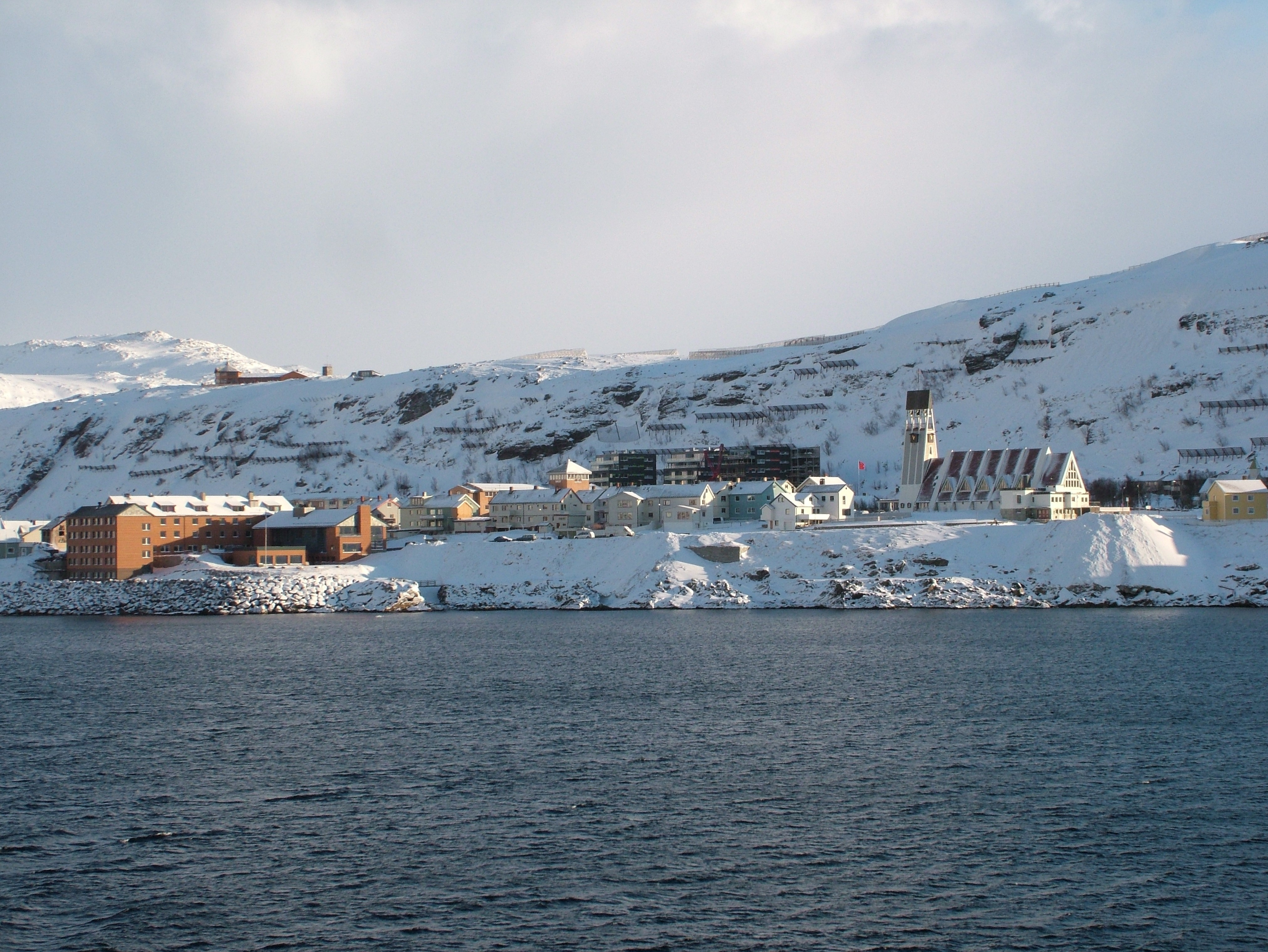
View looking south at the church

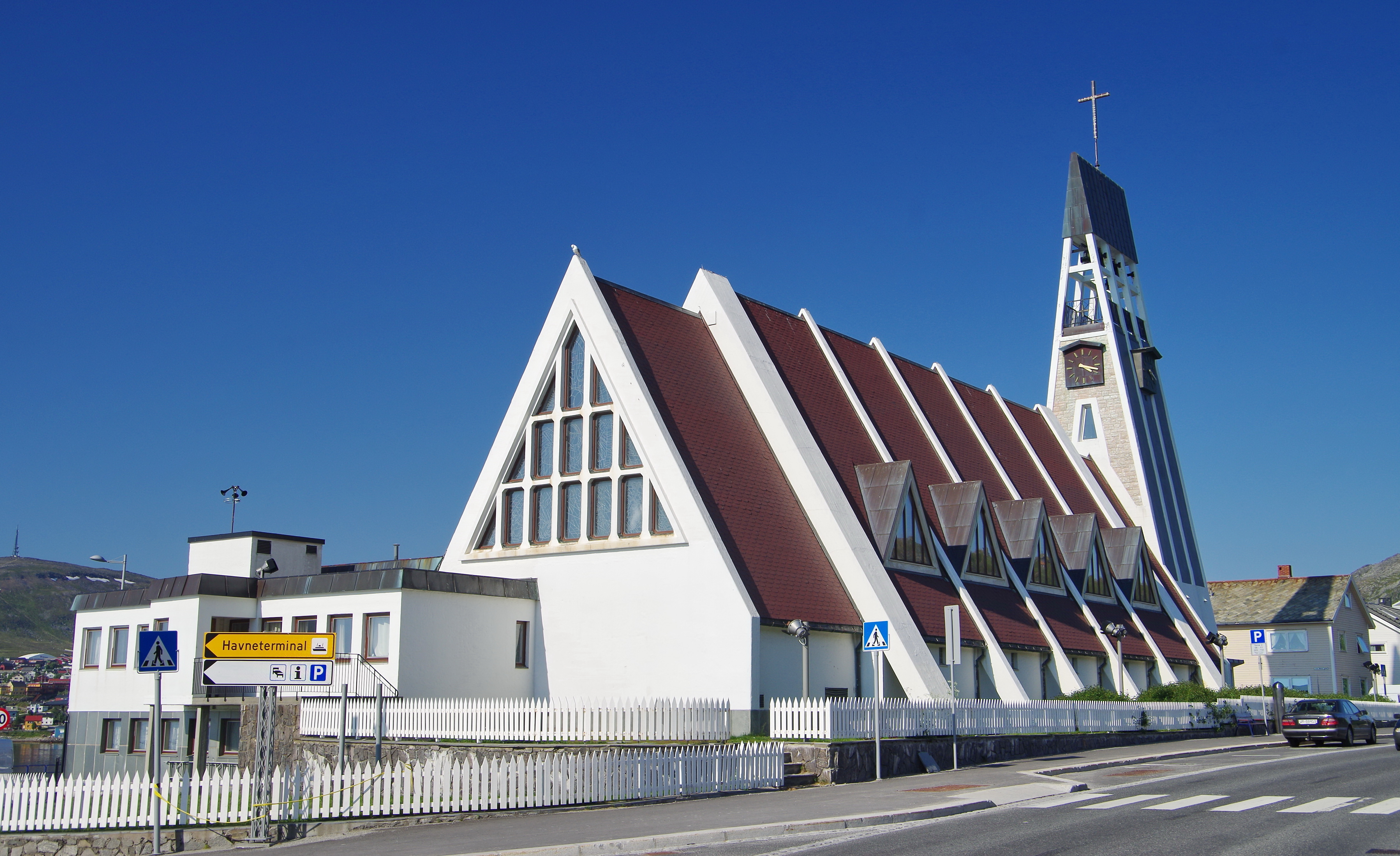
Exterior view

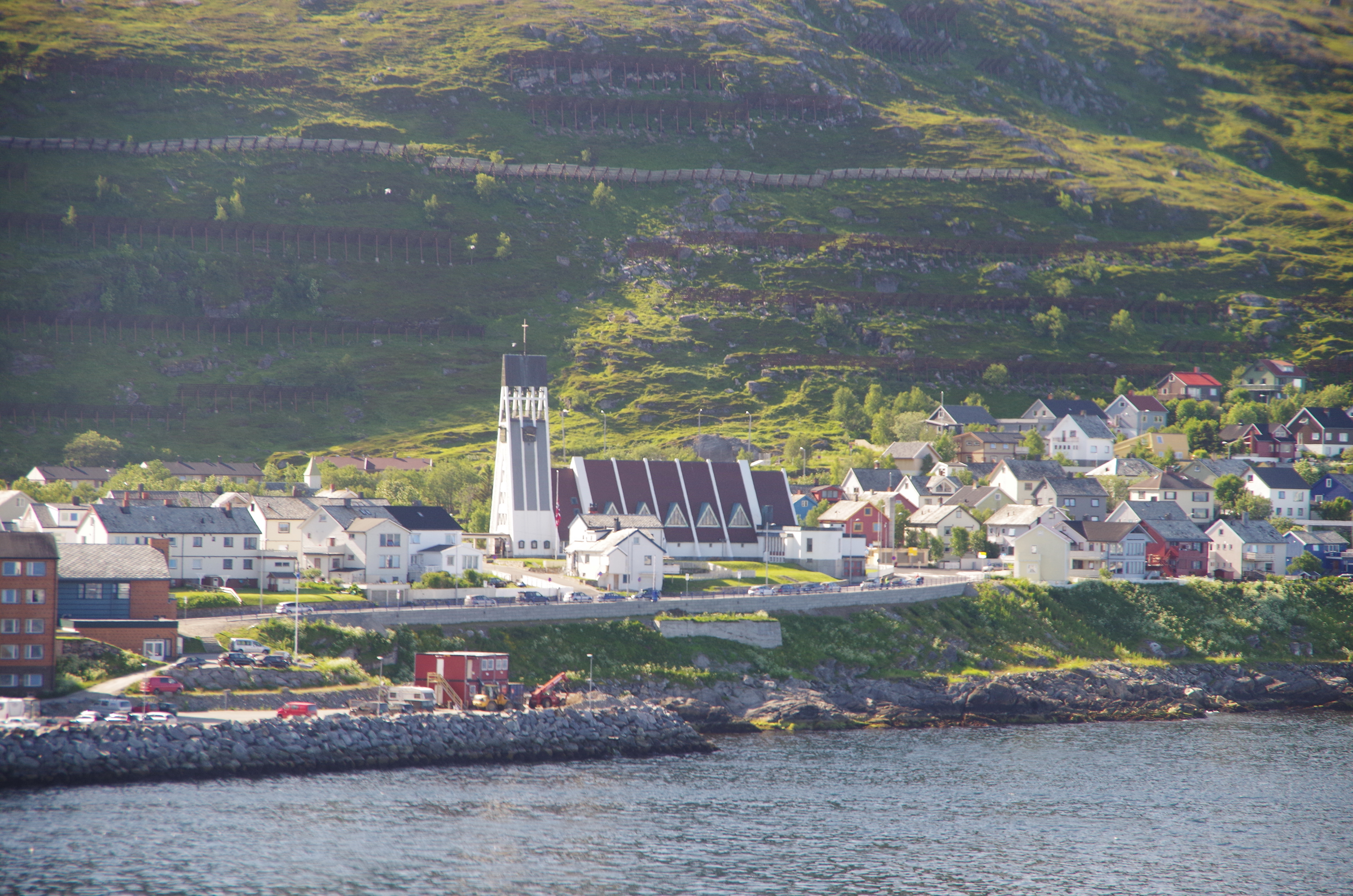
View of the town

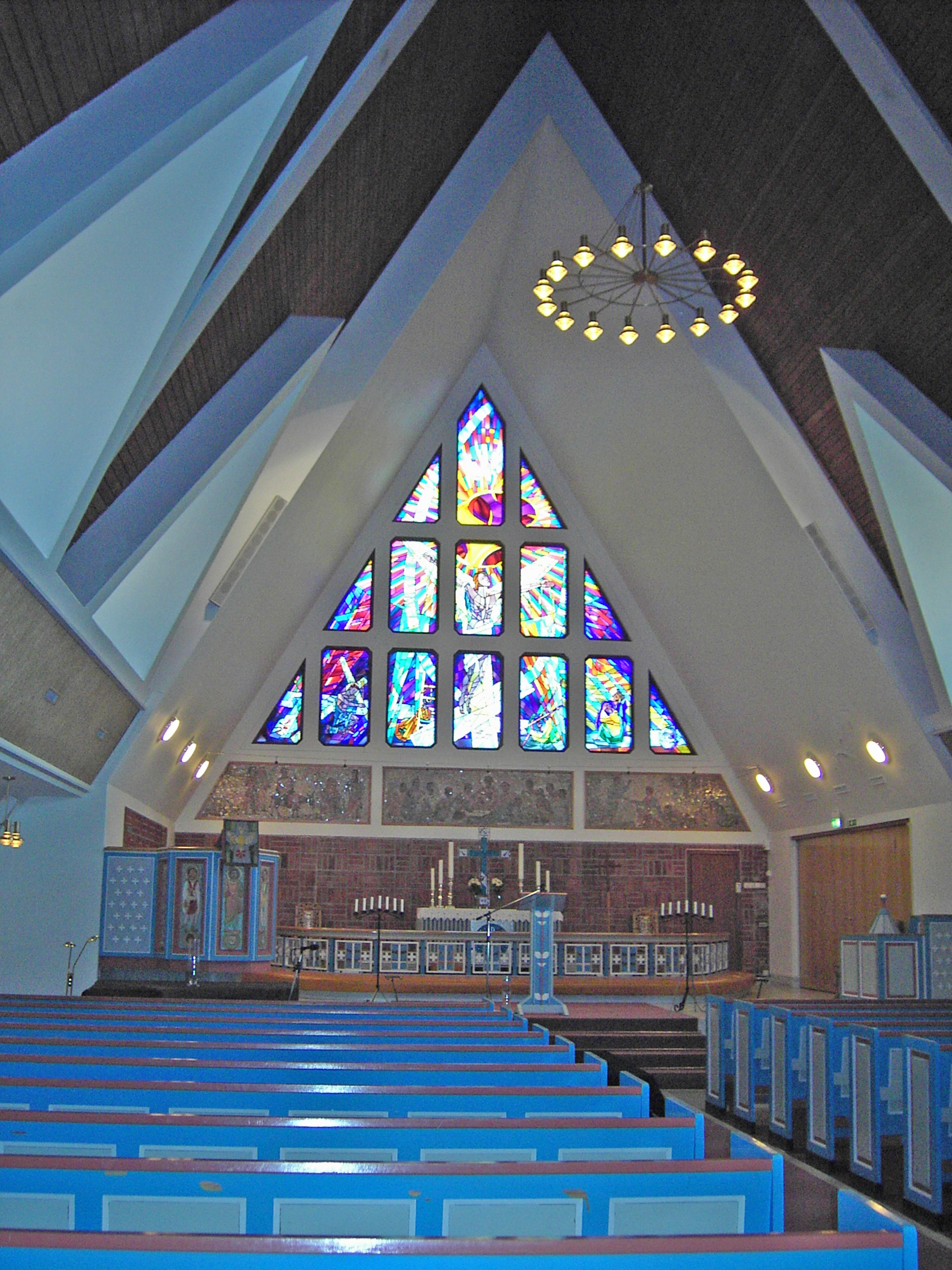
Interior

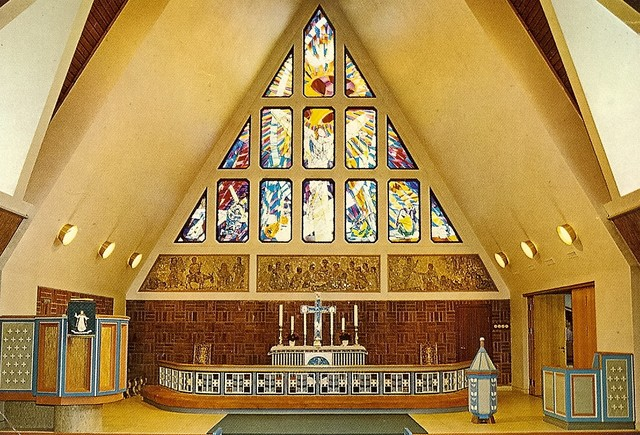
Interior

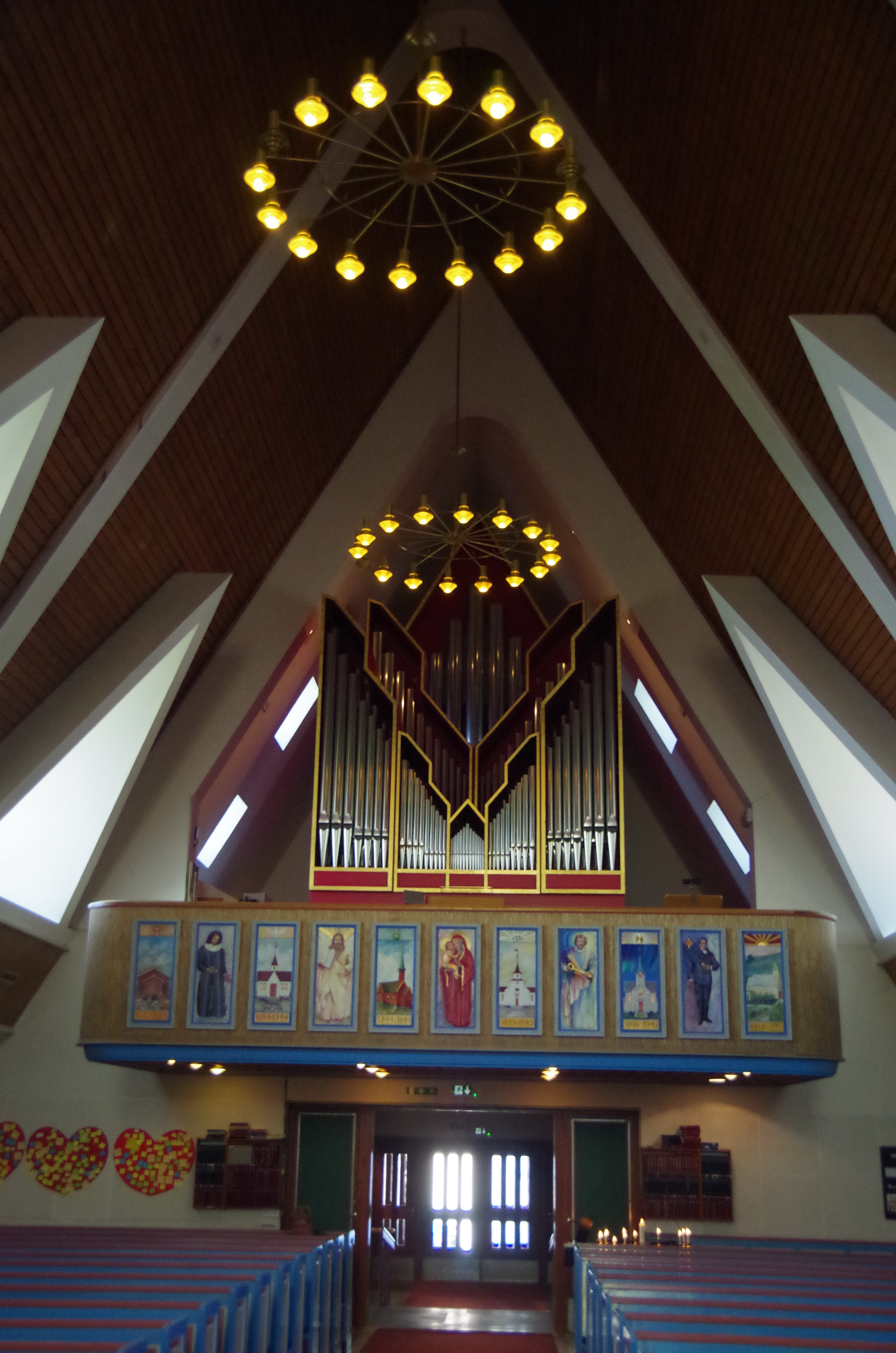
Organ

== See also ==
- List of churches in Nord-Hålogaland
