= Noweco =

Norwegian industrial company

Norwegian Welding Control AS
- Company type: Private
- Industry: Industry
- Founded: 1990
- Headquarters: Harstad, Norway
- Key people: Hans-Peder Olsen, CEO
- Products: Nondestructive testing, Welding, Certification, Engineering, Quality assurance, Inspection, Identification
- Number of employees: 10
- Website: www.noweco.no

Noweco, or Norwegian Welding Control AS, is an industrial company based in Harstad and Hammerfest, Norway. It provides services related to the onshore and offshore industries. The company is owned by Norwegian Welding Company and its employees.

== Services ==
It offers the following services:

- Nondestructive testing
- Consultancy on Welding technology, Quality Assurance and Inspection.
- Technical and Financial Optimisation of Welding Processes.
- Consultancy in connection with Tenders and Tender Conditions of Welding Work.
- Accredited Certification of Welders.
- Verification of Welding Procedures.

== Approvals ==
- Thickness measurement by DNV and Lloyd's Register amongst others.
- Company approval in accordance with EN 729
- Achilles
