= Melkøya =

Island in Hammerfest, Norway

Melkøya (Norwegian); Muolkkut (Northern Sami)
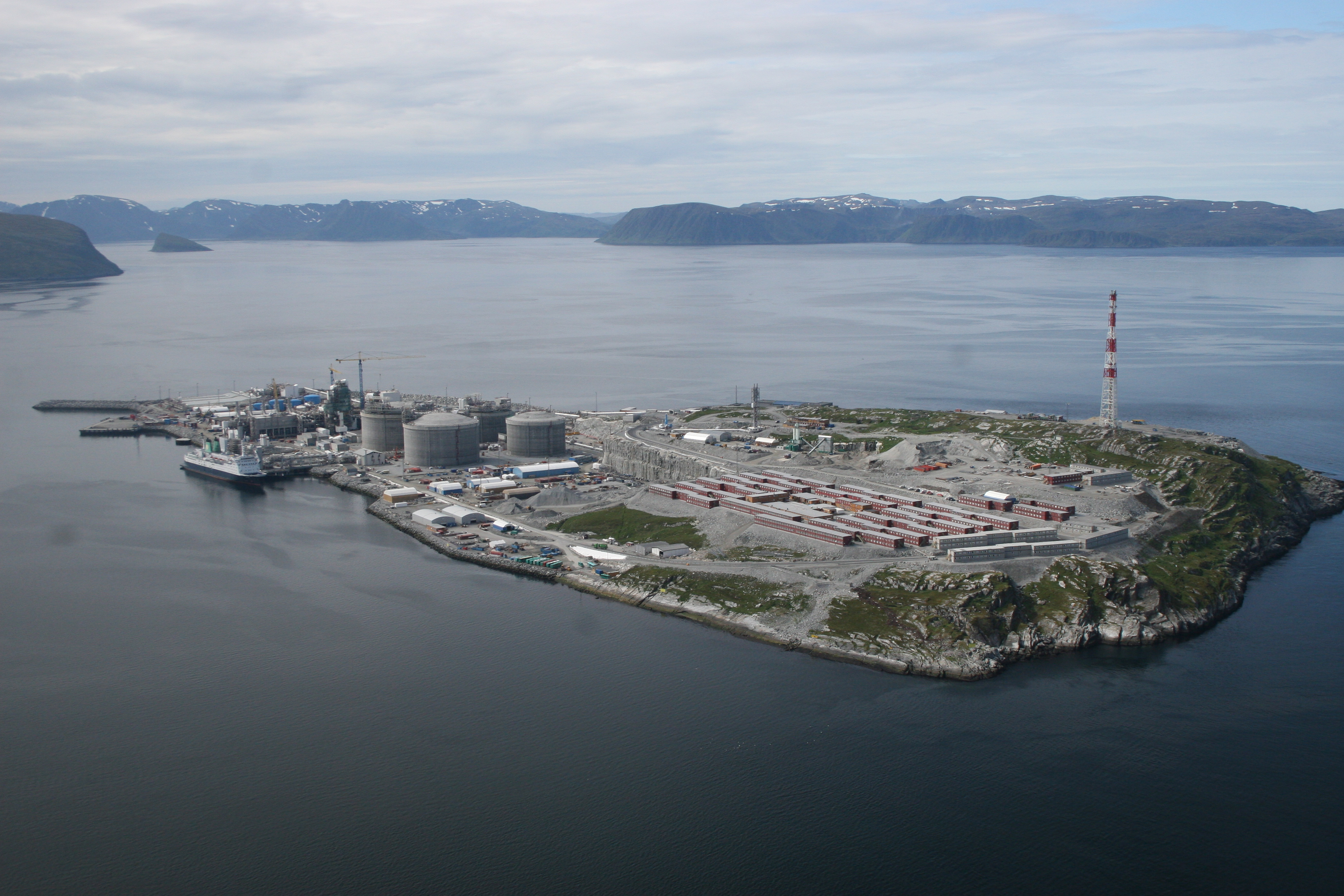
- Interactive map of: Melkøya (Norwegian); Muolkkut (Northern Sami)

Geography
- Location: Finnmark, Norway
- Coordinates: 70.6900°N 23.5990°E
- Area: 0.69 km^{2} (0.27 sq mi)
- Length: 1.6 km (0.99 mi)
- Width: 810 m (2660 ft)
- Highest elevation: 71 m (233 ft)

Administration
- Norway
- County: Finnmark
- Municipality: Hammerfest Municipality

Melkøya (Norwegian) or Muolkkut (Northern Sami) is an island in Hammerfest Municipality in Finnmark county, Norway. The 0.69-square-kilometre (170-acre) island is connected to the town of Hammerfest (on the neighbouring island of Kvaløya to the west) by the 2,316 metres-long Melkøysund Tunnel, which was completed in 2003.

The industrial island is the endpoint of the undersea pipeline that transports natural gas from the Snøhvit natural gas fields in the Barents Sea. The gas goes through the 168-kilometre (104 mi) long pipeline to the processing plant Hammerfest LNG on Melkøya where 18 million cubic metres per day is converted into liquefied natural gas. The plant opened in 2007 and is operated by Equinor. After a fire closed the plant in 2020, it re-opened in 2022. Liquefied natural gas is then exported from Melkøya to world markets by a LNG gas carrier or tanker. The plant emitted 0.9 million tonnes of CO_{2} in 2023.

In Q2 2025, media started reporting about some incidents and accidents in regard to gas leaks and worker safety. In July 2025, for the first time, a worker spoke without anonymity, about one of the incidents [at the LNG terminal]. Media has later reported about two cases, of workers that lost their work with employment agency, after having spoken with media about safety issues. Equinor does not have a procedure for getting its employees [or subcontractor]s quickly to a doctor, when gas leaks happen.

== History ==
The island was previously used for farming, and rental houses for seasonal fishermen were also built on the island.

In 2001 and 2002, major archaeological investigations on Melkøya were undertaken before Statoil's development of the island began. The development of the island has changed Melkøya completely. On 21 August 2007, the gas from the Snøhvit field began flowing to Melkøya.

The endangered black-legged kittiwake adopted a man-made cliff at the facility for nesting, making it one of the largest kittiwake colonies in the world.

== Media gallery ==
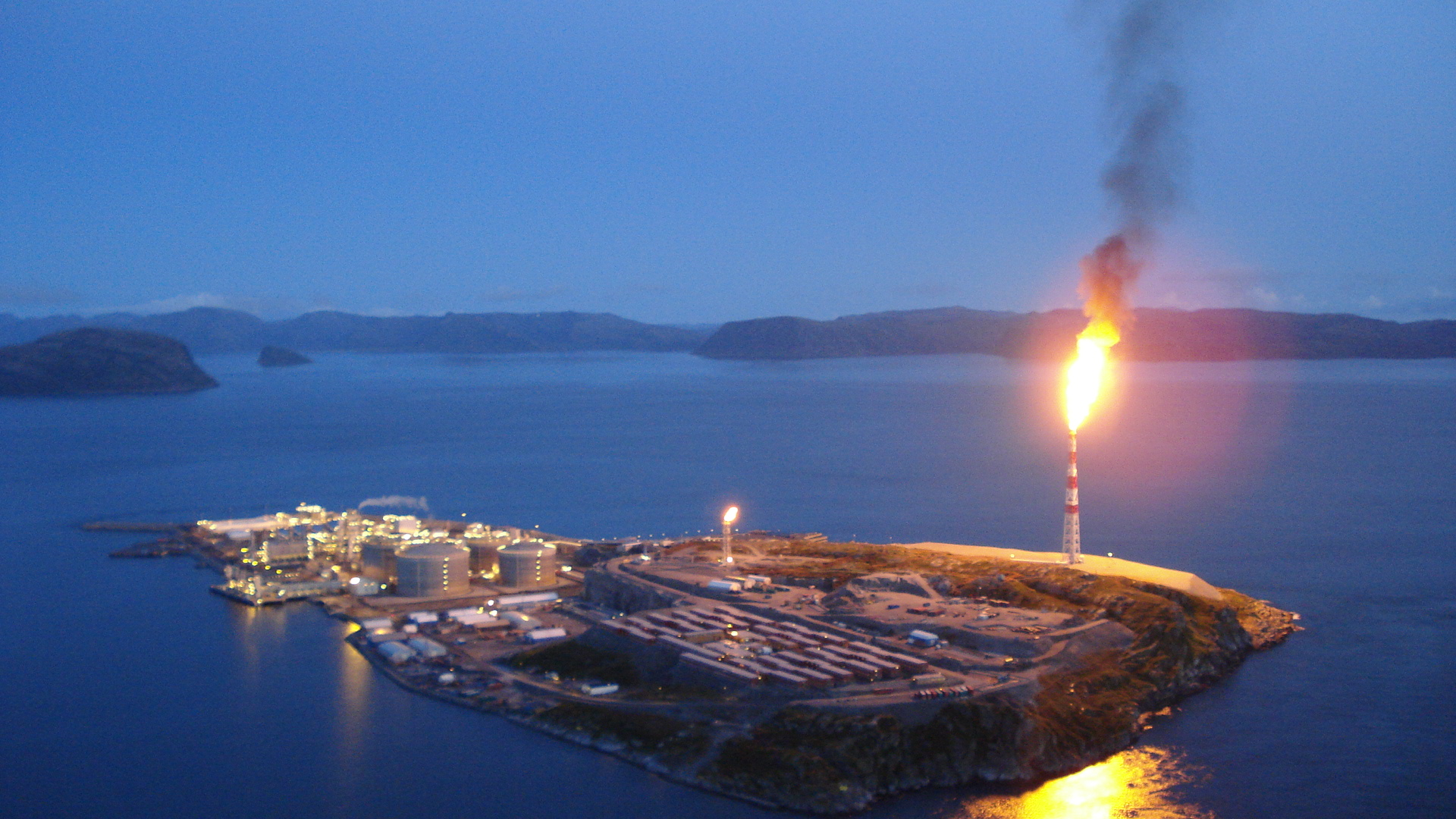
Evening view of the island

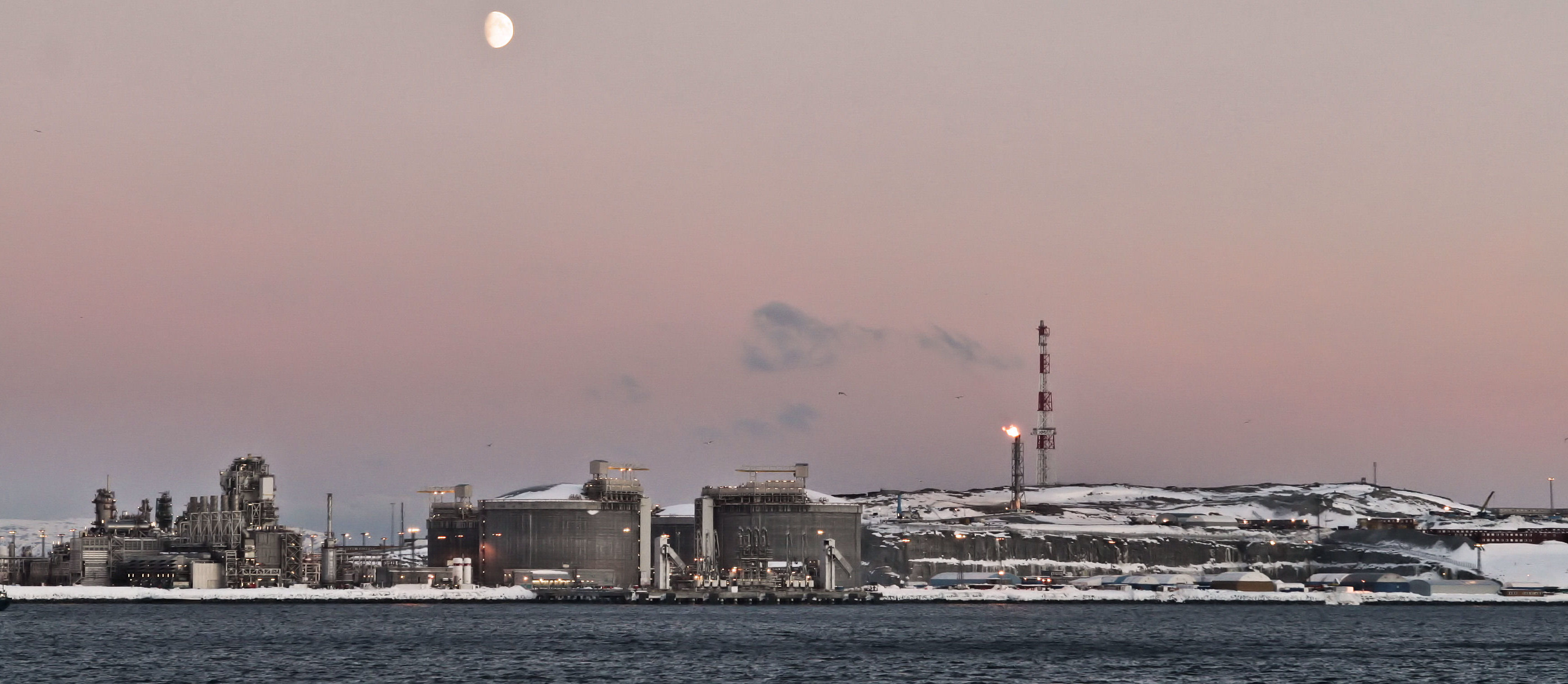
View in winter

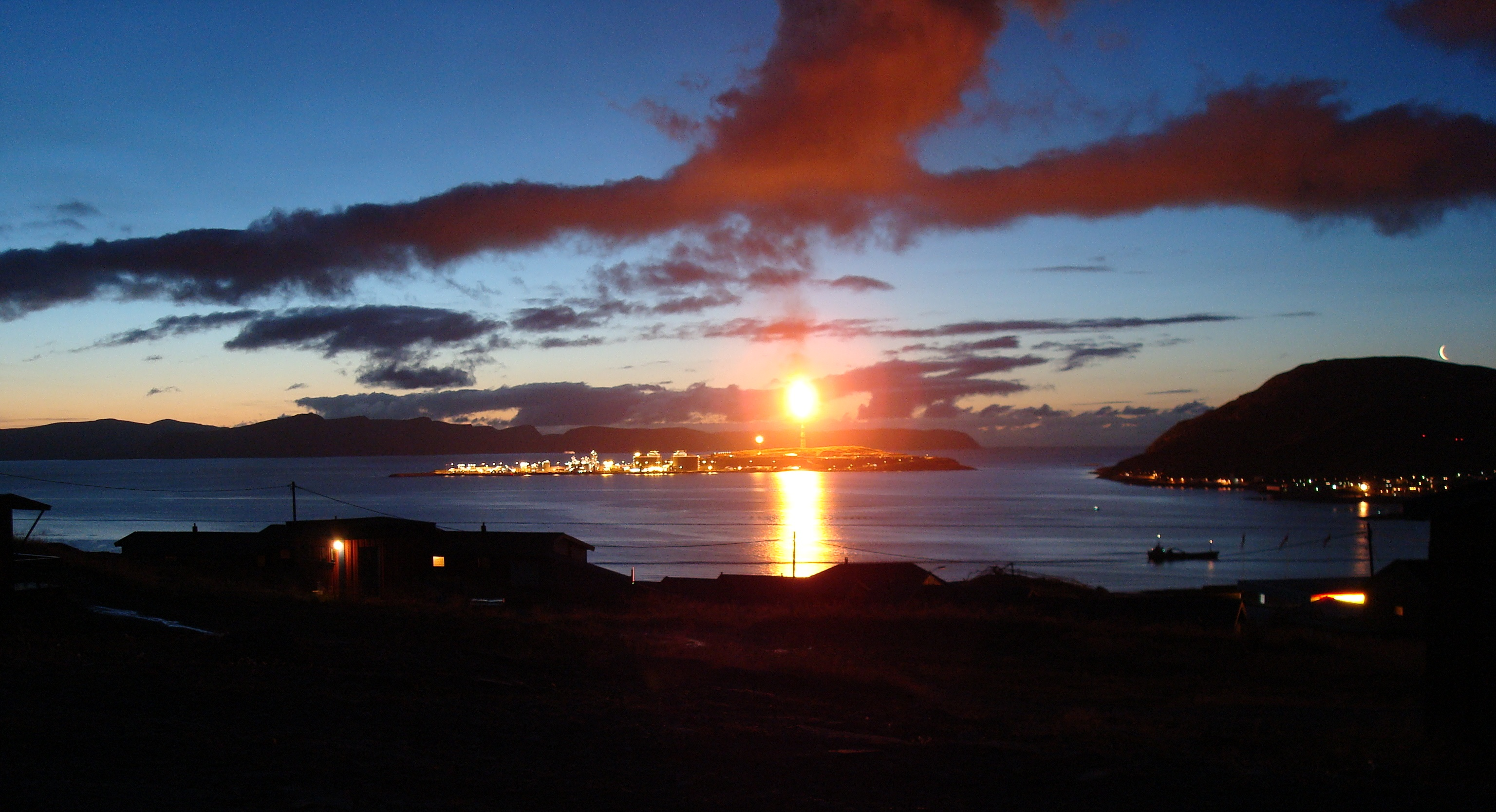
View of the Hammerfest area, including Melkøya

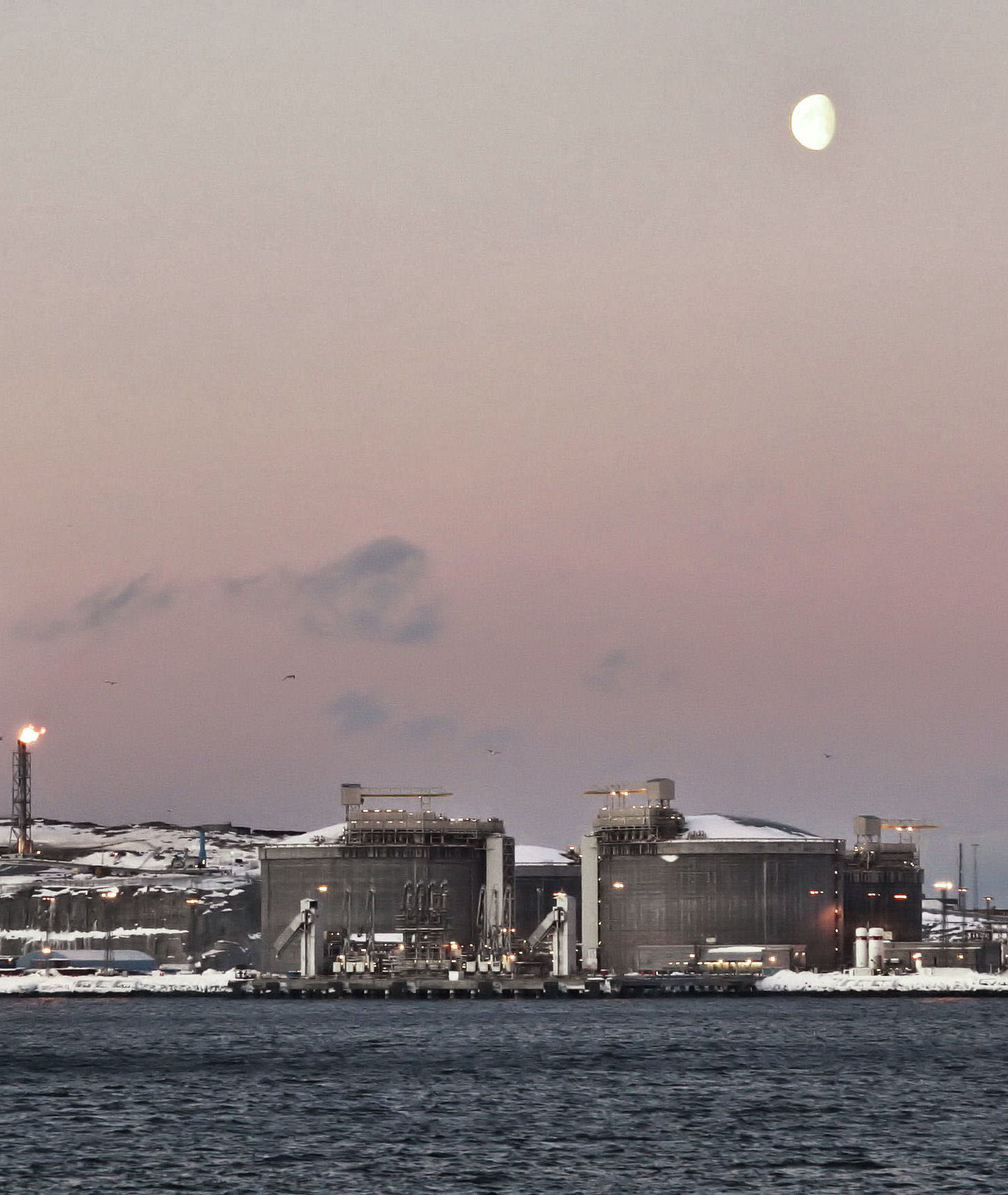
View of the storage tanks

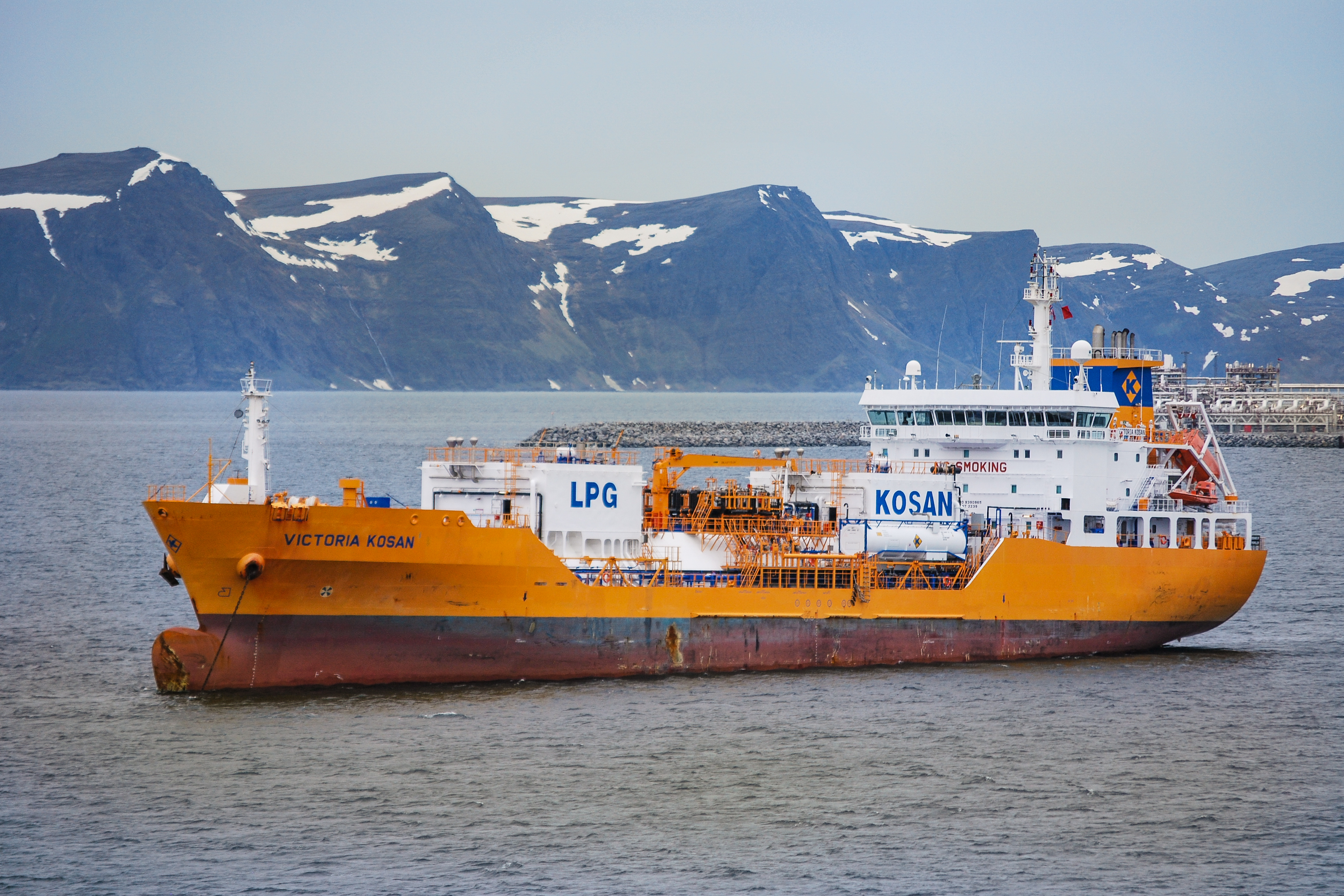
LPG tanker waiting to load liquefied natural gas at Melkøya.

== See also ==
- List of islands of Norway
