= Hammerfest =

City in Finnmark, Norway

- Town/City (Note: In the Norwegian language, the word by can be translated as "town" or "city".)
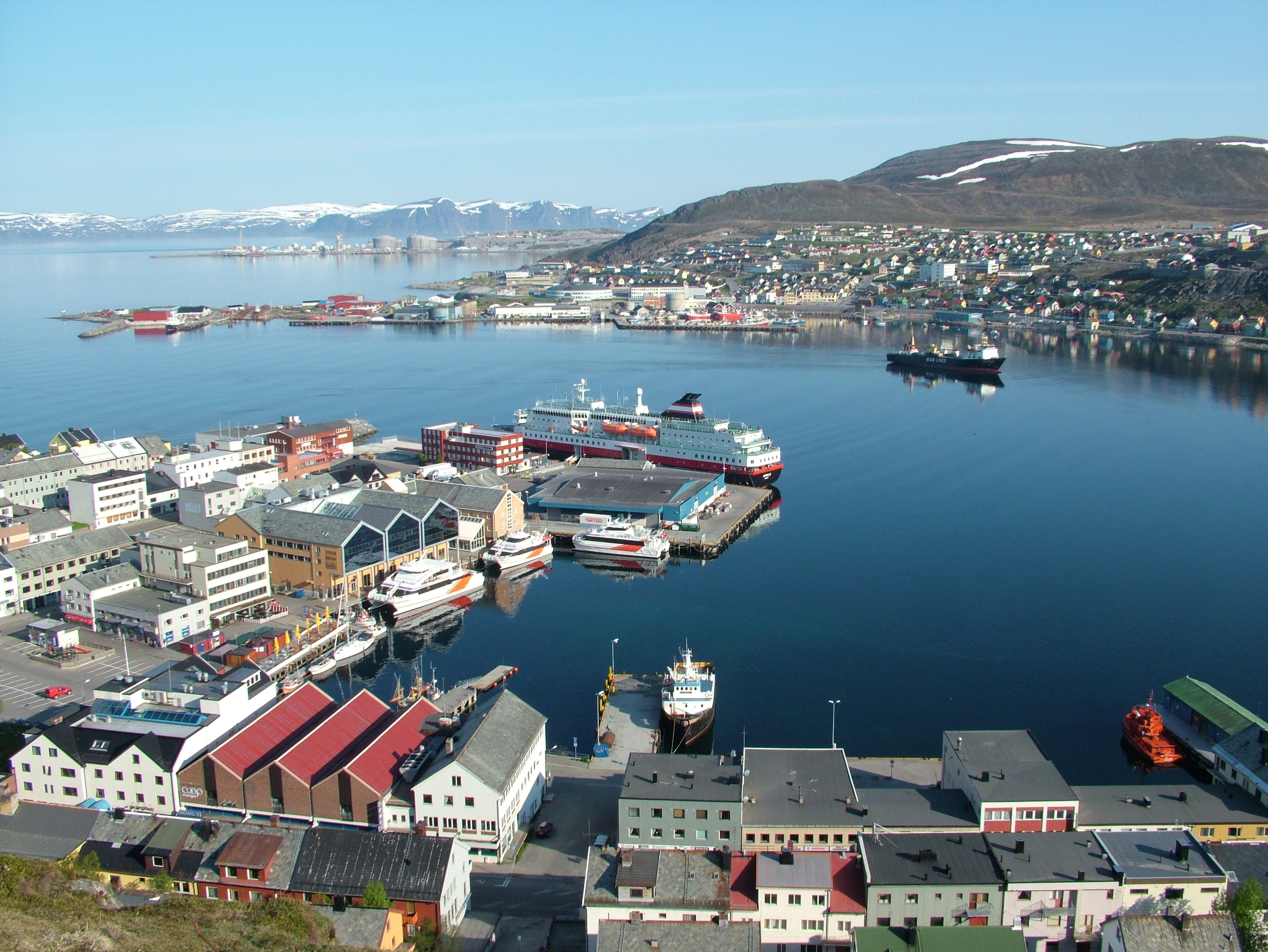
- View of the city
- Interactive map of Hammerfest
- Location within Finnmark Location within Norway
- Coordinates: 70.6634°N 23.6821°E
- Country: Norway
- Region: Northern Norway
- County: Finnmark
- District: Vest-Finnmark
- Municipality: Hammerfest Municipality
- Established as
- Kjøpstad: 1789

Area
  - Total: 3.02 km^{2} (1.17 sq mi)
- Elevation: 2 m (6.6 ft)

Population (2023)
  - Total: 7,882
  - Density: 2,610/km^{2} (6,800/sq mi)
- Demonym: Hammerfesting
- Time zone: UTC+01:00 (CET)
  - Summer (DST): UTC+02:00 (CEST)
- Post Code: 9600 Hammerfest
- Former municipality
- Hammerfest kjøpstad
- Finnmark within Norway

- Hammerfest within Finnmark
- Country: Norway
- County: Finnmark
- District: Vest-Finnmark
- Established: 1852
  - Preceded by: Hammerfest by og landdistrikt
- Disestablished: 1 Jan 1992
  - Succeeded by: Hammerfest Municipality
- Administrative centre: Hammerfest

Area (upon dissolution)
  - Total: 2.9 km^{2} (1.1 sq mi)

Official language
  - Norwegian form: Neutral
- Time zone: UTC+01:00 (CET)
  - Summer (DST): UTC+02:00 (CEST)
- ISO 3166 code: NO-2001

Hammerfest or Hámmárfeasta is a town/city that is also the administrative centre of Hammerfest Municipality in Finnmark county, Norway. It is located on the northwestern coast of the island of Kvaløya, just north of the village of Rypefjord and southwest of the village of Forsøl. The 3.02-square-kilometre (750-acre) town has a population (2023) of 7,882 which gives the city a population density of 2,610 inhabitants per square kilometre (6,800/sq mi).

The town has an ice-free harbour, including the nearby island of Melkøya, which is home to a natural gas processing station. It processes gas from the Snøhvit gas field in the Barents Sea. Rypefjord is a suburb to the south of the city. The main church for the city and municipality is Hammerfest Church. The "midnight sun" is above the horizon from 15 May to 31 July, and the period with continuous daylight lasts a bit longer. Polar night, on the other hand, lasts from 23 November to 19 January. The town is visited by cruise ships from all over the world each summer. In 2016, there were about 19,000 tourists who visited the city of Hammerfest. The town also attracts winter visitors seeking northern lights experiences during the polar night season.

== Northernmost city ==
Hammerfest claims to be the northernmost city in the world, a title disputed by the nearby Norwegian town of Honningsvåg (achieved town status 1996). The validity of the claim depends upon one's definition of a town/city. The Norwegian language does not distinguish between city and town. The closest translation for either term is the word by, meaning the translation from Norwegian to English is ambiguous. Hammerfest is further south than Honningsvåg and has a population of nearly 8,000 people (and over 11,000 people living in the municipality). A Norwegian law from 1997 says a municipality must have over 5,000 residents in order for it to declare town status to one of its settlements. Parliament did not make this provision retroactive. Honningsvåg was given town status prior to the 1997 law, so it is a town under current Norwegian law, making Honningsvåg the northernmost town in Norway. Thus, Hammerfest is the northernmost town with more than 5,000 residents. This is a point of contention between the two towns, who both claim to be the northernmost town in Norway. Utqiagvik, Alaska, population c. 4,000–5,000, which is further north than both the Norwegian towns, does not lay claim to the title of northernmost town. There are many other smaller "northernmost settlements" in the world.

== History ==
=== Overview ===
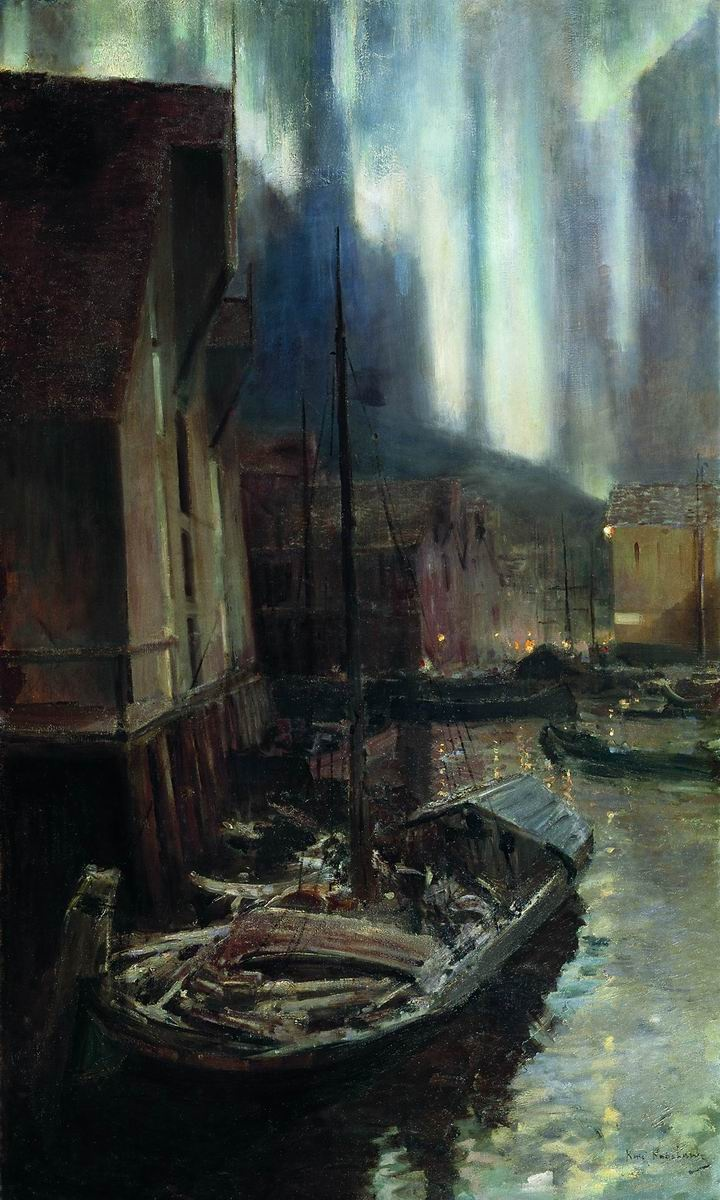
Painting by Konstantin Korovin, inspired by the Aurora Borealis in Hammerfest

Many grave sites dating back to the Stone Age can be found here. This location was an important fishing and Arctic hunting settlement for a long time before it was given market town rights by royal decree of Christian VII of Denmark–Norway in 1789.

- 1684: Hammerfest gets its first church, Hammerfest Church. The population is around 60 people.
- 1764: Russia begins to send ships with grain to Hammerfest as part of the Pomor trade.
- 17 July 1789: Hammerfest receives "town status" as a kjøpstad.
- 1792: The first doctor arrives in Hammerfest.
- 1807–1814: Hammerfest is affected by disease epidemics and food shortages, the latter as a result of the Royal Navy blockade during the Gunboat War.
- 1809: The city is attacked and captured by two British brigs, which proceed to sack it before withdrawing.
- 1839: Hammerfest's first firefighter is employed.
- 1859: The first lighthouse in Finnmark is constructed: Fuglenes Lighthouse.
- 1868: The first water plant in the town is built.
- 1870: A telegraph station, which is used by all of Finnmark, is built.
- 1890: Two-thirds of the city is destroyed by fire.
- 1891: Reconstruction of the city begins. A Methodist chapel is opened.
- 1891: Hammerfest becomes the first town in Norway and Northern Europe with electric streetlights.
- 1940: After the German occupation of Norway the German Navy used the harbor of the city as a base.
- 14 February 1944: A Soviet aircraft bombed the city for the first time, but the damage was small.
- 29 August 1944: A similar, but far more powerful air assault, a number of buildings and streets in the city and ships on the harbour were destroyed. When the Germans retreated, they finalized the destruction.
- November 1944: the Germans began systematically burning all the settlements in Finnmark, including Hammerfest.
- February 1945: citizens are forcibly evacuated by the German authorities. Only one building was left standing, a burial chapel. This was built in 1937 and is the oldest house still existing in the town.
- 1989: Hammerfest celebrates its 200th anniversary as a city.
- 2003: Melkøysund Tunnel is completed connecting the town to the island of Melkøya.
- 2007: The Snøhvit plant on Melkøya becomes operational in September. It is the biggest industrial development in Northern Norway.

=== Napoleonic Wars ===
Denmark–Norway became involved in the Napoleonic Wars in 1807. As one of the main centres of commerce and transportation in western Finnmark, Hammerfest was subject to a Royal Navy blockade. Upon the request of local merchants, the town received four 6-pounder guns from the government armoury in Trondheim. Subsequently, a 50-strong militia unit was formed to defend Hammerfest from potential British attacks. Local merchants formed the militia's officer corps, and Sámi and Kvens served as enlisted members of the unit.

On 22 July 1809, the British brigs HMS Snake and HMS Fancy approached the town. Before reaching Hammerfest, the two vessels had briefly occupied Hasvik. The following battle between Hammerfest's militia, who had built two artillery batteries, and Snake and Fancy was unusually intense and ended after the Norwegians ran out of gunpowder after about 90 minutes of combat and fled. Both Snake and Fancy had suffered a number of cannon hits and lost one man killed, a sailor who was buried at a local cemetery.

During the battle, the town's populace evacuated elsewhere, and the crews of Snake and Fancy remained in Hammerfest for eight days after the Norwegian withdrawal, sacking the empty town before leaving. After the raid, Hammerfest became a garrison town with a detachment of regular troops and improved and expanded fortifications. A small flotilla of gunboats also operated out of Hammerfest for the remainder of the Napoleonic Wars.

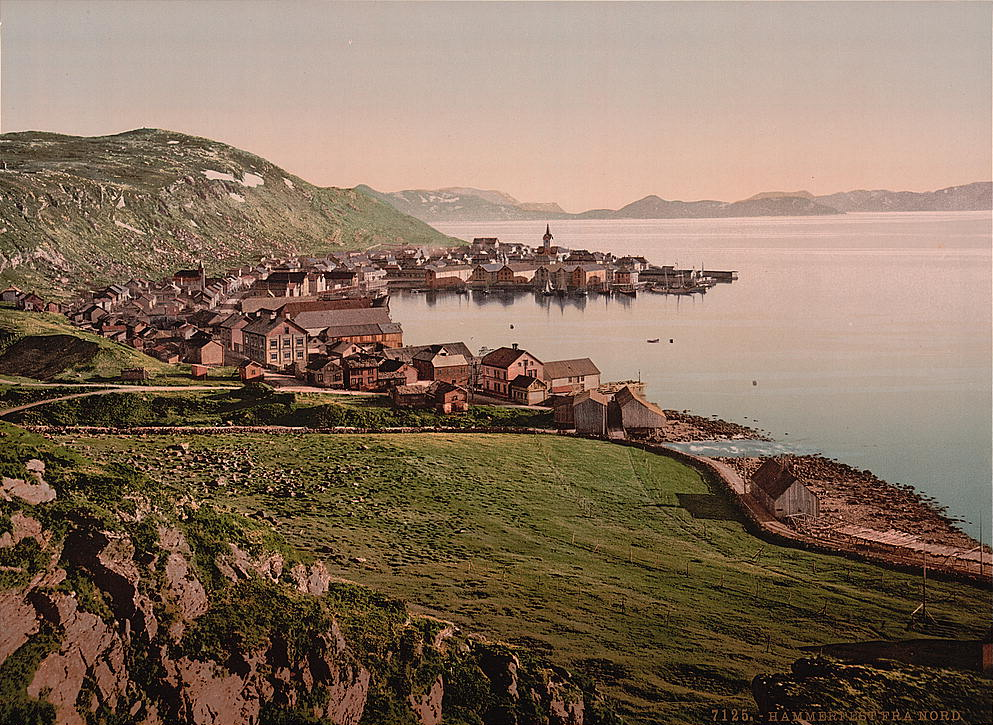
Hammerfest in the late 19th century

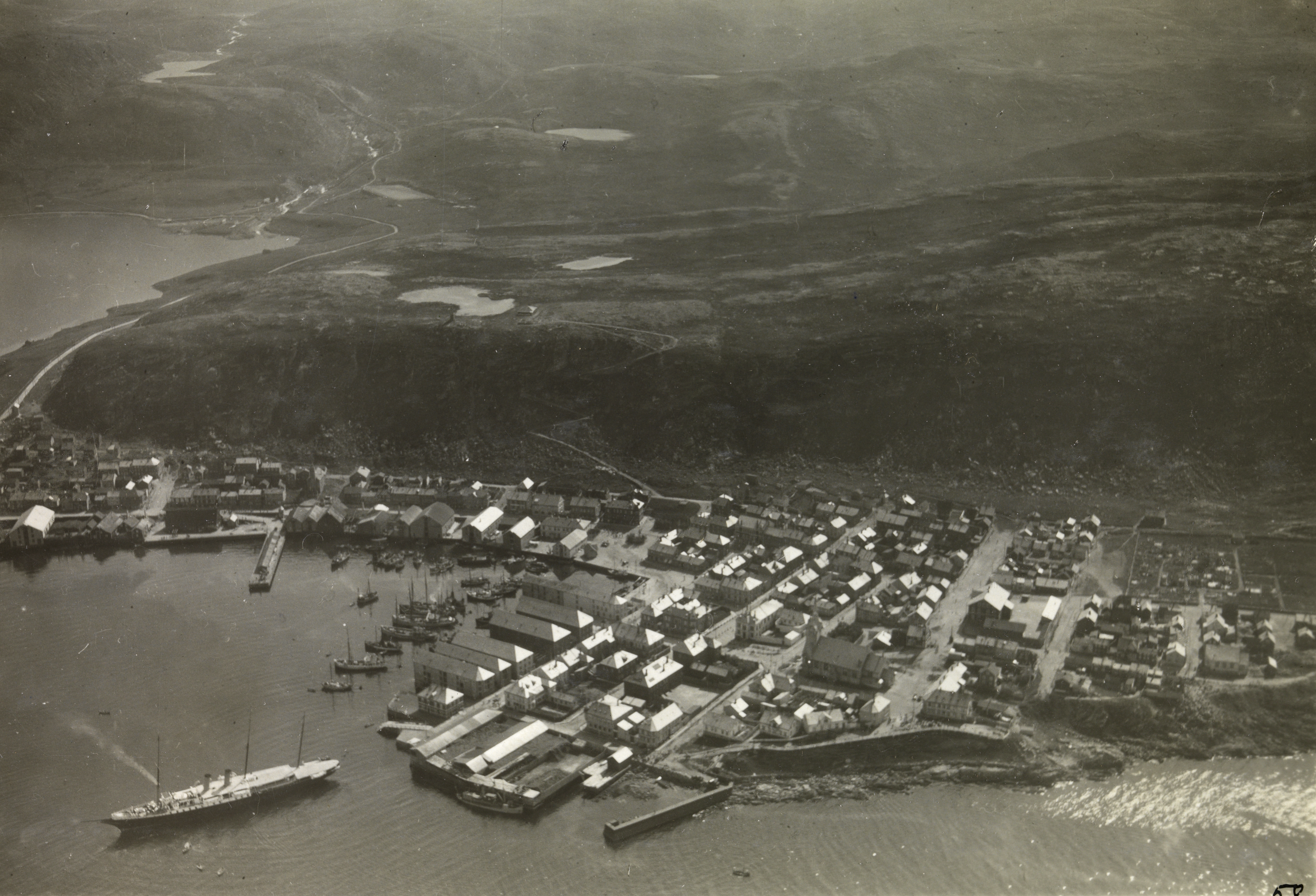
Aerial view of the centre of Hammerfest taken by Walter Mittelholzer in 1923

=== Fire of 1890 ===
Hammerfest was struck by a fire in 1890 which started in a bakery and wiped out almost half the town's houses. After the fire Hammerfest received donations and humanitarian assistance from across the world, with the biggest single donor being Kaiser Wilhelm II of Germany. The Kaiser had personally visited the town several times on his yacht and had great affection for the small northern settlement.

=== Electric street lighting ===
In 1891, Hammerfest became the first urban settlement in Northern Europe to get electrical street lights. The invention was brought to Hammerfest by two of the town's merchants who had seen it demonstrated at a fair in Paris.

=== Destruction in World War II ===
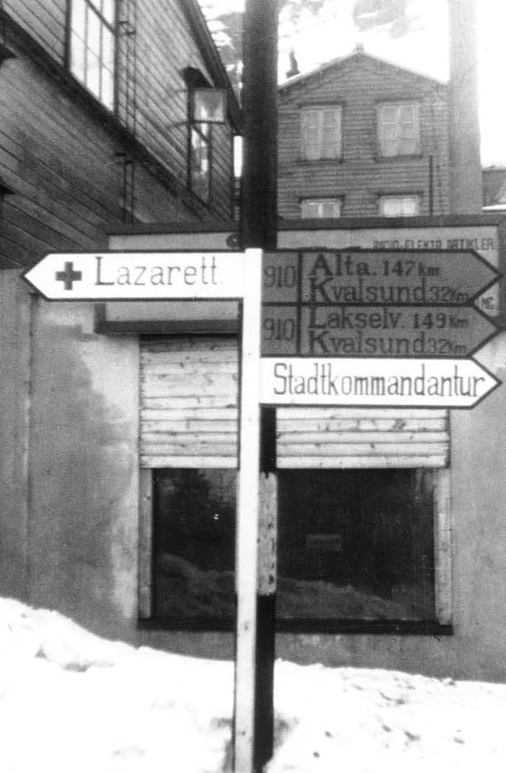
German sign in Hammerfest in 1941.

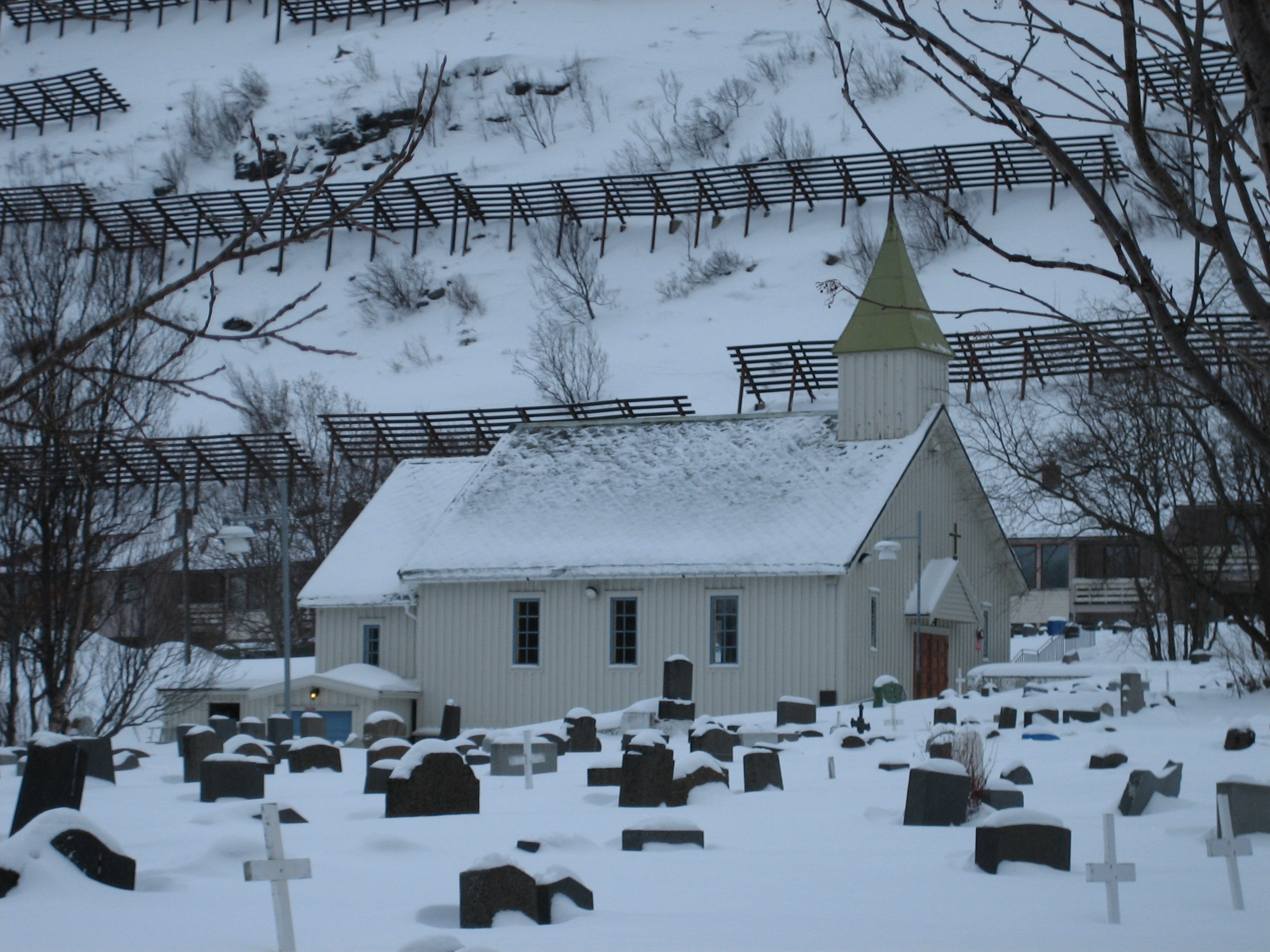
Hauen Chapel, the only building in Hammerfest left standing after the Second World War.

After their victory in the Norwegian Campaign of the Second World War, the Germans soon fortified Hammerfest and used it as a major base. The importance of Hammerfest to the Germans increased dramatically after their invasion of the Soviet Union in 1941. The occupiers installed three coastal batteries in and around Hammerfest, one with four 10.5 cm (4.1 in) guns on Melkøya island near the town, one with three 10.5 cm guns on a hill right outside the town and a final battery with casemated 13 cm (5.1 in) pieces on the Rypklubben peninsula near Rypefjord.

The main German U-boat base in Finnmark was in Hammerfest, serving as a central supply base for the vessels attacking the allied supply convoys to Russia. Luftwaffe seaplanes were based at an improvised naval air station in nearby Rypefjord. The garrison in Hammerfest was also protected by around 4,000 mines and numerous anti-aircraft guns.

During their long retreat following the Petsamo-Kirkenes Operation, the Germans no longer managed to transport troops by sea further east due to intensive Red Air Force raids. Thus Hammerfest became their main shipping port in Finnmark in the autumn of 1944.

The town of Hammerfest was bombed twice by the Soviet Air Forces. The first time, on 14 February 1944, the town was hit by explosive and incendiary devices, but little damage was done. On 29 August 1944 Soviet bombers launched a second airstrike, inflicting significantly more damage to buildings and infrastructure in downtown Hammerfest. Two ships were sunk in the harbour. The ships lost were the local transports Tanahorn and Brynilen.

The population was forcibly evacuated by the occupying German troops in the autumn of 1944 after a Soviet offensive at the northern extremity of the Eastern Front pushed into eastern Finnmark. All of Finnmark including the town was looted and burned to the ground by the Germans when they retreated in 1945, the last of the town having been destroyed by the time the Germans finally left on 10 February 1945. Only the town's small funeral chapel, built in 1937, was left standing. The Museum of Reconstruction in Hammerfest tells the story of these events and the recovery of the region. The Soviet troops in eastern Finnmark were withdrawn in September 1945.

Mines and munitions left over from the Second World War were found and destroyed as late as 2008.

=== Municipal history ===
The municipality called Hammerfest by og landdistrikt was established on 1 January 1838 (see formannskapsdistrikt law). It included the town of Hammerfest and the vast rural district surrounding it. The law required that all towns should be separated from their rural districts, but because of low population, and very few voters, this was impossible to carry out for Hammerfest in 1838. (This was also the case in the other towns in Finnmark: Vadsø and Vardø.) In 1839, the northern district (population: 498) was separated to become the new Maasø Municipality. This left Hammerfest by og landdistrikt with 2,024 residents. On 1 January 1852, Hammerfest was divided. The rural district outside of the town (population: 1,256) became the new municipality of Hammerfest landdistrikt. This left just the town remaining in what was once a vast municipality of Hammerfest. The town at this time had 1,125 residents. (The rural district was later divided into Sørøysund Municipality in the north and Kvalsund Municipality in the south.) On 1 January 1992, the town of Hammerfest (population: 6,909) was merged with the neighboring Sørøysund Municipality (population: 2,341) to form a new, larger Hammerfest Municipality.

== Climate ==
The climate is Dfc (subarctic). It features short, cool summers and long, cold (though mild for its latitude) winters.

Climate data for Hammerfest, 1991–2020 normals, extremes 1957–present (Note: Regarding the temperature data of Hammerfest, the data from 1957 to 1987 was recorded at Hammerfest Radio, and the temperature data from 2002 to the present was recorded at Hammerfest Airport.)
Month	Jan	Feb	Mar	Apr	May	Jun	Jul	Aug	Sep	Oct	Nov	Dec	Year
Record high °C (°F)	8.0 (46.4)	9.3 (48.7)	9.8 (49.6)	12.3 (54.1)	23.9 (75.0)	28.9 (84.0)	29.7 (85.5)	29.3 (84.7)	21.6 (70.9)	18.9 (66.0)	11.8 (53.2)	9.9 (49.8)	29.7 (85.5)
Mean maximum °C (°F)	4.8 (40.6)	4.7 (40.5)	5.1 (41.2)	8.2 (46.8)	15.1 (59.2)	20.3 (68.5)	24.4 (75.9)	22.2 (72.0)	17.1 (62.8)	11.9 (53.4)	7.6 (45.7)	6.2 (43.2)	24.8 (76.6)
Mean daily maximum °C (°F)	−1.3 (29.7)	−1.6 (29.1)	−0.2 (31.6)	3.0 (37.4)	7.3 (45.1)	10.7 (51.3)	15.3 (59.5)	13.9 (57.0)	10.4 (50.7)	5.3 (41.5)	2.4 (36.3)	0.6 (33.1)	5.5 (41.9)
Daily mean °C (°F)	−3.5 (25.7)	−4.0 (24.8)	−2.5 (27.5)	0.1 (32.2)	4.0 (39.2)	7.6 (45.7)	11.3 (52.3)	10.6 (51.1)	7.9 (46.2)	2.9 (37.2)	−0.4 (31.3)	−1.8 (28.8)	2.7 (36.9)
Mean daily minimum °C (°F)	−6.7 (19.9)	−6.9 (19.6)	−5.2 (22.6)	−2.0 (28.4)	1.9 (35.4)	5.2 (41.4)	8.9 (48.0)	8.3 (46.9)	5.7 (42.3)	1.1 (34.0)	−2.4 (27.7)	−4.5 (23.9)	0.3 (32.5)
Mean minimum °C (°F)	−14.1 (6.6)	−13.9 (7.0)	−11.6 (11.1)	−8.4 (16.9)	−3.4 (25.9)	1.1 (34.0)	5.2 (41.4)	4.3 (39.7)	1.3 (34.3)	−5.2 (22.6)	−8.9 (16.0)	−11.0 (12.2)	−16.2 (2.8)
Record low °C (°F)	−23.5 (−10.3)	−23.0 (−9.4)	−21.0 (−5.8)	−16.5 (2.3)	−14.3 (6.3)	−4.3 (24.3)	2.5 (36.5)	0.0 (32.0)	−8.2 (17.2)	−15.0 (5.0)	−18.1 (−0.6)	−20.4 (−4.7)	−23.5 (−10.3)
Average precipitation mm (inches)	71 (2.8)	65 (2.6)	62 (2.4)	60 (2.4)	47 (1.9)	52 (2.0)	56 (2.2)	60 (2.4)	79 (3.1)	93 (3.7)	85 (3.3)	90 (3.5)	820 (32.3)
Average extreme snow depth cm (inches)	74 (29)	92 (36)	105 (41)	103 (41)	70 (28)	9 (3.5)	0 (0)	0 (0)	1 (0.4)	13 (5.1)	28 (11)	54 (21)	126 (50)
Average precipitation days (≥ 1.0 mm)	15	13	13	12	10	12	11	12	15	16	15	16	160
Average relative humidity (%)	76	76	76	75	74	76	77	80	79	80	79	77	77
Average dew point °C (°F)	−7.7 (18.1)	−7.9 (17.8)	−6.2 (20.8)	−3.3 (26.1)	0.2 (32.4)	3.8 (38.8)	7.6 (45.7)	7.1 (44.8)	5.1 (41.2)	0.2 (32.4)	−3.1 (26.4)	−4.9 (23.2)	−0.8 (30.6)
Source 1: Norwegian Meteorological Institute (Note: Extreme snow depth, precipitation and precipitation days 1961-90, dew point and humidity 1991-2020)
Source 2: NOAA WMO averages 1991–2020 Norway Notes

Climate data for Hammerfest 1961–1990, extremes 1957–present
Month	Jan	Feb	Mar	Apr	May	Jun	Jul	Aug	Sep	Oct	Nov	Dec	Year
Record high °C (°F)	8.0 (46.4)	8.1 (46.6)	8.3 (46.9)	12.3 (54.1)	23.4 (74.1)	27.9 (82.2)	29.7 (85.5)	29.3 (84.7)	21.5 (70.7)	18.9 (66.0)	10.0 (50.0)	9.9 (49.8)	29.7 (85.5)
Mean daily maximum °C (°F)	−2.2 (28.0)	−2.1 (28.2)	−1.0 (30.2)	1.3 (34.3)	5.6 (42.1)	11.0 (51.8)	14.7 (58.5)	13.3 (55.9)	8.8 (47.8)	4.1 (39.4)	0.9 (33.6)	−1.1 (30.0)	4.4 (40.0)
Daily mean °C (°F)	−5.2 (22.6)	−5.0 (23.0)	−3.7 (25.3)	−1.0 (30.2)	3.2 (37.8)	7.8 (46.0)	11.3 (52.3)	10.5 (50.9)	6.6 (43.9)	2.0 (35.6)	−1.6 (29.1)	−3.8 (25.2)	1.8 (35.2)
Mean daily minimum °C (°F)	−8.9 (16.0)	−8.8 (16.2)	−7.2 (19.0)	−4.3 (24.3)	0.4 (32.7)	5.2 (41.4)	8.5 (47.3)	7.8 (46.0)	4.1 (39.4)	−0.6 (30.9)	−4.4 (24.1)	−7.1 (19.2)	−1.3 (29.7)
Record low °C (°F)	−23.5 (−10.3)	−23.0 (−9.4)	−21.0 (−5.8)	−16.5 (2.3)	−14.3 (6.3)	−4.3 (24.3)	2.5 (36.5)	0.0 (32.0)	−8.2 (17.2)	−15.0 (5.0)	−18.1 (−0.6)	−20.4 (−4.7)	−23.5 (−10.3)
Average precipitation mm (inches)	71 (2.8)	65 (2.6)	62 (2.4)	60 (2.4)	47 (1.9)	52 (2.0)	56 (2.2)	60 (2.4)	79 (3.1)	93 (3.7)	85 (3.3)	90 (3.5)	820 (32.3)
Source: http://eklima.met.no/

== Media gallery ==
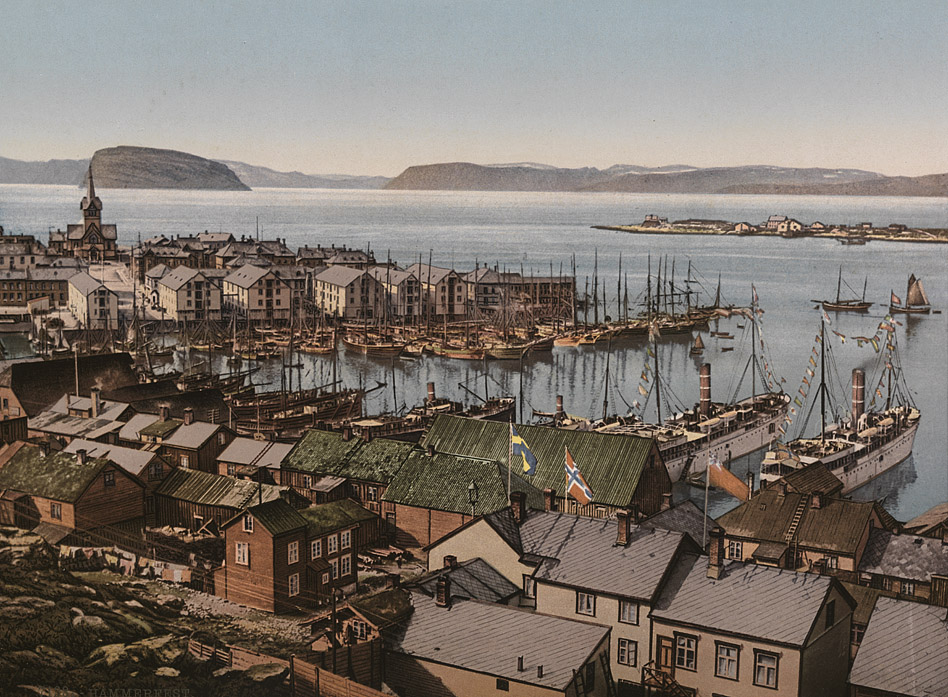

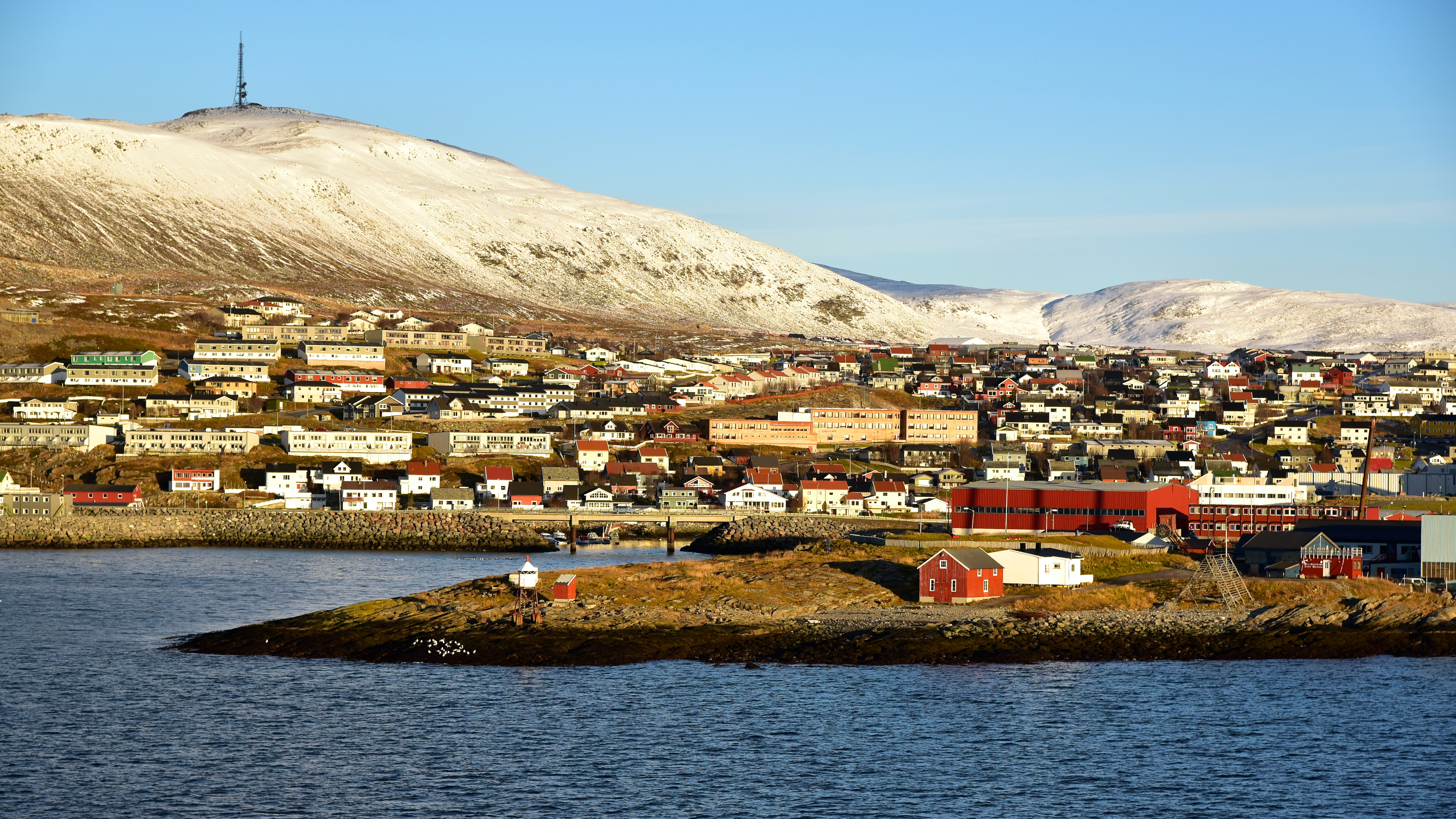

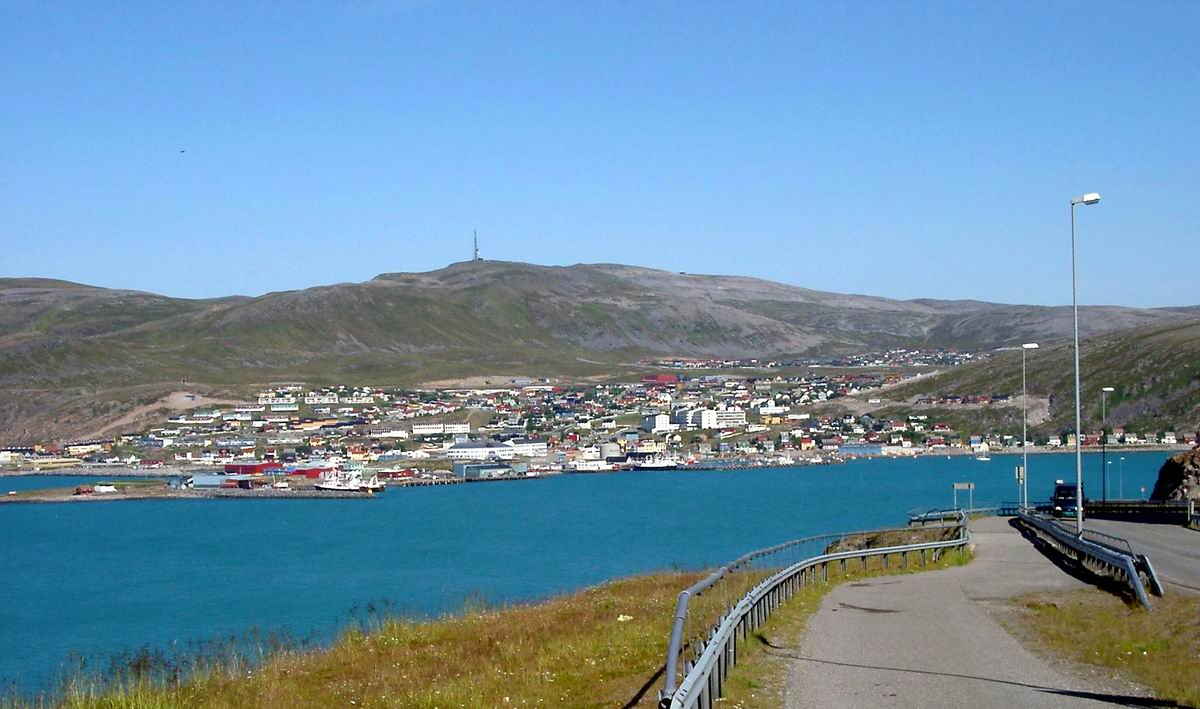

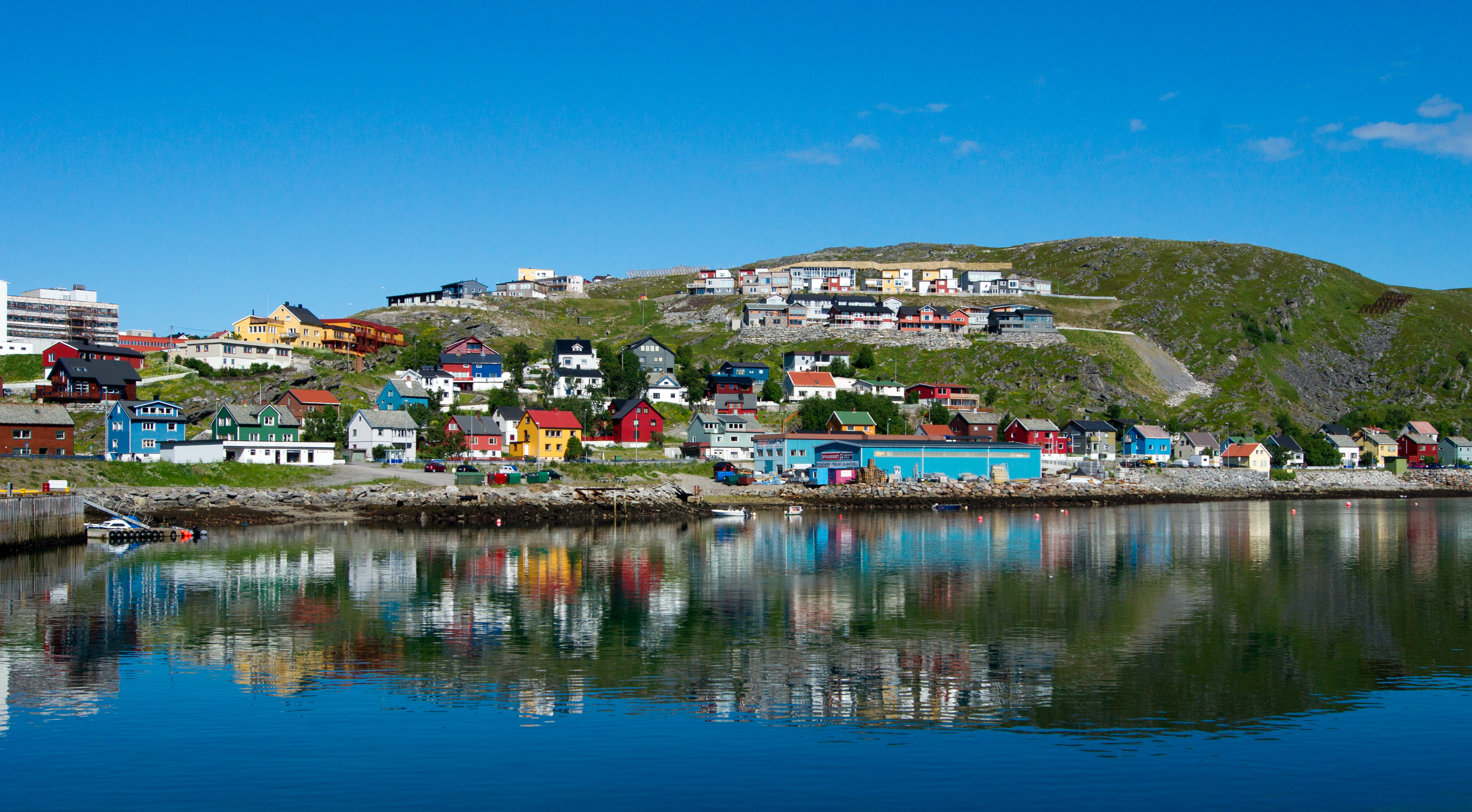

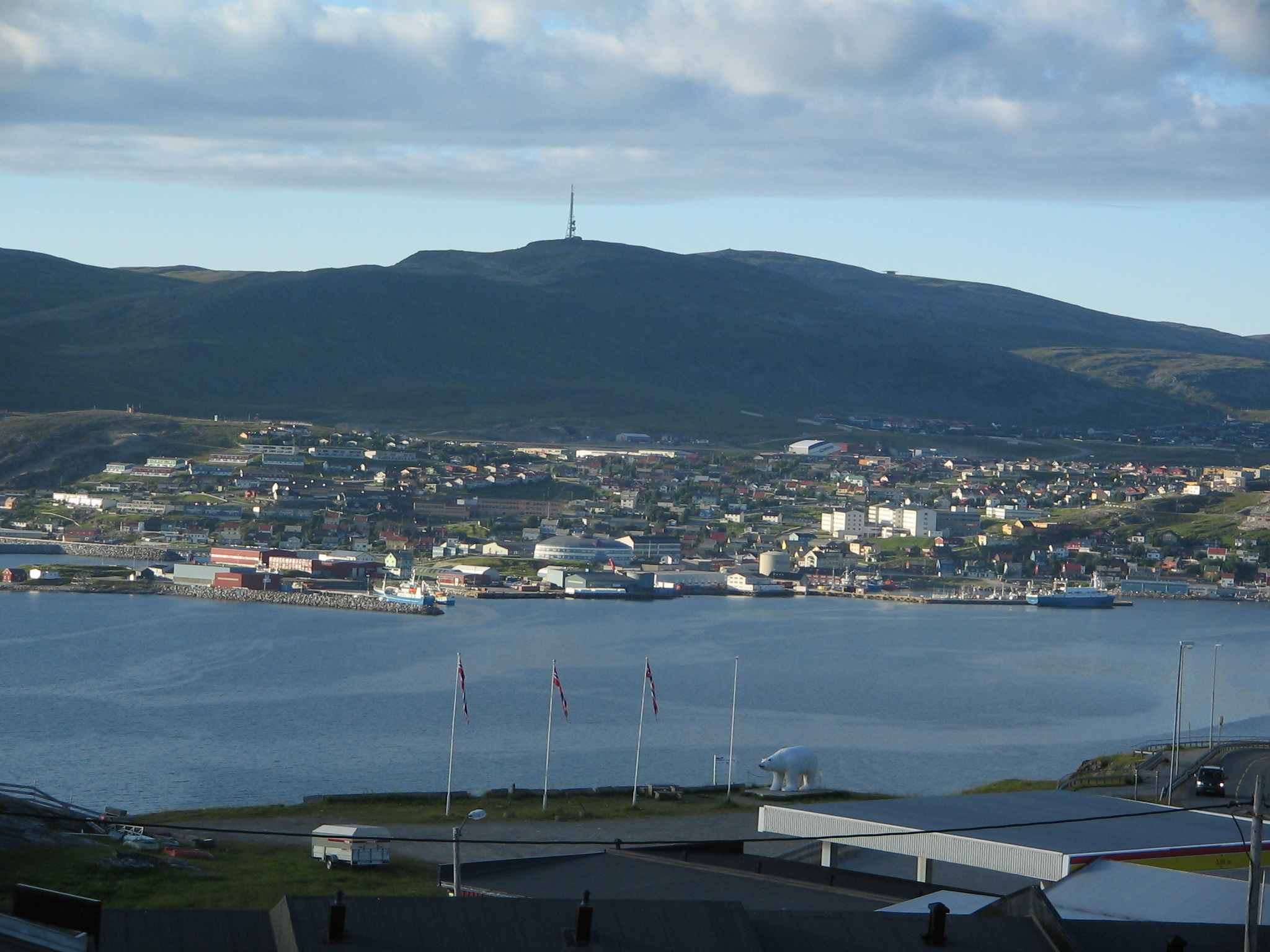

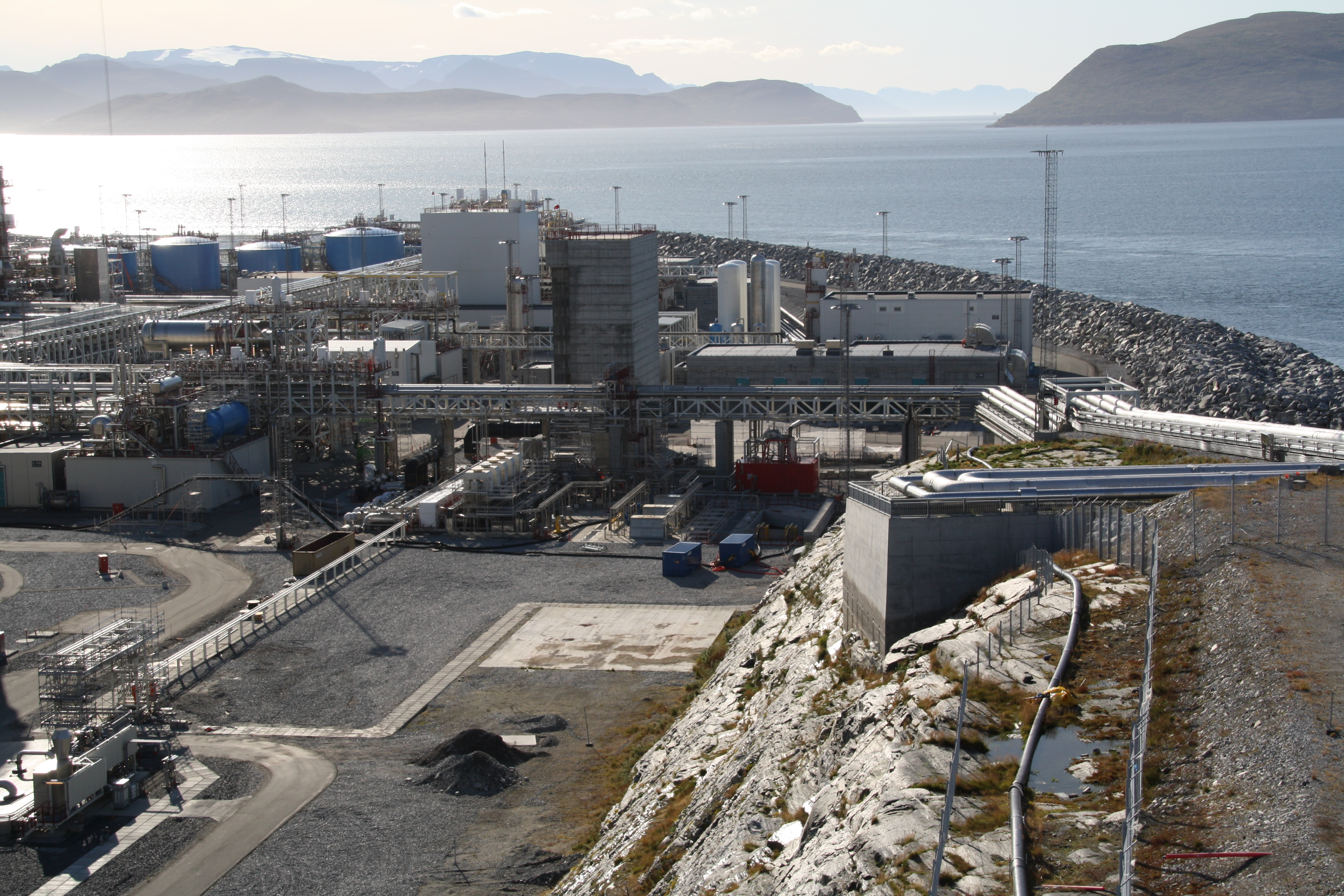

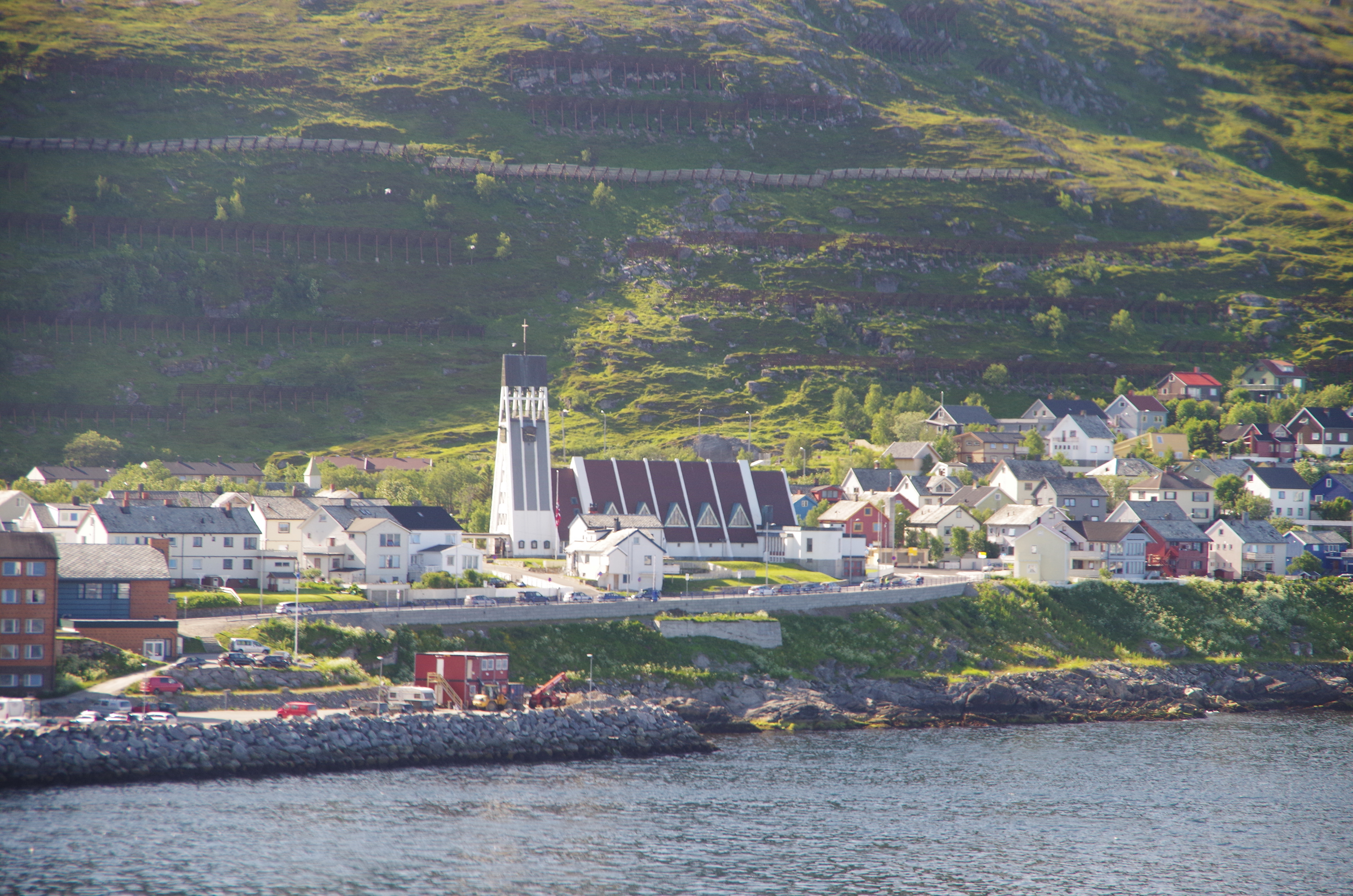

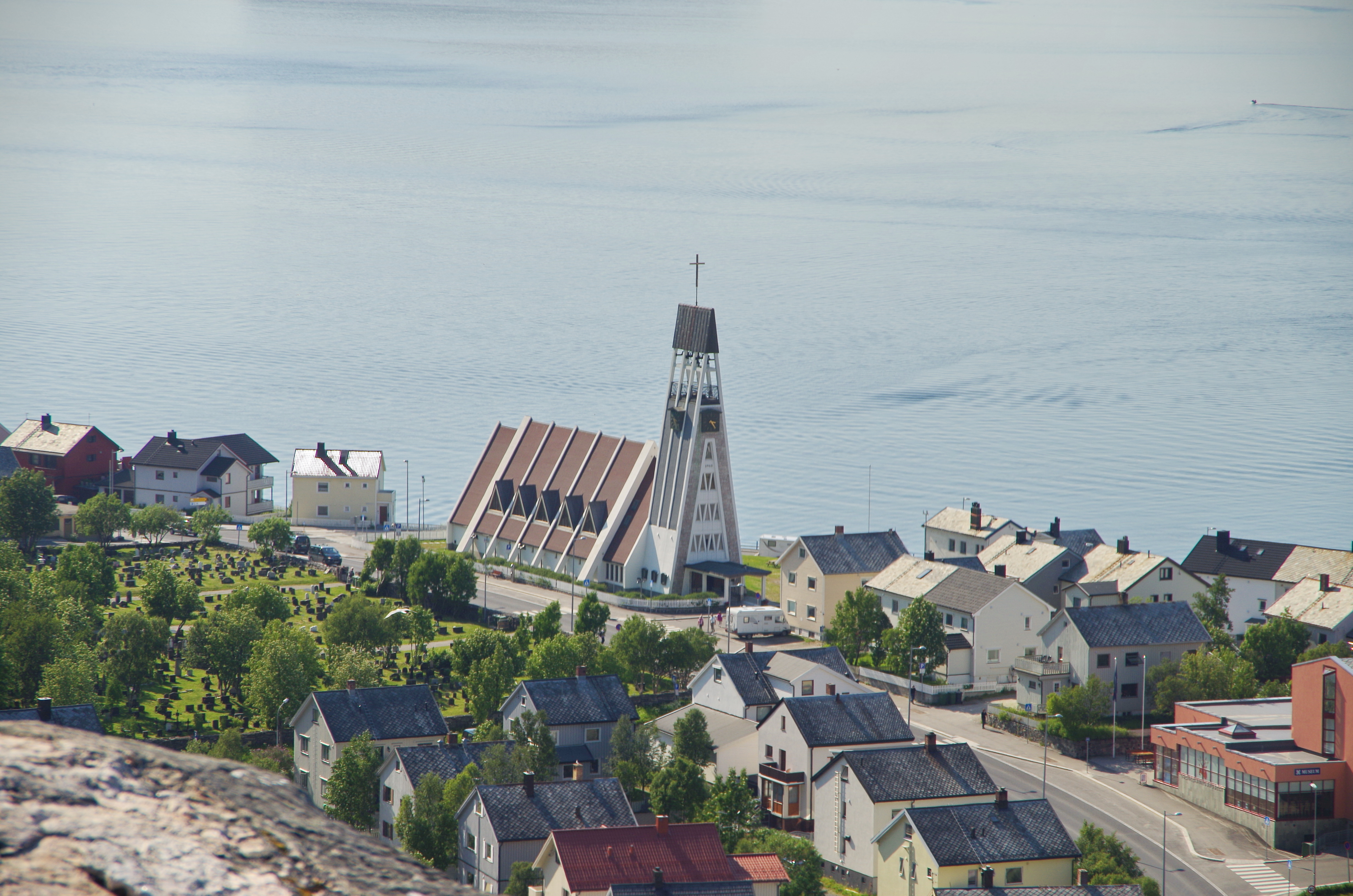

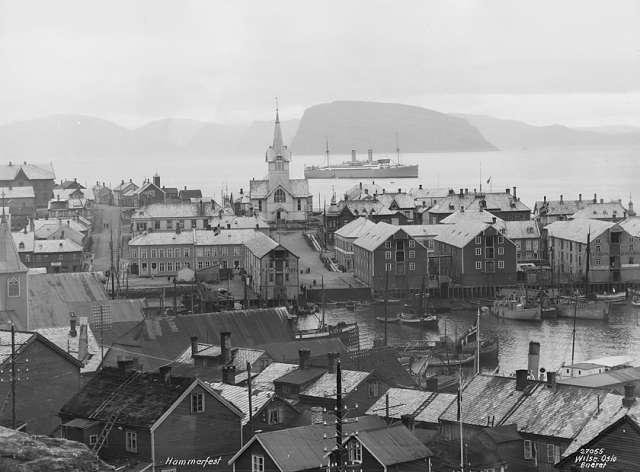
1925

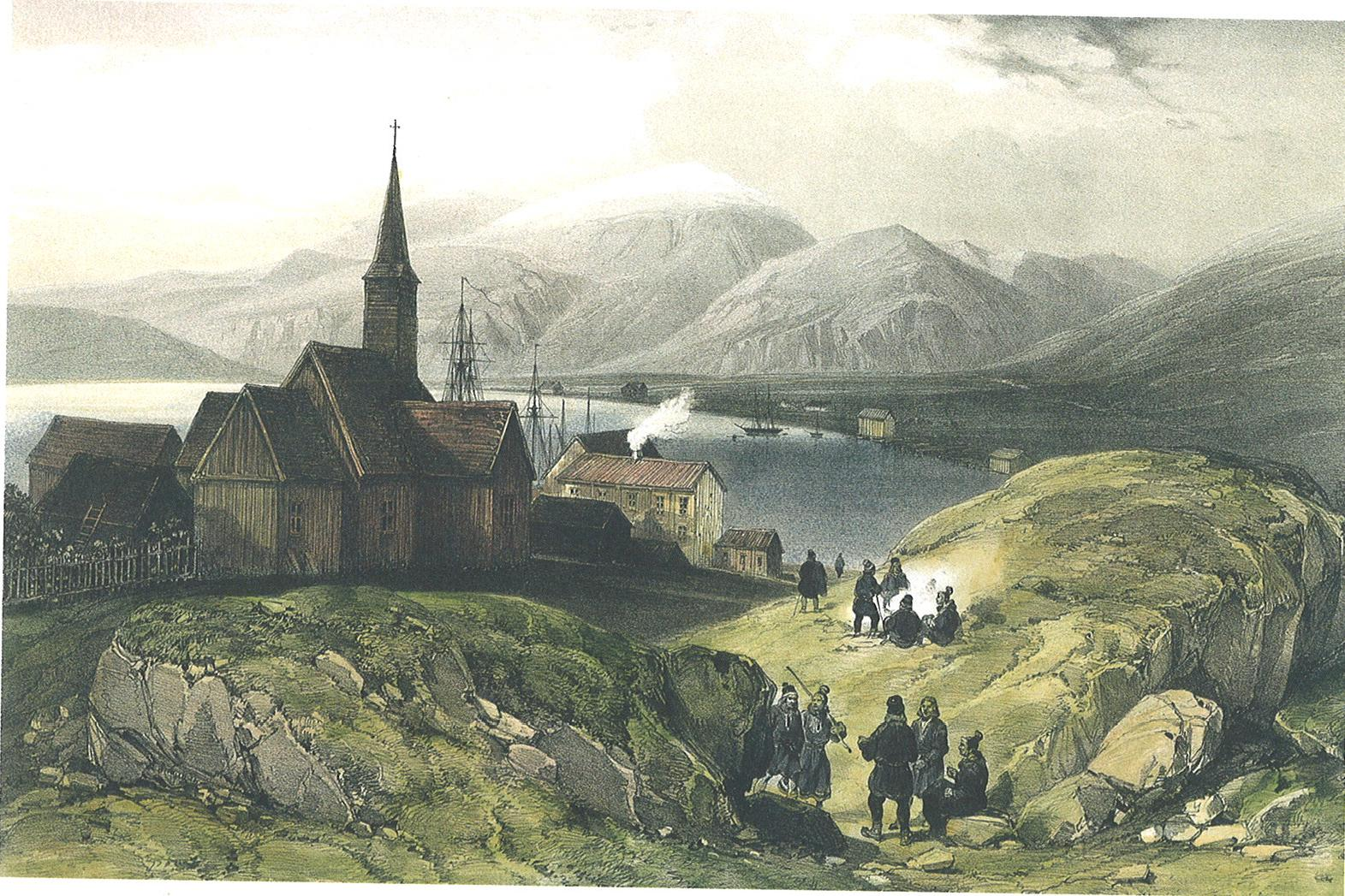
c. 1800

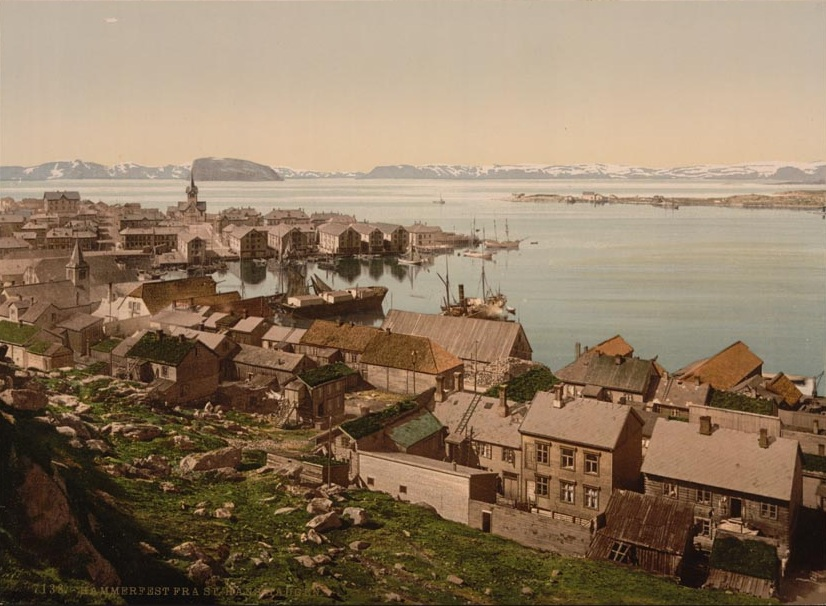
c. 1890–1900

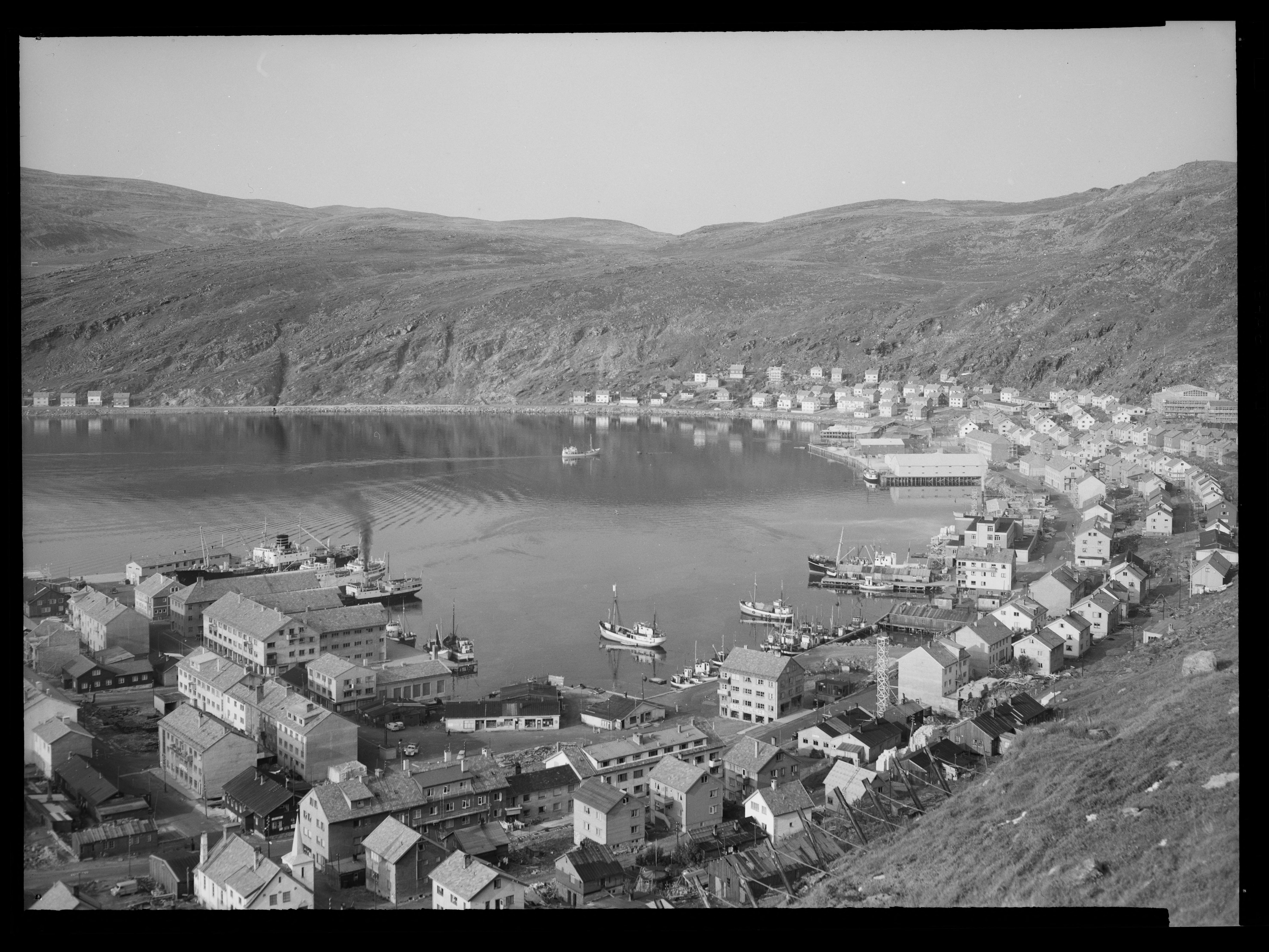
before 1955

== See also ==
- Hvaldimir
- List of towns and cities in Norway
