= Kvalsund (disambiguation) =

Kvalsund or Kvalsundet may refer to:

== Places ==
=== Finnmark county, Norway ===
- Kvalsund Municipality, a former municipality, now part of Hammerfest Municipality
- Kvalsundet, a strait in Hammerfest Municipality
- Kvalsund, Hammerfest, a village in Hammerfest Municipality
- Kvalsund Church, a church in Hammerfest Municipality
- Kvalsund Bridge, a bridge in Hammerfest Municipality

=== Møre og Romsdal county, Norway ===
- Kvalsund (Herøy), a village in Herøy Municipality in Møre og Romsdal county, Norway

=== Troms county, Norway ===
- Kvalsund Tunnel, an undersea tunnel in Tromsø Municipality
- Kvalsundet (Tromsø), a strait in Tromsø Municipality

== Other ==
- Kvalsund ship, an ancient ship which was discovered near Kvalsund in Herøy Municipality in Møre og Romsdal, Norway
