= Kvalsund Municipality =

Former municipality in Finnmark, Norway

Kvalsund Municipality Kvalsund kommune Fálesnuori gielda (Northern Sami) Valasnuoran komuuni (Kven)
- Former municipality
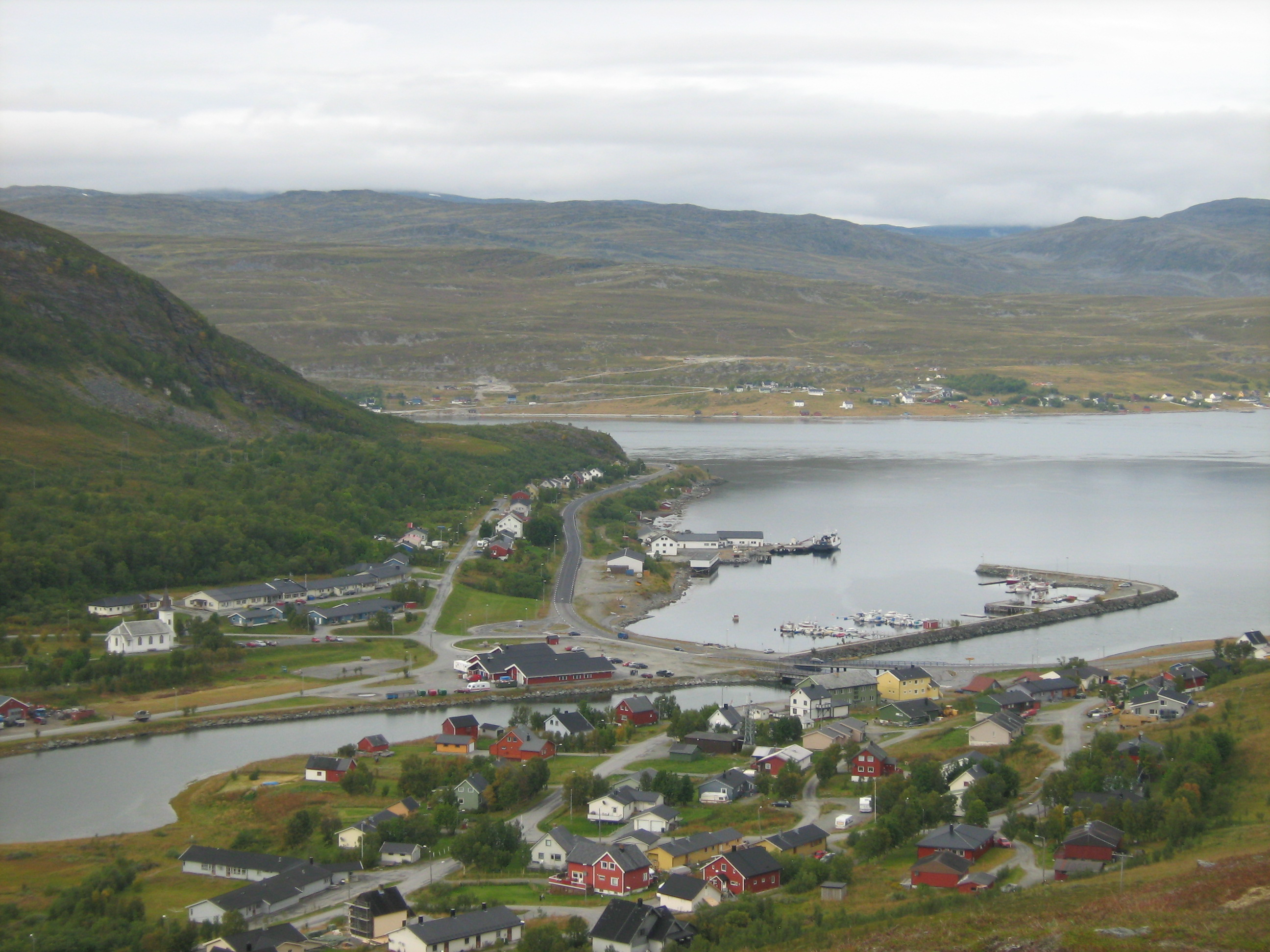
- View of Ráhkkerávju

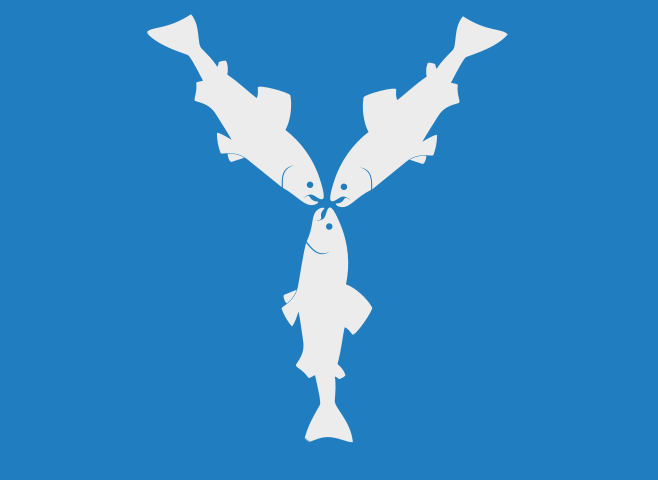
- Flag Coat of arms

- Finnmark within Norway

- Kvalsund within Finnmark
- Coordinates: 70°29′56.3″N 23°58′26.2″E
- Country: Norway
- County: Finnmark
- District: Vest-Finnmark
- Established: 1 July 1869
  - Preceded by: Hammerfest landdistrikt
- Disestablished: 1 Jan 2020
  - Succeeded by: Hammerfest Municipality
- Administrative centre: Kvalsund

Government
  - Mayor (2015-2019): Terje Wikstrøm (Ap)

Area (upon dissolution)
  - Total: 1,844.29 km^{2} (712.08 sq mi)
  - Land: 1,739.35 km^{2} (671.57 sq mi)
  - Water: 104.94 km^{2} (40.52 sq mi) 5.7%
  - Rank: #37 in Norway
- Highest elevation: 986 m (3,235 ft)

Population (2019)
  - Total: 988
  - Rank: #394 in Norway
  - Density: 0.6/km^{2} (1.6/sq mi)
  - Change (10 years): ▼ −5.4%
- Demonym: Kvalsundværing

Official language
  - Norwegian form: Bokmål
- Time zone: UTC+01:00 (CET)
  - Summer (DST): UTC+02:00 (CEST)
- ISO 3166 code: NO-2017

Kvalsund (Northern Sami: Fálesnuorri and Kven: Valasnuora) is a former municipality in Finnmark county in Norway. The area is now part of Hammerfest Municipality. The municipality existed from 1869 until its dissolution in 2020. The administrative centre of the municipality was the village of Kvalsund. Other villages in the municipality included Áisaroaivi, Kokelv, Oldernes, Oldervik, Revsneshamn, Skaidi.

At the time of its dissolution on 1 January 2020, the 1,844-square-kilometre (712 sq mi) municipality was the 37th largest by area out of the 422 municipalities in Norway. Kvalsund was also the 394th most populous municipality in Norway with a population of 988. The municipality's population density was 0.5 inhabitants per square kilometre (1.3/sq mi) and its population had decreased by 5.4% over the previous 10-year period.

The Kvalsund Bridge (Kvalsundbrua) is a suspension bridge that crosses the Kvalsundet strait from the mainland to the island of Kvaløya.

In 2015, the media said that for four years an application has been filed for establishing Norway's largest copper mine, depending on a permit for creating a zone in Repparfjorden for depositing waste from the mine.

== General information ==
The municipality of Kvalsund was established on 1 July 1869 when it was separated from the Hammerfest landdistrikt (the rural municipality surrounding the town of Hammerfest). Initially, Kvalsund had 514 residents. On 1 January 1963, the Kokelv area in southern Måsøy Municipality (population: 34) was transferred to Kvalsund.

On 1 January 2020, Kvalsund Municipality was merged into the neighboring Hammerfest Municipality, a decision that the people of the two municipalities had agreed to in 2017.

=== Name ===
The municipality (originally the parish) is named after the Kvalsundet strait (Old Norse: Hvalsund). The first element comes from the name of the island Kvaløya. The island's name comes form the Old Norse word hvalr which means "whale". The last element is sund which means "strait" or "sound". The Sámi name also translates to "whale strait" (fáles means "whale" and nuorri means strait).

=== Coat of arms ===
The coat of arms was granted on 27 March 1987. The official blazon is "Azure, three salmon argent in pall heads to center" (Norwegian: I blått tre hvite lakser i trepass med hodene innover). This means the arms have a blue field (background) and the charge is three salmon arranged in pall with their heads facing the centre. The salmon have a tincture of argent which means they are commonly colored white, but if it is made out of metal, then silver is used. The blue color in the field and the salmon were chosen to represent fishing in various forms: as a traditional way of living and source of income, as modern fish farming, and as a recreational activity in the area. The arms were designed by Ingunn Bjerkås.

=== Churches ===
The Church of Norway had two parishes (sokn) within Kvalsund Municipality. It was part of the Hammerfest prosti (deanery) in the Diocese of Nord-Hålogaland.

Churches in Kvalsund Municipality
Parish (sokn)	Church name	Location of the church	Year built
Kvalsund	Kvalsund Church	Kvalsund	1936
Kvalsund	Sennalandet Chapel	Áisaroaivi	1961
Kokelv	Kokelv Church	Kokelv	1960

== Culture ==
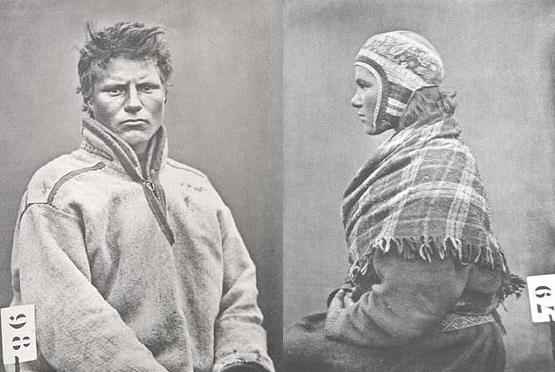
Nicolas Nielsen and Kristin Mikkelsdatter photographed in Kvalsund by ethnographer Roland Bonaparte in 1884

=== Aboriginal culture ===
Until a few hundred years ago, the Coast Sámi culture was completely dominant in Kvalsund. Norwegian and Kven immigration soon made the area multicultural. During Norwegianization much of the traditional culture was lost. Kokelv is the village that has most successfully preserved elements of Sámi culture, and today has a Coast Sámi museum. The gakti of the Kvalsund region is easily recognizable by dots and jags on the collars (for men) and sleeves (for women).

=== Fægstock ===
The municipality hosts an annual rock festival known as Fægstock, which takes place in Fægfjord (Northern Sami: Veaigesvuotna, meaning "twilight fiord").

== Government ==
While it existed, Kvalsund Municipality was responsible for primary education (through 10th grade), outpatient health services, senior citizen services, welfare and other social services, zoning, economic development, and municipal roads and utilities. The municipality was governed by a municipal council of directly elected representatives. The mayor was indirectly elected by a vote of the municipal council. The municipality was under the jurisdiction of the Hålogaland Court of Appeal.

=== Municipal council ===
The municipal council (Kommunestyre) of Kvalsund Municipality was made up of 15 representatives that were elected to four year terms. The tables below show the historical composition of the council by political party.

Kvalsund kommunestyre 2015–2019
Party name (in Norwegian)	Number of representatives
Labour Party (Arbeiderpartiet)	7
Conservative Party (Høyre)	1
Christian Democratic Party (Kristelig Folkeparti)	3
Socialist Left Party (Sosialistisk Venstreparti)	4
Total number of members:	15
Note: On 1 January 2020, Kvalsund Municipality became part of Hammerfest Municipality.

Kvalsund kommunestyre 2011–2015
Party name (in Norwegian)	Number of representatives
Labour Party (Arbeiderpartiet)	10
Conservative Party (Høyre)	2
Socialist Left Party (Sosialistisk Venstreparti)	3
Total number of members:	15

Kvalsund kommunestyre 2007–2011
Party name (in Norwegian)	Number of representatives
Labour Party (Arbeiderpartiet)	6
Christian Democratic Party (Kristelig Folkeparti)	1
Centre Party (Senterpartiet)	2
Socialist Left Party (Sosialistisk Venstreparti)	1
Kvalsund Social Democratic List (Kvalsund Sosialdemokratiske liste)	2
Kvalsund and surroundings (Kvalsund og Omegn bygdelag)	3
Total number of members:	19

Kvalsund kommunestyre 2003–2007
Party name (in Norwegian)	Number of representatives
Labour Party (Arbeiderpartiet)	7
Christian Democratic Party (Kristelig Folkeparti)	1
Centre Party (Senterpartiet)	1
Socialist Left Party (Sosialistisk Venstreparti)	1
Kvalsund Social Democratic List (Kvalsund Sosialdemokratiske liste)	3
Kvalsund and surroundings (Kvalsund og Omegn bygdelag)	2
Total number of members:	19

Kvalsund kommunestyre 1999–2003
Party name (in Norwegian)	Number of representatives
Labour Party (Arbeiderpartiet)	8
Christian Democratic Party (Kristelig Folkeparti)	1
Centre Party (Senterpartiet)	2
Socialist Left Party (Sosialistisk Venstreparti)	1
Kvalsund Social Democratic List (Kvalsund Sosialdemokratiske liste)	5
Kvalsund and surroundings (Kvalsund og Omegn bygdelag)	2
Total number of members:	19

Kvalsund kommunestyre 1995–1999
Party name (in Norwegian)	Number of representatives
Labour Party (Arbeiderpartiet)	8
Christian Democratic Party (Kristelig Folkeparti)	2
Centre Party (Senterpartiet)	7
Socialist Left Party (Sosialistisk Venstreparti)	2
Total number of members:	19

Kvalsund kommunestyre 1991–1995
Party name (in Norwegian)	Number of representatives
Labour Party (Arbeiderpartiet)	8
Christian Democratic Party (Kristelig Folkeparti)	1
Centre Party (Senterpartiet)	5
Socialist Left Party (Sosialistisk Venstreparti)	3
Total number of members:	17

Kvalsund kommunestyre 1987–1991
Party name (in Norwegian)	Number of representatives
Labour Party (Arbeiderpartiet)	9
Conservative Party (Høyre)	1
Christian Democratic Party (Kristelig Folkeparti)	1
Centre Party (Senterpartiet)	3
Socialist Left Party (Sosialistisk Venstreparti)	2
Liberal Party (Venstre)	1
Total number of members:	17

Kvalsund kommunestyre 1983–1987
Party name (in Norwegian)	Number of representatives
Labour Party (Arbeiderpartiet)	12
Conservative Party (Høyre)	1
Christian Democratic Party (Kristelig Folkeparti)	1
Centre Party (Senterpartiet)	2
Liberal Party (Venstre)	1
Total number of members:	17

Kvalsund kommunestyre 1979–1983
Party name (in Norwegian)	Number of representatives
Labour Party (Arbeiderpartiet)	10
Conservative Party (Høyre)	2
Christian Democratic Party (Kristelig Folkeparti)	1
Centre Party (Senterpartiet)	2
Liberal Party (Venstre)	2
Total number of members:	17

Kvalsund kommunestyre 1975–1979
Party name (in Norwegian)	Number of representatives
Labour Party (Arbeiderpartiet)	9
Conservative Party (Høyre)	1
Christian Democratic Party (Kristelig Folkeparti)	2
Centre Party (Senterpartiet)	3
Liberal Party (Venstre)	2
Total number of members:	17

Kvalsund kommunestyre 1971–1975
Party name (in Norwegian)	Number of representatives
Labour Party (Arbeiderpartiet)	12
Conservative Party (Høyre)	1
Christian Democratic Party (Kristelig Folkeparti)	1
Liberal Party (Venstre)	3
Total number of members:	17

Kvalsund kommunestyre 1967–1971
Party name (in Norwegian)	Number of representatives
Labour Party (Arbeiderpartiet)	14
Conservative Party (Høyre)	2
Liberal Party (Venstre)	1
Total number of members:	17

Kvalsund kommunestyre 1963–1967
Party name (in Norwegian)	Number of representatives
Labour Party (Arbeiderpartiet)	14
Conservative Party (Høyre)	2
Liberal Party (Venstre)	1
Total number of members:	17

Kvalsund herredsstyre 1959–1963
Party name (in Norwegian)	Number of representatives
Labour Party (Arbeiderpartiet)	12
Conservative Party (Høyre)	2
Liberal Party (Venstre)	3
Total number of members:	17

Kvalsund herredsstyre 1955–1959
Party name (in Norwegian)	Number of representatives
Labour Party (Arbeiderpartiet)	11
Conservative Party (Høyre)	2
Local List(s) (Lokale lister)	2
Total number of members:	15

Kvalsund herredsstyre 1951–1955
Party name (in Norwegian)	Number of representatives
Labour Party (Arbeiderpartiet)	8
Farmers' Party (Bondepartiet)	1
List of workers, fishermen, and small farmholders (Arbeidere, fiskere, småbrukere liste)	1
Local List(s) (Lokale lister)	2
Total number of members:	12

Kvalsund herredsstyre 1947–1951
Party name (in Norwegian)	Number of representatives
Labour Party (Arbeiderpartiet)	8
Communist Party (Kommunistiske Parti)	2
Local List(s) (Lokale lister)	2
Total number of members:	12

Kvalsund herredsstyre 1945–1947
Party name (in Norwegian)	Number of representatives
Labour Party (Arbeiderpartiet)	8
Communist Party (Kommunistiske Parti)	2
Local List(s) (Lokale lister)	2
Total number of members:	12

Kvalsund herredsstyre 1937–1941*
Party name (in Norwegian)	Number of representatives
Labour Party (Arbeiderpartiet)	7
List of workers, fishermen, and small farmholders (Arbeidere, fiskere, småbrukere liste)	3
Local List(s) (Lokale lister)	2
Total number of members:	12
Note: Due to the German occupation of Norway during World War II, no elections were held for new municipal councils until after the war ended in 1945.

=== Mayors ===
The mayor (Norwegian: ordfører) of Kvalsund Municipality was the political leader of the municipality and the chairperson of the municipal council. The following people have held this position:

- 1869–1870: A. Holmgren
- 1871–1878: Andreas Nørager Buck
- 1879–1882: Peder Nilsen
- 1883–1885: Mathis Abrahamsen
- 1886–1888: Andreas Nørager Buck
- 1889–1892: Martin Nilsen
- 1893–1895: Andreas Nørager Buck
- 1896–1898: Martin Nilsen
- 1899–1901: Karl Svendsen
- 1902–1913: Martin Nilsen
- 1914–1916: Karl Mölbach Buck
- 1917–1919: Johannes Olsen
- 1920–1931: Håkon Pedersen
- 1932–1934: Edvard Skjeldnes
- 1935–1935: S. Indrebø
- 1936–1937: H. Schrøder
- 1945–1947: Arne Bjørnå
- 1948–1955: Ole Mathiasen
- 1956–1959: Hans Arne Arnesen
- 1960–1967: Erling Nilsen
- 1968–1974: Henning Bårdsen
- 1974–1983: Ernst Hokland
- 1984–1991: Egil Johansen
- 1992–1995: Svein-Erik Torbergsen
- 1995–1999: Ragnar Olsen (Ap)
- 1999–2003: Geir Nesse
- 2003–2007: Ragnar Olsen (Ap)
- 2007–2011: Tor Arvid Myrseth (LL)
- 2011–2015: Ragnar Olsen (Ap)
- 2015–2019: Terje Wikstrøm (Ap)

== Geography ==
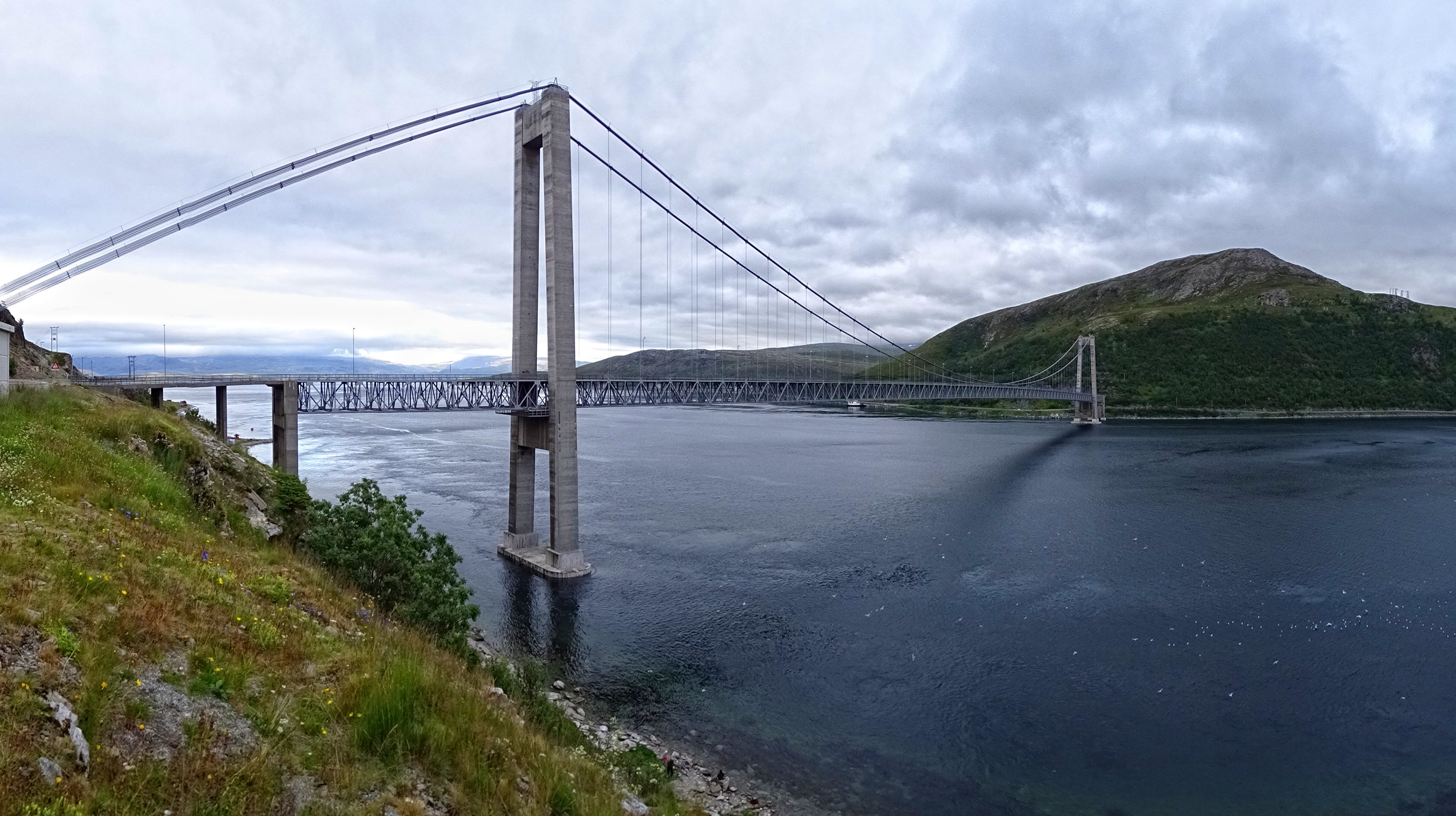
View of the Kvalsund Bridge

The municipality was mostly located on the mainland, but parts of the municipality were also located on the islands of Kvaløya and Seiland. The Seilandsjøkelen glacier was partially located in Kvalsund, and at 986 metres (3,235 ft) in height, it was the highest point in the municipality. Lakes in the municipality included Bjørnstadvatnet and Doggejávri.

=== Settlements ===
The main village in the municipality was called Kvalsund in Norwegian and Ráhkkerávju in Sámi. Historically, that village was called Finnbyen, a name meaning simply "Coast Sámi settlement". Most villages in the municipality had two names: one in Norwegian and one in Sami. Other villages in the municipality included Skáidi ("meeting-place of rivers" in Sámi); Stállugárgu/Stallogargo ("troll beach"); Neverfjord/Návvuotna; and Kokelv/Guoikejohka. Regarding the latter toponyms, the Neverfjord translates to "tinder fjord" and Návvuotna to "cowshed fjord"; while Kokelv is "boiling river" in Norwegian and Guiokejohka means "rushing river" in the Sámi language.

=== Birdlife ===
The municipality of Kvalsund had several localities that had a rich and varied bird fauna. One of these was Repparfjordbotn with its large colony of Arctic terns and its autumn numbers of goosander.

=== Climate ===
Kvalsund has continental subarctic climate. The Köppen Climate Classification subtype for this climate is "Dfc".

Climate data for Kvalsund
Month	Jan	Feb	Mar	Apr	May	Jun	Jul	Aug	Sep	Oct	Nov	Dec	Year
Mean daily maximum °C (°F)	−4 (25)	−4 (25)	−2 (28)	2 (36)	6 (43)	11 (52)	14 (57)	13 (55)	9 (48)	4 (39)	0 (32)	−2 (28)	4 (39)
Daily mean °C (°F)	−6 (21)	−6 (21)	−4 (25)	−1 (30)	4 (39)	8 (46)	12 (54)	11 (52)	7 (45)	2 (36)	−3 (27)	−5 (23)	2 (35)
Mean daily minimum °C (°F)	−8 (18)	−8 (18)	−7 (19)	−3 (27)	1 (34)	6 (43)	9 (48)	8 (46)	4 (39)	0 (32)	−5 (23)	−7 (19)	−1 (31)
Average rainfall mm (inches)	11 (0.4)	11 (0.4)	10 (0.4)	16 (0.6)	35 (1.4)	55 (2.2)	61 (2.4)	55 (2.2)	51 (2.0)	50 (2.0)	23 (0.9)	14 (0.6)	392 (15.5)
Average snowfall mm (inches)	302 (11.9)	281 (11.1)	229 (9.0)	165 (6.5)	32 (1.3)	1 (0.0)	0 (0)	0 (0)	4 (0.2)	109 (4.3)	233 (9.2)	301 (11.9)	1,657 (65.4)
Average precipitation days (≥ 1 mm)	10	9	8	8	9	10	10	9	10	13	10	11	117
Average rainy days (≥ 1 mm)	1	1	2	3	7	10	10	9	10	9	3	2	67
Average snowy days (≥ 1 mm)	7	6	5	3	1	0	0	0	0	2	5	7	36
Mean daily daylight hours	1.2	7.1	11.8	16.6	22.7	24	23.9	18.3	13.3	8.7	2.8	0	12.5
Average ultraviolet index	2	1	1	2	2	3	4	3	2	1	1	2	2

== See also ==
- List of former municipalities of Norway
