= Russelva =

Russelva Ruoššajohka (Northern Sami)
- Interactive map of the river

Location
- Country: Norway
- County: Finnmark
- Municipalities: Hammerfest and Porsanger

Physical characteristics
- Source: Confluence of Tverrusselv and Miessejohka rivers
  - location: Tverrusselv Bridge, Porsanger Municipality
  - coordinates: 70.54813°N 24.8756°E
  - elevation: 89 metres (292 ft)
- Mouth: Revsbotn fjord
  - location: Kokelv, Hammerfest Municipality
  - coordinates: 70.61847°N 24.6590°E
  - elevation: 0 metres (0 ft)
- Length: 12 km (7.5 mi)

Russelva (Northern Sami: Ruoššajohka) is a 12-kilometre (7.5 mi) long river in Finnmark county, Norway. The river lies almost entirely in the Kvalsund area of Hammerfest Municipality, but the first 60 metres (200 ft) or so of the river lies in Porsanger Municipality. The river begins near the Tverrusselv Bridge at the confluence of two rivers: Tverrusselv and Miessejohka. The river then flows to the north-northwest before empyting into the Revsbotn fjord at the village of Kokelv.

== See also ==
- List of rivers in Norway
