= Nordmannsjøkelen =

Glacier in Finnmark, Norway

Nordmannsjøkelen (Norwegian); Dáččavuonjiehkki (Northern Sami)
- Interactive map of: Nordmannsjøkelen (Norwegian); Dáččavuonjiehkki (Northern Sami)
- Location: Finnmark, Norway
- Coordinates: 70.45402°N 23.08397°E
- Area: close to zero

Nordmannsjøkelen (Norwegian) or Dáččavuonjiehkki (Northern Sami) is a glacier in Finnmark county, Norway. The glacier is located on the island of Seiland in both Alta Municipality and Hammerfest Municipality. It is located within the Seiland National Park. The glacier surrounds the mountain of Seilandstuva, which is the highest peak of the island, and the highest peak in Hammerfest Municipality. As of 2026, it is almost gone.
