= Vargsundet =

Strait in Finnmark county, Norway

Vargsundet (Norwegian); Várggonuorri (Northern Sami)
- Interactive map of the strait
- Location: Finnmark county, Norway
- Coordinates: 70.36°N 23.49°E
- Type: Strait
- Basin countries: Norway
- Max. length: 30 kilometres (19 mi)

Vargsundet (Norwegian) or Várggonuorri (Northern Sami) is a strait in Hammerfest Municipality and Alta Municipality in Finnmark county, Norway. It separates the island of Seiland from the mainland. Vargsundet opens up into Altafjorden to the southwest, and to Straumen to the northeast. The river Porsa debouches into the strait, from southeast.
