= Lille Kufjorden =

Fjord in Alta, Norway

Lille Kufjorden (Norwegian)
- Unna Vuođđovuonaš (Northern Sami)
- Interactive map of the fjord
- Location: Finnmark county, Norway
- Coordinates: 70.3530°N 22.9704°E
- Type: Fjord
- Basin countries: Norway
- Max. length: 2 kilometres (1.2 mi)
- Max. depth: 81 metres (266 ft)

Lille Kufjorden (Norwegian) or Unna Vuođđovuonaš (Northern Sami) is a fjord on the south side of the island of Seiland in Alta Municipality, Finnmark county, Norway. The fjord is about 2 kilometres (1.2 mi) long, emptying into the Rognsundet strait on the south end of the fjord.

The mouth of the fjord is between Junkerhamnklubben to the west and Klubben to the east. Junkerhamn is a tiny farm the same size as the Junkerhamnklubben peninsula. Other than that one farm, there are no settlements around the fjord. The fjord is 81 metres (266 ft) at its deepest point (at the mouth of the fjord, near Klubben). The fjord sits a few kilometres south of Seiland National Park.

== See also ==
- List of Norwegian fjords
