= Porsa (river) =

River in Finnmark county, Norway

Coordinates: 70.3995°N 23.6161°E

Porsa is a river in Hammerfest Municipality in Finnmark county, Norway. The river drains and area of 85 square kilometres (33 sq mi) and flows into the Vargsundet strait. Two hydroelectric power stations, Nedre and Øvre Porsa, are located in the river, with a total installed capacity of 15.3 megawatts (20,500 hp).
