= Seilandsjøkelen =

Glacier in Finnmark, Norway

Seilandsjøkelen (Norwegian); Nuortageašjiehkki (Northern Sami)
- Interactive map of: Seilandsjøkelen (Norwegian); Nuortageašjiehkki (Northern Sami)
- Location: Finnmark, Norway
- Coordinates: 70°25′08″N 23°13′40″E
- Area: 14 km^{2} (5.4 sq mi)

Seilandsjøkelen (Norwegian) or Nuortageašjiehkki (Northern Sami) is a glacier that is located on the island of Seiland in Finnmark county, Norway. The 14-square-kilometre (5.4 sq mi) glacier is located in the municipalities of Hammerfest and Alta. The glacier is located inside Seiland National Park, about 5 kilometres (3.1 mi) southeast of the mountain Seilandstuva.

== Location and topography ==
Seilandsjøkelen is a glacier located in the eastern part of Seiland National Park in Finnmark, northern Norway. It lies near the administrative boundaries of Alta, Hammerfest, and the former Kvalsund Municipality. The glacier occupies the central highland plateau of the island of Seiland, surrounded by rugged mountain ridges and steep valleys. The surrounding terrain includes extensive blockfields, glacial cirques, and a number of high-elevation lakes. According to a vegetation and fauna survey commissioned by the Seiland National Park board in 2019, the area immediately east of Seilandsjøkelen consists of large expanses of rocky, windswept uplands interspersed with patches of snowbed and wetland vegetation.

== Ecological importance ==
The glacier and its adjacent uplands support a variety of high-mountain ecosystems, several of which are listed as threatened in the Norwegian Red List for habitat types. These include snowbed communities—snøleie (late-melting depressions with cold-adapted vegetation), snøleieberg (sparsely vegetated rocky slopes retaining snow), and våtsnøleie (snowbed areas fed by prolonged meltwater seepage)—as well as extensive blockfields (blokkmark) characteristic of periglacial environments. The report identified numerous occurrences of red-listed vascular plants in these habitats, such as issoleie (Ranunculus glacialis) and snøsoleie (Ranunculus nivalis), both of which are indicative of cold, moist, late-melting areas. Lichen-rich outcrops and moist moss-dominated slopes in the vicinity of Seilandsjøkelen also support rare species including grannsildre (Saxifraga tenuis) and alpine forms of Alectoria and Cladonia. These habitats form an important ecological refuge for alpine flora and fauna, especially as similar environments decline elsewhere in the region.

== Climate and environmental threats ==
The habitats surrounding Seilandsjøkelen are considered vulnerable to climate change, particularly due to the upward migration of the tree line and reduced duration of snow cover. The glacier itself is classified as part of the "snow and ice" habitat type, which is listed as near threatened in Norway. Rising temperatures are expected to accelerate glacial retreat, reduce snowpack, and disrupt the hydrology of meltwater-fed systems. The report suggests that some red-listed plant species may find temporary refuge in these cold, high-elevation zones, but long-term viability is uncertain. Moreover, changes in snowmelt patterns may reduce the extent and persistence of moisture-dependent ecosystems such as våtsnøleie (a specific type of snowbed habitat) and alpine springs (snøleiekilde), which are already limited in extent.
