= Indre Eidsfjord Church =

Church in Nordland, Norway

- Indre Eidsfjord kirke
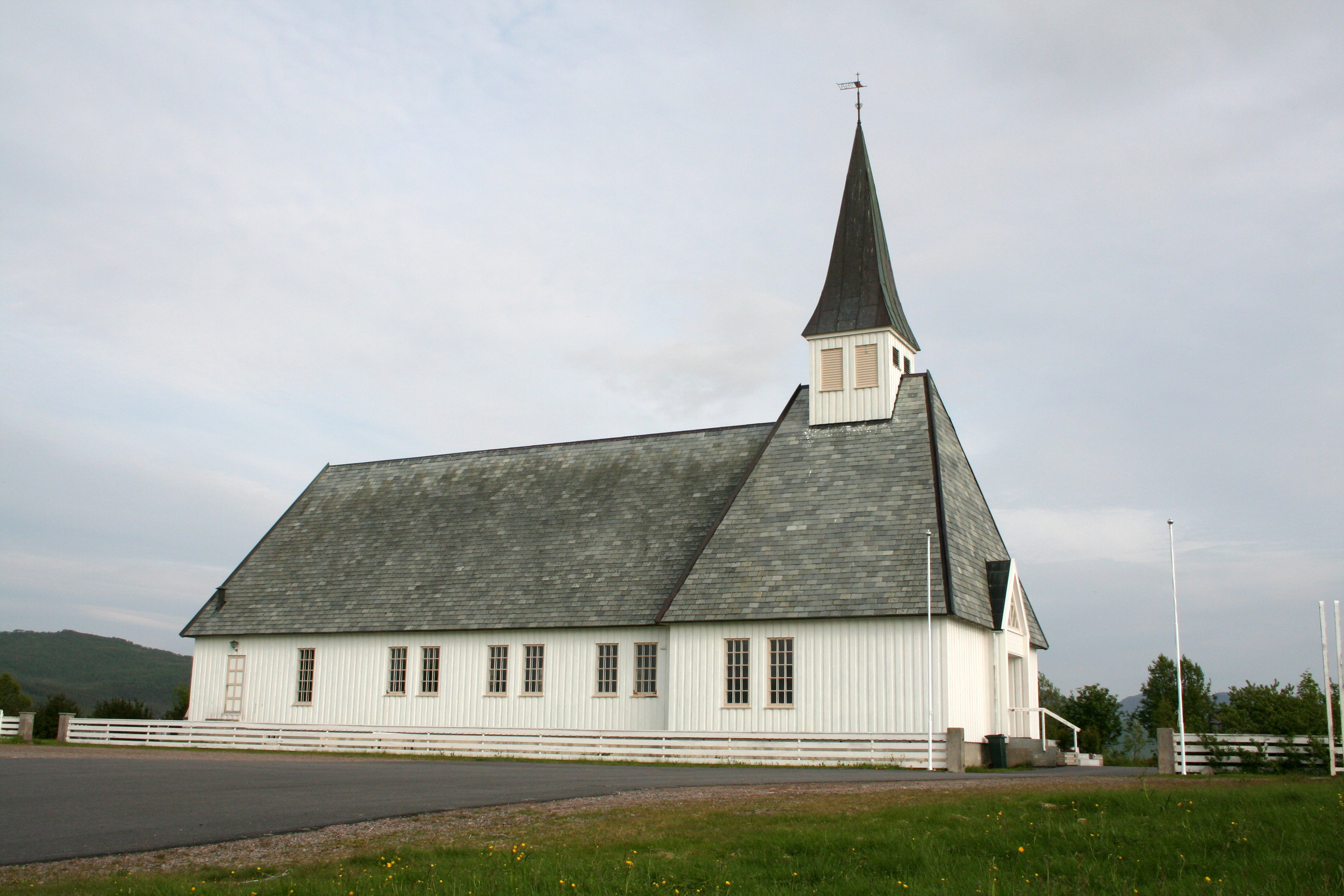
- View of the church
- Indre Eidsfjord Church
- 68.7270549°N 15.1519328°E
- Location: Sortland Municipality, Nordland
- Country: Norway
- Denomination: Church of Norway
- Churchmanship: Evangelical Lutheran

History
- Status: Parish church
- Founded: 1970
- Consecrated: 14 June 1970

Architecture
- Functional status: Active
- Architect: Rolf Harlew Jenssen
- Architectural type: Long church
- Completed: 1970 (56 years ago)

Specifications
- Capacity: 280
- Materials: Wood

Administration
- Diocese: Sør-Hålogaland
- Deanery: Vesterålen prosti
- Parish: Sortland
- Norwegian Cultural Heritage Site
- Type: Church
- Status: Not protected
- ID: 84716

Indre Eidsfjord Church (Norwegian: Indre Eidsfjord kirke) is a parish church of the Church of Norway in Sortland Municipality in Nordland county, Norway. The church is located in the village of Holmstad on the island of Langøya. The church is one of the three churches for the Sortland parish which is part of the Vesterålen prosti (deanery) in the Diocese of Sør-Hålogaland. The white, wooden church was built in a long church style in 1970 using plans drawn up by the architect Rolf Harlew Jenssen. The church seats about 280 people. It was consecrated on 14 June 1970.

== See also ==
- List of churches in Sør-Hålogaland
