= Masi Church =

- Masi kirke
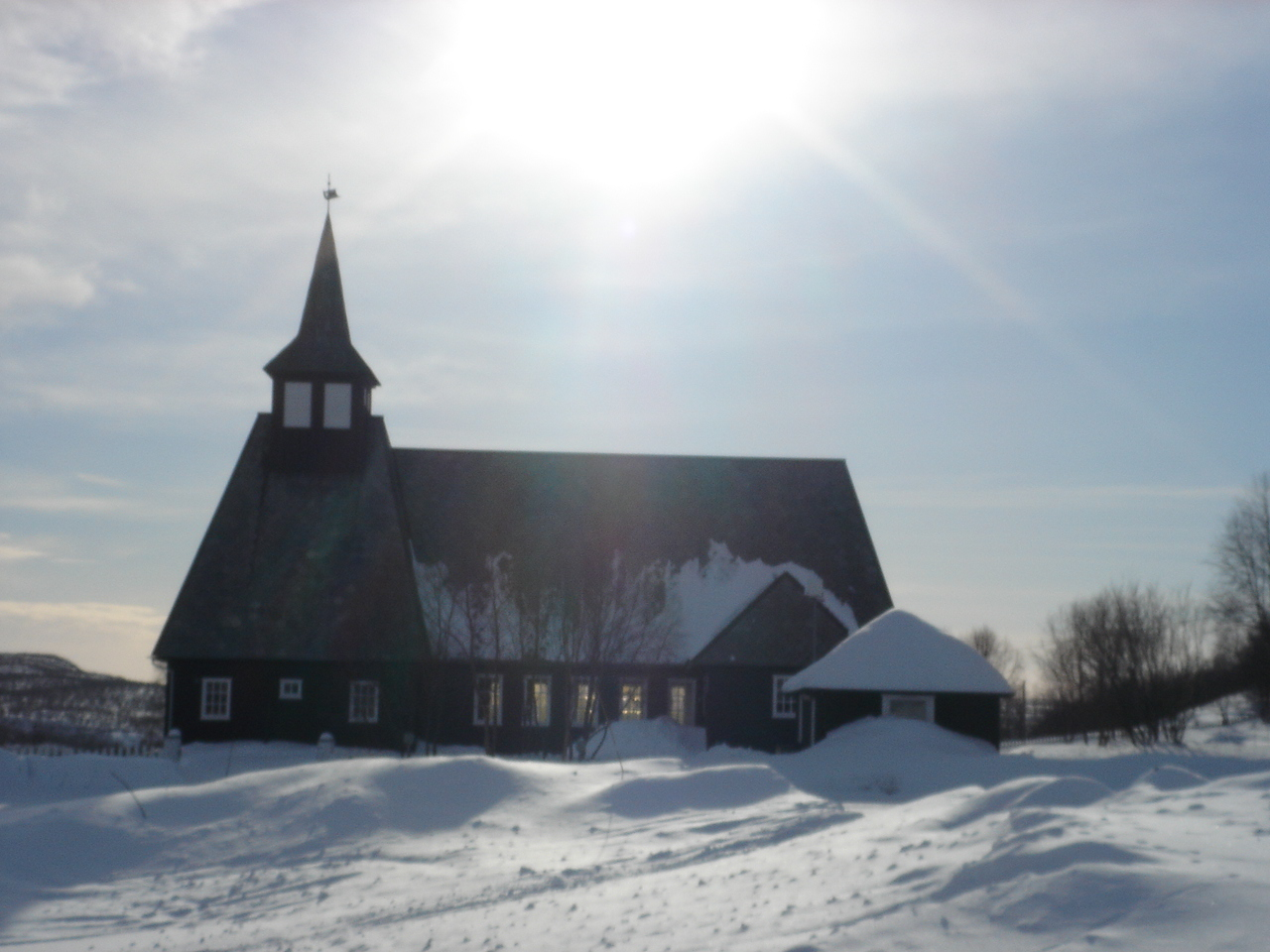
- View of the church
- Masi Church
- 69.443607°N 23.665784°E
- Location: Kautokeino Municipality, Finnmark
- Country: Norway
- Denomination: Church of Norway
- Churchmanship: Evangelical Lutheran

History
- Status: Parish church
- Founded: 1729
- Consecrated: 1965

Architecture
- Functional status: Active
- Architect: Rolf Harlew Jenssen
- Architectural type: Rectangular
- Completed: 1965 (61 years ago)

Specifications
- Capacity: 150
- Materials: Wood

Administration
- Diocese: Nord-Hålogaland
- Deanery: Indre Finnmark prosti
- Parish: Kautokeino
- Norwegian Cultural Heritage Site
- Type: Church
- Status: Not protected
- ID: 84405

Masi Church (Norwegian: Masi kirke) is a parish church of the Church of Norway in Kautokeino Municipality in Finnmark county, Norway. It is located in the village of Masi. It is one of the churches for the Kautokeino parish which is part of the Indre Finnmark prosti (deanery) in the Diocese of Nord-Hålogaland. The brown, wooden church was built in a rectangular style in 1965 using plans drawn up by the architect Rolf Harlew Jenssen. The church seats about 150 people.

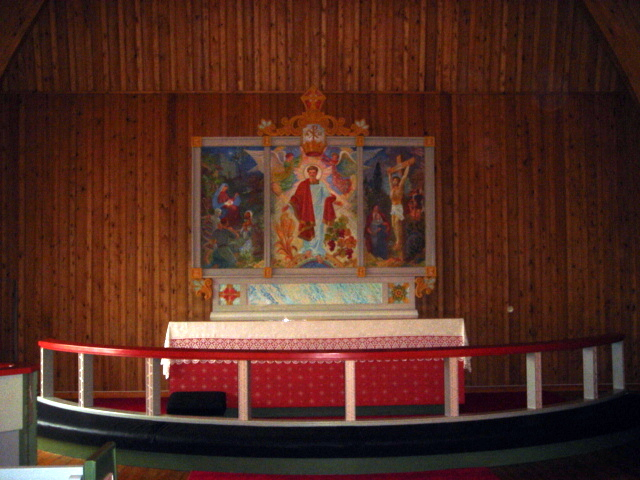
View of the altar

== History ==
The first chapel in Masi was built in 1729 by Thomas von Westen to serve and evangelize the local Sami people. The first building here was an annex chapel under the Talvik Church parish. This church was about 12 by 12 metres (39 ft × 39 ft) and its ceiling height was just under 2 metres (6.6 ft). The chapel was closed in 1778. By the 20th century, the ruins of the old chapel had long since disappeared. On 19 July 1927, a royal resolution was passed which authorized the construction of a new chapel in Masi. In 1931, a new wooden church which was designed by Høegh Omdal was completed. The church was consecrated on 11 March 1931 by the Bishop Eivind Berggrav. The church was not used very long because near the end of World War II in 1944, the retreating German army burned the church. After the war when there were funds available, the church was rebuilt. It was completed in 1965.

== See also ==
- List of churches in Nord-Hålogaland
