= Kokelv =

Kokelv: Kokelv (Norwegian); Goavkejohka (Northern Sami)
- Village
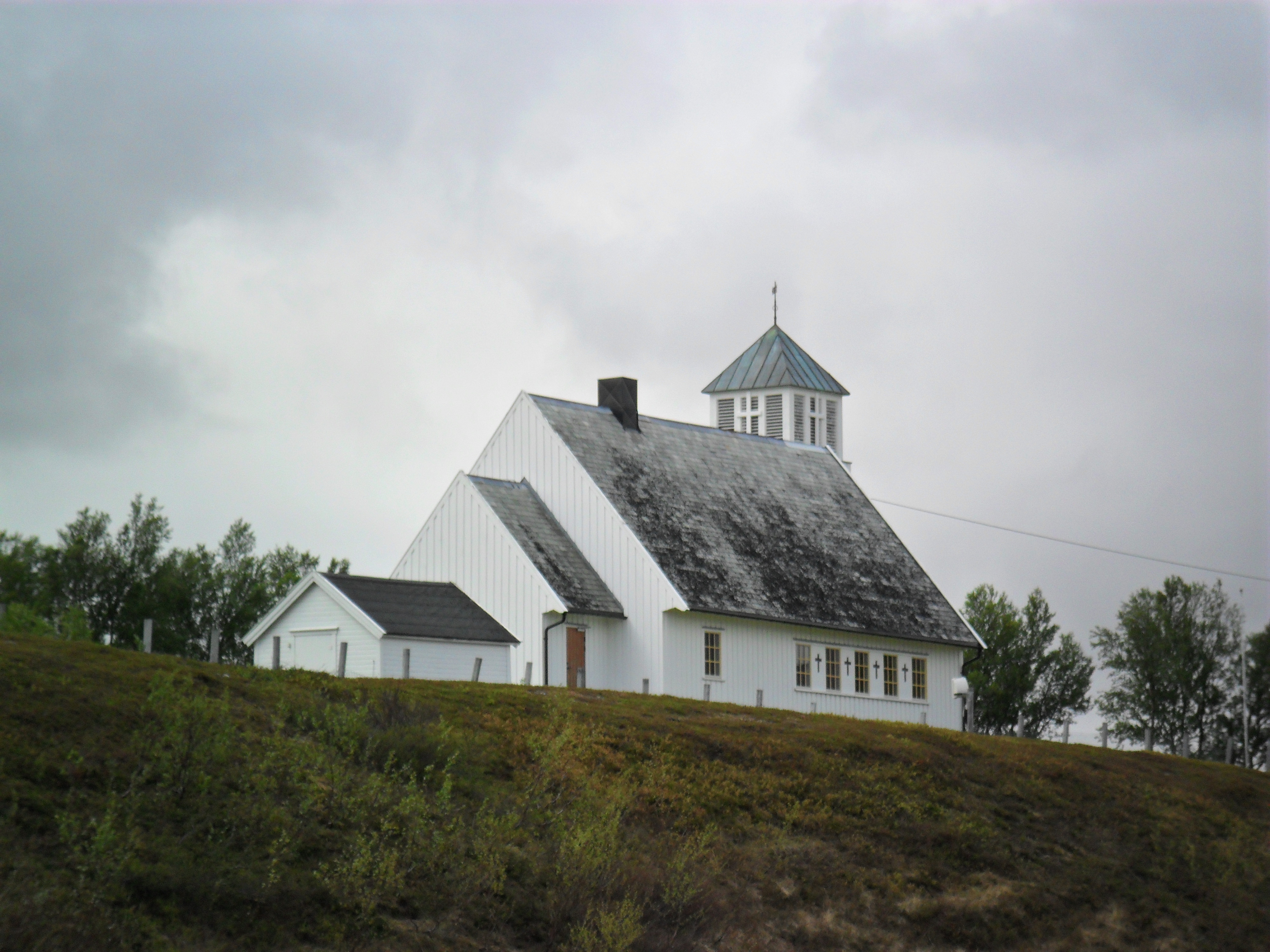
- View of the village church
- Interactive map of Kokelv
- Location within Finnmark Location within Norway
- Coordinates: 70°36′47″N 24°39′09″E
- Country: Norway
- Region: Northern Norway
- County: Finnmark
- District: Vest-Finnmark
- Municipality: Hammerfest Municipality
- Elevation: 12 m (39 ft)
- Time zone: UTC+01:00 (CET)
  - Summer (DST): UTC+02:00 (CEST)
- Post Code: 9715 Kokelv

Kokelv (Norwegian) or Goavkejohka (Northern Sami) is a village in Hammerfest Municipality in Finnmark county, Norway. The village is located on the mainland, along the Revsbotn fjord, at the mouth of the river Russelva. Kokelv Church is located in this village.

Prior to 2020, the village was part of the old Kvalsund Municipality.
