= Seiland National Park =

National park in Finnmark, Norway

- Seiland nasjonalpark (Norwegian); Sievjju álbmotmeahcci (Northern Sami)
- IUCN category II (national park)
- Interactive map of Seiland National Park
- Location: Finnmark, Norway
- Nearest city: Alta and Hammerfest
- Coordinates: 70°23′N 23°10′E
- Area: 316 km^{2} (78,100 acres)
- Established: 8 December 2006
- Governing body: County Governor

Seiland National Park (Norwegian: Seiland nasjonalpark or Northern Sami: Sievjju álbmotmeahcci) lies in Alta Municipality and Hammerfest Municipality in Finnmark county, Norway. The park includes the majority of the island of Seiland, the second-largest island in Finnmark after Sørøya. The park includes two glaciers: Seilandsjøkelen and Nordmannsjøkelen (the northernmost glaciers in Scandinavia). The highest point in the park is the 1,078-metre (3,537 ft) tall mountain Seilandstuva. The 316-square-kilometre (122 sq mi) park was established on 8 December 2006. The 9.6 square kilometres (3.7 sq mi) of the water inside the park's area, includes the surrounding sea and many fjords including the Nordefjorden, Sørefjorden, and Flaskefjorden.

== Flora and habitats ==
Saltfjellet–Svartisen encompasses a diverse suite of semi‑natural coastal and alpine habitats. Along the fjord inlets, narrow belts of coastal meadow and semi‑natural grassland persist where historic mowing and grazing have maintained species‑rich turf; botanists have recorded vulnerable plants such as the Finnmark snow‑primrose (Primula farinosa) and other red‑listed taxa in these areas. Above the shoreline, extensive stands of traditional hay meadows (slåttemark)—classified as critically endangered—survive on the slopes north of Store Bekkarfjord, where remnants of 20th‑century mowing remain visible in both field observations and aerial imagery. Farther inland, semi‑natural mires and wet meadows show traces of former peat cutting and fodder harvest, supporting robust communities of bottle sedge (Carex rostrata), cloudberry (Rubus chamaemorus) and sundew (Drosera spp.) in association with old drainage ditches. Upland areas above the tree line are dominated by boreal heath—with crowberry, reindeer lichen and dwarf shrub vegetation—and by tundra on exposed ridges, where low cold‑tolerant forbs and moss‑ and lichen‑rich outcrops form a continuous mosaic of high‑latitude alpine plant communities.

== Fauna ==
In June and July 2019, helicopter‑based surveys logged 122 bird observations across 27 species, yielding precise locations for nests and territories of raptors and waders. Five golden eagle (Aquila chrysaetos) territories were confirmed—two of which fledged young in 2019—and nine white-tailed eagle (Haliaeetus albicilla) territories were recorded, with at least one successful brood. Observations also included red‑listed species such as Eurasian curlew (Numenius arquata) and black-tailed godwit (Limosa limosa), as well as vulnerable falcons (gyrfalcon and peregrine falcon) and locally important ptarmigan (Lagopus spp.). The distribution of these records, plotted against park boundaries, emphasises the importance of coastal cliffs and inland ridges as breeding and foraging areas. Mammalian records during the same fieldwork included Eurasian otter (Lutra lutra), a vulnerable species in Norway, and evidence of Arctic hare.
