= Masi, Norway =

Masi (Norwegian) Máze (Northern Sami) Maasi (Finnish)
- Village
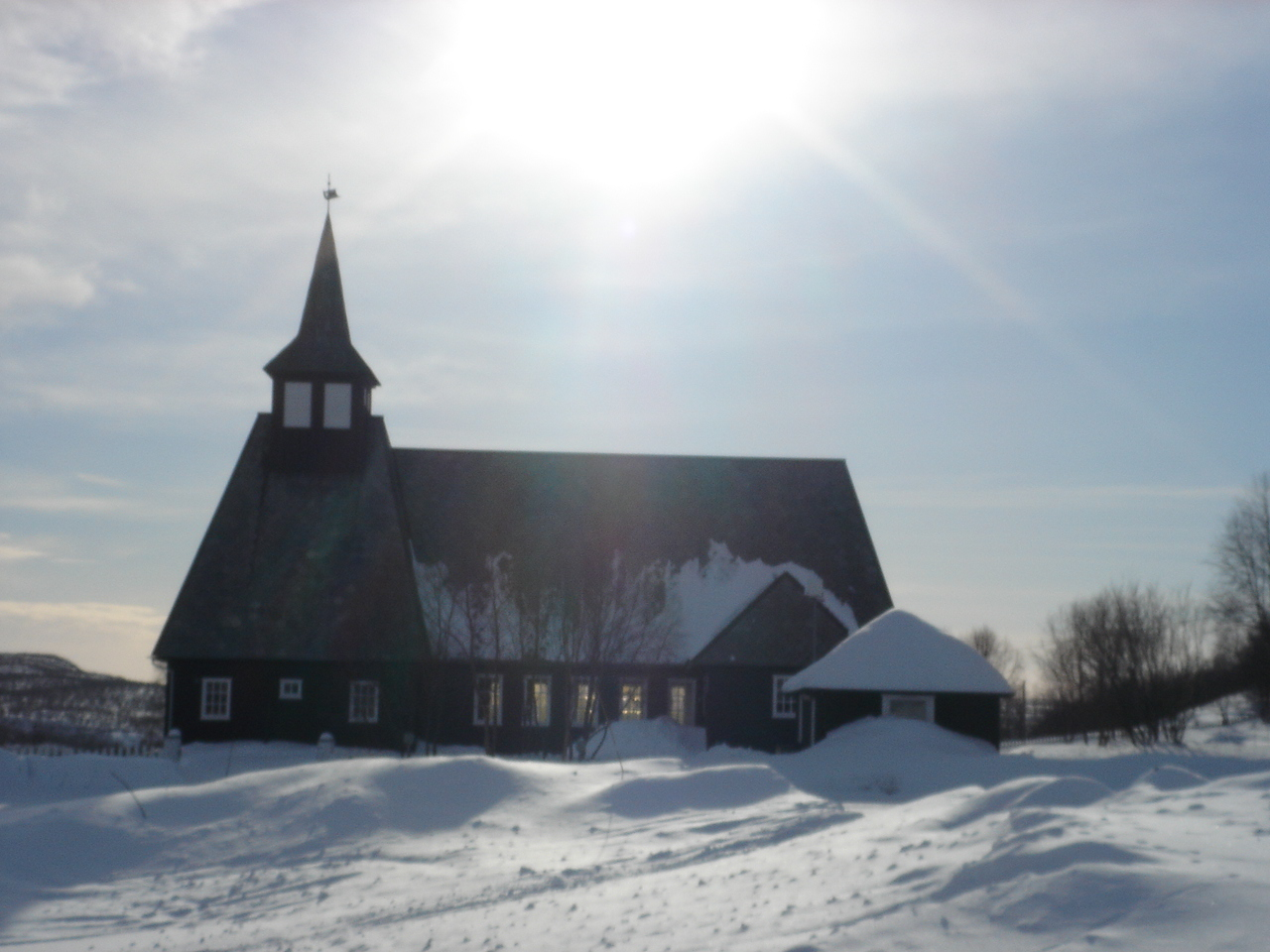
- Interactive map of Masi (Norwegian)
- Location within Finnmark Location within Norway
- Coordinates: 69°26′37″N 23°40′01″E
- Country: Norway
- Region: Northern Norway
- County: Finnmark
- District: Vest-Finnmark
- Municipality: Kautokeino
- Elevation: 282 m (925 ft)
- Time zone: UTC+01:00 (CET)
  - Summer (DST): UTC+02:00 (CEST)
- Post Code: 9525 Maze

Masi (Norwegian), Máze (Northern Sami), or Maasi (Finnish) is a village in Kautokeino Municipality in Finnmark county, Norway.

The village is located along the river Kautokeinoelva, a tributary of the Alta river. about 60 kilometres (37 mi) south of the town of Alta and about 60 kilometres north of the village of Kautokeino. The village is made up predominantly of Sami people, a non-Norwegian group indigenous to the Fennoscandinavian peninsula .

Masi Church has stood in the town since the 17th century. The present church building is a reconstruction built after the original was torched by German soldiers during the Nazi occupation of Norway in World War II.

During the late 1970s, the Norwegian government planned to construct the Alta Hydroelectric Power Station downstream, which was expected to flood Masi, upstream Kautokeino, and the surrounding reindeer pasture and disrupt reindeer migration and wild salmon fishing. Masi was among several sites of protest in what became known later as the Alta controversy.
