= Rolf Harlew Jenssen =

Norwegian architect (1916–2008)

- Born: 11 November 1916; Hammerfest, Norway
- Died: 20 July 2008 (aged 91); Hammerfest, Norway
- Occupation: Architect
- Spouse: Gerd Mathea Jenssen
- Parent(s): Anton Oluf Jensen; Mathilde Gjertrude Isaksen

Rolf Harlew Jenssen (1916—2008) was a Norwegian architect.

Rolf Harlew Jenssen was from Hammerfest, Norway, where he lived all his life, only interrupted by education from 1939 to 1943. After World War II from 1945 until 1955, he worked on church reconstruction since the retreating German army burned most churches in Finnmark. Jenssen was a district architect at the Norwegian State Housing Bank from 1967 to 1983, when he retired.

Rolf Harlew Jenssen was married to Gerd Mathea Jenssen (1928-2008). The parents were Anton Oluf Jensen (1872-1963) and Mathilde Gjertrude Isaksen (1886-1971).

== Works ==
- Breivikbotn Chapel
- Indre Eidsfjord Church
- Kokelv Church
- Masi Church
- Skallelv Chapel
- Skarsvåg Church
- Skoganvarre Chapel
- Slotten Church
