= Skoganvarre Chapel =

- Skoganvarre kapell
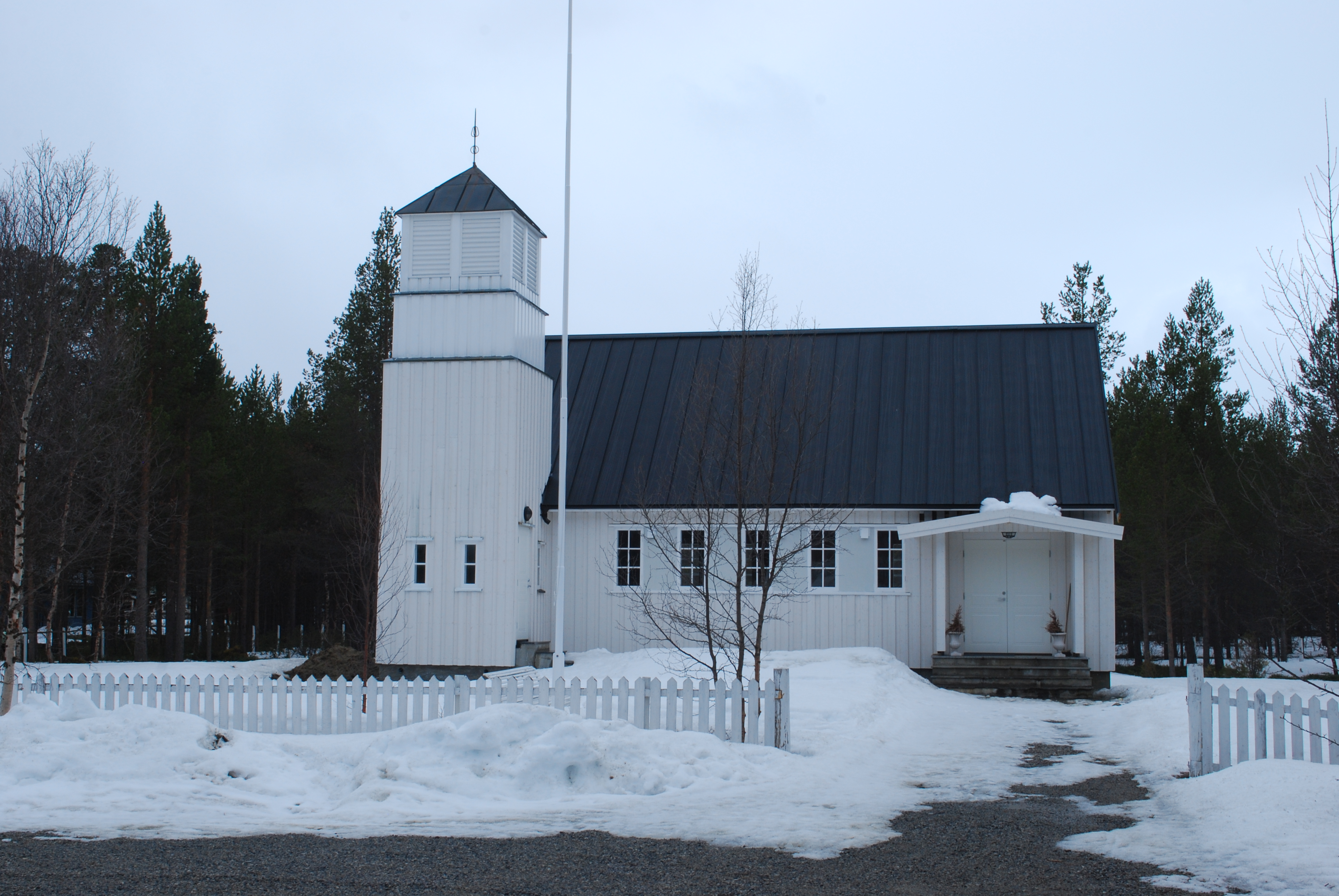
- View of the church
- Skoganvarre Chapel
- 69.839899°N 25.076236°E
- Location: Porsanger Municipality, Finnmark
- Country: Norway
- Denomination: Church of Norway
- Churchmanship: Evangelical Lutheran

History
- Status: Chapel
- Founded: 1963
- Consecrated: 7 October 1963

Architecture
- Functional status: Active
- Architect: Rolf Harlew Jenssen
- Architectural type: Long church
- Completed: 1963 (63 years ago)

Specifications
- Capacity: 90
- Materials: Wood

Administration
- Diocese: Nord-Hålogaland
- Deanery: Indre Finnmark prosti
- Parish: Porsanger
- Norwegian Cultural Heritage Site
- Type: Church
- Status: Not protected
- ID: 85472

Skoganvarre Chapel (Norwegian: Skoganvarre kapell) is a chapel of the Church of Norway in Porsanger Municipality in Finnmark county, Norway. It is located in the village of Skoganvarre. It is an annex chapel for the Porsanger parish which is part of the Indre Finnmark prosti (deanery) in the Diocese of Nord-Hålogaland. The white, wooden church was built in a long church style in 1963 using plans drawn up by the architect Rolf Harlew Jenssen. The church seats about 90 people. The chapel was consecrated on 7 October 1963.

== See also ==
- List of churches in Nord-Hålogaland
