= Doggejávri =

Lake in Kvalsund, Norway

- Interactive map of the lake
- Location: Finnmark
- Coordinates: 70.3711°N 24.5325°E
- Basin countries: Norway
- Max. length: 4 kilometres (2.5 mi)
- Max. width: 1 kilometre (0.62 mi)
- Surface area: 2.96 km^{2} (1.14 sq mi)
- Shore length^{1}: 10.18 kilometres (6.33 mi)
- Surface elevation: 288 metres (945 ft)
- References: NVE
- ^{1} Shore length is not a well-defined measure.

Doggejávri is a lake in Hammerfest Municipality in Finnmark county, Norway. The 2.96-square-kilometre (1.14 sq mi) lake lies about 10 kilometres (6.2 mi) southeast of the village of Oldernes, not far from the European route E06 highway.

== See also ==
- List of lakes in Norway
