= Kokelv Church =

- Kokelv kirke
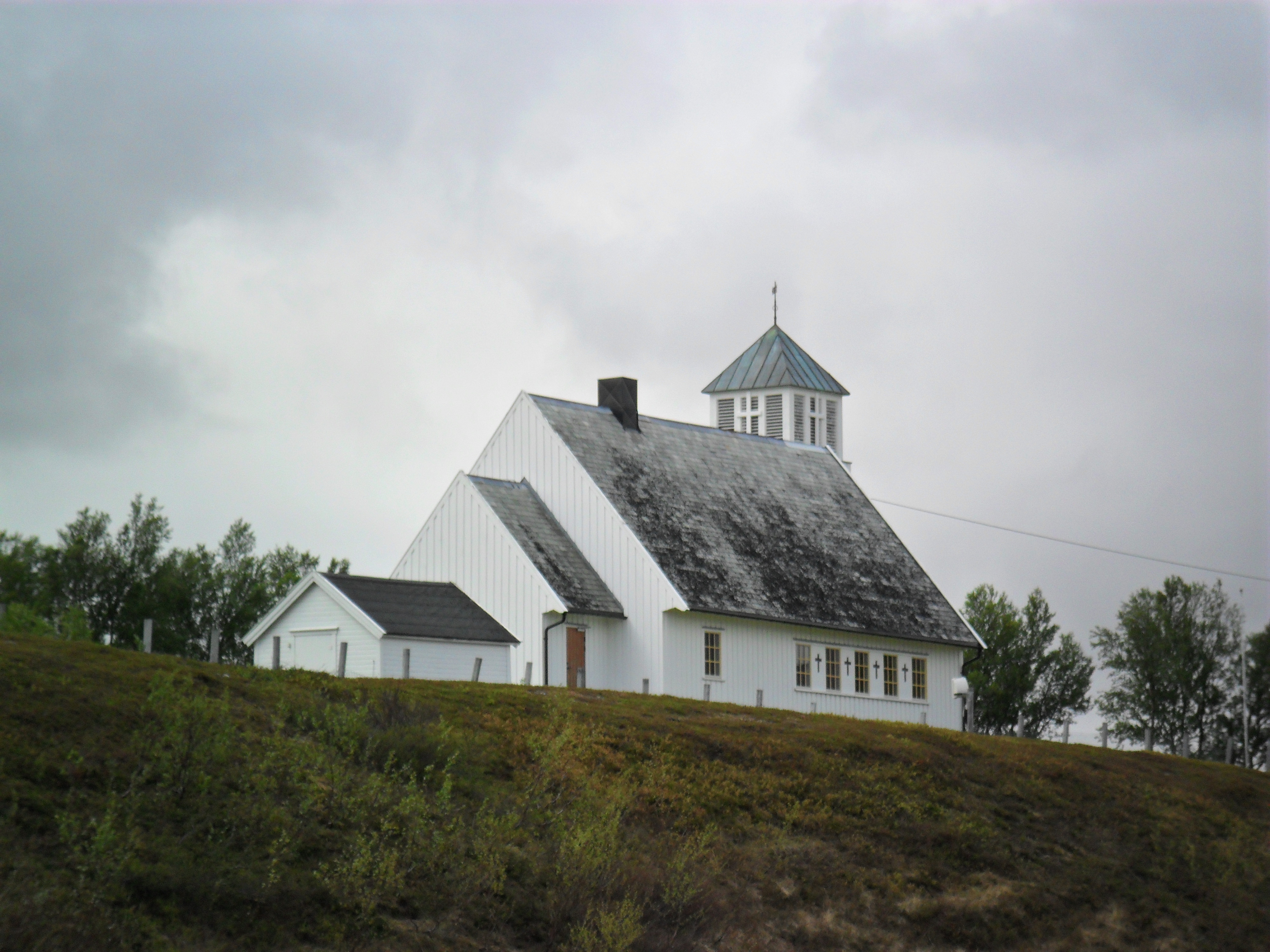
- View of the church
- Kokelv Church
- 70.610791°N 24.651936°E
- Location: Hammerfest Municipality, Finnmark
- Country: Norway
- Denomination: Church of Norway
- Churchmanship: Evangelical Lutheran

History
- Status: Parish church
- Founded: 1960
- Consecrated: 1960

Architecture
- Functional status: Active
- Architect: Rolf Harlew Jenssen
- Architectural type: Long church
- Completed: 1960 (66 years ago)

Specifications
- Capacity: 120
- Materials: Wood

Administration
- Diocese: Nord-Hålogaland
- Deanery: Hammerfest prosti
- Parish: Kokelv
- Norwegian Cultural Heritage Site
- Type: Church
- Status: Not protected
- ID: 84802

Kokelv Church (Norwegian: Kokelv kirke) is a parish church of the Church of Norway in Hammerfest Municipality in Finnmark county, Norway. It is located in the village of Kokelv. It is the church for the Kokelv parish which is part of the Hammerfest prosti (deanery) in the Diocese of Nord-Hålogaland. The white, wooden church was built in a long church style in 1960 using plans drawn up by the architect Rolf Harlew Jenssen. The church seats about 120 people.

The church was built by a group of 24 German volunteers sponsored by Action Reconciliation Service for Peace (German: Aktion Sühnezeichen Friedensdienste), who spent seven months in Kokelv to build the church as a sign of reconciliation with the Norwegian people who had suffered under German occupation during World War II.

== See also ==
- List of churches in Nord-Hålogaland
