= Bjørnstadvatnet =

Lake in Kvalsund, Norway

- Interactive map of the lake
- Location: Finnmark
- Coordinates: 70.3673°N 23.6987°E
- Basin countries: Norway
- Max. length: 5 kilometres (3.1 mi)
- Max. width: 2 kilometres (1.2 mi)
- Surface area: 4.63 km^{2} (1.79 sq mi)
- Shore length^{1}: 22.31 kilometres (13.86 mi)
- Surface elevation: 284 metres (932 ft)
- References: NVE
- ^{1} Shore length is not a well-defined measure.

Bjørnstadvatnet is a lake in Hammerfest Municipality in Finnmark county, Norway. The 4.63-square-kilometre (1.79 sq mi) lake lies about 5 kilometres (3.1 mi) east of the village of Saraby. The lake has a dam on the northern end of the lake, and it is regulated for hydroelectric power.

== See also ==
- List of lakes in Norway
