= Kvalsund Tunnel =

Road tunnel in Tromsø, Norway

Kvalsund Tunnel Kvalsundtunnelen
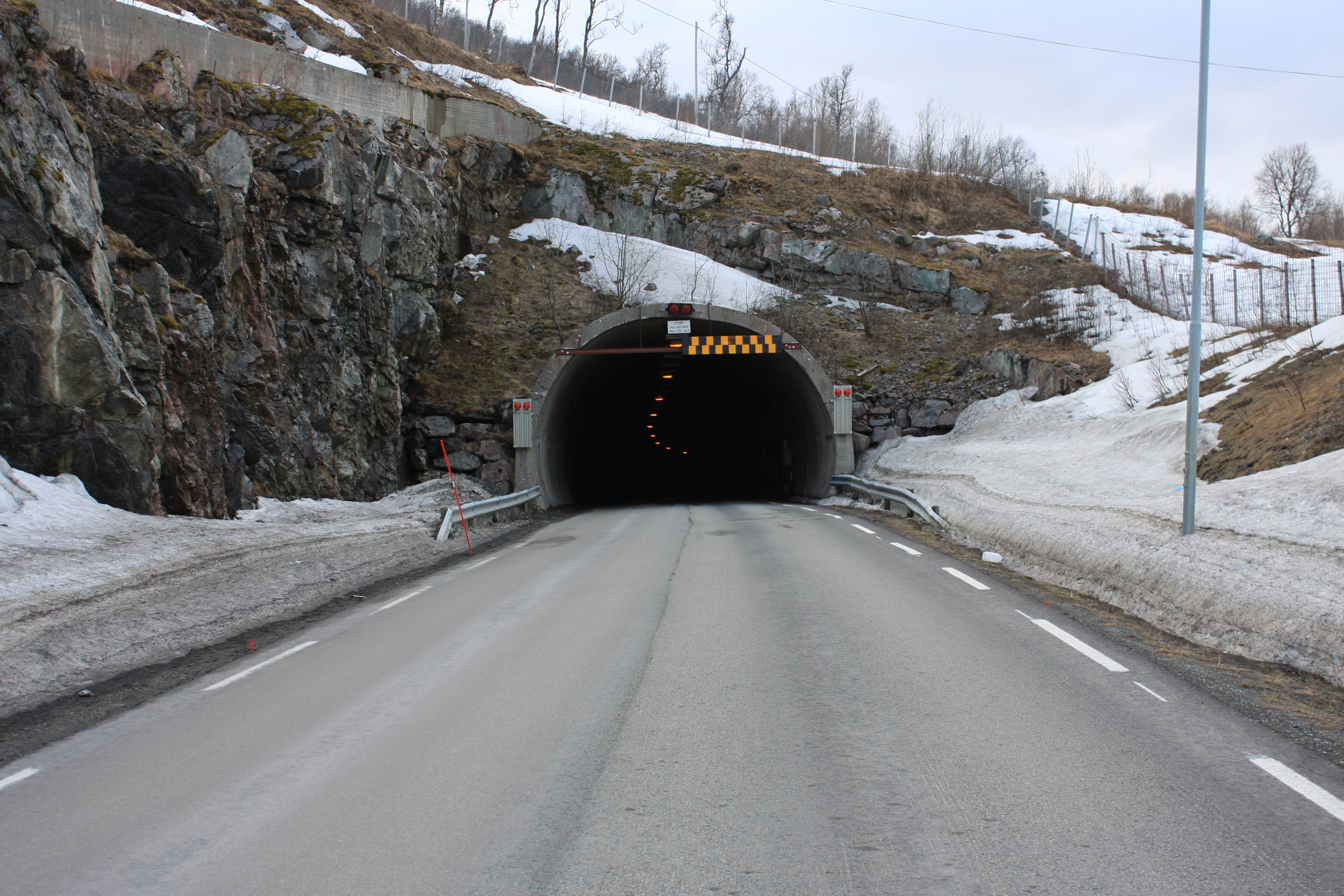
- View of the southern entrance to the tunnel
- Interactive map of Kvalsund Tunnel; Kvalsundtunnelen

Overview
- Location: Tromsø, Troms, Norway
- Coordinates: 69.8133°N 19.0144°E
- Status: In use
- Route: Fv863
- Start: Kvaløya
- End: Ringvassøya

Operation
- Opened: 1988
- Character: Automotive

Technical
- Length: 1,650 metres (5,410 ft)
- No. of lanes: 2
- Min elevation: −56 metres (−184 ft)
- Width: 4.1 metres (13 ft)

The Kvalsund Tunnel (Norwegian: Kvalsundtunnelen) is a subsea road tunnel which links the islands of Kvaløya and Ringvassøya in Tromsø Municipality in Troms county, Norway. Located along Norwegian County Road 863, the tunnel runs under the Kvalsundet strait between the villages of Sørhelltaren and Nordhella. The 1,650-metre (5,410 ft) long tunnel was completed in 1988 and it reaches a depth of −56 metres (−184 ft) below sea level. The tunnel replaced a ferry connection between the islands.
