= Seilandstuva =

Mountain on the island of Seiland in Finnmark county, Norway

- Location of the mountain

Highest point
- Elevation: 1,078 m (3,537 ft)
- Prominence: 1,078 m (3,537 ft)
- Isolation: 45.3 to 45.5 km (28.1 to 28.3 mi)
- Coordinates: 70.4462°N 23.0956°E

Geography
- Location: Finnmark, Norway
- Topo map: 1835 I Seiland

Seilandstuva is the highest mountain on the island of Seiland in Finnmark county, Norway. The 1,078-metre (3,537 ft) tall mountain lies on the border of the municipalities of Alta and Hammerfest, and is inside Seiland National Park. The Seilandsjøkelen glacier lies about 5 kilometres (3.1 mi) southeast of the mountain.

== Etymology ==
The last element is the finite form of tuve which means "tuft of grass" or "tussock" and the first part refers to the island on which it is located.
