= Kvalsundet (Tromsø) =

Strait in Troms, Norway

Kvalsundet (Norwegian); Válesnuorri (Northern Sami)
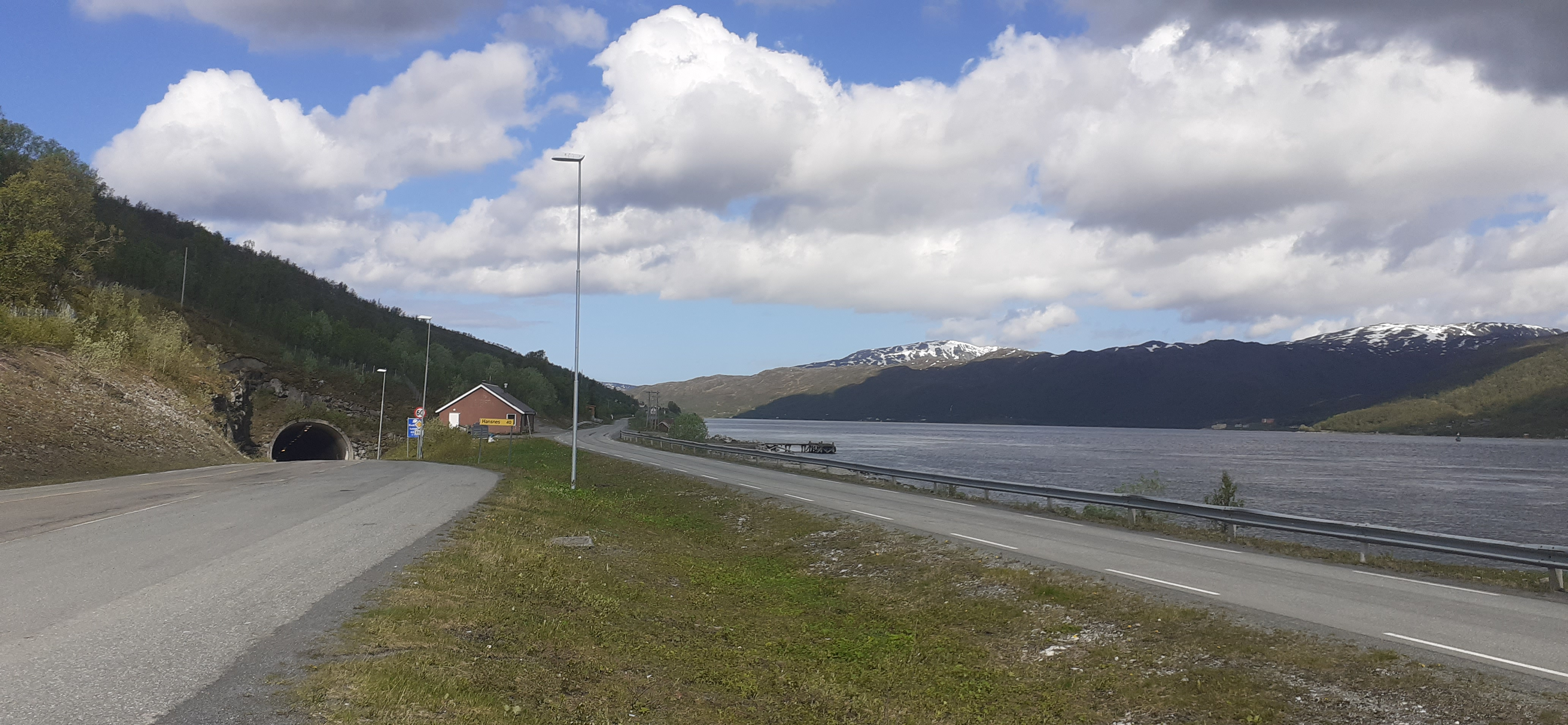
- View of the strait
- Interactive map of the strait
- Location: Troms county, Norway
- Coordinates: 69.8552°N 18.9018°E
- Type: Strait
- Basin countries: Norway
- Max. length: 20 kilometres (12 mi)
- Max. width: 1–5 kilometres (0.6–3.1 mi)

Kvalsundet (Norwegian) or Válesnuorri (Northern Sami) is a strait in Tromsø Municipality in Troms county, Norway. The 20-kilometre (12 mi) long strait separates the island of Kvaløya from the island of Ringvassøya. The 1–5-kilometre (0.6–3.1 mi) long strait is crossed by the subsea Kvalsund Tunnel. The strait joins the Grøtsundet strait on the south end, about 8 kilometres (5.0 mi) north of the city of Tromsø.
