= Nord-Bumannsfjorden =

Fjord in Hammerfest, Norway

Nord-Bumannsfjorden (Norwegian)
- Nuorttat Dáččavuotna (Northern Sami)
- Interactive map of the fjord
- Location: Finnmark county, Norway
- Coordinates: 70.4819°N 22.9621°E
- Type: Fjord
- Basin countries: Norway
- Max. length: 1.5 kilometres (0.93 mi)
- Max. width: 1.3 kilometres (0.81 mi)
- Max. depth: 84 metres (276 ft)

Nord-Bumannsfjorden (Norwegian) or Nuorttat Dáččavuotna (Northern Sami) is a fjord on the west side of the island of Seiland in Hammerfest Municipality, Finnmark county, Norway. The fjord extends about 1.5 kilometres (0.93 mi) southeastwards to the Nordre Bumannsfjorddalen valley at the bottom of the fjord. About 400 metres (1,300 ft) out into the fjord, the fjord reaches a maximum depth of 84 metres (276 ft). The fjord has no coastal settlements. The Sørefjorden lies a little further south.
