= Kvalsund, Hammerfest =

Village in Hammerfest, Norway

Kvalsund, Hammerfest: Kvalsund (Norwegian); Ráhkkerávju (Northern Sami)
- Village
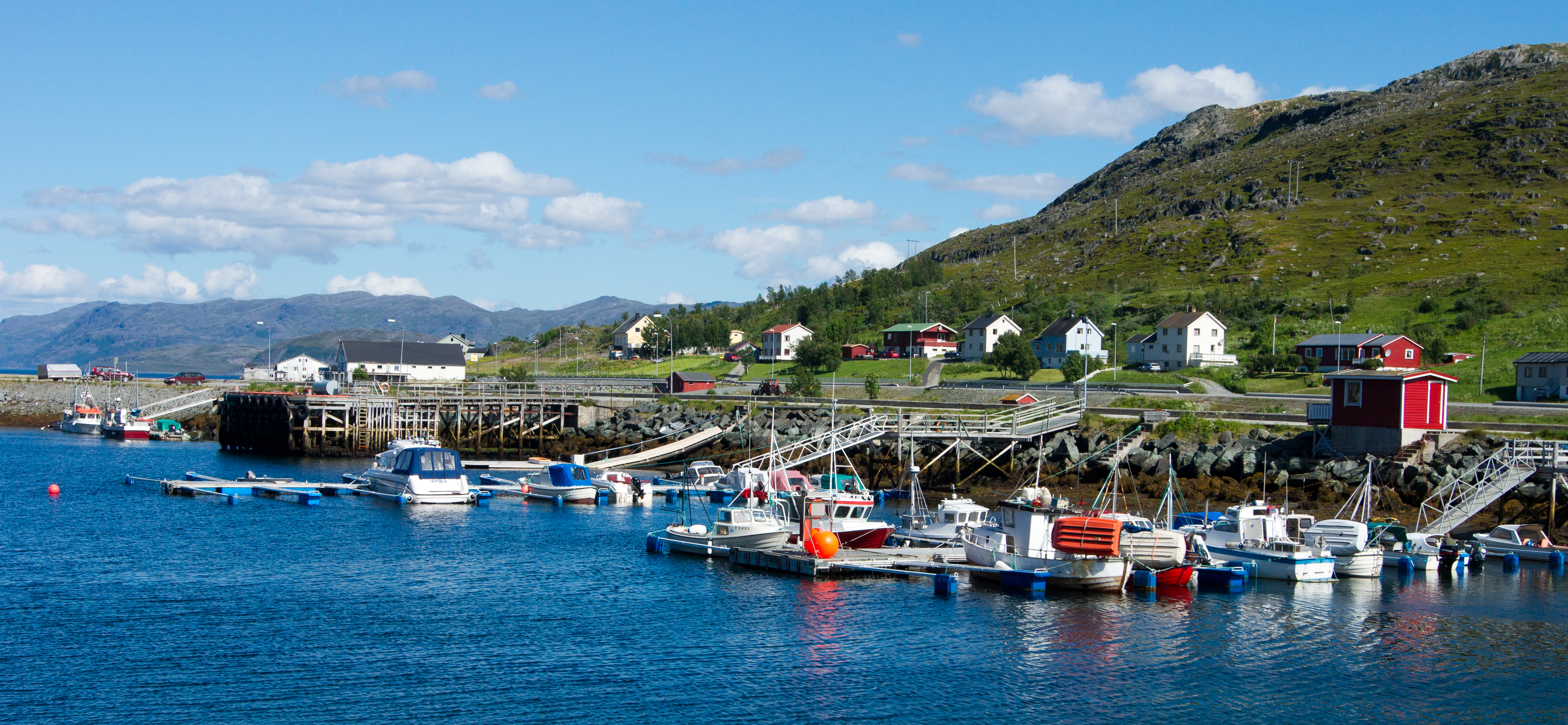
- Part of the village
- Interactive map of Kvalsund, Hammerfest
- Location within Finnmark Location within Norway
- Coordinates: 70°30′09″N 23°58′47″E
- Country: Norway
- Region: Northern Norway
- County: Finnmark
- District: Vest-Finnmark
- Municipality: Hammerfest Municipality

Area
  - Total: 0.31 km^{2} (0.12 sq mi)
- Elevation: 2 m (6.6 ft)

Population (2023)
  - Total: 289
  - Density: 932/km^{2} (2,410/sq mi)
- Time zone: UTC+01:00 (CET)
  - Summer (DST): UTC+02:00 (CEST)
- Post Code: 9620 Kvalsund

Kvalsund (Norwegian) or Ráhkkerávju (Northern Sami) is a village in Hammerfest Municipality in Finnmark county, Norway. It was formerly the administrative centre of the old Kvalsund Municipality which existed until 2020 when it merged with Hammerfest Municipality.

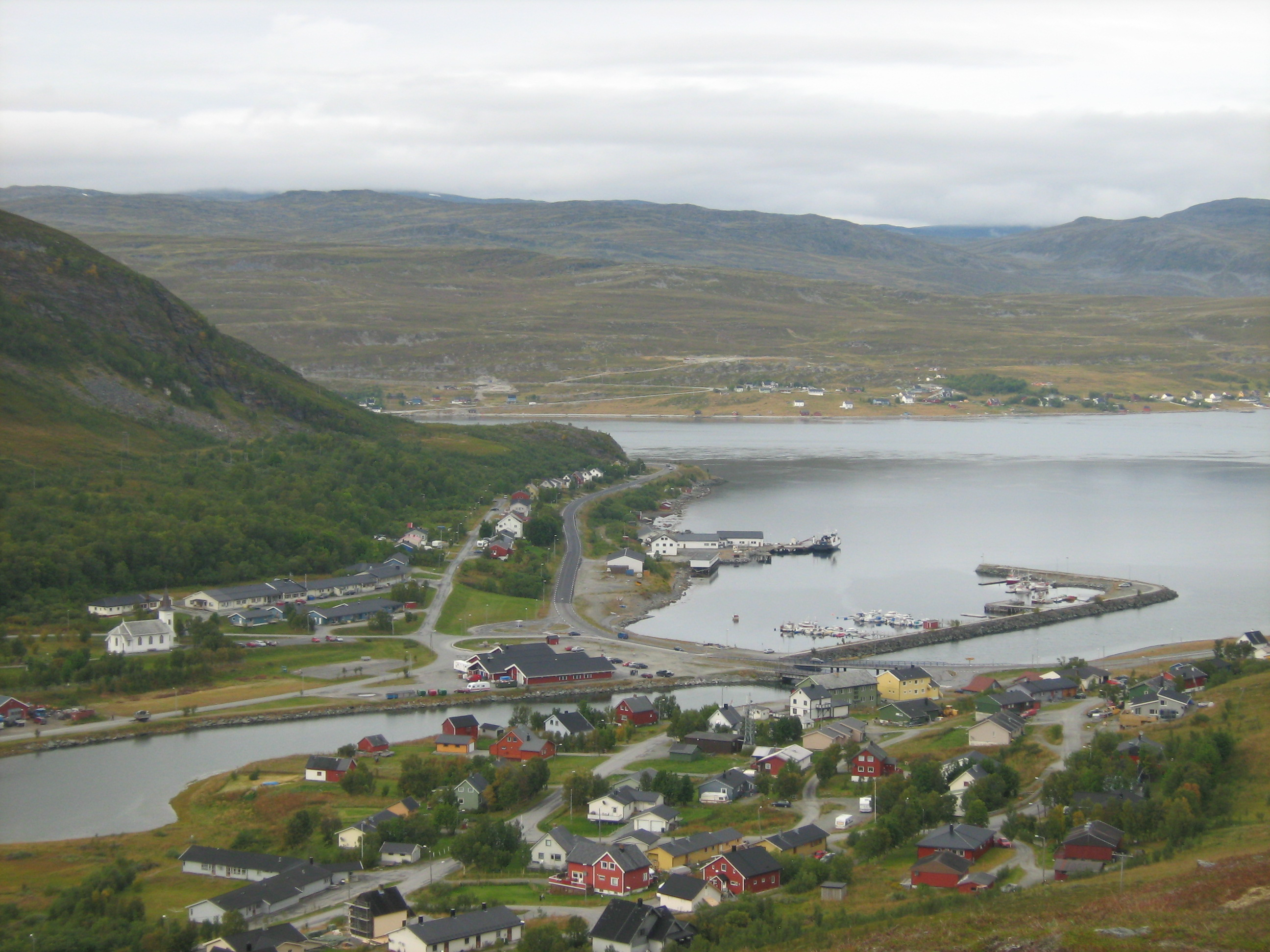
Kvalsund

The village is located on the mainland, along the Kvalsundet strait, at the mouth of the river Kvalsundelva. The village sits just east of the Kvalsund Bridge which connects the mainland to the island of Kvaløya, just to the north. The 1936 Kvalsund Church is located in this village.

The 0.31-square-kilometre (77-acre) village has a population (2023) of 289 which gives the village a population density of 932 inhabitants per square kilometre (2,410/sq mi).
