= Kvalsund Bridge =

Kvalsund Bridge Kvalsundbrua
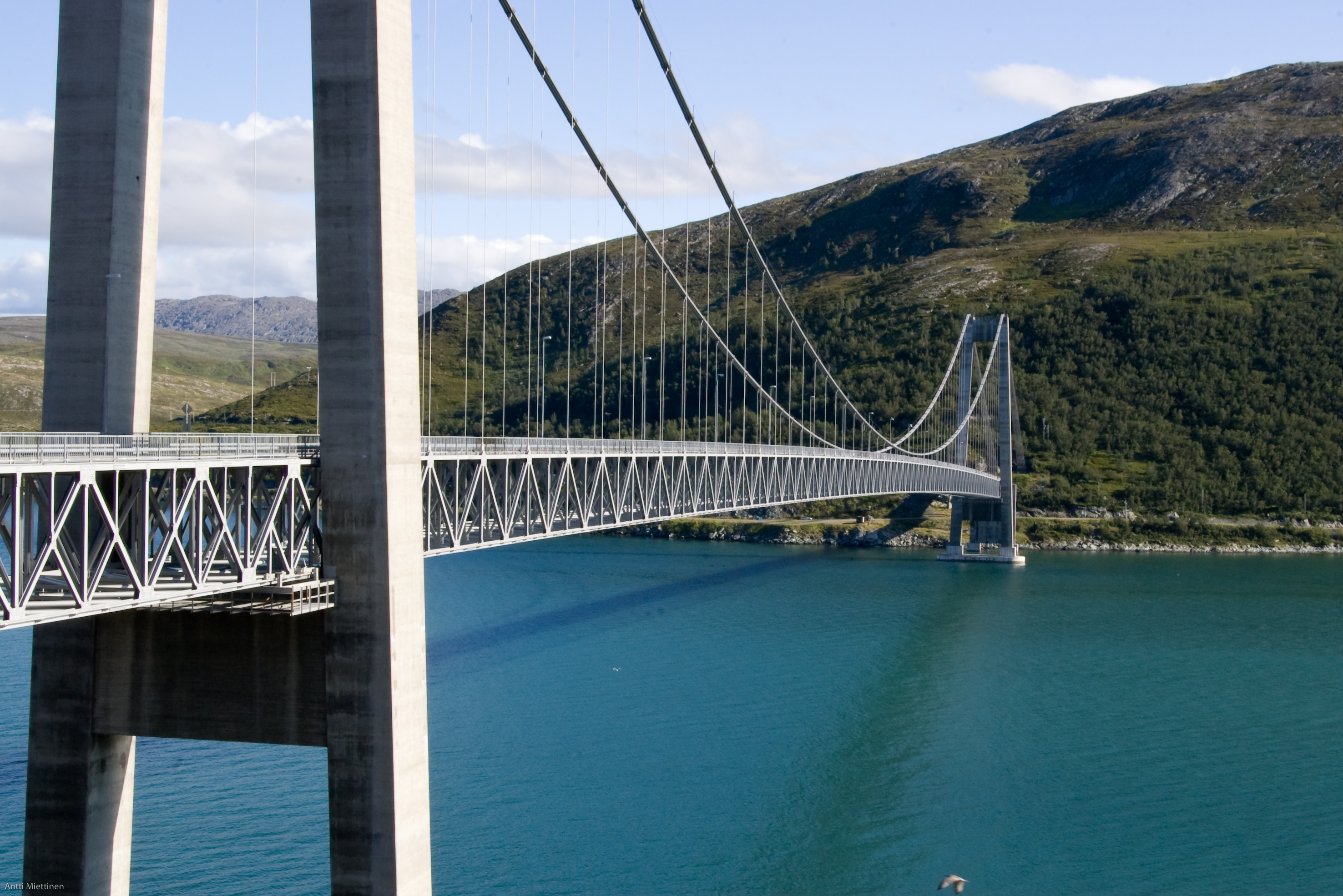
- View of the bridge
- Coordinates: 70.5134°N 23.9508°E
- Carries: Rv94
- Crosses: Kvalsundet
- Locale: Hammerfest Municipality, Norway

Characteristics
- Design: suspension bridge
- Total length: 741 metres (2,431 ft)
- Longest span: 525 metres (1,722 ft)
- Clearance below: 26 metres (85 ft)

History
- Opened: 1977

Location
- Interactive map of Kvalsund Bridge

The Kvalsund Bridge (Norwegian: Kvalsundbrua) is a suspension bridge in Hammerfest Municipality, Finnmark county, Norway. The bridge connects the mainland and the island of Kvaløya across the Kvalsundet strait. The bridge is located just west of the village of Kvalsund on the mainland and about 25 kilometres (16 mi) south of the town of Hammerfest.

Opened for traffic in 1977, the 741-metre-long (2,431 ft) bridge has 11 spans, the main span being 525 metres (1,722 ft). The maximum clearance to the sea is 26 metres (85 ft). The Kvalsund Bridge is the 56th longest suspension bridge in the world, and also the northernmost suspension bridge in the world.

== Media gallery ==
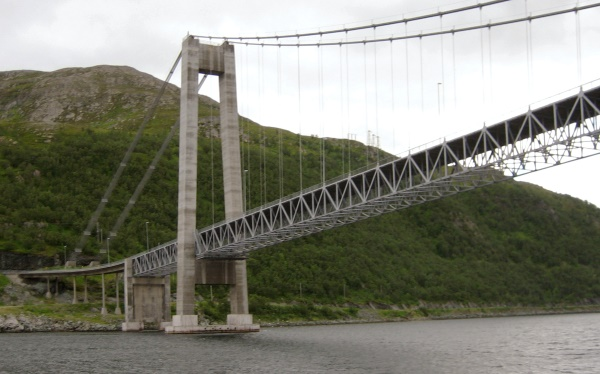
Kvalsund Bridge from below

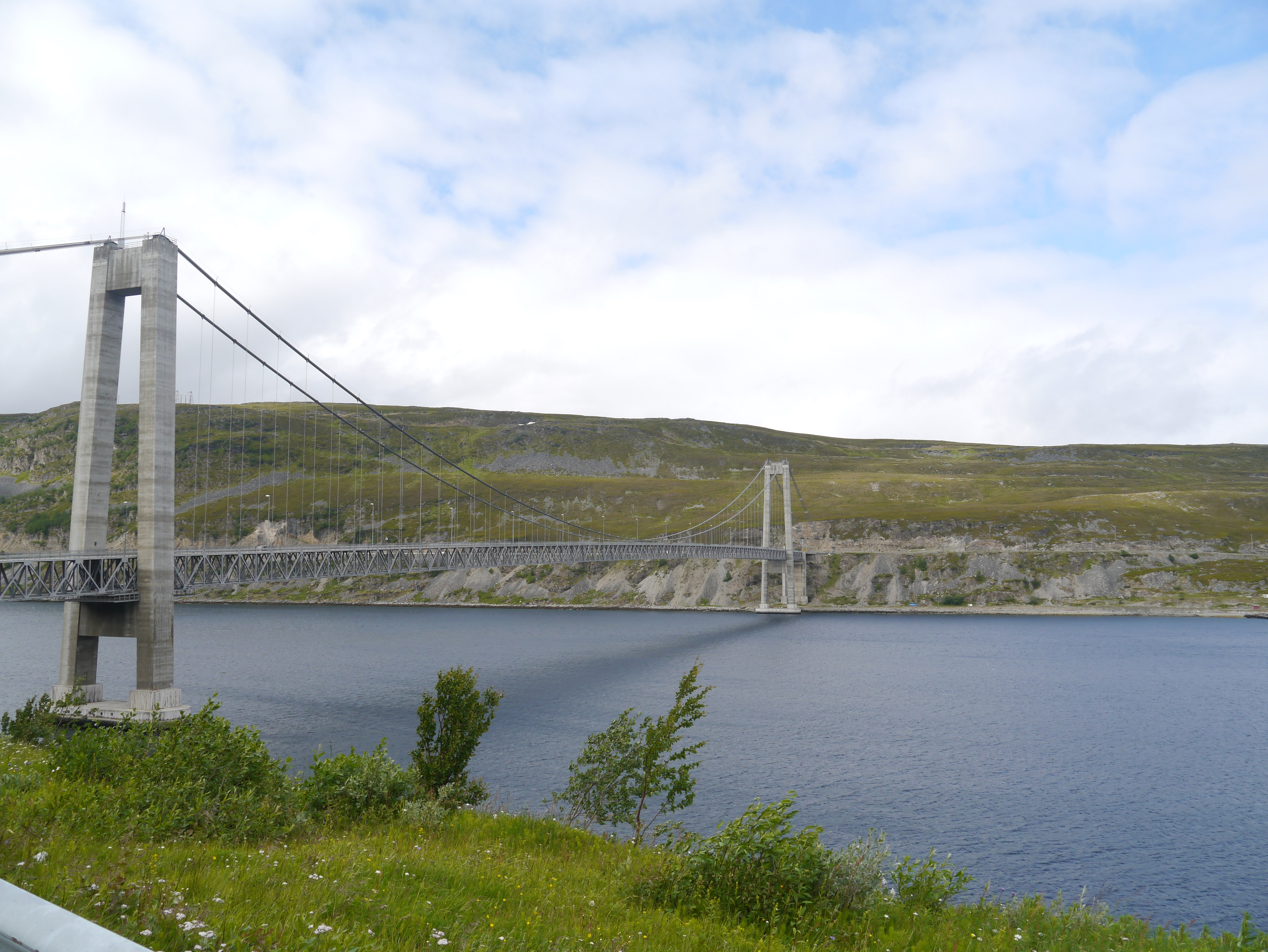
Kvalsund Bridge from the mainland

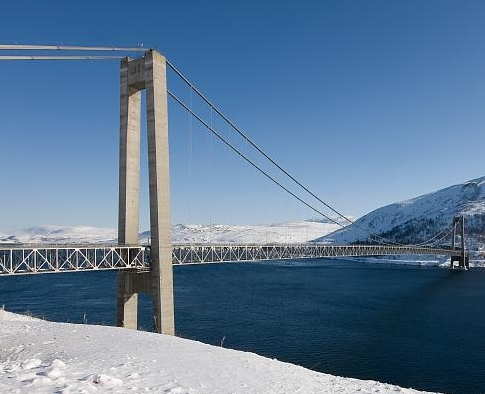
Kvalsund Bridge in winter
