= Kvalsundet =

Strait in Finnmark county, Norway

Coordinates: 70.508°N 23.927°E

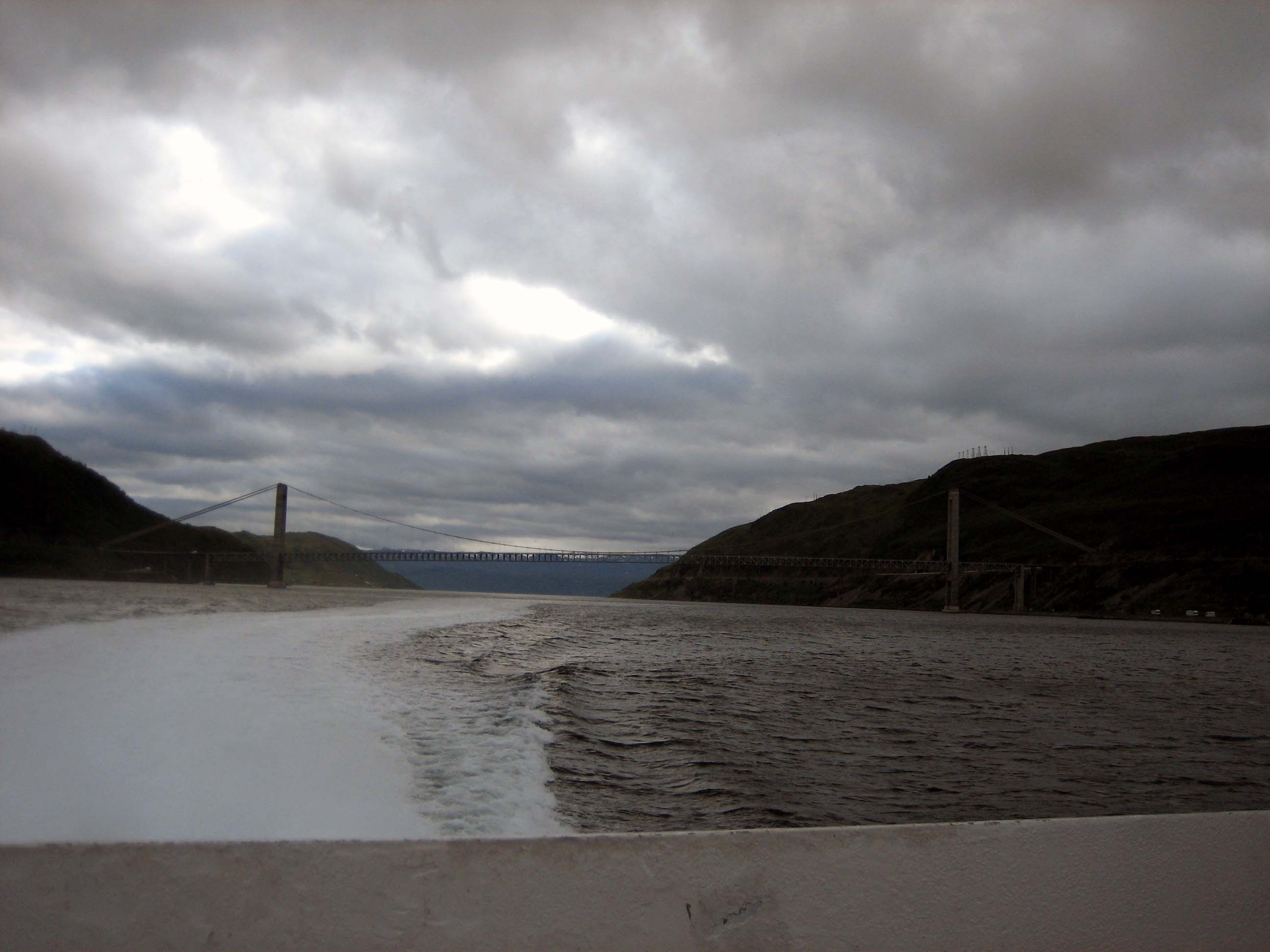
Kvalsundet is crossed by the Kvalsund Bridge.

Kvalsundet is a strait in Hammerfest Municipality in Finnmark county, Norway. The strait separates the island of Kvaløya from the mainland. The strait is crossed by Kvalsund Bridge, which connects Kvaløya to the mainland and is the world's northernmost suspension bridge. Norway's first power station based on tidal currents is located in the strait.

Still in the 1990s the strait was full of fish. Particularly the sei and cod were heavily fished in the strait and the waters around the Kvalöya with armadas of 80 - 100 trawlers coming into the sound every summer. This way the fish was practically wiped out from the strait in 20 years.
