= Seiland =

Island in Finnmark, Norway

Seiland (Norwegian); Sievju (Northern Sami)
- Interactive map of: Seiland (Norwegian); Sievju (Northern Sami)

Geography
- Location: Finnmark, Norway
- Coordinates: 70.42°N 23.24°E
- Area: 583 km^{2} (225 sq mi)
- Highest elevation: 1,078 m (3537 ft)
- Highest point: Seilandstuva

Administration
- Norway
- County: Finnmark
- Municipalities: Alta and Hammerfest

Demographics
- Population: 115{https://www.ssb.no/en/statbank/table/04317} (2026)
- Pop. density: 0.3/km^{2} (0.8/sq mi)

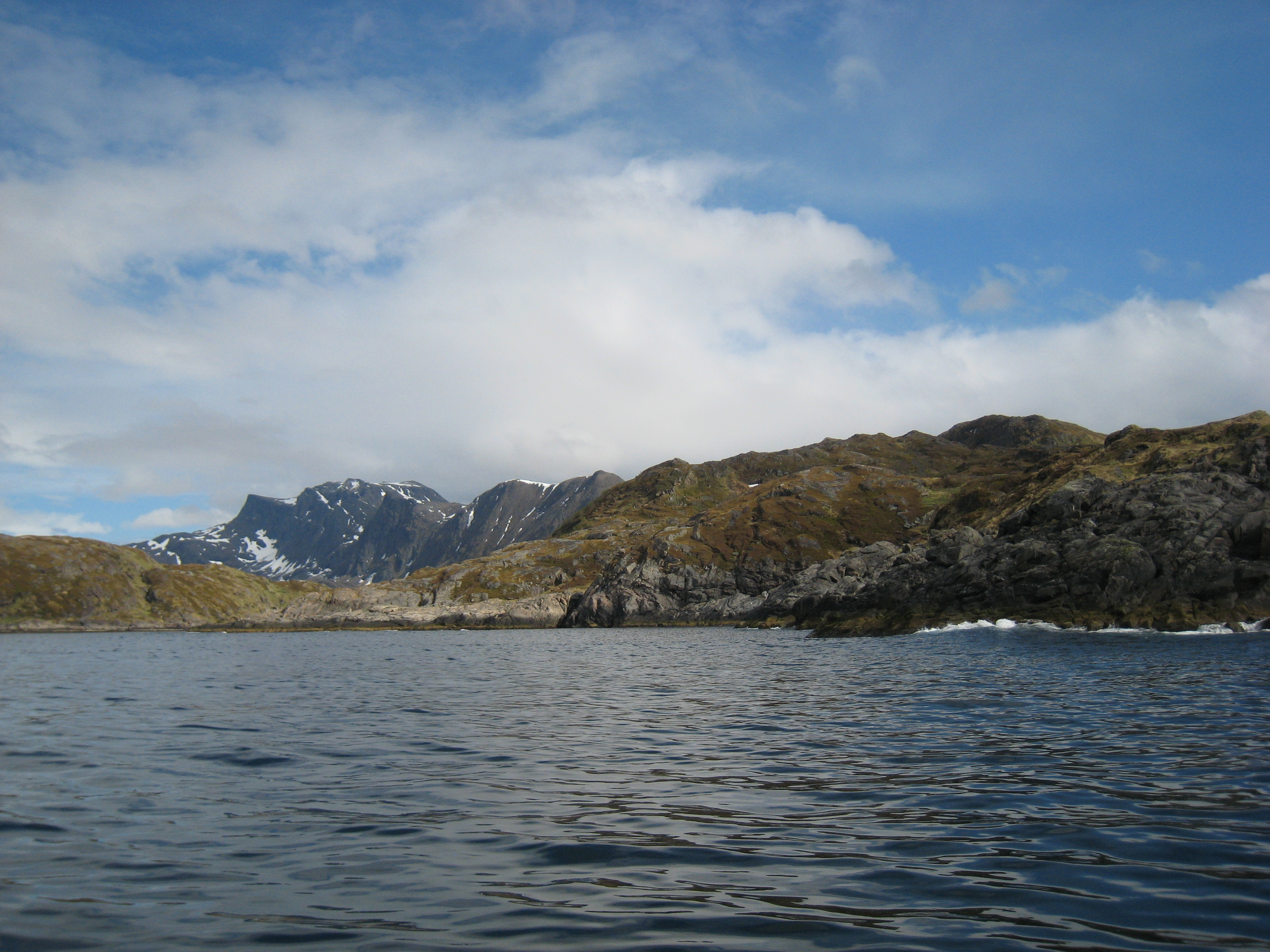
Rocky beaches of Seiland

Seiland (Norwegian) or Sievju (Northern Sami) is a substantial island off Norway's northern coast, covering about 600 square kilometres (230 sq mi). It is the eighth largest island in Norway proper, located in Finnmark county. It sits within the Caledonian orogenic zone, a mountain‑building belt formed during the Paleozoic. The southern and western parts of the island consist mainly of gabbroic rocks, marking the northeastern end of a basic petrographic province that extends more than 100 km to the southwest. The 583-square-kilometre (225 sq mi) island is divided between the Alta and Hammerfest municipalities.

== History ==
Archaeological remains—from Stone Age and Iron Age habitation sites to nineteenth‑century farm foundations—lie along many fjords, while Sami cultural heritage endures in old reindeer corrals, seasonal huts and sheep pens. In 2006, the majority of central Seiland was designated as Seiland National Park.

There are two glaciers on Seiland: Seilandsjøkelen and Nordmannsjøkelen. The 1,078-metre (3,537 ft) tall Seilandstuva is the tallest mountain on the island. A number of fjords are located on the island including Lille Kufjorden, Store Kufjorden, Nord-Bumannsfjorden, and Jøfjorden.

== Geography and climate ==
Seiland is the second‑largest island in Finnmark (after Sørøya) and is almost bisected by the fjords Store Kufjord and Jøfjord. The meltwater river Melkelva—so called because its heavy load of glacial "rock meal" gives it a milky appearance—flows from the Seilandsjøkelen ice cap across a hummocky outwash plain and drops via rapids and waterfalls into Store Bekkarfjord.

Seiland's terrain is exceptionally rugged, especially in its southern reaches where the land rises abruptly from sea level to the summit of 1,075 m (3,527 ft). Many peaks reach between 800 and 1,000 m (2,600 and 3,300 ft), and the deeply incised fjords and valleys display near‑vertical walls that form cliffs up to 1,000 m (3,300 ft) high. The island's high latitude and elevation produce a cold, wet climate, and persistent snow fields remain in the interior throughout the year. Two large glaciers occupy the island: Seilandsjøkelen to the east (about 30 km^{2} (12 sq mi)) and Nordmannsfjordjøkelen to the west (roughly 15 km^{2} (5.8 sq mi)). The western glacier has retreated considerably since 1900, its area halving and its volume declining even more sharply over the past century.

== Geology ==
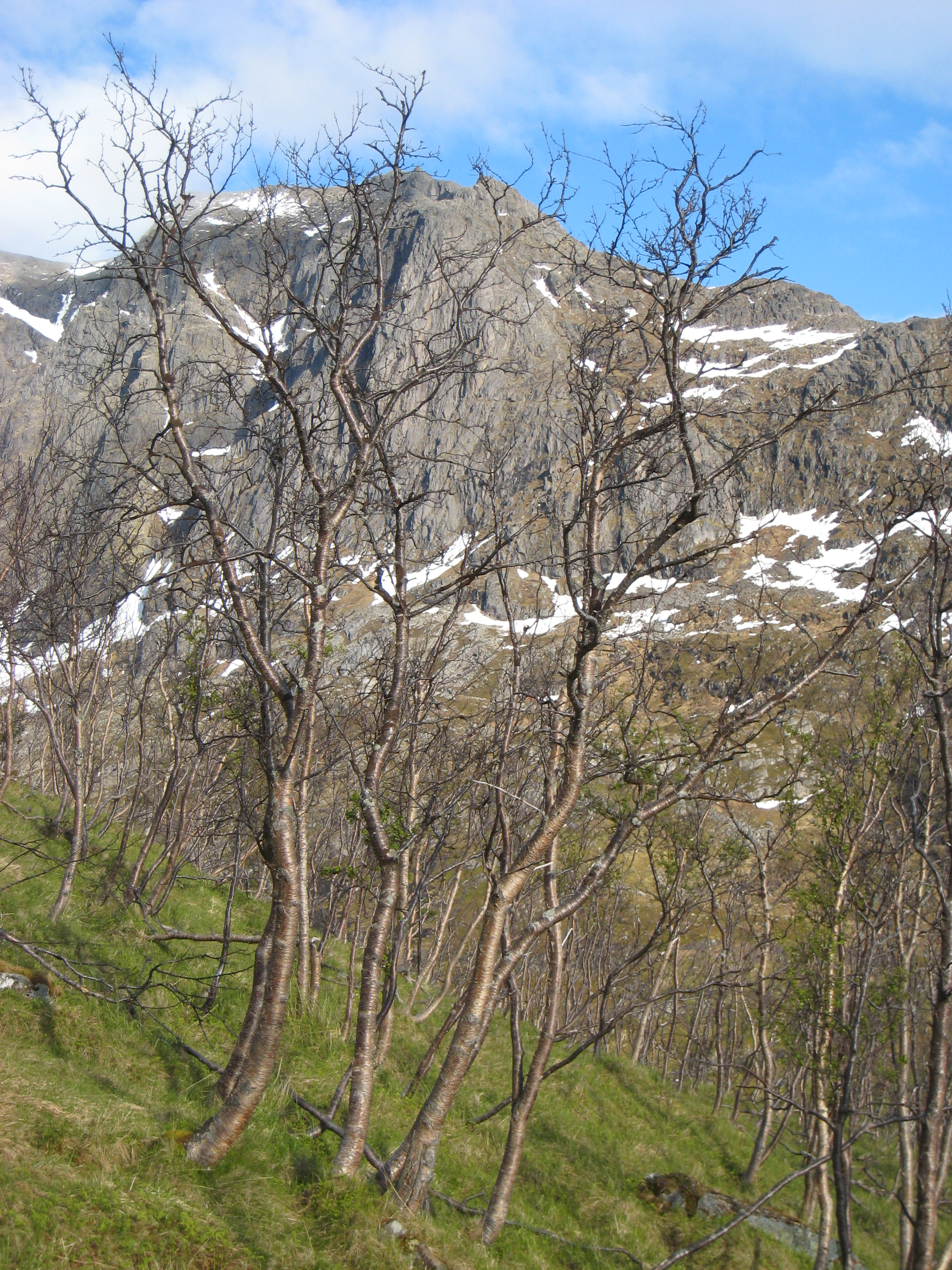
View from Bårdfjorddalen

Geological investigations by the Geological Survey of Norway began in 1952 to evaluate, among other aims, the commercial potential of thick albite‑nepheline pegmatite dykes. Seiland comprises two main complexes: a supracrustal amphibolite‑gneiss complex, characterised by gneissic textures derived from sandstone (with remnants of carbonate in places) and overprinted by metasomatic alteration; and a suite of igneous rocks ranging from gabbroic to ultrabasic compositions, including anorthosite, norite, olivine gabbro, pyroxenite, amphibolite, and peridotite, each hosting minerals such as plagioclase, olivine, pyroxene, hornblende and spinel. All gabbroic bodies on the island are concordant, with no discordant contacts, and several exposures exceed 1,000 metres (3,300 ft) in thickness while showing distinctive layering. Such layered mafic intrusions are rare worldwide—examples include the stillwater igneous complex and Bushveld Igneous Complex—but Seiland's gabbro is unique in occurring within a collisional orogen, where internal layering is uncommon. Theories for this layering range from crystal settling under magmatic convection (Wager) to analogies with crustal stratification (Buddington), yet the precise mechanism remains under study.

Dykes traverse the island, cutting the gabbroic units and, to a lesser extent, the metamorphic complex. These include basic dykes of various generations and an array of pegmatite dykes whose widths range from 10 cm (3.9 in) to over 100 m (330 ft). Among the pegmatites are granite, syenite, nepheline syenite (canadite), ringite, quartz diorite, diorite (plumasite) and gabbroic types. Their extreme compositional diversity suggests multiple origins: only the gabbroic, quartz‑diorite and diorite pegmatites likely derive from differentiation of gabbroic magma, whereas the genesis of canadite and ringite remains enigmatic. The largest known dyke is a heterogeneous canadite body extending westward from Bekkarfjordnes for several kilometres and reaching more than 100 m (330 ft) in width.

== See also ==
- List of islands of Norway
