= Kvalsund Church =

- Kvalsund kirke
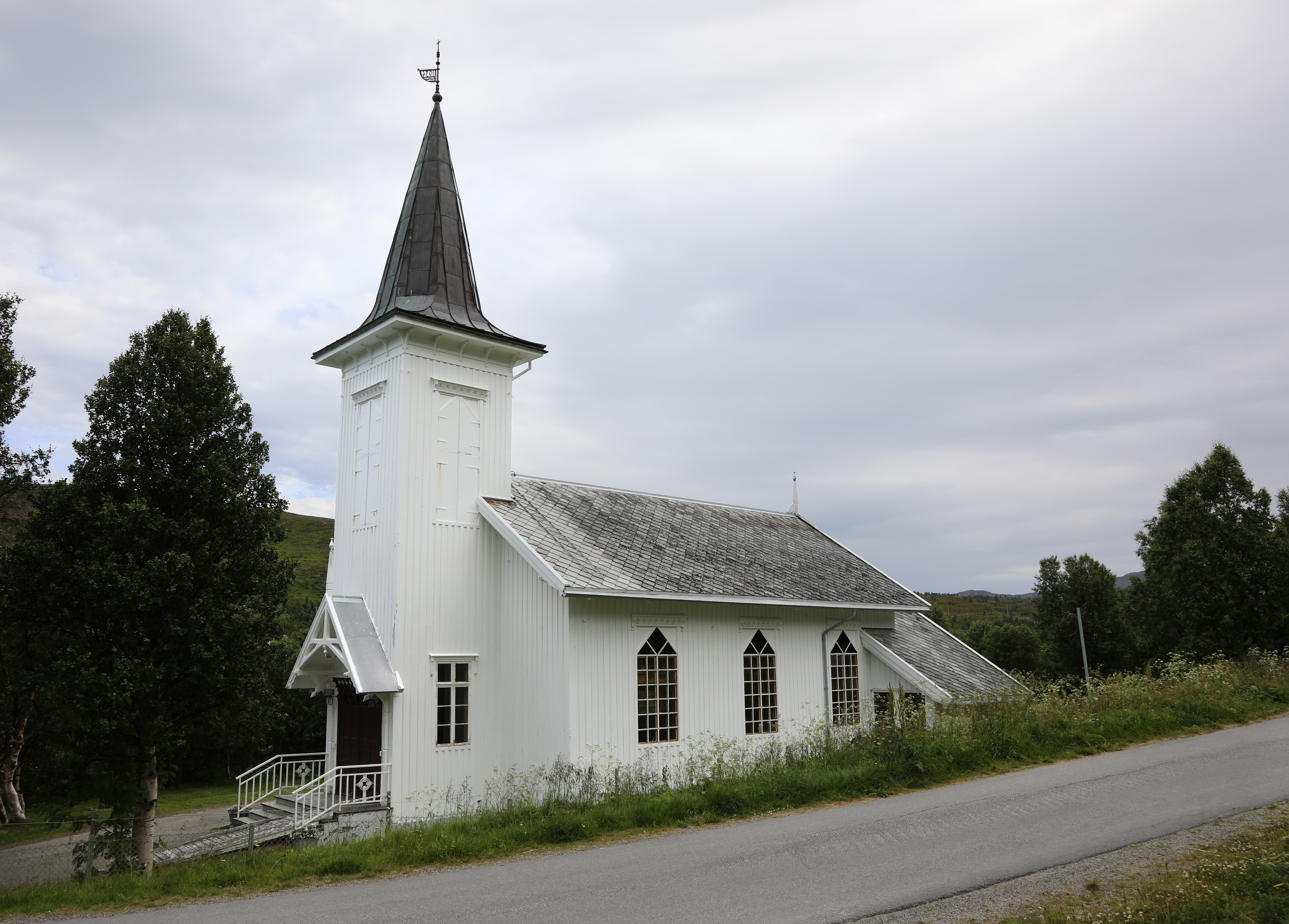
- View of the church
- Kvalsund Church
- 70.501711°N 23.977205°E
- Location: Hammerfest Municipality, Finnmark
- Country: Norway
- Denomination: Church of Norway
- Churchmanship: Evangelical Lutheran

History
- Status: Parish church
- Founded: 1736
- Consecrated: 1936

Architecture
- Functional status: Active
- Architect: Christian Thams
- Architectural type: Long church
- Completed: 1936 (90 years ago)

Specifications
- Capacity: 190
- Materials: Wood

Administration
- Diocese: Nord-Hålogaland
- Deanery: Hammerfest prosti
- Parish: Kvalsund
- Norwegian Cultural Heritage Site
- Type: Church
- Status: Listed
- ID: 84848

Kvalsund Church (Norwegian: Kvalsund kirke) is a parish church of the Church of Norway in Hammerfest Municipality in Finnmark county, Norway. It is located in the village of Kvalsund. It is the church for the Kvalsund parish which is part of the Hammerfest prosti (deanery) in the Diocese of Nord-Hålogaland. The white, wooden church was built in a long church style in 1936 using plans drawn up by the architect Christian Thams. The church seats about 190 people.

== History ==
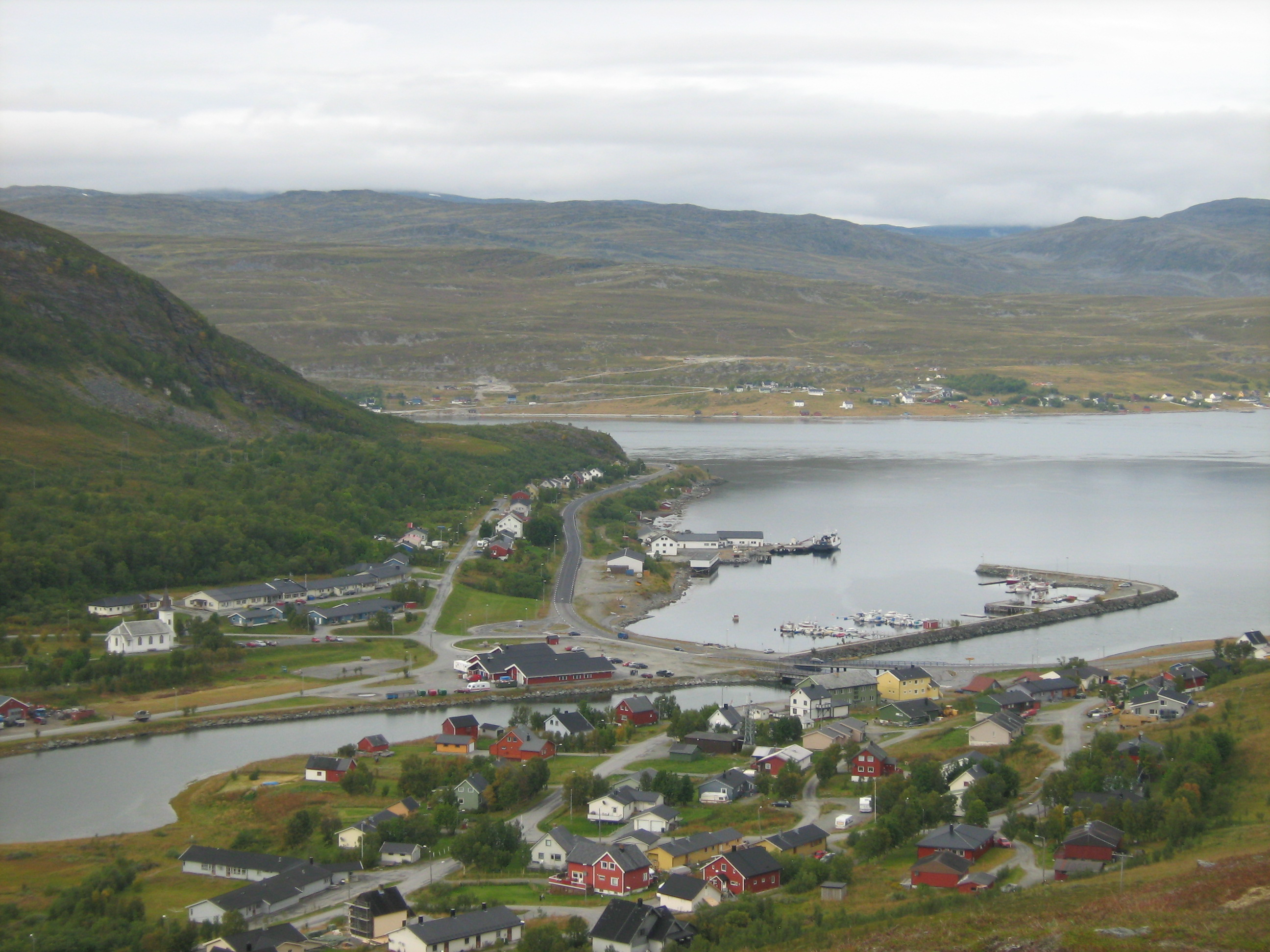
View of the church in the Kvalsund village (left side of picture) along the Kvalsundet strait

The first church in Kvalsund was built in 1763. The church stood here until 1892 when it was torn down and replaced with a new church on the same site. The new church was designed by the architect Christian Thams. The church was built on unstable ground, so in 1936, the church was taken down and rebuilt on the present site.

== See also ==
- List of churches in Nord-Hålogaland
