= World Heritage Rock Art Centre - Alta Museum =

Art museum in Finnmark, Norway

Coordinates: 69°56′50.9″N 23°11′11.6″E

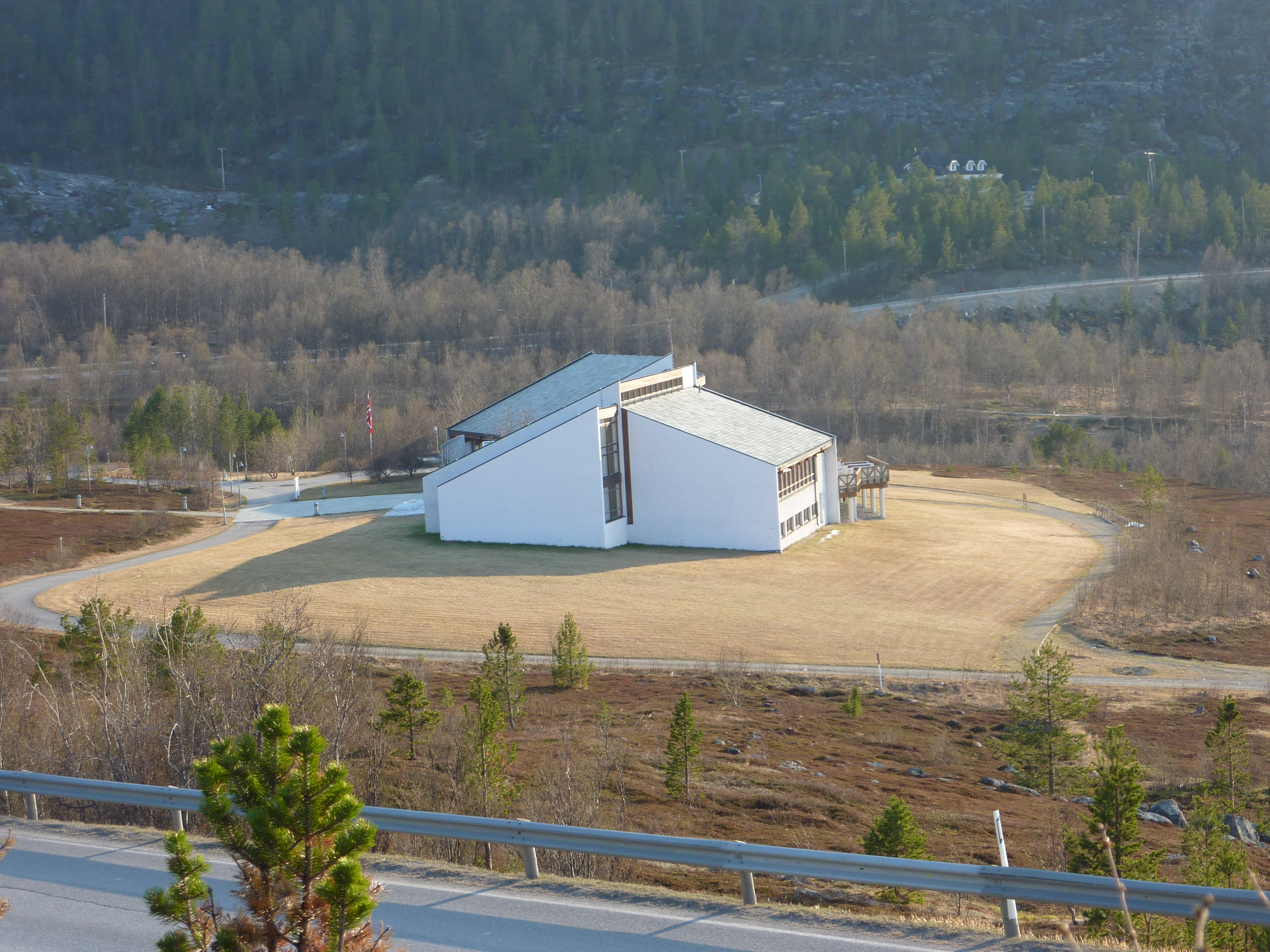
World Heritage Rock Art Centre - Alta Museum

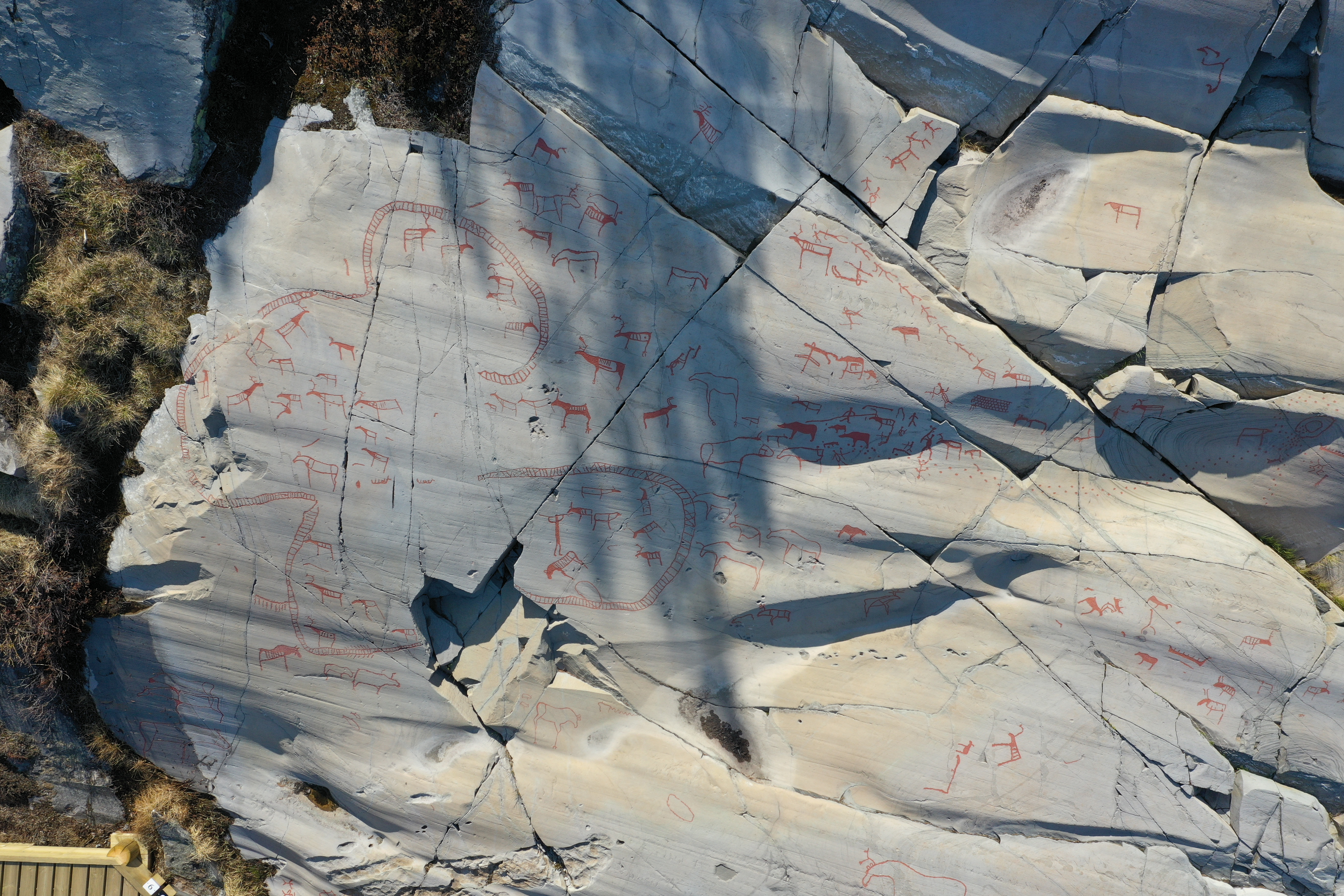
Rock carvings at the Alta Museum site

The World Heritage Rock Art Centre - Alta Museum (Verdensarvsenter for bergkunst – Alta Museum) is located in Alta Municipality in Finnmark county, Norway.

World Heritage Rock Art - Alta Museum is situated in Hjemmeluft, a small bay in the Altafjord at a site of early settlement of Finnmark dating from around 11,000 years ago. In 1973, the first rock carvings in Hjemmeluft were found. To date over 3,000 figures have been registered here. In the municipality as a whole over 6000 figures have been registered.

The museum opened in June 1991 and won the European Museum of the Year Award in 1993. Alta Museum is northern Norway's most-visited summer museum, with more than 1,000 visitors each day. It is the second most visited attraction in Finnmark County. It presents exhibitions on local culture and historic industries including the nearby prehistoric rock carvings that form a UNESCO World Heritage Site.
