= Juovvajávri =

Lake in Alta, Norway

Juovvajávri (Northern Sami) Urvannet (Norwegian)
- Interactive map of the lake
- Location: Alta, Finnmark
- Coordinates: 69.8034°N 24.0217°E
- Basin countries: Norway
- Max. length: 1.6 kilometres (0.99 mi)
- Max. width: 2 kilometres (1.2 mi)
- Surface area: 2.24 km^{2} (0.86 sq mi)
- Shore length^{1}: 7.57 kilometres (4.70 mi)
- Surface elevation: 515 metres (1,690 ft)
- References: NVE
- ^{1} Shore length is not a well-defined measure.

Juovvajávri (Northern Sami) or Urvannet (Norwegian) is a lake in Alta Municipality in Finnmark county, Norway. The 2.24-square-kilometre (0.86 sq mi) lake lies on the Finnmarksvidda plateau about 7 kilometres (4.3 mi) northeast of the lake Stuorajávri and about 7 kilometres (4.3 mi) northwest of the large lake Iešjávri.

== See also ==
- List of lakes in Norway
