= Stuorajávri (Alta) =

Lake in Alta, Norway

- Interactive map of the lake
- Location: Alta, Finnmark
- Coordinates: 69.7805°N 23.8126°E
- Basin countries: Norway
- Max. length: 5 kilometres (3.1 mi)
- Max. width: 1 kilometre (0.62 mi)
- Surface area: 3.58 km^{2} (1.38 sq mi)
- Shore length^{1}: 12.15 kilometres (7.55 mi)
- Surface elevation: 383 metres (1,257 ft)
- References: NVE
- ^{1} Shore length is not a well-defined measure.

Stuorajávri is a lake in Alta Municipality in Finnmark county, Norway. The 3.58-square-kilometre (1.38 sq mi) lake lies about 3.5 kilometres (2.2 mi) northeast of the Sautso canyon, along the Altaelva river, into which this lake eventually flows.

== See also ==
- List of lakes in Norway
