= Kovvatnet =

Kovvatnet may refer to the following locations:

- Kovvatnet, Finnmark, a lake in Alta Municipality in Finnmark county, Norway
- Kovvatnet, Telemark, a lake in Hjartdal Municipality in Telemark county, Norway
