= Altafjord =

Fjord in Alta Municipality in Finnmark county, Norway

- Altafjorden (Norwegian); Álttávuonna (Northern Sami); Alattionvuono (Kven)
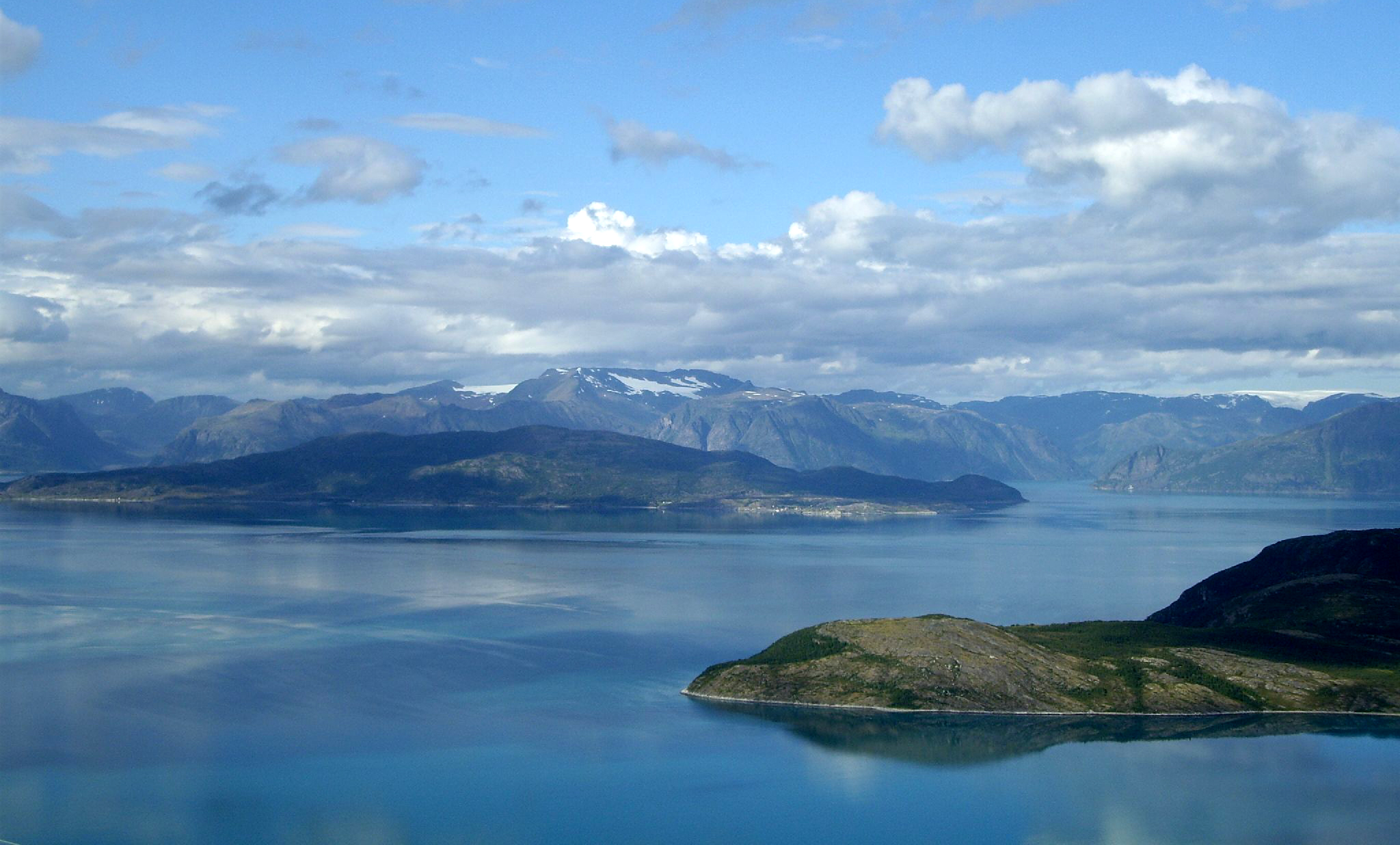
- View of the fjord

- Location of the fjord within Finnmark Location of the fjord within Norway
- Location: Finnmark county, Norway
- Coordinates: 69.9900°N 23.3242°E
- Type: Fjord
- Basin countries: Norway
- Max. length: 38 kilometres (24 mi)
- Islands: Årøya
- Settlements: Alta

The Altafjord (Norwegian: Altafjorden; Northern Sami: Álttávuonna; Kven: Alattionvuono) is a fjord in Alta Municipality in Finnmark county, Norway. The 38-kilometre (24 mi) long fjord stretches from the town of Alta in the south to the islands of Stjernøya and Seiland. The 200-kilometre (120 mi) long river Altaelva empties into the fjord at the town of Alta. At Stjernøya and Seiland islands, the fjord splits into two straits before emptying into the Norwegian Sea. Some of the larger side-branches off the main fjord include Langfjorden, Kåfjorden, and Korsfjorden.

The fjord was historically known as "Altenfjord", and was referred to as such by British historians throughout most of the 20th century.

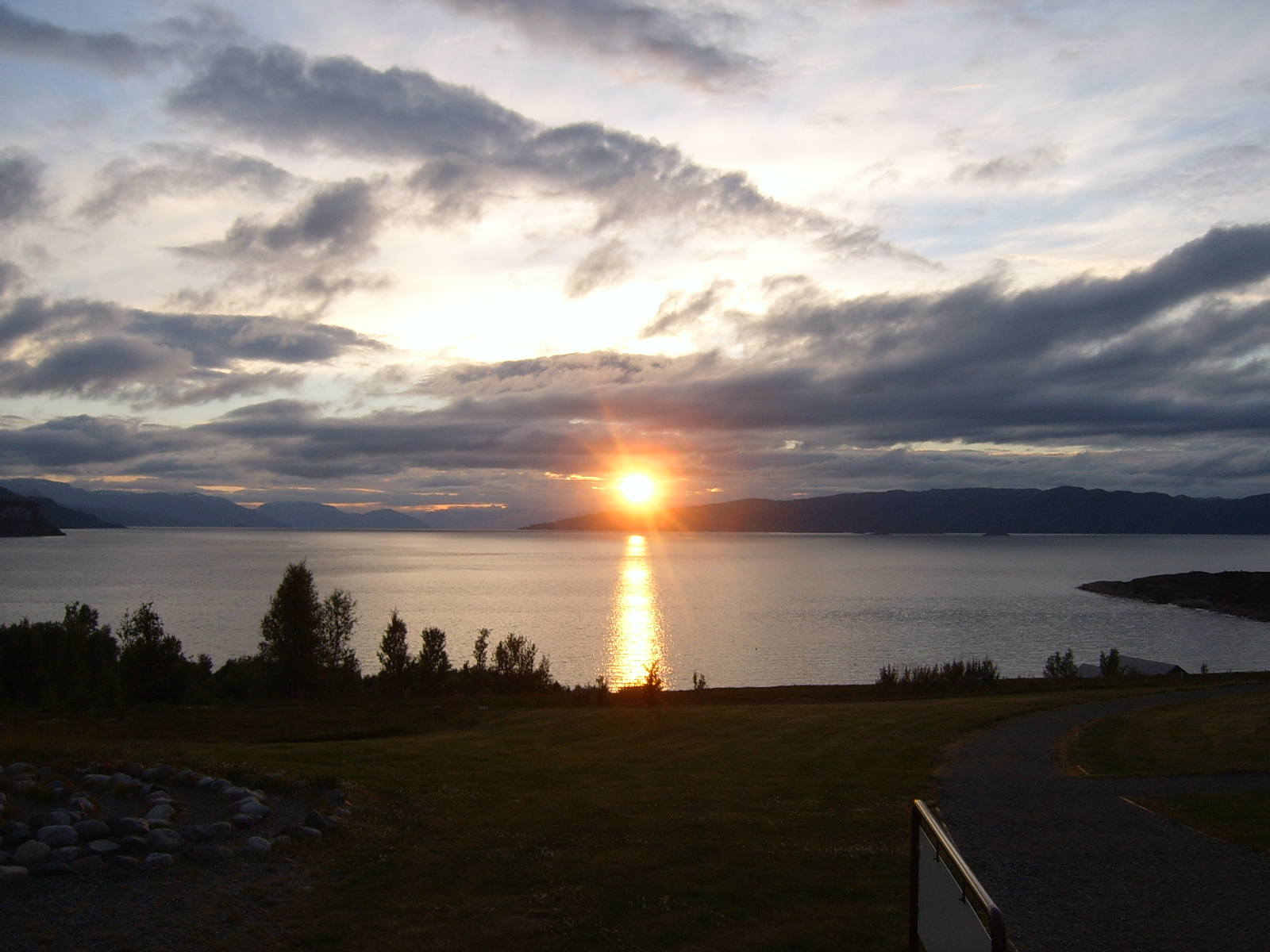
Midnight sun at the Altafjord

== History ==
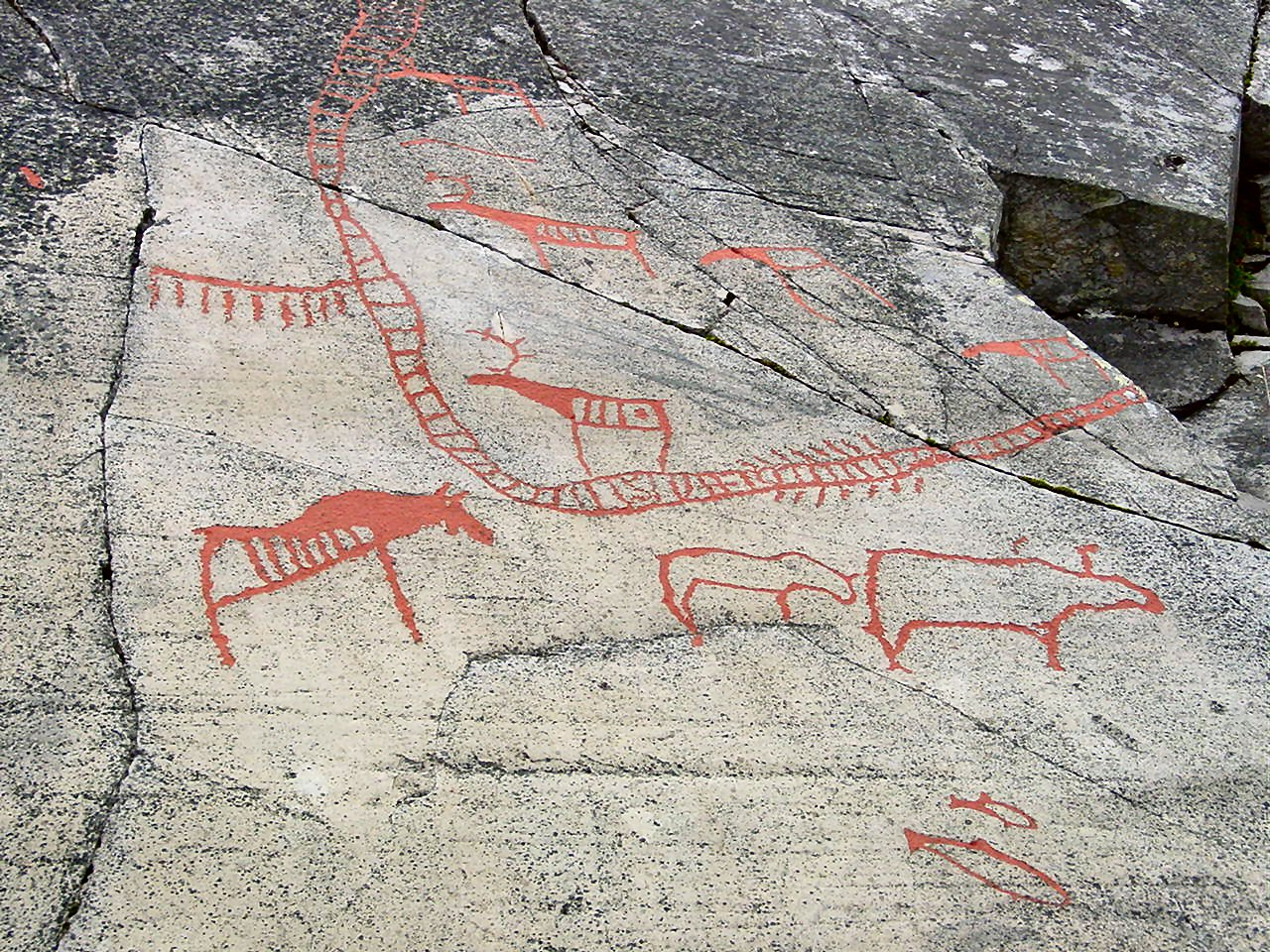
Petroglyphs

=== Prehistoric culture ===
A large number of prehistoric rock carvings have been found along the fjord, particularly at the bay Jiepmaluokta. These locations at Kåfjord, Jiepmaluokta, and Amtmannsnes are assigned a UNESCO World Heritage Site. The petroglyphs are dated from 4,200 BC to 500 BC, based on old shorelines and nearby prehistoric settlements.

=== World War II ===
During World War II there was a German naval base along the Kåfjorden, which branches off the main Altafjord. The German battleship Tirpitz was based at the village of Kåfjord (along the Kåfjorden). It was subject to attacks by British X class midget submarines in September 1943 (Operation Source), and in 1944 to air strikes in April (Operation Tungsten), July (Operation Mascot), August (Operation Goodwood), and September (Operation Paravane), after which Tirpitz was relocated to Tromsø, where a final bombing raid in November (Operation Catechism) sank the battleship.
