= Sautso =

Canyon in Alta, Norway

Coordinates: 69.766592°N 23.702939°E

Sautso (Northern Sami: Čávžu), also referred as Alta Canyon, is a canyon (valley) along the river Altaelva in Finnmark county, Norway. The valley is located in Alta Municipality, just north of the border with Kautokeino Municipality. The canyon is about 12 kilometres (7.5 mi) long and about 300 to 420 metres (980 to 1,380 ft) deep, making it the largest canyon of Northern Europe. The canyon begins just downstream (north) from the Alta Power Station. The river flows down from the Finnmarksvidda plateau (elevation: 450 metres or 1,480 feet) into the canyon (elevation: 90 metres or 300 feet), so the walls of the canyon clearly show many sedimentary layers.

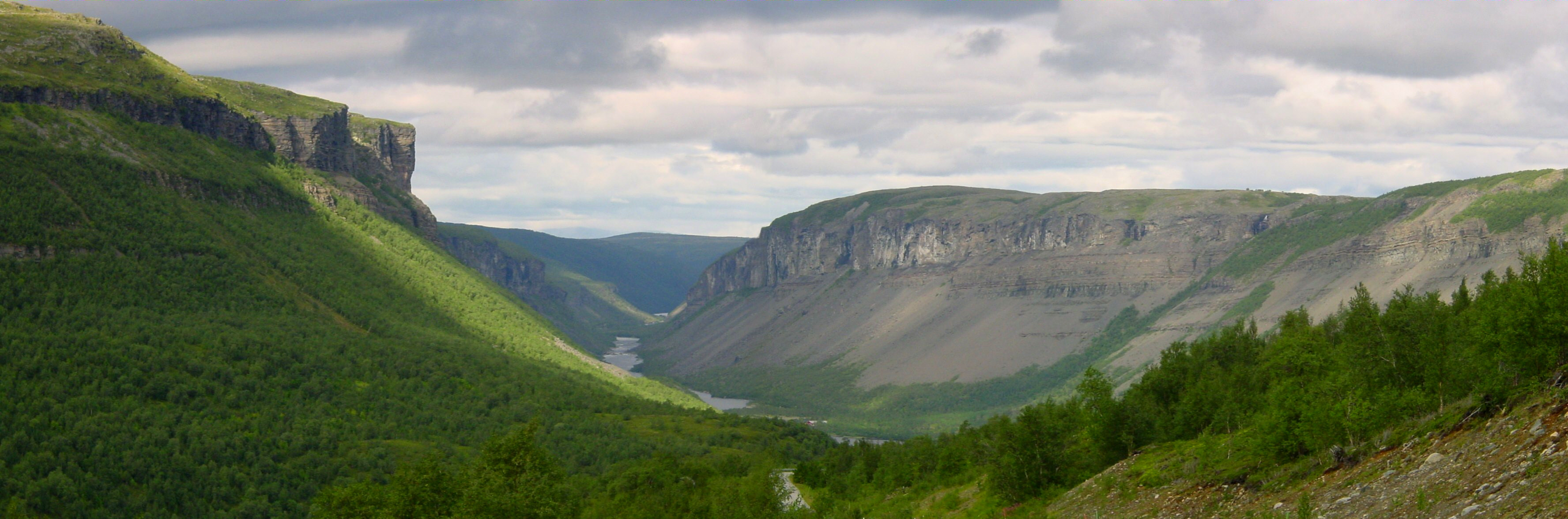
Panorama scenery of Alta canyon in 2004
