= Kovvannet =

Lake in Alta, Norway

Buođgajávri (Northern Sami) Kovvannet (Norwegian)
- Interactive map of the lake
- Location: Alta, Finnmark
- Coordinates: 70.1215°N 22.7424°E
- Basin countries: Norway
- Max. length: 3.5 kilometres (2.2 mi)
- Max. width: 1 kilometre (0.62 mi)
- Surface area: 2.48 km^{2} (0.96 sq mi)
- Shore length^{1}: 9.74 kilometres (6.05 mi)
- Surface elevation: 118 metres (387 ft)
- References: NVE
- ^{1} Shore length is not a well-defined measure.

Kovvannet (Norwegian) or Buođgajávri (Northern Sami) is a lake in Alta Municipality in Finnmark county, Norway. It is located on the mainland, immediately north of the Langfjorden and about 6 kilometres (3.7 mi) straight east of the village of Øksfjordbotn (in Loppa Municipality). The lake has two small dams on the southeast end of the lake. The dams are part of a hydroelectric power plant, located just east of the lake.

== See also ==
- List of lakes in Norway
