= Kåfjord Church (Finnmark) =

- Kåfjord kirke
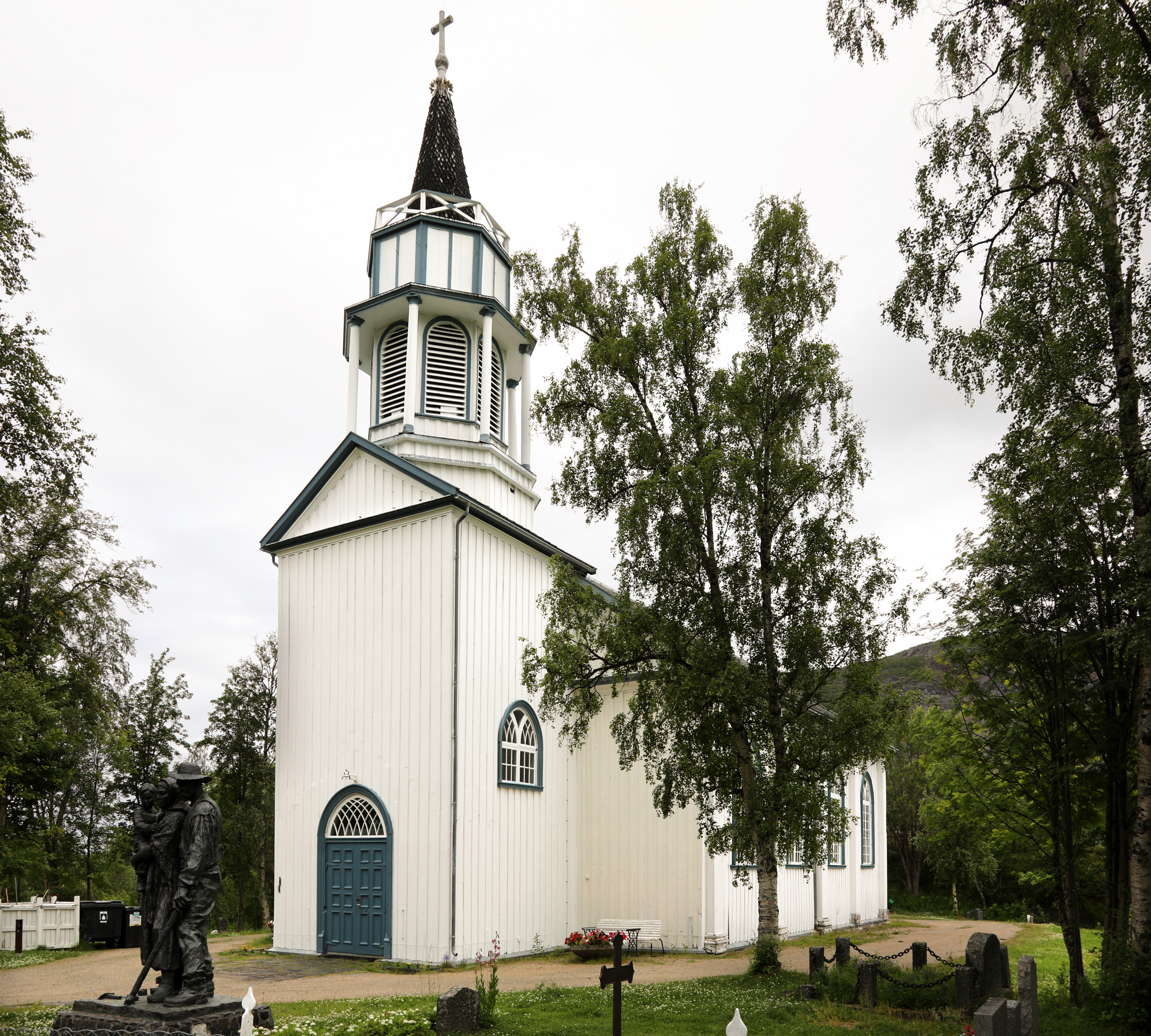
- View of the church
- Kåfjord Church
- 69.934102°N 23.026130°E
- Location: Alta Municipality, Finnmark
- Country: Norway
- Denomination: Church of Norway
- Churchmanship: Evangelical Lutheran

History
- Status: Parish church
- Founded: 1837
- Consecrated: 10 Sept 1837

Architecture
- Functional status: Active
- Architectural type: Long church
- Completed: 1837 (189 years ago)

Specifications
- Capacity: 300
- Materials: Wood

Administration
- Diocese: Nord-Hålogaland
- Deanery: Alta prosti
- Parish: Alta
- Norwegian Cultural Heritage Site
- Type: Church
- Status: Listed
- ID: 84878

Kåfjord Church (Norwegian: Kåfjord kirke) is a parish church of the Church of Norway in Alta Municipality in Finnmark county, Norway. It is located in the village of Kåfjord. It is an annex church for the Alta parish which is part of the Alta prosti (deanery) in the Diocese of Nord-Hålogaland. The white, wooden church was built in a long church style in 1837 using plans drawn up by an unknown architect, making it the oldest surviving church building in Alta. The church seats about 300 people.

== History ==
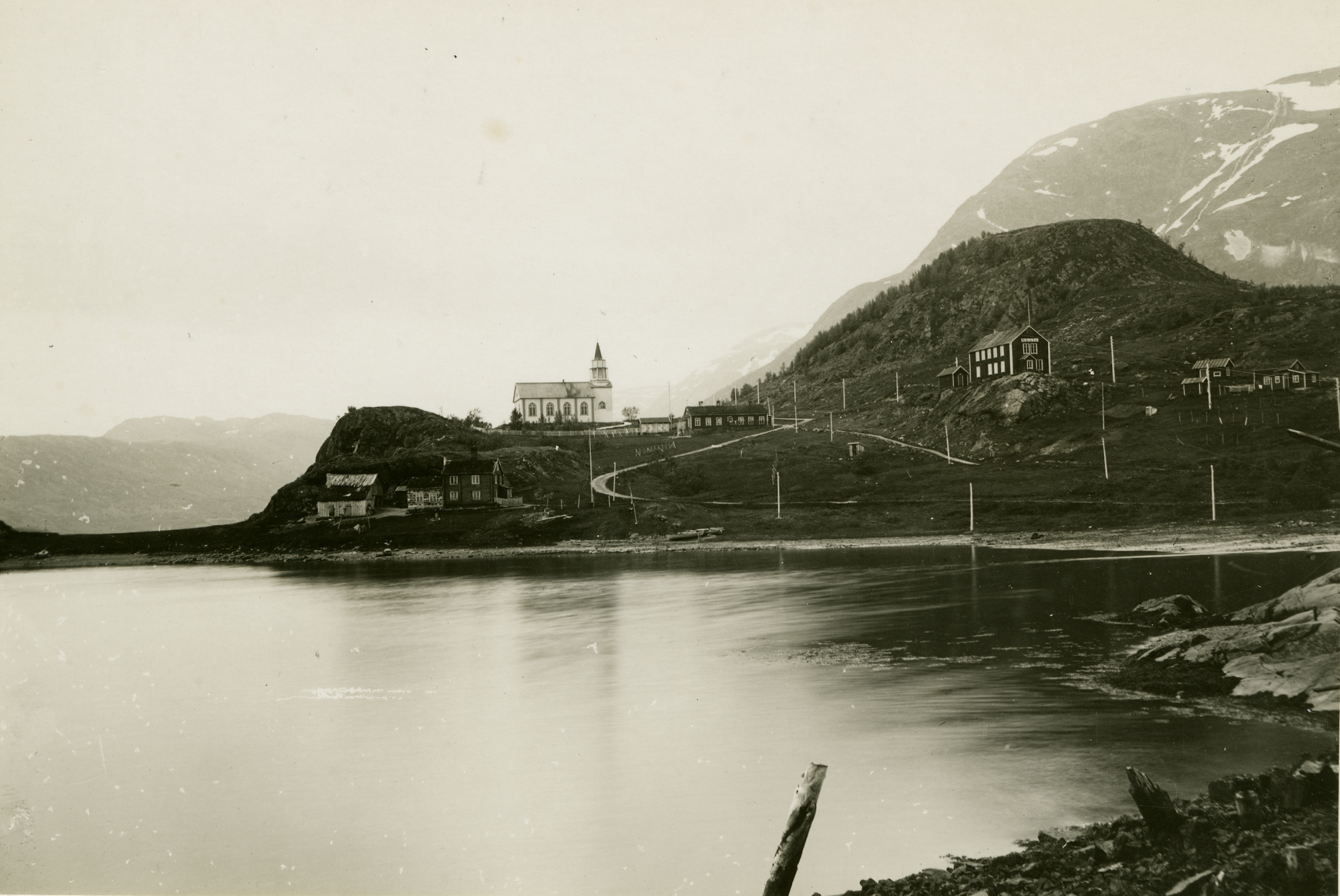
View of the church from a distance

The local Kåfjord copperworks, which was established in Kåfjord in 1826, grew to become the largest industrial company at the time north of the Arctic Circle. The church was built in 1837 to serve the growing community. The architect is unknown, but the church has many similarities to the standardized church drawings by the national architect Hans Linstow, so it could have been based on those. Other sources say that it may have been Stephen Henry Thomas. The building was consecrated on 10 September 1837 by the Bishop Peder Kjerschow. During the 1930s, the church was renovated and restored.

In 1967, there was a fire in the chimney for the wood stove in the church, so the church was temporarily closed. An extensive renovation and repair work was carried out from 1968 to 1970. As part of this restoration, the church received a new organ in 1970.

== See also ==
- List of churches in Nord-Hålogaland
