= Alta Municipality =

Municipality in Finnmark, Norway

Alta Municipality Alta kommune Álttá gielda (Northern Sami) Alattion komuuni (Kven)
- Municipality
- Alten herred (historic name)
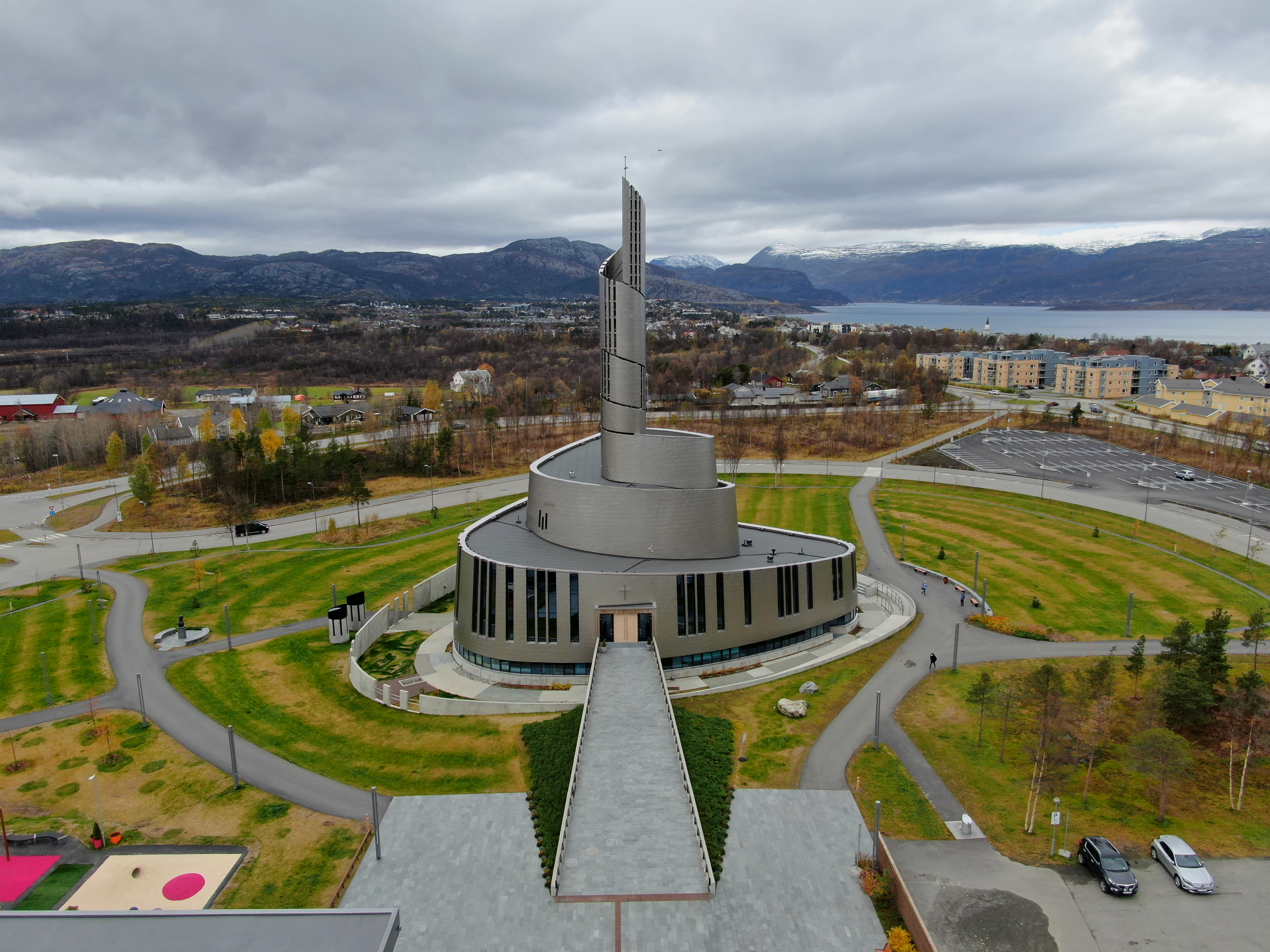
- The Northern light cathedral and part of town

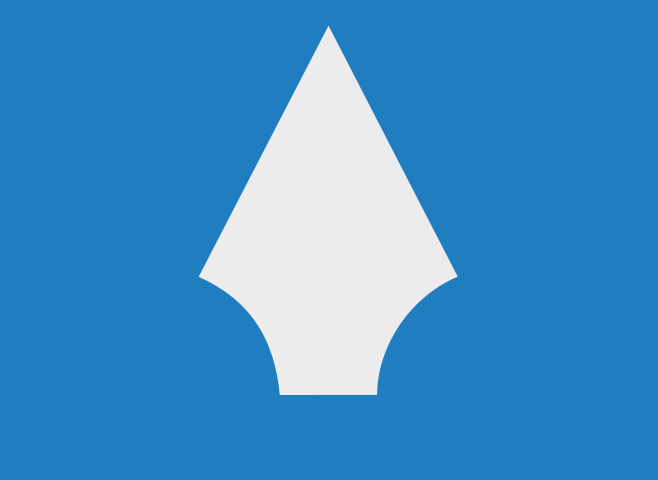
- Flag Coat of arms

- Finnmark within Norway

- Alta within Finnmark
- Coordinates: 69°58′8″N 23°16′18″E
- Country: Norway
- County: Finnmark
- District: Vest-Finnmark
- Established: 1 January 1863
  - Preceded by: Alten-Talvig Municipality
- Administrative centre: Alta

Government
  - Mayor (2015): Monica Nielsen (Ap)

Area
  - Total: 3,848.82 km^{2} (1,486.04 sq mi)
  - Land: 3,651.33 km^{2} (1,409.79 sq mi)
  - Water: 197.49 km^{2} (76.25 sq mi) 5.1%
  - Rank: #7 in Norway
- Highest elevation: 1,149 m (3,770 ft)

Population (2025)
  - Total: 21,708
  - Rank: #59 in Norway
  - Density: 5.6/km^{2} (15/sq mi)
  - Change (10 years): ▲ +9.5%
- Demonym: Altaværing

Official language
  - Norwegian form: Bokmål
- Time zone: UTC+01:00 (CET)
  - Summer (DST): UTC+02:00 (CEST)
- ISO 3166 code: NO-5601
- Website: Official website

Alta (Norwegian: [ˈɑ̂ɫtɑ]; Northern Sami: Áltá [ˈaːlːhtaː]; (Note: Formerly, Álaheadju was used as the Northern Sámi name. This reflects the dialect of the Inland Sámi, while Áltá is the name in the original Sámi dialect of the area.) Kven: Alattio; Finnish: Alattio) is the largest populated municipality in Finnmark county, Norway. The administrative centre of the municipality is the town of Alta. Some of the main villages in the municipality include Kåfjord, Komagfjord, Kvenvik, Langfjordbotn, Leirbotn, Rafsbotn, Talvik, and Tverrelvdalen.

The town of Alta and most of the municipality is located just below the 70th latitude and is closer to the North Pole than it is to much of Central Europe and the British Isles. The town is the northernmost settlement of urban significance in the European Economic Area, with municipalities north of Alta being sparsely populated. In spite of its high latitude the local climate is seldom severely cold thanks to Gulf Stream moderation in the prevailing wind, and lower altitudes of the municipality are covered with boreal forests. Due to Norway curving above its Nordic neighbours, Alta is located further east than almost all of Sweden and much of southern Finland. Being at a very high latitude, midnight sun and polar night are present for sizeable parts of the year.

The 3,849-square-kilometre (1,486 sq mi) municipality is the 6th largest municipality by area out of the 357 municipalities in Norway. Alta is the 59th most populous municipality in Norway with a population of 22,074. The municipality's population density is 5.7 inhabitants per square kilometre (15/sq mi) and its population has increased by 9.5% over the previous 10-year period.

== General information ==
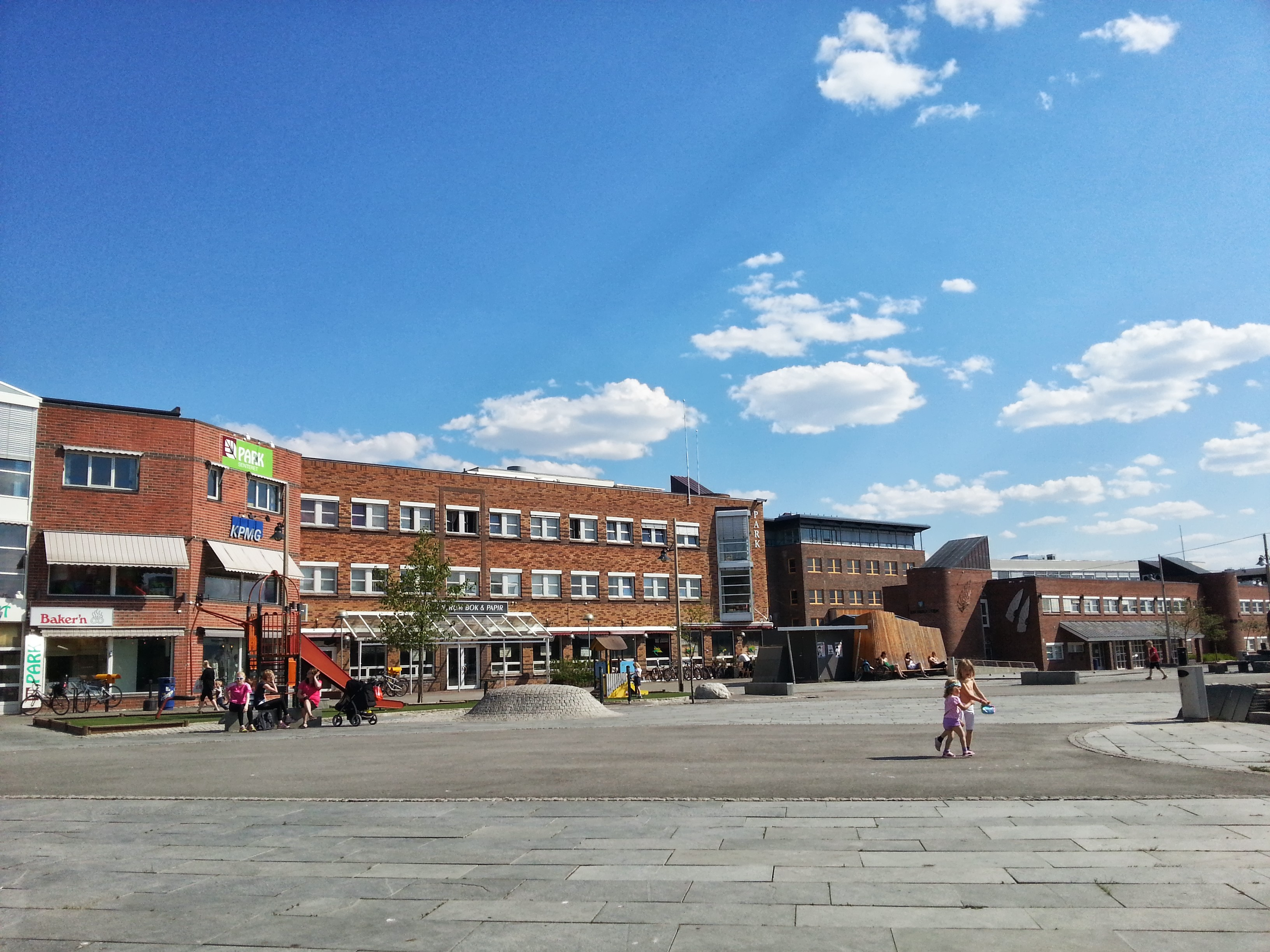
Alta Sentrum

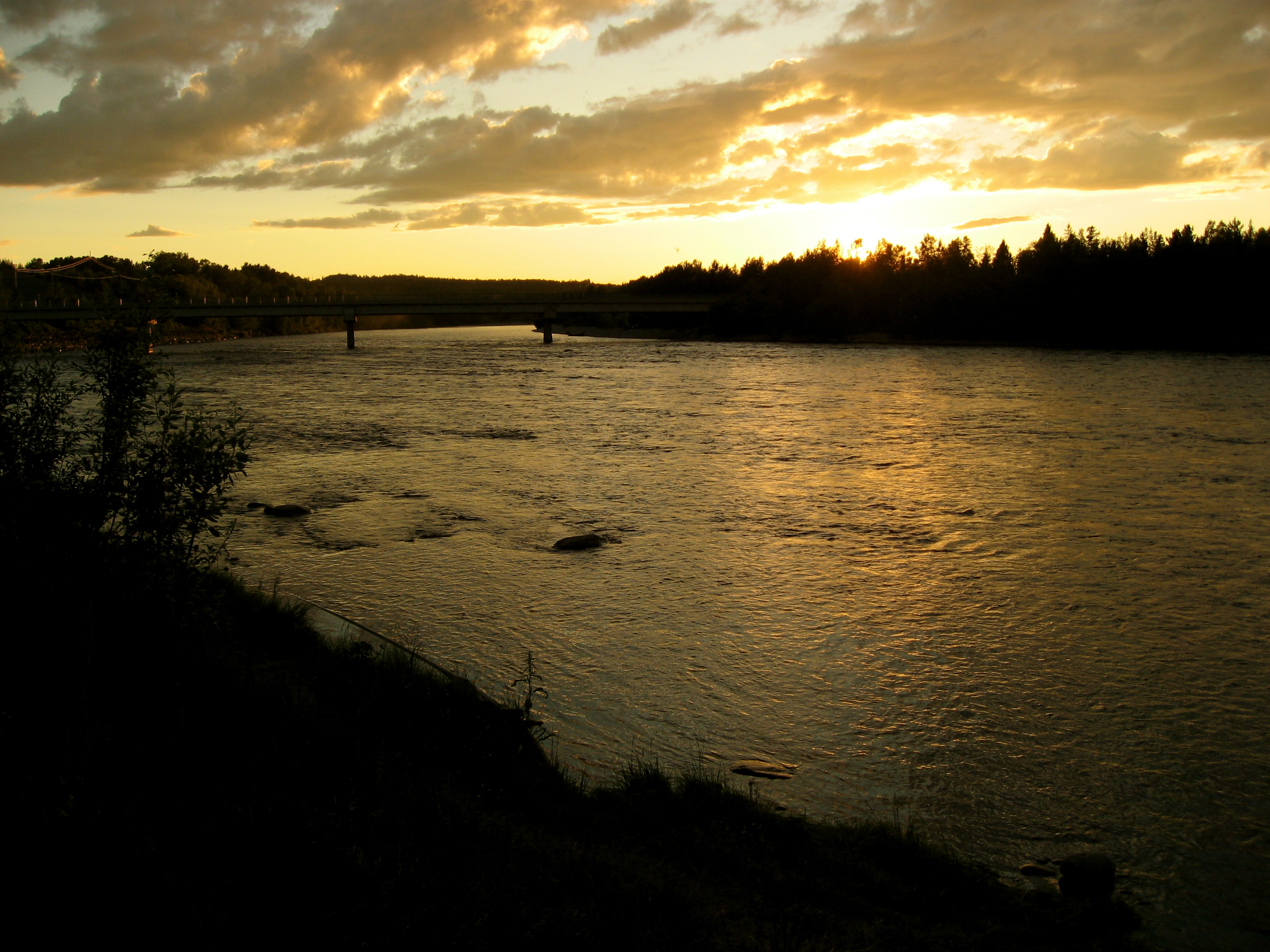
Alta River

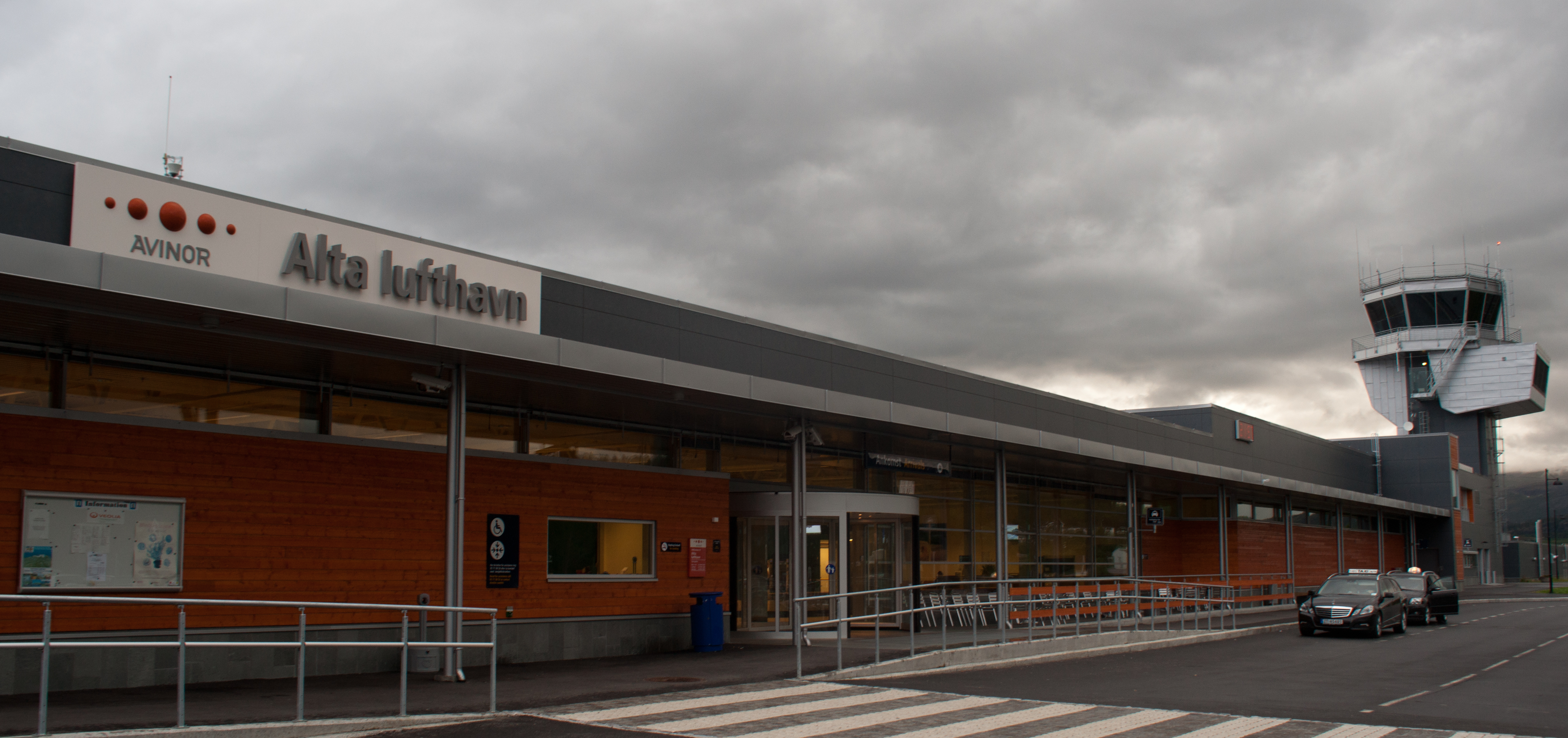
Alta Airport

The old Alten-Talvig Municipality was established on 1 January 1838 (see formannskapsdistrikt law). Not long afterwards, on 1 January 1863, it was divided into two: Talvik Municipality to the north (population: 1,938) and Alta Municipality to the south (population: 2,442). On 1 January 1964, the two neighboring municipalities were merged back together to form a new Alta Municipality. Prior to the merger, Alta had 6,629 residents and Talvik had 3,266 residents. The borders have not changed since that time.

On 1 January 2020, the municipality became part of the newly formed Troms og Finnmark county. Previously, it had been part of the old Finnmark county. On 1 January 2024, the Troms og Finnmark county was divided and the municipality once again became part of Finnmark county.

=== Name ===
The municipality (originally the parish) is named after the local Altafjorden. The name possibly comes from the Old Norse words ǫlpt or alpt which refer to a swan. It could also be the Norwegianization of the Finnish word (alaattia) which refers to a "lowland". Historically, the name of the municipality was spelled Alten. On 3 November 1917, a royal resolution changed the spelling of the name of the municipality to Alta.

=== Coat of arms ===
The coat of arms was granted on 9 July 1976. The official blazon is "Azure, a spearhead argent" (Norwegian: I blått en hvit spydspiss). This means the arms have a blue field (background) and the charge is a spear head. The spear head has a tincture of argent which means it is commonly colored white, but if it is made out of metal, then silver is used. The blue color in the field symbolizes the local river, sea, and mountains. The spear head is derived from the findings of quartzite spear heads dating back to the late Stone Age and found in the area. The quartzite was quarried in the municipality and tools made from it were used all over Northern Norway.

=== Churches ===
The Church of Norway has two parishes (sokn) within Alta Municipality. It is part of the Alta prosti (deanery) in the Diocese of Nord-Hålogaland.

Churches in Alta Municipality
Parish (sokn)	Church name	Location of the church	Year built
Alta	Alta Church	Alta	1858
Alta	Elvebakken Church	Alta	1964
Alta	Kåfjord Church	Kåfjord	1837
Alta	Northern Lights Cathedral	Alta	2013
Alta	Rafsbotn Chapel	Rafsbotn	1989
Talvik	Komagfjord Church	Komagfjord	1960
Talvik	Langfjord Church	Langfjordbotn	1891
Talvik	Leirbotn Church	Leirbotn	1993
Talvik	Talvik Church	Talvik	1883

== History ==
The rock carvings at Alta, located near the Jiepmaluokta bay, dating from c. 7000 BC to 500 BC, are on the UNESCO list of World Heritage Sites. The Komsa culture was named after Komsa Mountain in Alta municipality, where the first archeological remains of this culture were discovered.

In the aftermath of the Sami Kautokeino rebellion of 1852, rebel leaders Mons Aslaksen Somby and Aslak Jacobsen Hætta were decapitated at Elvebakken in what is now the town of Alta on 14 October 1854.

Their bodies were buried in graves just outside the Kåfjord Church graveyard in the village of Kåfjord in Alta, but their heads were sent on to the Anatomisk Institute at the University of Oslo, where they were kept for more than a century as part of the university's skull collections. The two skulls were only relinquished by the university in 1985, following a controversy and protests by Sami activists, and were in November 1997 buried at the Kåfjord Church in Alta, at the same spot as their bodies were buried over 140 years earlier.

During World War II, the German battleship Tirpitz used the Kåfjorden, an arm of Altafjorden, as a harbour, and was damaged here by attacking Allied warplanes. The town Alta was seriously destroyed by fire near the end of the World War II. It was rebuilt in subsequent years.

The Altasaken in 1979 made headlines for weeks, as many people (especially Sami people and environmentalists) demonstrated and used civil disobedience to prevent the building of a dam on the river Altaelva in order to produce hydropower. The dam was built, however, and the river still offers good salmon fishing. The King of Norway usually visits the river once in the summer to fish.

The urban area made up of Bossekop, Elvebakken, and Bukta, also known collectively now as the town of Alta, became a town on 1 January 2000. The population has been growing steadily for many years.

On 31 August 2019, a sightseeing helicopter crashed in the mountains of Skoddevarre south of Alta.

== Government ==
Alta Municipality is responsible for primary education (through 10th grade), outpatient health services, senior citizen services, welfare and other social services, zoning, economic development, and municipal roads and utilities. The municipality is governed by a municipal council of directly elected representatives. The mayor is indirectly elected by a vote of the municipal council. The municipality is under the jurisdiction of the Vestre Finnmark District Court and the Hålogaland Court of Appeal.

=== Municipal council ===
The municipal council (Kommunestyre) of Alta Municipality is made up of 35 representatives that are elected to four year terms. The tables below show the current and historical composition of the council by political party.

Alta kommunestyre 2023–2027
Party name (in Norwegian)	Number of representatives
Labour Party (Arbeiderpartiet)	7
Progress Party (Fremskrittspartiet)	9
Green Party (Miljøpartiet De Grønne)	1
Conservative Party (Høyre)	4
The Conservatives (Konservativt)	1
Christian Democratic Party (Kristelig Folkeparti)	1
Norway Democrats (Norgesdemokratene)	1
Red Party (Rødt)	2
Centre Party (Senterpartiet)	2
Socialist Left Party (Sosialistisk Venstreparti)	3
Liberal Party (Venstre)	4
Total number of members:	35

Alta kommunestyre 2019–2023
Party name (in Norwegian)	Number of representatives
Labour Party (Arbeiderpartiet)	9
Progress Party (Fremskrittspartiet)	7
Green Party (Miljøpartiet De Grønne)	1
Conservative Party (Høyre)	3
Christian Democratic Party (Kristelig Folkeparti)	1
Red Party (Rødt)	2
Centre Party (Senterpartiet)	5
Socialist Left Party (Sosialistisk Venstreparti)	4
Liberal Party (Venstre)	3
Total number of members:	35

Alta kommunestyre 2015–2019
Party name (in Norwegian)	Number of representatives
Labour Party (Arbeiderpartiet)	11
Progress Party (Fremskrittspartiet)	7
Green Party (Miljøpartiet De Grønne)	1
Conservative Party (Høyre)	4
Christian Democratic Party (Kristelig Folkeparti)	2
Coastal Party (Kystpartiet)	2
Centre Party (Senterpartiet)	1
Socialist Left Party (Sosialistisk Venstreparti)	3
Liberal Party (Venstre)	4
Total number of members:	35

Alta kommunestyre 2011–2015
Party name (in Norwegian)	Number of representatives
Labour Party (Arbeiderpartiet)	10
Progress Party (Fremskrittspartiet)	4
Conservative Party (Høyre)	10
Christian Democratic Party (Kristelig Folkeparti)	1
Coastal Party (Kystpartiet)	4
Socialist Left Party (Sosialistisk Venstreparti)	3
Liberal Party (Venstre)	3
Total number of members:	35

Alta kommunestyre 2007–2011
Party name (in Norwegian)	Number of representatives
Labour Party (Arbeiderpartiet)	15
Progress Party (Fremskrittspartiet)	8
Conservative Party (Høyre)	2
Christian Democratic Party (Kristelig Folkeparti)	2
Coastal Party (Kystpartiet)	1
Centre Party (Senterpartiet)	1
Socialist Left Party (Sosialistisk Venstreparti)	4
Liberal Party (Venstre)	2
Total number of members:	35

Alta kommunestyre 2003–2007
Party name (in Norwegian)	Number of representatives
Labour Party (Arbeiderpartiet)	14
Progress Party (Fremskrittspartiet)	5
Conservative Party (Høyre)	3
Christian Democratic Party (Kristelig Folkeparti)	2
Coastal Party (Kystpartiet)	1
Red Electoral Alliance (Rød Valgallianse)	1
Centre Party (Senterpartiet)	2
Socialist Left Party (Sosialistisk Venstreparti)	6
Liberal Party (Venstre)	1
Total number of members:	35

Alta kommunestyre 1999–2003
Party name (in Norwegian)	Number of representatives
Labour Party (Arbeiderpartiet)	13
Progress Party (Fremskrittspartiet)	4
Conservative Party (Høyre)	5
Christian Democratic Party (Kristelig Folkeparti)	3
Centre Party (Senterpartiet)	1
Socialist Left Party (Sosialistisk Venstreparti)	4
Liberal Party (Venstre)	2
Joint list of the Red Electoral Alliance (Rød Valgallianse) and the Communist Party (Kommunistiske Parti)	1
Local Democratic List (Lokaldemokratisk liste)	2
Total number of members:	35

Alta kommunestyre 1995–1999
Party name (in Norwegian)	Number of representatives
Labour Party (Arbeiderpartiet)	19
Conservative Party (Høyre)	5
Christian Democratic Party (Kristelig Folkeparti)	5
Red Electoral Alliance (Rød Valgallianse)	3
Centre Party (Senterpartiet)	4
Socialist Left Party (Sosialistisk Venstreparti)	6
Liberal Party (Venstre)	3
Total number of members:	45

Alta kommunestyre 1991–1995
Party name (in Norwegian)	Number of representatives
Labour Party (Arbeiderpartiet)	18
Conservative Party (Høyre)	7
Christian Democratic Party (Kristelig Folkeparti)	3
Red Electoral Alliance (Rød Valgallianse)	2
Centre Party (Senterpartiet)	4
Socialist Left Party (Sosialistisk Venstreparti)	8
Liberal Party (Venstre)	3
Total number of members:	45

Alta kommunestyre 1987–1991
Party name (in Norwegian)	Number of representatives
Labour Party (Arbeiderpartiet)	26
Progress Party (Fremskrittspartiet)	2
Conservative Party (Høyre)	5
Communist Party (Kommunistiske Parti)	1
Christian Democratic Party (Kristelig Folkeparti)	3
Red Electoral Alliance (Rød Valgallianse)	1
Centre Party (Senterpartiet)	1
Socialist Left Party (Sosialistisk Venstreparti)	3
Liberal Party (Venstre)	3
Total number of members:	45

Alta kommunestyre 1983–1987
Party name (in Norwegian)	Number of representatives
Labour Party (Arbeiderpartiet)	21
Progress Party (Fremskrittspartiet)	1
Conservative Party (Høyre)	8
Communist Party (Kommunistiske Parti)	2
Christian Democratic Party (Kristelig Folkeparti)	4
Centre Party (Senterpartiet)	1
Socialist Left Party (Sosialistisk Venstreparti)	3
Liberal Party (Venstre)	4
Local list for Western Alta (Kretsliste for Vestre Alta)	1
Total number of members:	45

Alta kommunestyre 1979–1983
Party name (in Norwegian)	Number of representatives
Labour Party (Arbeiderpartiet)	16
Conservative Party (Høyre)	9
Communist Party (Kommunistiske Parti)	3
Christian Democratic Party (Kristelig Folkeparti)	5
Centre Party (Senterpartiet)	2
Socialist Left Party (Sosialistisk Venstreparti)	3
Liberal Party (Venstre)	7
Total number of members:	45

Alta kommunestyre 1975–1979
Party name (in Norwegian)	Number of representatives
Labour Party (Arbeiderpartiet)	18
Conservative Party (Høyre)	5
Christian Democratic Party (Kristelig Folkeparti)	6
Centre Party (Senterpartiet)	4
Socialist Left Party (Sosialistisk Venstreparti)	8
Liberal Party (Venstre)	4
Total number of members:	45

Alta kommunestyre 1971–1975
Party name (in Norwegian)	Number of representatives
Labour Party (Arbeiderpartiet)	19
Conservative Party (Høyre)	4
Christian Democratic Party (Kristelig Folkeparti)	4
Centre Party (Senterpartiet)	2
Liberal Party (Venstre)	3
Local List(s) (Lokale lister)	3
Socialist common list (Venstresosialistiske felleslister)	10
Total number of members:	45

Alta kommunestyre 1967–1971
Party name (in Norwegian)	Number of representatives
Labour Party (Arbeiderpartiet)	24
Conservative Party (Høyre)	4
Communist Party (Kommunistiske Parti)	6
Christian Democratic Party (Kristelig Folkeparti)	3
Centre Party (Senterpartiet)	2
Socialist People's Party (Sosialistisk Folkeparti)	3
Liberal Party (Venstre)	3
Total number of members:	45

Alta kommunestyre 1963–1967
Party name (in Norwegian)	Number of representatives
Labour Party (Arbeiderpartiet)	24
Conservative Party (Høyre)	6
Communist Party (Kommunistiske Parti)	8
Christian Democratic Party (Kristelig Folkeparti)	4
Liberal Party (Venstre)	3
Total number of members:	45
Note: On 1 January 1964, Talvik Municipality became part of Alta Municipality.

Alta herredsstyre 1959–1963
Party name (in Norwegian)	Number of representatives
Labour Party (Arbeiderpartiet)	14
Conservative Party (Høyre)	3
Communist Party (Kommunistiske Parti)	11
Liberal Party (Venstre)	3
Total number of members:	31

Alta herredsstyre 1955–1959
Party name (in Norwegian)	Number of representatives
Labour Party (Arbeiderpartiet)	14
Conservative Party (Høyre)	4
Communist Party (Kommunistiske Parti)	10
Liberal Party (Venstre)	3
Total number of members:	31

Alta herredsstyre 1951–1955
Party name (in Norwegian)	Number of representatives
Labour Party (Arbeiderpartiet)	8
Communist Party (Kommunistiske Parti)	8
Joint List(s) of Non-Socialist Parties (Borgerlige Felleslister)	4
Total number of members:	20

Alta herredsstyre 1947–1951
Party name (in Norwegian)	Number of representatives
Labour Party (Arbeiderpartiet)	7
Communist Party (Kommunistiske Parti)	8
Christian Democratic Party (Kristelig Folkeparti)	1
Joint List(s) of Non-Socialist Parties (Borgerlige Felleslister)	4
Total number of members:	20

Alta herredsstyre 1945–1947
Party name (in Norwegian)	Number of representatives
Labour Party (Arbeiderpartiet)	6
Communist Party (Kommunistiske Parti)	11
Local List(s) (Lokale lister)	3
Total number of members:	20

Alta herredsstyre 1937–1941*
Party name (in Norwegian)	Number of representatives
Labour Party (Arbeiderpartiet)	6
Communist Party (Kommunistiske Parti)	6
Liberal Party (Venstre)	3
Joint list of the Conservative Party (Høyre) and the Free-minded People's Party (Frisinnede Folkeparti)	4
List of workers, fishermen, and small farmholders (Arbeidere, fiskere, småbrukere liste)	1
Total number of members:	20
Note: Due to the German occupation of Norway during World War II, no elections were held for new municipal councils until after the war ended in 1945.

=== Mayors ===
The mayor (Norwegian: ordfører) of Alta Municipality is the political leader of the municipality and the chairperson of the municipal council. Here is a list of people who have held this position:

- 1864–1865: Lars Follum
- 1868–1871: Jørgen Næss
- 1872–1875: O. Furu
- 1876–1879: Lars Follum
- 1880–1883: Lorents Holmgren
- 1887–1890: Hjalmar C. Borchrevink
- 1891–1901: Axel O. Hagemann
- 1902–1903: O. Andersen
- 1904–1904: Ole Sætrum (acting)
- 1905–1907: August Nielsen
- 1908–1913: Hans Rusten
- 1914–1914: B. Siqveland
- 1915–1916: Waldemar Johansen
- 1917–1919: Kristian Heitmann (NSA)
- 1920–1922: Hans Rusten (H)
- 1922–1924: Johan Martin Mjøen (V)
- 1925–1925: B. K. Ottem (H)
- 1926–1928: Kristian Heitmann (NSA)
- 1929–1931: Paul Kjeldsberg (Ap)
- 1932–1934: Paul Tangen (LL)
- 1935–1937: B. Torbergsen (Ap)
- 1937–1940: William Granaas (NKP)
- 1941–1942: Odd Cappelen (NS)
- 1942–1944: Sverre A. Lyng (NS)
- 1945–1947: William Granaas (NKP)
- 1948–1951: Daniel Heitmann (Ap)
- 1952–1953: William Granaas (NKP)
- 1953–1955: Hans Kolle (acting) (Ap)
- 1955–1955: Hjalmar Bellika (acting) (Ap)
- 1956–1959: Jan K. Lund (Ap)
- 1960–1963: Karl Kivijervi (Ap)
- 1964–1968: Torleif Johansen
- 1972–1978: Harald Mjøen (Ap)
- 1979–1983: Jakob Aarøen (V)
- 1983–1988: Odd Arne Rasmussen (Ap)
- 1988–1991: Lars Bakken (Ap)
- 1991–2001: Eva M. Nielsen (Ap)
- 2001–2011: Geir Ove Bakken (Ap)
- 2011–2015: Laila Davidsen (H)
- 2015–2025: Monica Nielsen (Ap)
- 2025-present: Jan Martin Rishaug (Sp)

== Geography ==
Alta Municipality covers 3,845 square kilometres (1,485 square miles), in western Finnmark, mostly situated along the Altafjord, including large tracts of woodlands, as well as parts of the Finnmarksvidda plateau. On its way from the plateau down to the fjord, the river Altaelva has carved out the Sautso canyon, one of the largest canyons in Europe. The large Altafjorden has several notable bays and fjord arms that branch off from it including Langfjorden, Jiepmaluokta, Kåfjorden, and Lille Kufjorden.

Alta is based on the mainland of Norway, but it also includes parts of the islands of Stjernøya and Seiland. Seiland is the home of Seiland National Park where the Seilandsjøkelen glacier and the mountain Seilandstuva are located. The highest point in the municipality is the 1,149-metre (3,770 ft) tall mountain Store Haldi.

Several of the notable lakes in Alta include Iešjávri, Juovvajávri, Kovvatnet, and Stuorajávri.

In 2020, a landslide destroyed 8 houses.

=== Climate ===
Alta has a sheltered boreal climate (Köppen Dfc, Trewartha Eolo) with long, cold and dark winters, but less cold than typical for 70 degrees north. Lowland areas in Alta are mostly sheltered from the winter storms, which can be strong on the coast north of Alta. Summers are generally cool, with temperatures fairly similar to coastal southwestern Norway. However, winds from south/southeast can sometimes bring the temperatures closer to 30°C. The Alta valley does not have permafrost but is dominated by closed-canopy forest of birch and pine. Precipitation is low, with a yearly average precipitation of only 438 millimetres (17.2 in). The frequent clear skies are the reason why Alta early was chosen as an excellent location for studying the aurora borealis. The "midnight sun" is above the horizon from 18 May to 27 July, lasting a bit longer than the polar night from 26 November to 16 January. The average date for the last overnight freeze (low below 0 °C (32.0 °F)) in spring is 14 May and average date for first freeze in autumn is 25 September at Alta Airport (1981–2010 average) giving a frost-free season of 133 days.

Climate data for Alta Airport, Finnmark (1991–2020)
Month	Jan	Feb	Mar	Apr	May	Jun	Jul	Aug	Sep	Oct	Nov	Dec	Year
Mean daily maximum °C (°F)	−3.3 (26.1)	−3.6 (25.5)	−0.4 (31.3)	3.7 (38.7)	8.8 (47.8)	13.7 (56.7)	17.6 (63.7)	16 (61)	11.5 (52.7)	4.9 (40.8)	0.3 (32.5)	−1.5 (29.3)	5.7 (42.3)
Daily mean °C (°F)	−6.8 (19.8)	−7 (19)	−4 (25)	0.4 (32.7)	5.5 (41.9)	10.1 (50.2)	13.7 (56.7)	12.3 (54.1)	8.2 (46.8)	2.3 (36.1)	−2.8 (27.0)	−4.9 (23.2)	2.3 (36.1)
Mean daily minimum °C (°F)	−10.2 (13.6)	−10.3 (13.5)	−7.4 (18.7)	−2.8 (27.0)	2.5 (36.5)	7.4 (45.3)	10.9 (51.6)	9.5 (49.1)	5.6 (42.1)	−0.1 (31.8)	−5.5 (22.1)	−8 (18)	−0.7 (30.7)
Average precipitation mm (inches)	39 (1.5)	28.6 (1.13)	33.1 (1.30)	24.2 (0.95)	25.9 (1.02)	38.9 (1.53)	50.3 (1.98)	47.1 (1.85)	37.3 (1.47)	45.1 (1.78)	31.6 (1.24)	37.2 (1.46)	438.3 (17.26)
Source: National Oceanic and Atmospheric Administration

Climate data for Alta Airport, Finnmark (1981–2010, extremes 1874–present)
Month	Jan	Feb	Mar	Apr	May	Jun	Jul	Aug	Sep	Oct	Nov	Dec	Year
Record high °C (°F)	9.9 (49.8)	11.5 (52.7)	10.8 (51.4)	15.6 (60.1)	28 (82)	31.9 (89.4)	33.0 (91.4)	31.8 (89.2)	24.4 (75.9)	17.4 (63.3)	14.7 (58.5)	10.8 (51.4)	33.0 (91.4)
Mean daily maximum °C (°F)	−3.7 (25.3)	−3.6 (25.5)	−0.9 (30.4)	3.3 (37.9)	8.2 (46.8)	13.6 (56.5)	17.3 (63.1)	15.7 (60.3)	10.8 (51.4)	4.8 (40.6)	−0.4 (31.3)	−2.6 (27.3)	5.2 (41.4)
Daily mean °C (°F)	−7.3 (18.9)	−7.1 (19.2)	−4.4 (24.1)	0.0 (32.0)	5.1 (41.2)	10.4 (50.7)	14.0 (57.2)	12.5 (54.5)	7.9 (46.2)	2.3 (36.1)	−3.4 (25.9)	−6.0 (21.2)	2.1 (35.8)
Mean daily minimum °C (°F)	−10.9 (12.4)	−10.6 (12.9)	−7.8 (18.0)	−3.2 (26.2)	2.1 (35.8)	7.2 (45.0)	10.7 (51.3)	9.2 (48.6)	4.9 (40.8)	−0.2 (31.6)	−6.4 (20.5)	−9.4 (15.1)	−1.2 (29.8)
Record low °C (°F)	−34.0 (−29.2)	−30.5 (−22.9)	−28.5 (−19.3)	−21.7 (−7.1)	−16.4 (2.5)	−3.8 (25.2)	0.2 (32.4)	−2.1 (28.2)	−8.5 (16.7)	−20.4 (−4.7)	−33.0 (−27.4)	−31.3 (−24.3)	−34.0 (−29.2)
Average precipitation mm (inches)	38.7 (1.52)	28.0 (1.10)	22.7 (0.89)	22.0 (0.87)	24.2 (0.95)	32.1 (1.26)	49.7 (1.96)	43.7 (1.72)	36.1 (1.42)	42.4 (1.67)	33.0 (1.30)	41.9 (1.65)	413.9 (16.30)
Average precipitation days	9.6	7.7	6.5	6.4	5.8	6.3	8.3	8.0	8.5	9.6	8.4	10.1	95.2

== Transportation ==
Alta is a transportation center in Finnmark. Alta Airport served 334,132 passengers in 2009. There are direct flights to Oslo, Tromsø, Vadsø, Kirkenes, Båtsfjord and Mehamn. The town of Alta also has port facilities in the town center, and European route E6 passes through Alta. The distance to southern Scandinavia is considerably shorter over European route E45 and northern Finland.

== Economy ==
Main activities in Alta include trading, small industry, education, and public service. The town is also famous for its slate industry. Finnmark University College (Norwegian: Høgskolen i Finnmark) is situated in Alta, and there is also a research institution (Norut NIBR Finnmark). The town has the northernmost ice hotel in Europe. Alta is also a popular destination for northern lights viewing and winter tourism, attracting visitors from across Europe and beyond.

== Sports ==
Alta is home to the football club Alta IF. Cross-country skiing is very popular. Alta also has clubs for handball, track and field, alpine skiing, ice skating, taekwondo, and judo.

The bicycle race Finnmark Offroad, with 700- and 300-kilometer long courses, starts and ends in Alta (as of 2014).

Alta is the starting point for the Finnmarksløpet, a 500- and 1000- kilometer sled dog race—The longest sled dog race in Europe.

== Notable people ==
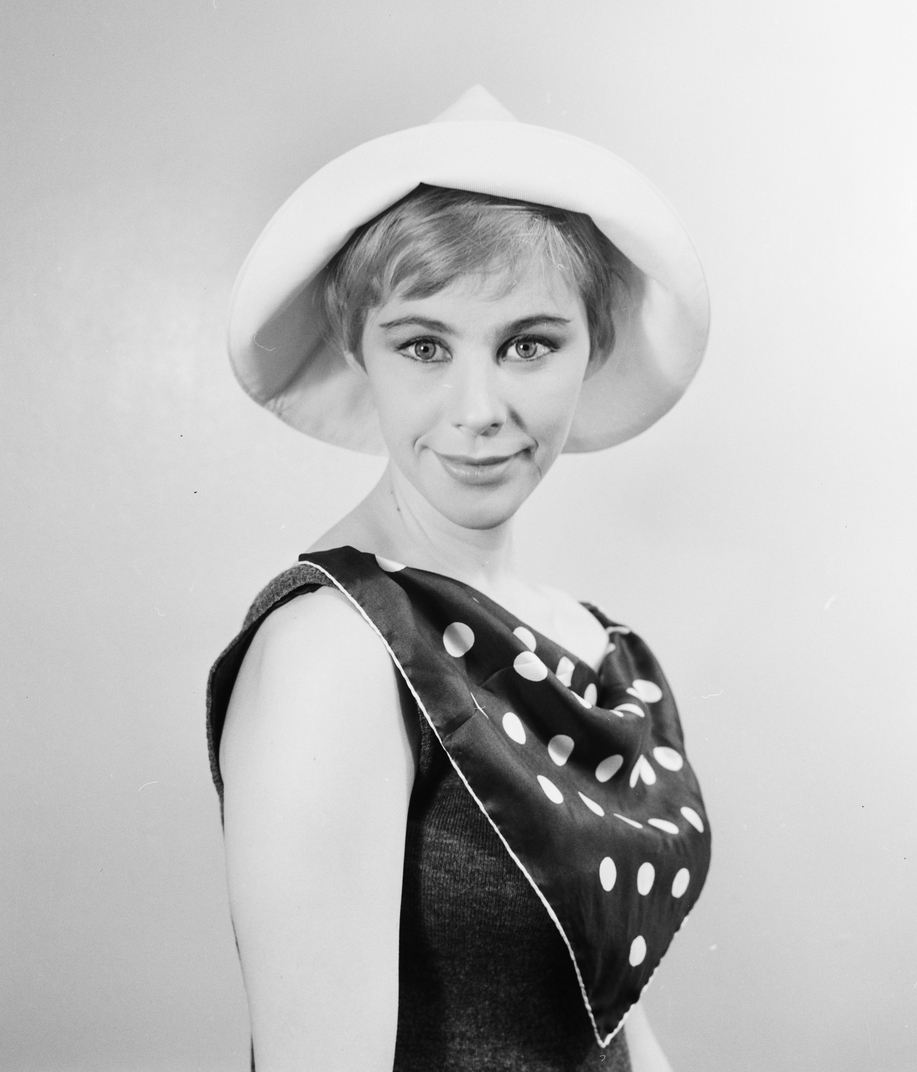
Henny Moan, 1958

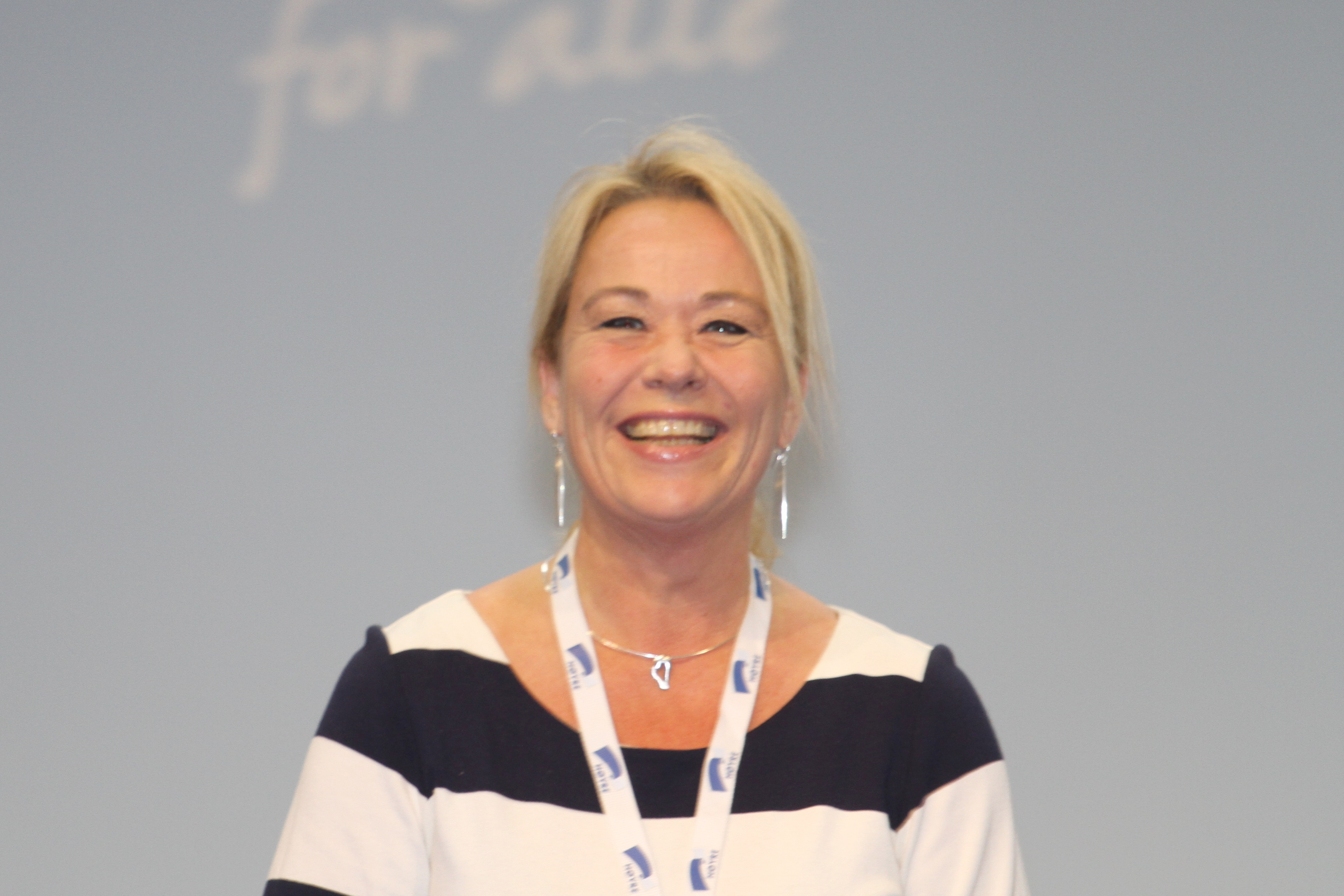
Laila Davidsen, 2017

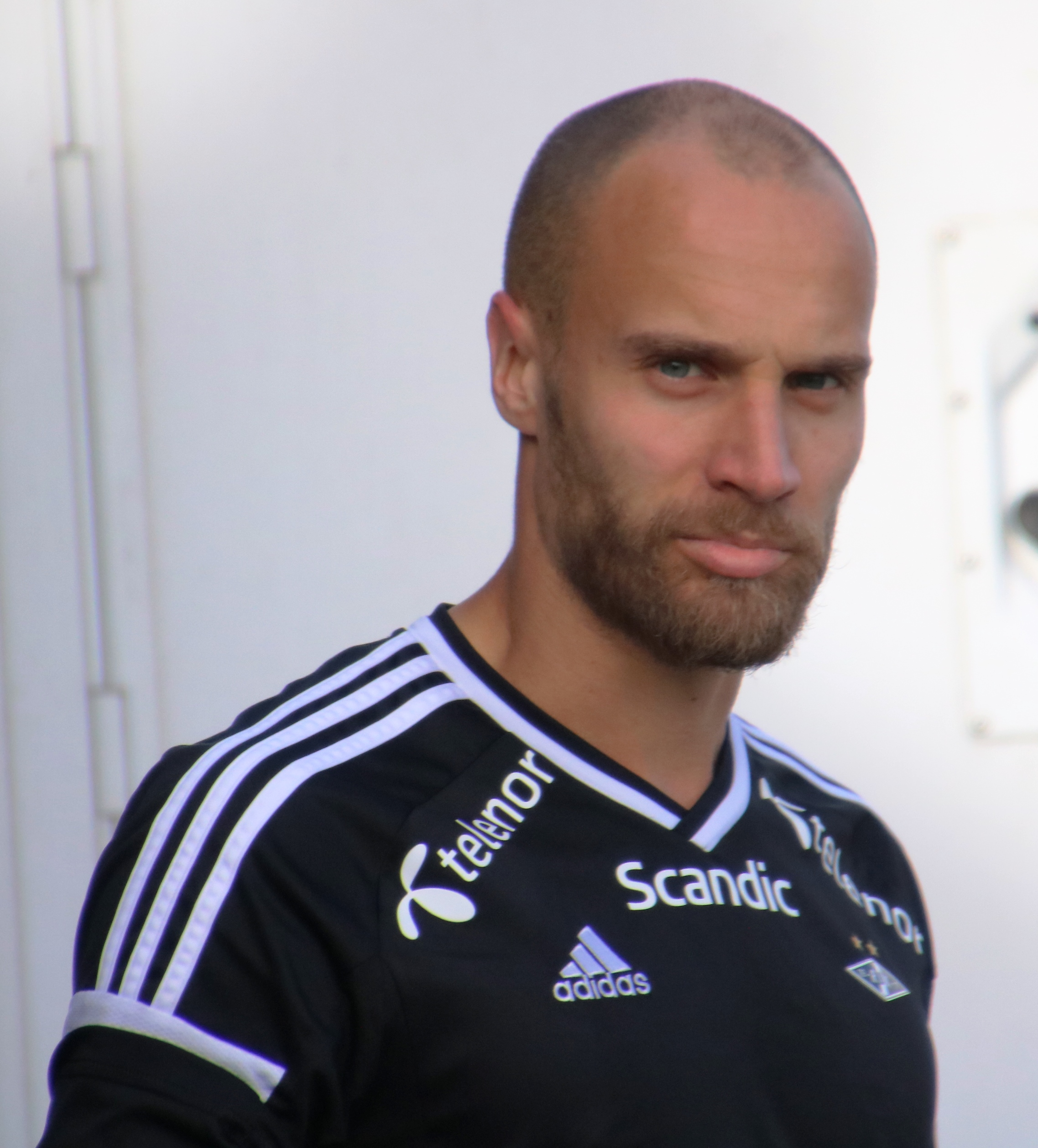
Tore Reginiussen, 2017

- Henry Woodfall Crowe (1832 in Kåfjord–1865), a British-Norwegian interpreter, translator, and author
- Karl Akre (1840 in Alta – 1912), an educator and politician
- Gustav Lund (1862 in Talvik – 1912), a Sámi travelling preacher known as the sled preacher
- Egil Rasmussen (1903 in Bossekop – 1964), an author, literature critic, and pianist
- Kirsten Osen (born 1928 in Alta), an anatomist, otologist, and academic
- Johan Kjelsberg (1931 in Alta – 2012), a stage actor
- Henny Moan (born 1936 in Talvik – 2024), a stage and cinema actress
- Einar M. Bull (born 1942 in Alta), a diplomat
- Tove Bull (born 1945 in Alta), a linguist and academic
- Mikkel Gaup (born 1968 in Alta), a Sámi-Norwegian film and stage actor
- Laila Davidsen (born 1974 in Alta), a politician and mayor of Alta from 2011 to 2015
- Inger Elin Utsi (born 1975), a Norwegian-Sami politician and actor who lives in Alta
- Tommy Wirkola (born 1979 in Alta), a Norwegian film director, producer, and screenwriter of Finnish heritage

=== Sport ===
- Bjørn Wirkola (born 1943 in Alta), a former ski jumper
- Ove Wisløff (born 1954 in Alta), a former breaststroke swimmer who competed at the 1976 Summer Olympics
- Jarle Pedersen (born 1955 in Kåfjord), a retired speed skater and current coach of the Norwegian speed skating team
- Morten Giæver (born 1982 in Alta), a football midfielder with over 350 club caps
- Trond Fredrik Ludvigsen (born 1982 in Alta), a footballer with nearly 200 club caps
- Tore Reginiussen (born 1986 in Alta), a footballer with over 350 club caps
- Mads Reginiussen (born 1988 in Alta), a footballer with over 300 club caps
- Finn Hågen Krogh (born 1990 in Alta), a cross-country skier
- Anna Odine Strøm (born 1998 in Alta), a ski jumper

== Twin towns – sister cities ==
Alta is twinned with:

- Apatity, Russia
- Boden, Sweden
- Oulu, Finland (1948)

== See also ==
- Alta Museum
