= Laila Davidsen =

Norwegian politician (born 1974)

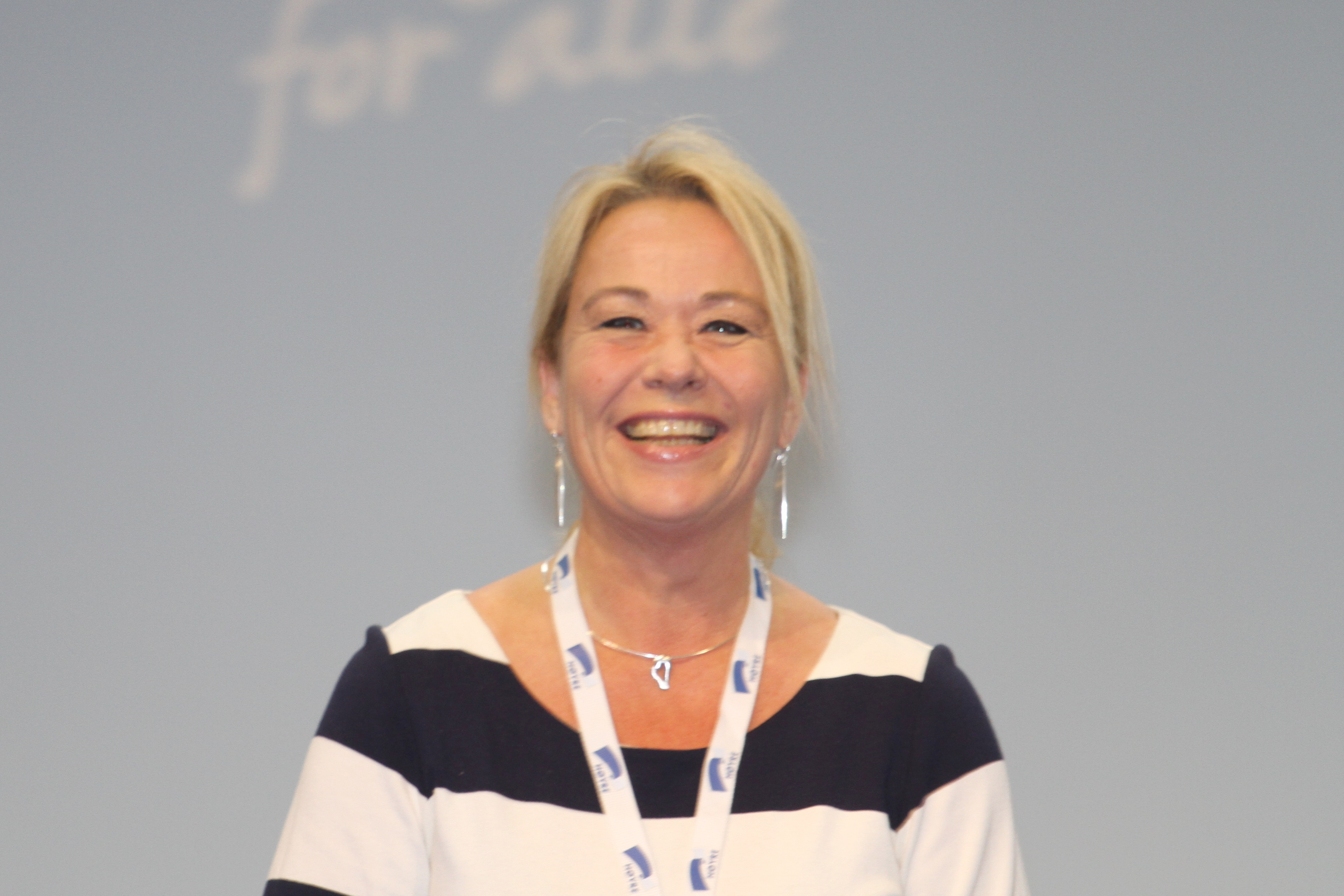
Laila Davidsen

Laila Davidsen (born 28 January 1974) is a Norwegian politician for the Progress and Conservative parties.

She served as a deputy representative to the Parliament of Norway from Finnmark during the terms 2009–2013 and 2013–2017. In December 2016 she moved up to full representative, covering for Frank Bakke-Jensen who was named to Solberg's Cabinet. She is a member of the Standing Committee on Business and Industry.

Locally she elected to the municipal council of Alta Municipality in 2007. In 2010 she changed party from Progress to Conservative. From 2011 to 2015 she served as the mayor of Alta Municipality, and also a member of Finnmark county council.
