= Alta Hydroelectric Power Station =

Virdnejávr Dam
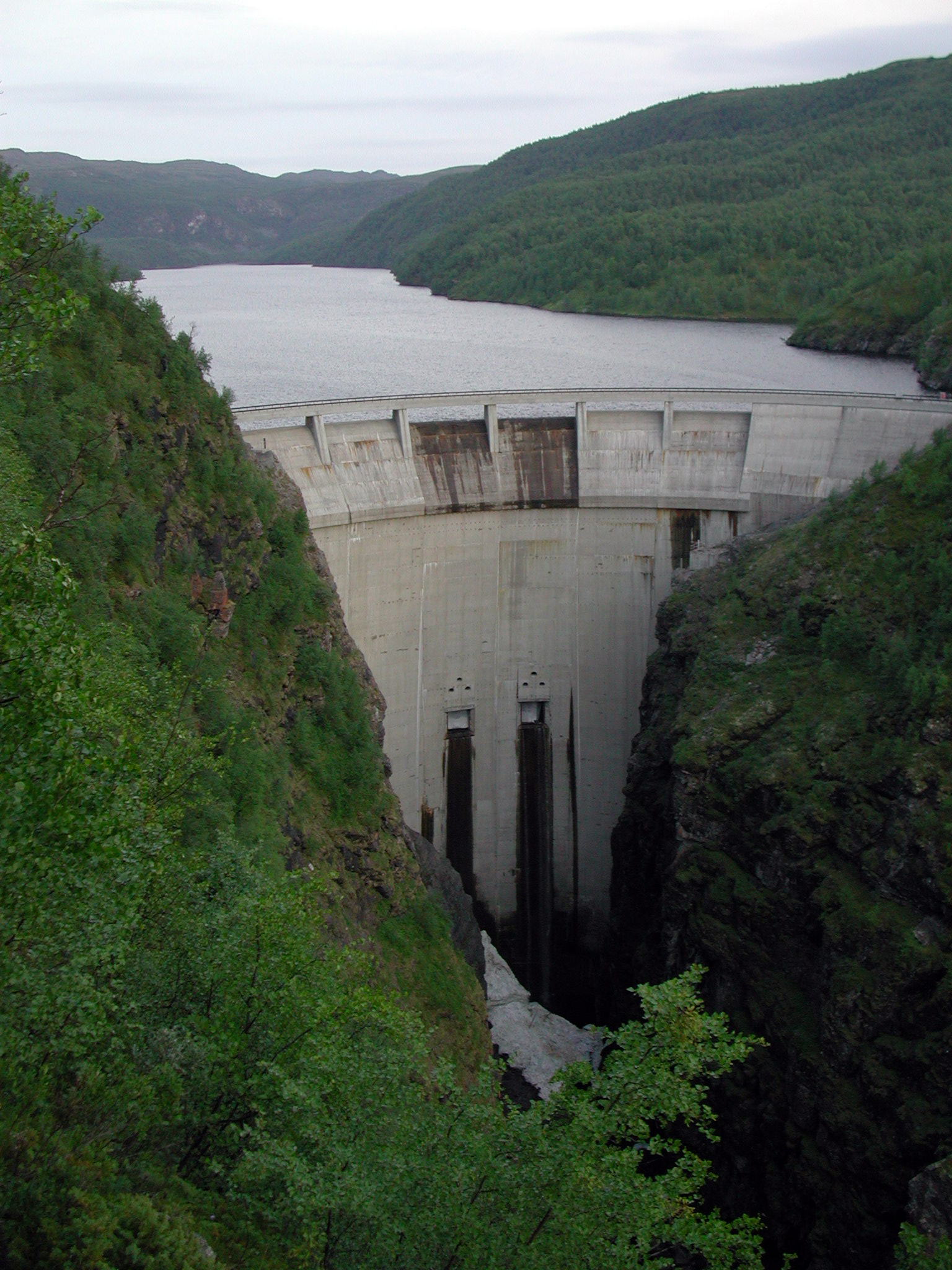

- Location in Finnmark county
- Interactive map of Virdnejávr Dam
- Official name: Alta kraftverk
- Country: Norway
- Location: Alta Municipality, Finnmark
- Coordinates: 69°42′17.77″N 23°49′08.03″E
- Status: Operational
- Opening date: 1987; 39 years ago
- Owner: Statkraft

Dam and spillways
- Type of dam: Arch
- Impounds: Alta-Kautokeino River
- Height: 145 m (476 ft)

Power Station
- Type: Conventional
- Turbines: 2
- Installed capacity: 150 megawatts (200,000 hp) (max. planned)

Alta power station (Norwegian: Alta kraftverk) is a hydroelectric power station located on the Alta-Kautokeino River in Finnmark county, Norway. The power station is located in Alta Municipality, just north of the border with Kautokeino Municipality. It is operated by Statkraft, a Norwegian state-owned electric company, and it opened in 1987.

The station is located 40 kilometres (25 mi) from the mouth of the Alta River, and receives most of its water from the great Finnmarksvidda plateau. Below the power station, the river has salmon, and is a good fishing river. The station consists of two generators, at 100 megawatts (130,000 hp) and 50 MW (67,000 hp), respectively. The station utilises a 185 metres (607 ft) fall from the dam at the end of the 18 km (11 mi) long reservoir Virdnejávri. From the 145 m (476 ft) tall Virdnejávr Dam to the end of the power station, the river is dry for about 2 km (1.2 mi). It is the tallest dam in the country.

== Controversy ==
The background for the controversy was a published plan by the Norwegian Water Resources and Energy Directorate (NVE) that called for the construction of a dam and hydroelectric power plant that would create an artificial lake and inundate the Sámi village of Máze. After the initial plan met political resistance, a less ambitious project was proposed that would cause less displacement of Sámi residents and less disruption for reindeer migration and wild salmon fishing for which the river is widely regarded as the best Atlantic Salmon river in the world.

In 1978, the popular movement against development of the Alta-Kautokeino waterway (Folkeaksjonen mot utbygging av Alta-Kautokeinovassdraget) was founded, creating an organizational platform for first opposing and then resisting construction work. This group and others filed for an injunction in Norwegian courts against the Norwegian government to prevent construction from commencing.

In the fall of 1979, as construction was ready to start, two acts of civil disobedience started. At the construction site itself at Stilla, a number of activists sat down and blocked the machines from starting their work; and at the same time, a number of Sámi activists camped outside the Norwegian parliament, starting a hunger strike.

Documents, which have since been declassified, show the government planned to use military forces to support police authorities' efforts to stop the protests.

The prime minister at the time, Odvar Nordli, pre-empted such an escalation by promising a review of the parliament's decision, but the Norwegian parliament subsequently confirmed its decision to dam the river. More than one thousand protesters chained themselves to the site when the work started again in January 1981. The police responded with large forces, and at one point 10% of all Norwegian police officers were stationed in Alta and quartered in a cruise ship. The protesters were forcibly removed by police.

For the first time since World War II, individuals were arrested and charged with violating laws against rioting. The central organizations for the Sámi people discontinued all cooperation with the Norwegian government. The Supreme Court ruled in favor of the government in early 1982, at which point organized opposition to the power plant ceased, and the power plant was built.

== In popular culture ==
The 2023 Norwegian film Let the River Flow (Ellos Eatnu) by Sámi director Ole Giæver depicts the conflict from the perspective of a young Northern Sámi woman awakening to the complex relations between colonialism, state power, and prejudice against original peoples in 1970s Scandinavia.

The controversy around this project inspired the plot of the 2019 film Frozen II, which is heavily inspired by Sámi culture, including this particular conflict with the national government.

== See also ==
- Nibutani Dam, another dam involved in a conflict between indigenous and national interests
- Vajont Dam, a structurally similar dam
