= Kirsten Osen =

Norwegian anatomist and otologist

- Born: Kirsten Kjelsberg; 20 July 1928 (age 98); Alta, Norway
- Education: University of Oslo
- Occupations: anatomist and otologist
- Employer(s): University of Oslo; University of Tromsø

Kirsten Kjelsberg Osen (born 20 July 1928) is a Norwegian anatomist and otologist.

== Personal life ==
Osen was born in Alta on 20 July 1928, the daughter of a teacher and school principal. Osen graduated as Candidate of Medicine in 1954 and as Doctor Medicinae in 1970.

== Career ==
She was appointed professor of morphology at the University of Tromsø in 1971, and was the first female professor of medicine in Norway. She stayed in Tromsø for five years, and then returned to the University of Oslo, as researcher at the Institute of Anatomy. Her principal field of research has been studies of the cochlear nuclei. She has been active in the Norwegian chapter of the International Physicians for the Prevention of Nuclear War, and the Norwegian Pugwash committee. She is a member of the Norwegian Academy of Science and Letters since 1995. At 97 (in 2025) she is still active as a medical researcher, focusing on animal brains.

== Personal life ==
Osen married flight inspector Knut Osen in 1955.
