= Langfjorden (Alta) =

Fjord in Finnmark, Norway

Langfjorden (Norwegian); Lákkovuonna (Northern Sami)
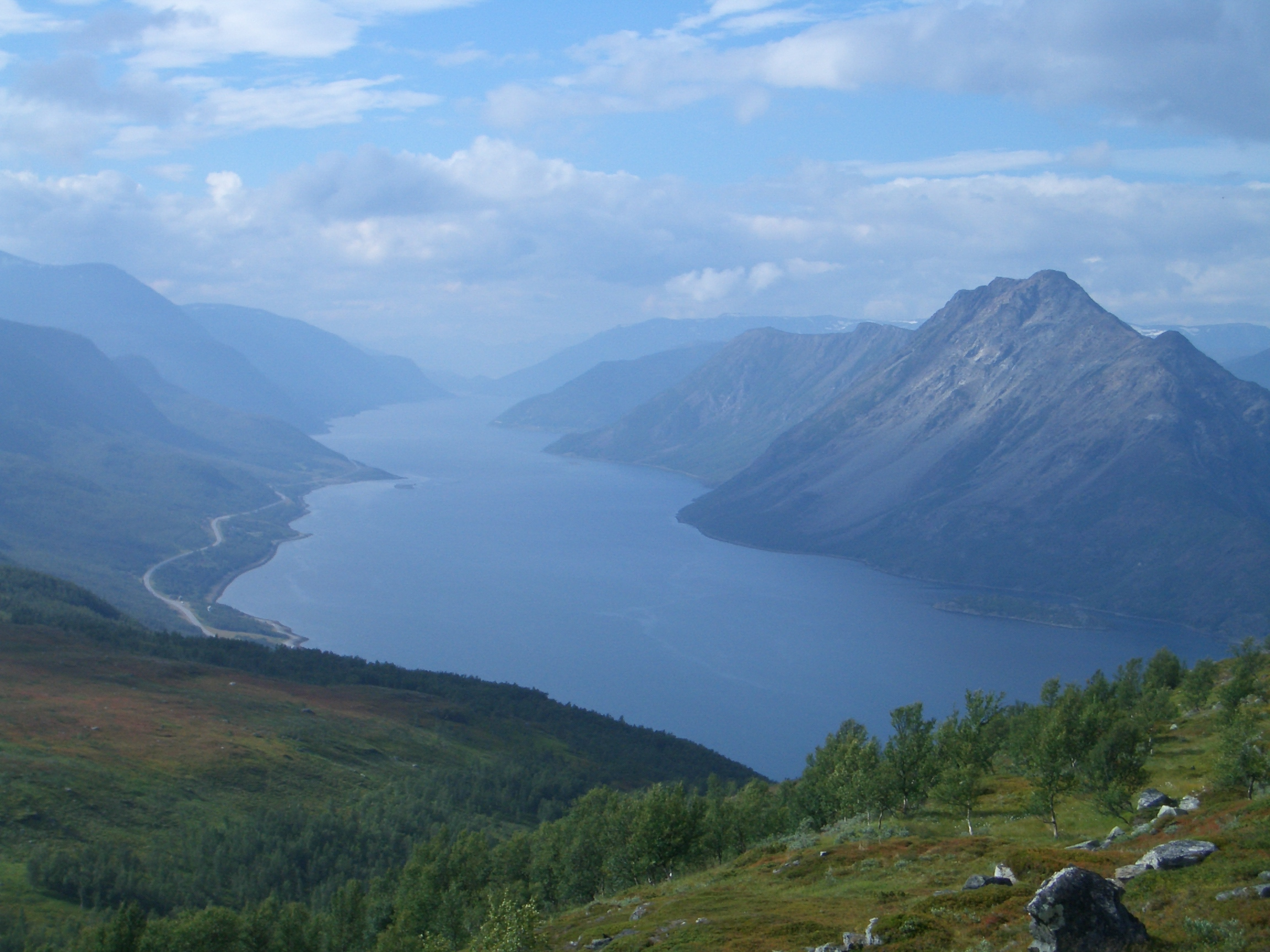
- View of the fjord
- Interactive map of the fjord
- Location: Finnmark county, Norway
- Coordinates: 70°07′11″N 22°52′25″E
- Type: Fjord
- Basin countries: Norway
- Max. length: 30 kilometres (19 mi)

Langfjorden (Norwegian) or Lákkovuonna (Northern Sami) is a fjord in Alta Municipality in Finnmark county, Norway. The 30-kilometre (19 mi) long fjord is a westward branch of the main Altafjorden. At the bottom of the fjord is the village of Langfjordbotn.
