= Jiepmaluokta =

Bay in Alta Municipality, Finnmark, Norway

Hjemmeluftbukta (Norwegian); Jiepmaluokta (Northern Sami)
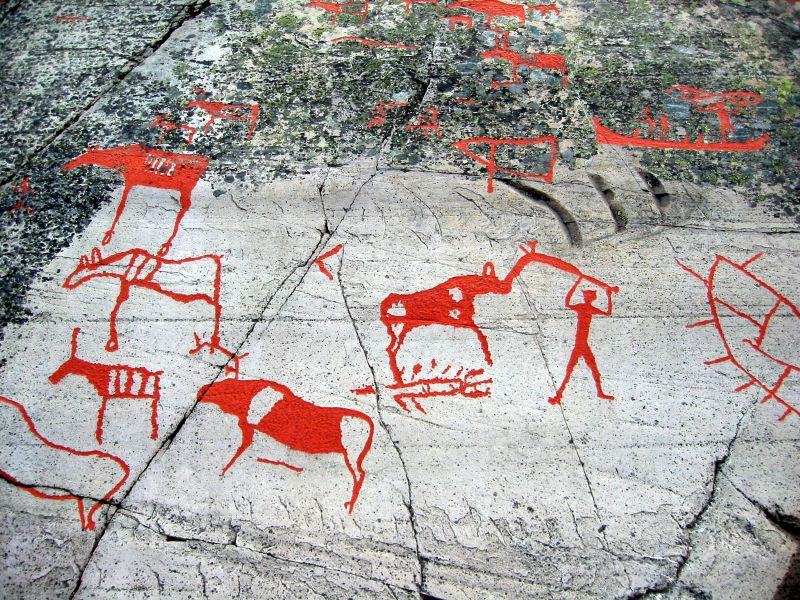
- View of the Rock carvings at Alta near the bay
- Interactive map of: Hjemmeluftbukta (Norwegian); Jiepmaluokta (Northern Sami)
- Location: Finnmark county, Norway
- Coordinates: 69.9518°N 23.1840°E
- Type: Bay
- Primary outflows: Altafjorden
- Basin countries: Norway

Hjemmeluftbukta (Norwegian) or Jiepmaluokta (Northern Sami) is a bay in Alta Municipality, Finnmark, Norway. It is the main site for the rock carvings at Alta with about 3,000 individual carvings (petroglyphs). The bay lies on the southwestern edge of the town of Alta. The bay lies off of the main Altafjorden, at the entrance to the Kåfjorden.

== Etymology ==
Hjemmeluftbukta is an often used example for how the Norwegianization of the indigenous Sámi language names in Northern Norway have often created meaningless names. In the Northern Sámi language the name Jiepmaluokta is "bay of seals" while the Norwegian name Hjemmeluftbukta is an adaption of the Sámi name and is translated to "home air bay".

The ending -luft (air) comes from the accusative and genitive form of the Sámi noun luokta (bay) or "luovtta" which is pronounced "luofta". The Norwegian version's hjemme- (home) may indicate that at an earlier stage the toponym was Jiemmaluokta - the difference being that jiepma is rendered in genitive, making the name mean "seal's bay".

There is also another place in Finnmark County called Jiemmaluokta. In Norwegian, that place is called Saraby and lies in the neighboring Hammerfest Municipality.
