= Altaelva =

River in Finnmark county, Norway

Altaelva Álttáeatnu / Alattionjoki Kautokeinoelva
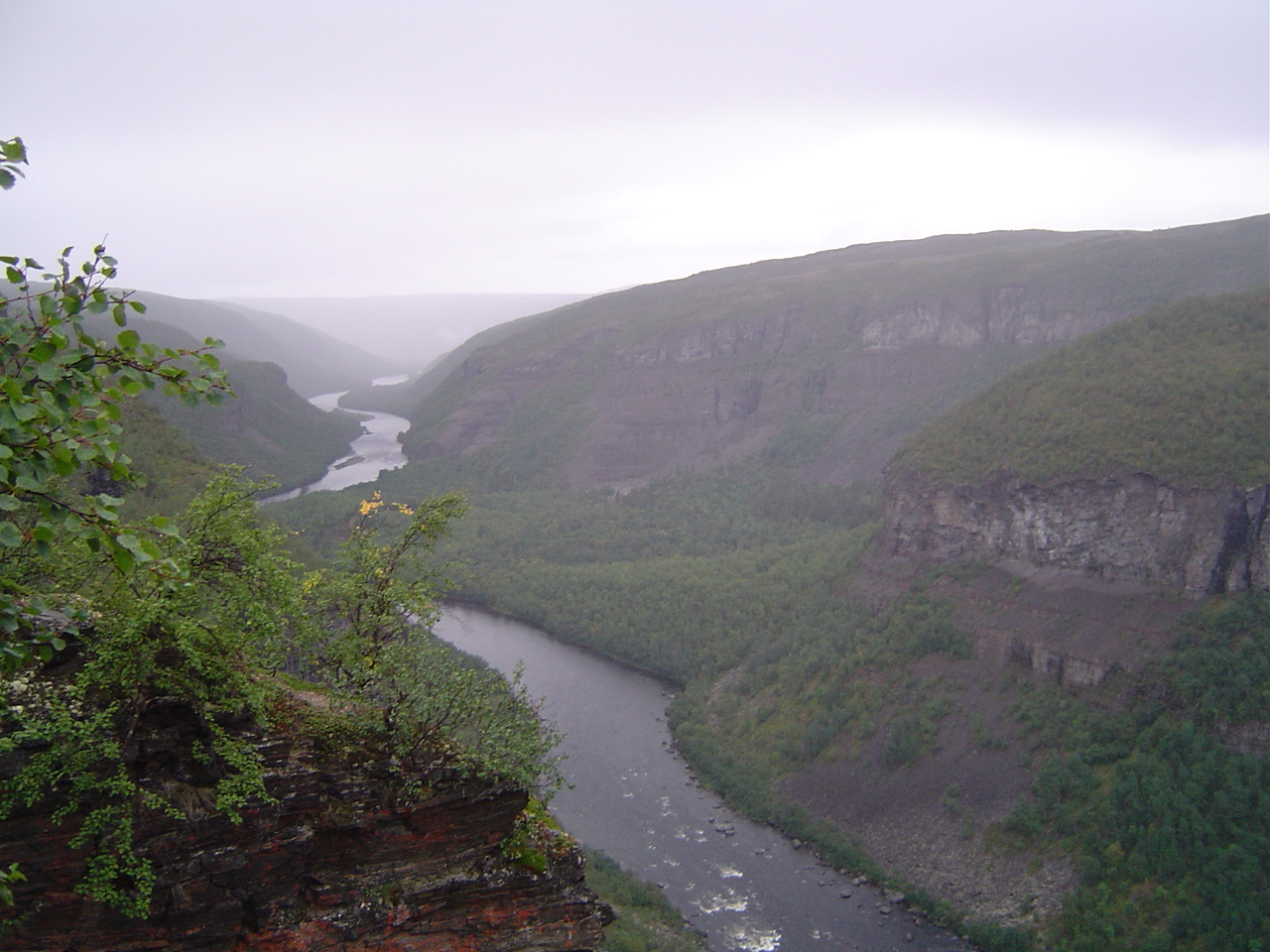
- View of the Sautso canyon

Location
- Country: Norway
- County: Finnmark
- District: Alta, Kautokeino
- City: Alta

Physical characteristics
- Source: South of Reisa National Park near the border with Finland and Finnmark
  - location: Kautokeino, Finnmark, Norway
  - coordinates: 69°04′50″N 22°23′02″E
  - elevation: 483 m (1,585 ft)
- Mouth: Alta
  - location: Alta Municipality, Finnmark, Norway
  - coordinates: 69°58′10″N 23°22′24″E
  - elevation: 0 m (0 ft)
- Length: 240 km (150 mi)
- Basin size: 7,390 km^{2} (2,850 sq mi)
- Discharge
  - location: Alta
  - average: 90 m^{3}/s (3,200 cu ft/s)
  - maximum: 1,200 m^{3}/s (42,000 cu ft/s)

Altaelva (English: Alta River; Northern Sami: Álttáeatnu; Kven: Alattionjoki) is the third-longest river in Finnmark county, Norway. The river begins in the mountains and lakes in Kautokeino Municipality, near the border with Finnmark county and Finland, just south of Reisa National Park. The 240-kilometre (150 mi) long river then runs northward into Alta Municipality where it flows out into the Altafjorden in the town of Alta. The river has carved out Sautso, one of the largest canyons in Europe on its way from the high Finnmarksvidda plateau down to the sea. The villages of Kautokeino and Masi are located along the river, in addition to the town of Alta.

During the 1970s and 1980s, the river was the site of the Alta controversy regarding the construction of a dam and hydroelectric power plant. The Alta power station was eventually built in 1987, creating the lake Virdnejávri on the river.

The river is one of the best salmon rivers in Norway, known for its large-sized salmon. In older days, salmon up to 33 kilograms (73 lb) were recorded, and still fish up to 24 kilograms (53 lb) are caught. In 2011, 1,082 salmon (7 kilograms (15 lb) or heavier) were caught on the river.

== Name ==
The Altaelva literally means the "Alta River" in English. The Northern Sami language version of the name is Álttáeatnu and the Kven language version of the name is Alattionjoki. The part of the river that is upstream (south) of the Alta dam is also called Kautokeinoelva, meaning the "Kautokeino River", since that part of the river lies in Kautokeino. That part of the river is also known as Guovdageaineatnu or Eatnu in the Northern Sami language.

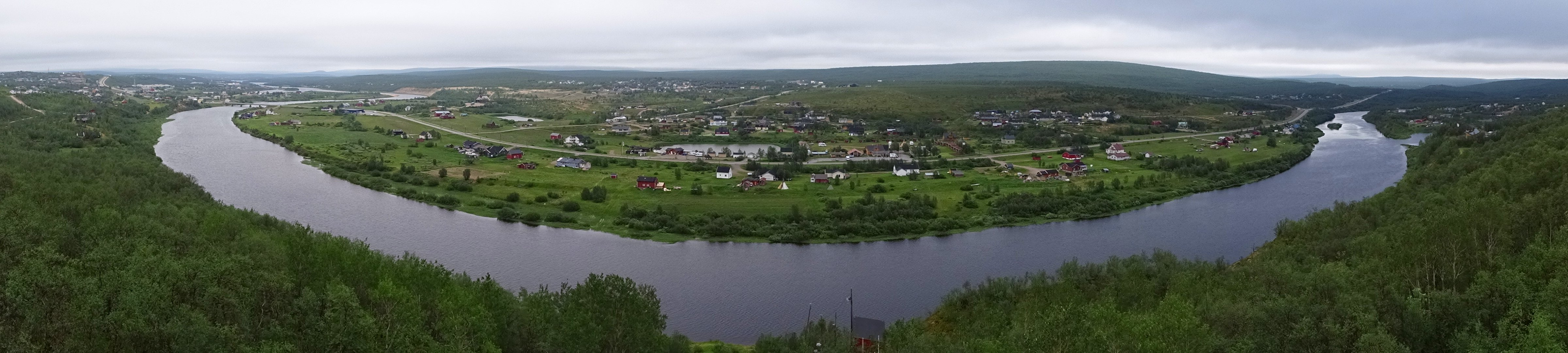
Panorama of Kautokeino river as seen from the ski jump hill south of the town center in Kautokeino
