= Alta Airport =

Airport in Alta, Norway

Alta Airport Alta lufthavn

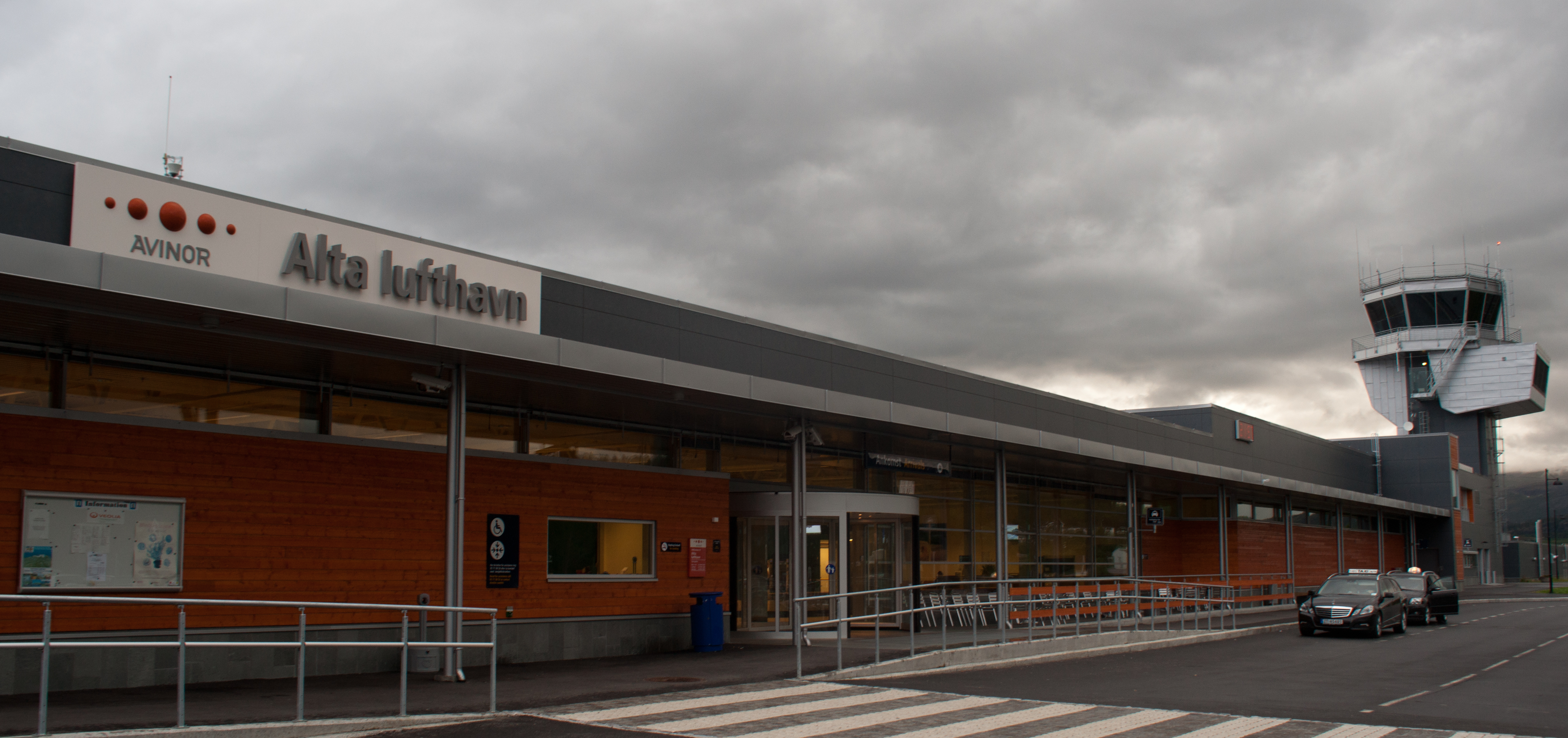
- IATA: ALF; ICAO: ENAT

Summary
- Airport type: Public
- Operator: Avinor
- Serves: Alta, Norway
- Location: Elvebakken, Alta, Finnmark
- Hub for: Widerøe
- Elevation AMSL: 3 m (9.8 ft)
- Coordinates: 69°58′34″N 023°22′18″E
- Website: avinor.no

Map
- Location within Norway

Runways
Direction	Length		Surface
Direction	m	ft	Surface
11/29	2,254	7,395	Asphalt

Statistics (2014)
- Passengers: 368,393
- Air movements: 11,707
- Cargo (tonnes): 330

Alta Airport (Norwegian: Alta lufthavn; Northern Sami: Álttá girdihámman; Kven: Alattion lentohamina; IATA: ALF, ICAO: ENAT) is an international airport in the city of Alta in Alta Municipality in Finnmark county, Norway. The airport is located at Elvebakken, 4 kilometers (2.5 mi) east of the city center. It has a single, 2,253-meter (7,392 ft) runway numbered 11/29, which lies on the southern shore of the Altafjord. Alta Airport is owned and operated by the state-owned Avinor, and served 368,393 passengers in 2014, making it the busiest airport in Finnmark.

Widerøe Ground Handling is the handling agent at the airport, and the airport is served by the airlines Widerøe, Scandinavian Airlines (SAS), Norwegian, Finnair and Discover Airlines. Widerøe operates services to the city of Tromsø and several regional airports in Finnmark, such as Vadsø Airport, Berlevåg Airport, Hammerfest Airport and Kirkenes Airport, feeding to the larger airlines routes.

It serves as a base for two Beechcraft King Airs from Babcock Scandinavian AirAmbulance, and Helitrans AS. There are a limited number of international charter flights, and private jets, especially around salmon fishing season in the Alta river.

The first airport in the area was a military airfield built by the Luftwaffe in 1943, but was damaged beyond repair during World War II. The civilian airport opened on 4 May 1963. At first services were provided by SAS to other primary airports in the north and to Oslo, but in the 1970s, several regional airports opened in Finnmark, with Widerøe flying connecting flights to them. Alta Airport's regional importance increased in 1990, when it became a hub for the newly created SAS Commuter. Norwegian started flying to Alta in 2003 and a new terminal building was opened in 2009.

== History ==
=== Construction ===
The first airport in Alta was built by the Wehrmacht during the German occupation of Norway. Alta was a central part of the German military activity during World War II, resulting in an airstrip being constructed at Elvebakken in 1943. The airport was damaged beyond repair under Operation Nordlicht—the German withdrawal from Finnmark in 1944. During 1945 the Royal Norwegian Air Force operated a seaplane route along the coast of Northern Norway, which included a stop at Alta. However, the route was not resumed the following summer. The municipality started lobbying the air force and the civilian aviation authorities to establish an airline route to Alta. Specifically, they argued that both the water aerodrome at Bukta and an airfield at Altagård/Elvebakken be included in the national plans for future airports. The area at Altagårdsletta was freed up by the military in 1946 and zoned for use as an airport.

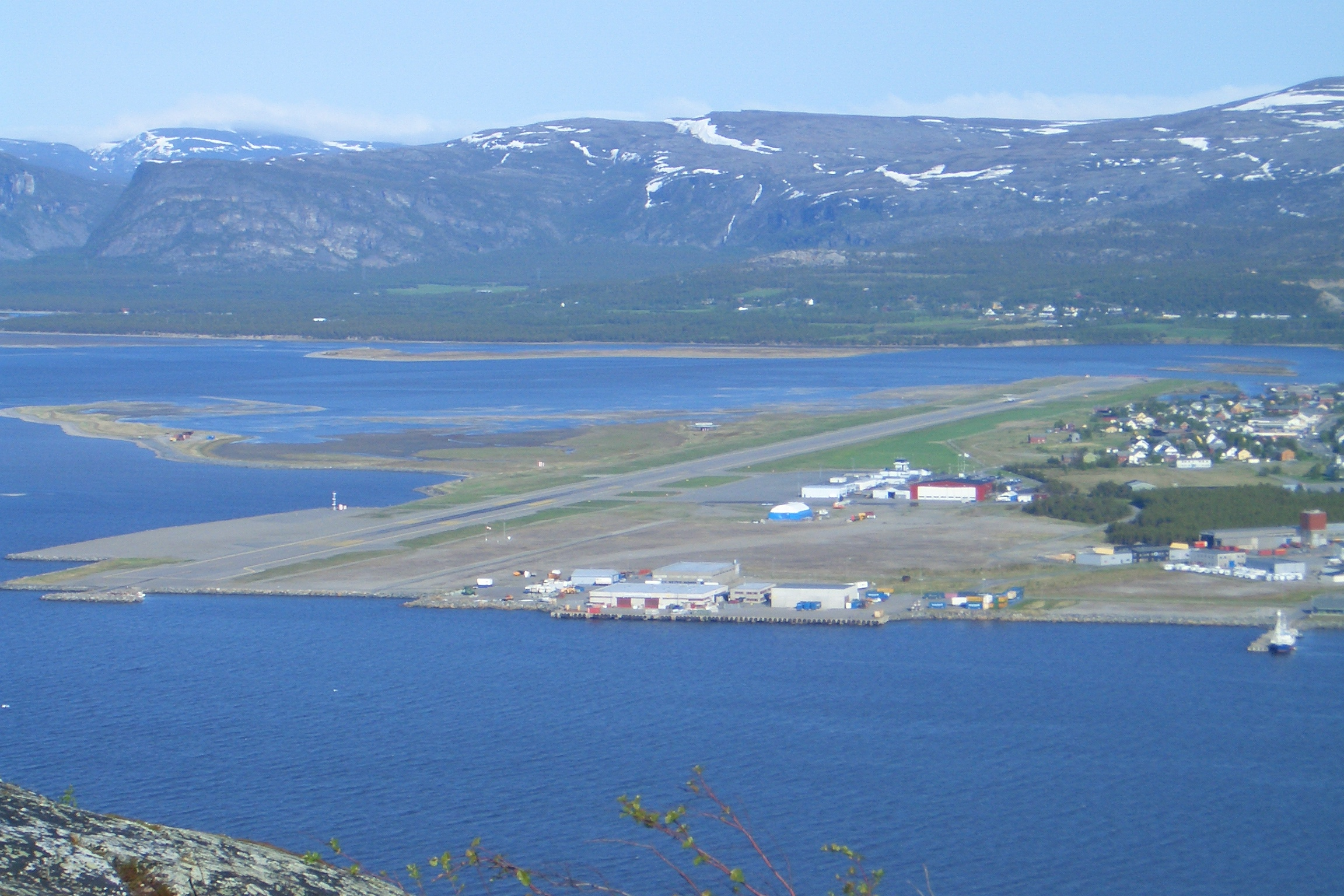
Aerial view of the airport from 2005, before the new terminal was built. Bukta in the foreground, the mouth of the Altaelva in the background.

However, no progress was made with the airfield for over a decade. Instead, the water aerodrome at Bukta was upgraded. Initially the passengers were transported to the aircraft with a boat, but after a few years a floating dock was built. Services were only provided during five summer months, from May through September. During the rest of the year, Alta had no airline service; travel time to Oslo was then six days, largely by ship. The route was taken over by Widerøe in 1954, who bought a de Havilland Canada DHC-3 Otter to serve a route from Tromsø via Alta to Hammerfest, Kirkenes and Vadsø. In Tromsø, the routes connected with a Norwegian Air Lines' seaplane service to Oslo. Bukta had 2,000 annual passengers in 1957, and the summer route was flown daily beginning in 1960.

Local politicians started discussing the airfield plans again in the mid-1950s, and an airport for Alta was included in the national airport plan launched in 1956. The municipality started preparatory work, which included expropriation of the necessary area. At that time the plans called for two runways, 1,000 and 800 meters (3,300 and 2,600 ft) long, respectively. By 1958, the municipality had also built water and sewer pipes to the airport site and had spent 60,000 Norwegian krone on the preparatory work and purchase of land. Central authorities were at the same time looking for the most suited site for an airport for western Finnmark, and were considering Lakselv Airport, Banak in Porsanger Municipality, a by-then-closed military air base.

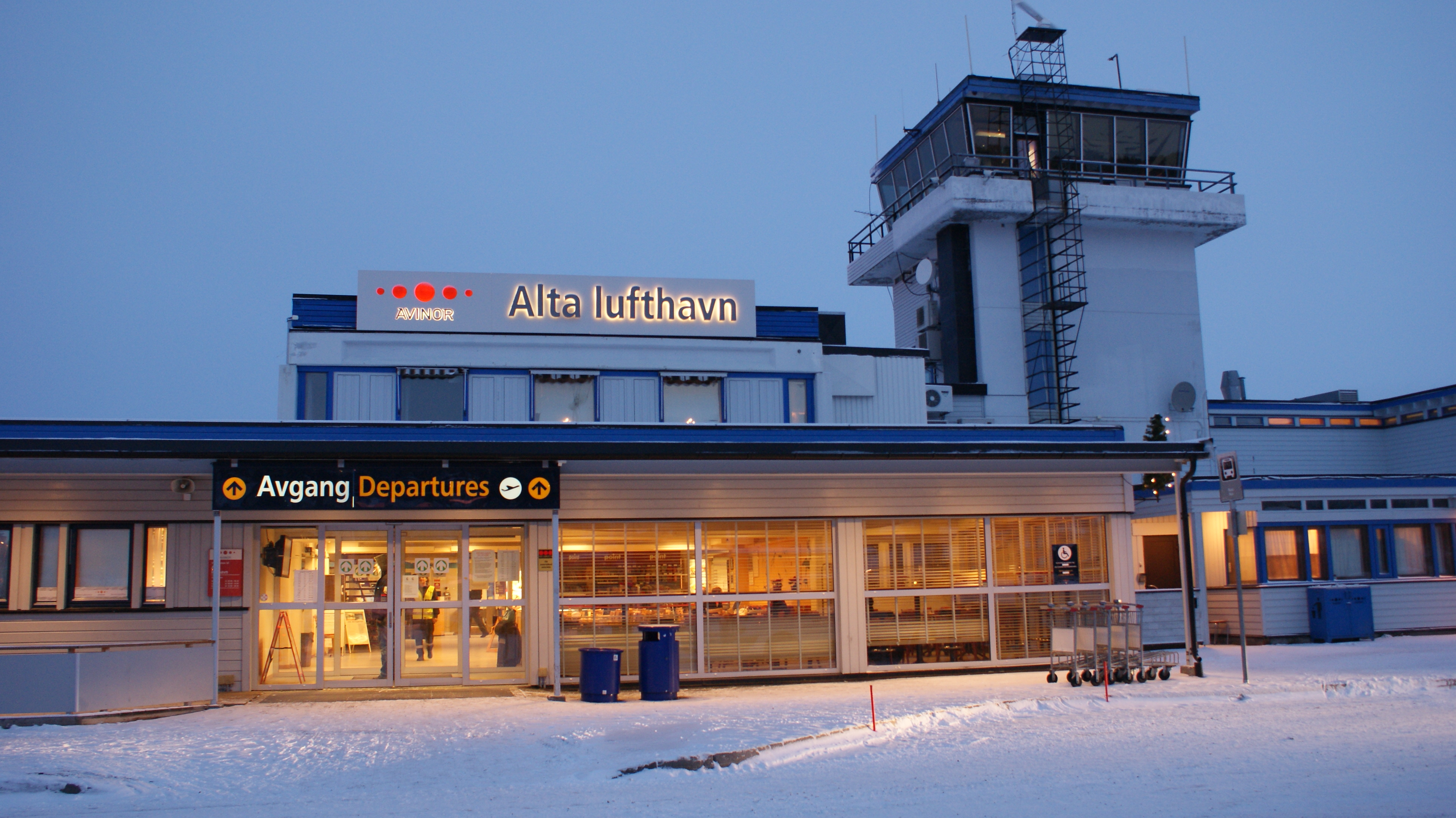
The old terminal building and tower

The location in Elvebakken was somewhat controversial in Alta, especially as the airport would be located so close to the town center, potentially causing noise pollution. An alternative at Sokkelma was considered, but this was discarded because the surrounding mountains prevented good landing conditions. The decision to build Alta Airport was made in 1961, followed by additional expropriation of land. Construction was carried out simultaneously with that of Banak and Kirkenes Airport, Høybuktmoen, which combined would give Finnmark three primary airports.

Construction started in February 1962 and cost NOK 3.2 million. The runway was completed by the fall of that year, but other parts of the construction were delayed. By late April 1963, the airport was lacking fire fighting equipment and ground crew had still not received sufficient training. However, the issues were resolved, allowing the airport to open on schedule on 4 May 1963. Lakselv and Kirkenes Airport also opened the same day, while Tromsø Airport opened the following year. Several important facilities were missing from Alta Airport when it opened; the control tower and the passenger terminal were not completed until 1964, so at first a shed was used as terminal.

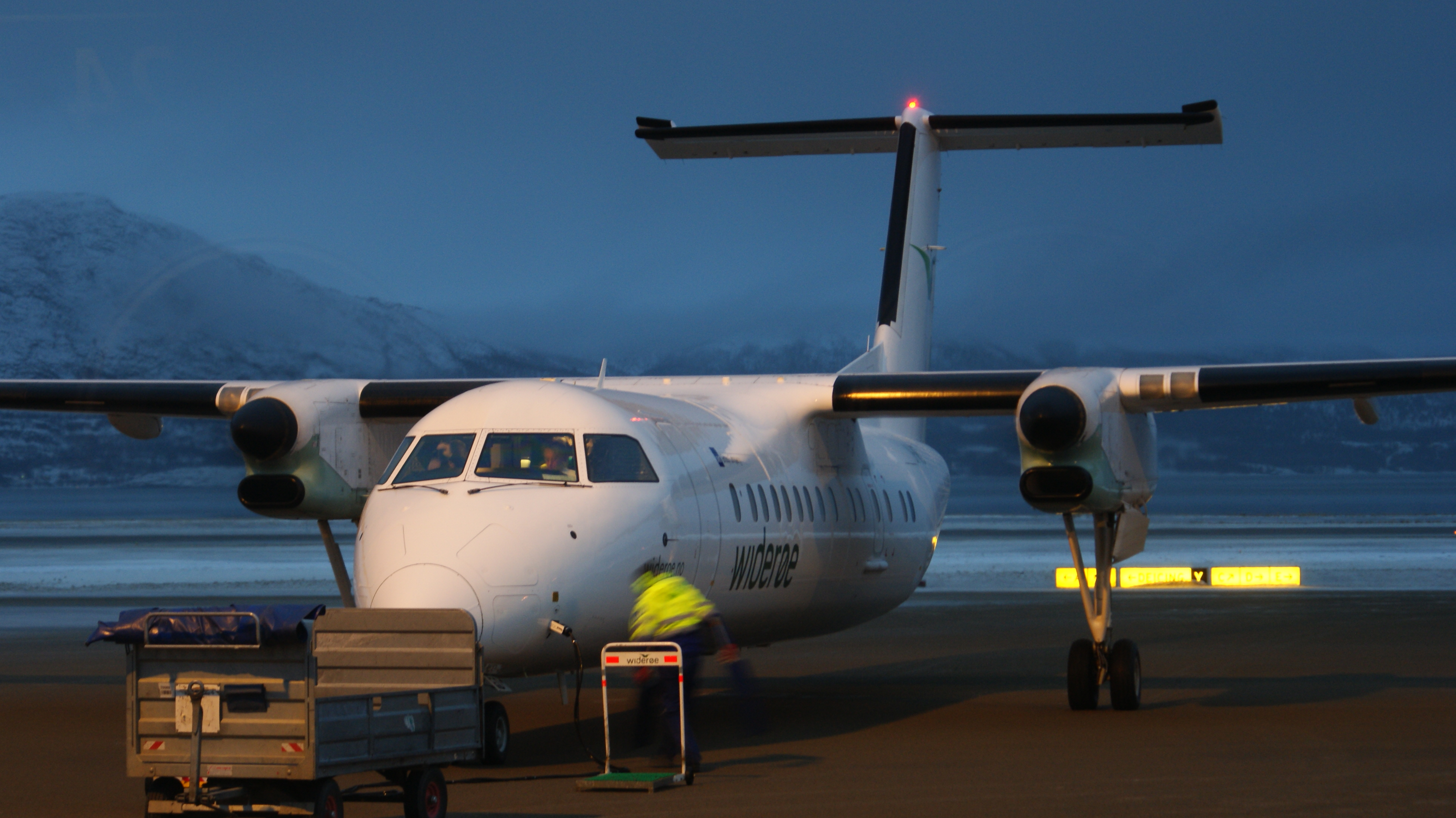
Widerøe Dash-8 311 at noontime during polar night

=== Operational history ===
Services were at first operated by Scandinavian Airlines System (SAS). At the beginning the airline used 56-passenger Convair CV-440 Metropolitan aircraft, which flew flights south to Oslo and westward to Lakselv and Kirkenes—and also to Tromsø starting in 1964. The general route scheme of flying multi-legged flights from Oslo to Finnmark remained until 1990. On 7 April 1969, SAS introduced the 85-passenger Douglas DC-9-21 jetliner on the Alta service; the last Metropolitan flew on 1 April 1970. Five regional airports opened on 1 August 1974, Sørkjosen, Hammerfest, Mehamn, Berlevåg and Vadsø, all which were connected to Alta and other primary airports by Widerøe using de Havilland Canada DHC-6 Twin Otters. Honningsvåg Airport opened on 1 July 1977. SAS' traffic increased throughout the 1970s, resulting in SAS gradually increasing the frequency of its services, and later also using larger DC-9s. The McDonnell Douglas MD-80 was first flown on the Alta route on 11 July 1986.

SAS Commuter was established in 1988 and started operations in Northern Norway in May 1990, making Alta its central hub for Finnmark. This involved a change to the operations so that all DC-9 services from Alta to Oslo were flown non-stop. Conversely, all services to airports in Northern Norway were flown using the smaller Fokker 50. Thus SAS was able to reduce costs by no longer operating local routes with the DC-9/MD-80 and instead increased the number of flights. The change made Alta the only airport in Finnmark with direct services to Oslo. From 1989 to 1990, the number of annual aircraft movements at Alta hiked from 7,711 to 10,035.

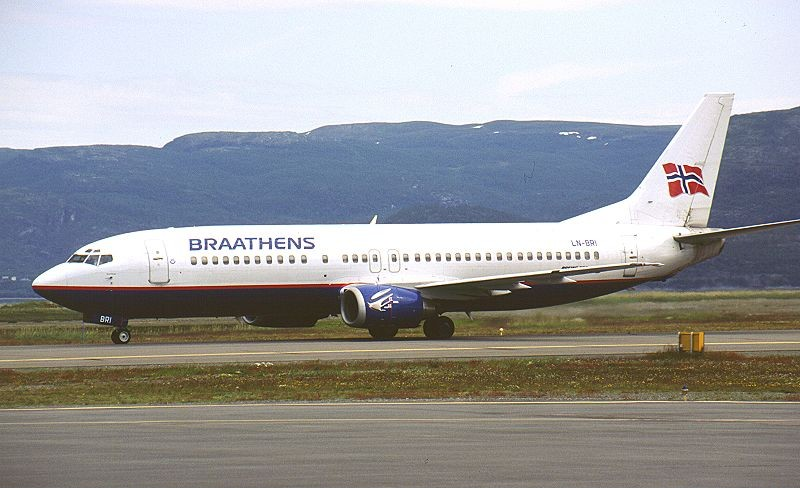
Braathens took over the Oslo route in 2002, here depicted with a Boeing 737-400 that visited in 2000

Activity at Alta Airport peaked in the following years. SAS served Alta with up to ten daily services; at peak hours six aircraft were at the airport simultaneously, including two from Widerøe. From 1992, SAS reintroduced direct services from Kirkenes to Oslo, and aircraft in eastern Finnmark again started feeding into Kirkenes. The hub paradigm was thus gradually abandoned by SAS. Flights at Alta gradually decreased, hitting a low of 4,935 movements (landings and take-offs) in 2000. The North Cape Tunnel opened in 1999, connecting Honningsvåg and Nordkapp to the mainland. This reduced travel time to Alta and people from Nordkapp started using Alta more for long-haul flights at the expense of Honningsvåg Airport.

SAS bought Braathens in 2001, resulting in the latter taking over the service to Oslo starting on 1 April 2002. All SAS Commuter services in Northern Norway were taken over by Widerøe in October 2002. Norwegian Air Shuttle started its services from Oslo to Alta on 19 August 2003, initially with three services daily. SAS and Braathens merged in 2004 to form SAS Braathens; the airline changed its name back to Scandinavian Airlines in 2007.

Plans for expanding the 1,670-square-meter (18,000 sq ft) terminal facilities were first articulated by the Civil Airport Administration in the 1990s. The upgrade was given priority in a 2000 plan, but was shortly after placed on hold in favor of upgrades of Kirkenes Airport and Svalbard Airport, Longyear. By 2005 the Civil Aviation Authority announced that the aircraft parking areas at Alta were too close to the runway and that the airport would lose its certification in 2008 unless it was upgraded. Another concern was the lack of capacity, as the airport could only handle 150 passengers simultaneously at two gates.

Avinor decided in February 2007 to build a new passenger terminal and tower for NOK 300 million. The new terminal was 5,000 square meters (54,000 sq ft) and was located between the old terminal and the port facilities. It included improved facilities for security control and allowed international services. The new terminal was put into use on 23 October 2009 and was officially opened on 25 September.

== Facilities ==
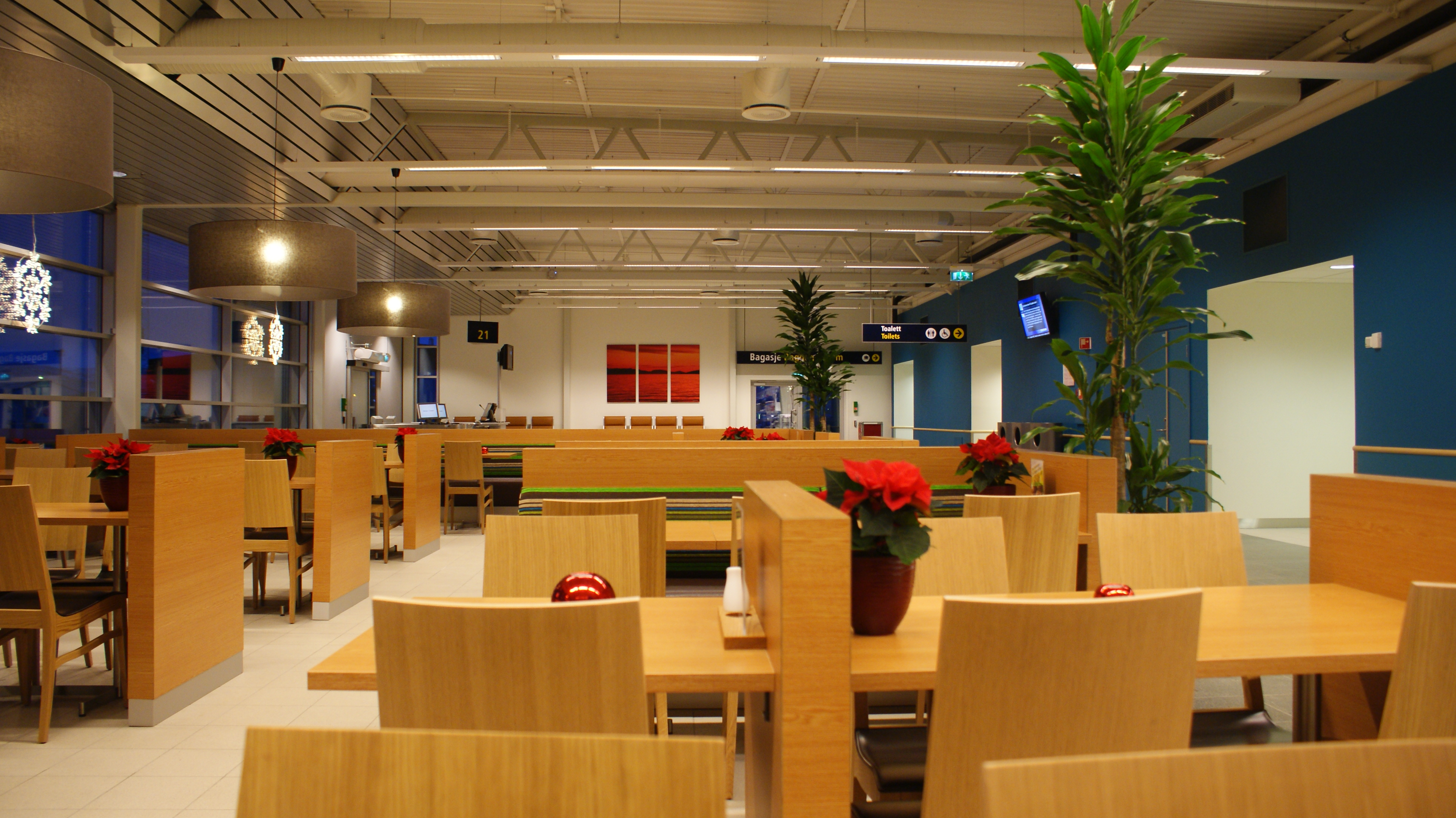
Airside waiting hall

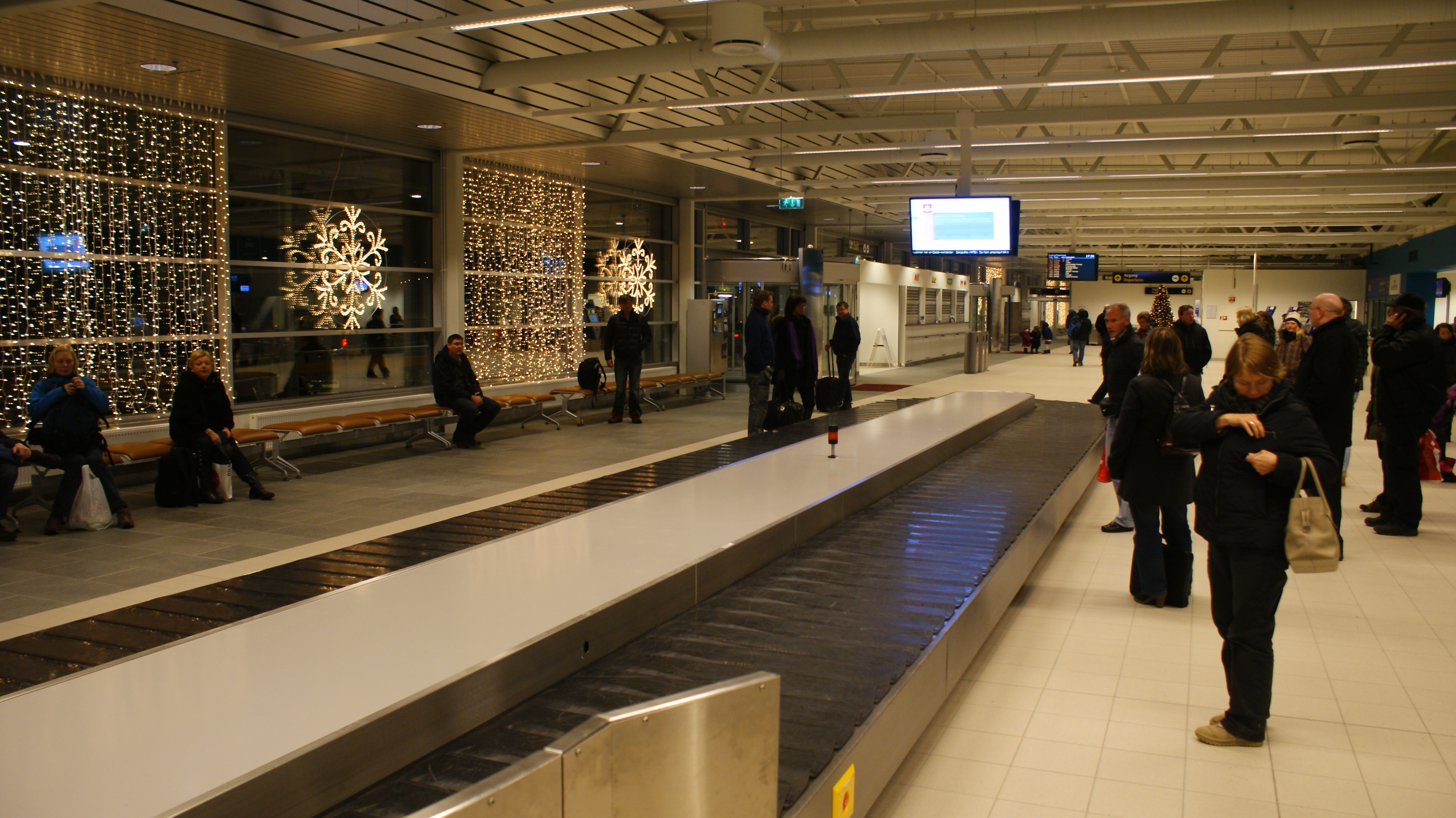
Arrival area with baggage conveyor

The airport is located at Elvebakken and Altagård, on the southern shore of the Altafjord and at the mouth of the river Altaelva, which is about 4 kilometers (2.5 mi) east of Bossekop, in the town of Alta. Operated by the state-owned Avinor, it has a single 2,253-meter (7,392 ft) runway aligned 11–29 (roughly east–west), without a taxiway. One direction is equipped with an instrument landing system category I. The terminal building is 5,000 square meters (54,000 sq ft) and can handle international flights. In 2013, the airport had 368,393 passengers, 11,707 aircraft movements (landings and take-offs) and 330 tonnes of cargo, making it the busiest airport in Finnmark.

Airport bus service is operated by Boreal Transport and takes ten minutes to the town centre. Taxis and car rental are also available at the airport. There are 520 long-term parking spaces at the airport. From Alta to Hammerfest there are both coach and fast ferry services; travel time to Hammerfest is two hours.

== Airlines and destinations ==
Alta Airport is served by four scheduled airlines and two charter airlines, providing services to eleven destinations, including three abroad. Scandinavian Airlines and Norwegian Air Shuttle serve the airport using Boeing 737 aircraft, each providing services to Oslo. Widerøe operates regional services in Finnmark on a public service obligation contract with the Ministry of Transport and Communications. However, there is seven (three direct) daily services to Tromsø. Widerøe operates de Havilland Canada Dash 8 aircraft on their services, using both the 39- and the 50-passenger Dash 8 aircraft to Tromsø, and the 39-passenger Dash 8 aircraft only on services to regional airports in Finnmark.

Alta Airport's catchment area includes Kautokeino Municipality, Loppa Municipality, and Kvænangen Municipality. The catchment area partially includes Hammerfest Municipality (137 kilometers or 85 miles by road). Hammerfest Municipality is served by Hammerfest Airport as their local airport, but the regional airport does not provide direct flights to Oslo and the prices to Tromsø are higher. In 2007, an estimated 81,000 passenger-flights at Alta Airport were generated by people living in Hammerfest and Kvalsund. Also journeys to and from other parts of western Finnmark to Alta Airport are often made via Alta, for example from the area around Honningsvåg Airport, Valan. The pass at Sennalandet is sometimes closed during snow storms. If this happens, the alternative route takes six to seven hours (363 km), so the weather forecast should be checked 7–8 hours before.

Airlines	Destinations
Aegean Airlines	Seasonal charter: Chania
Discover Airlines	Seasonal: Frankfurt
Finnair	Helsinki, Kittilä
Norwegian Air Shuttle	Oslo, Tromsø
Scandinavian Airlines	Oslo, Tromsø
Widerøe	Berlevåg, Hammerfest, Kirkenes, Tromsø, Vadsø

== Statistics ==
Annual passenger traffic
Year	Passengers	% Change
2025	382,321	▲4.8%
2024	364,809	▲5.9%
2023	344,396	▲4.6%
2022	329,203	▲38.0%
2021	238,570	▲22.7%
2020	194,458	▼ -47.9%
2019	373,217	▼ -3.5%
2018	386,662	▲2.1%
2017	378,891	▲0.4%
2016	377,294	▼ -3.9%
2015	392,520	

== Future ==
A proposal by a consultant company, ordered by the Ministry of Transport and Communications in 2011, suggested that starting in 2013 the subsidized routes in Finnmark should follow a coastal route, leaving those to Kirkenes and the county capital of Vadsø as the only subsidized routes remaining at Alta. There are proposals to build a new airport for Hammerfest at Grøtnes, either with a 1,999 or 1,199 meters (6,558 or 3,934 ft) runway. If the former is selected, Hammerfest could serve direct flights to Oslo. This would severely reduce Alta's catchment area as a primary airport and could result in a reduction in Oslo flights. The Norwegian government has decided not to build the Hammerfest-Grøtnes airport, and instead improve the Alta-Hammerfest road which started 2015. Also the roads towards Kautokeino and Tromsø are being improved during the period 2010–2019.
