= Elvebakken Church =

- Elvebakken kirke
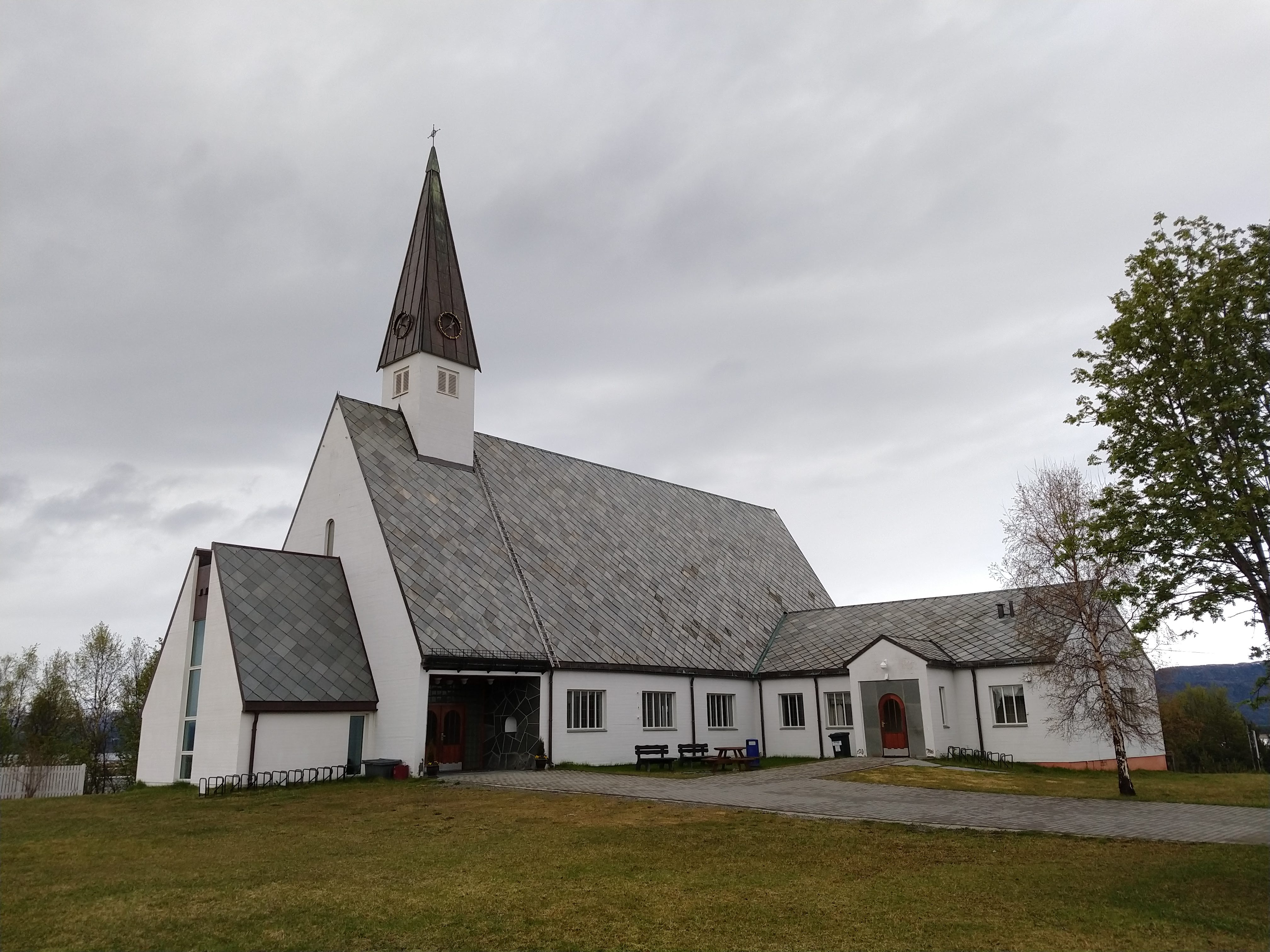
- View of the church
- Elvebakken Church
- 69.971738°N 23.3695399°E
- Location: Alta Municipality, Finnmark
- Country: Norway
- Denomination: Church of Norway
- Churchmanship: Evangelical Lutheran

History
- Status: Parish church
- Founded: 1964
- Consecrated: 23 Aug 1964

Architecture
- Functional status: Active
- Architect: Håkon Soltveit
- Architectural type: Long church
- Completed: 1964 (62 years ago)

Specifications
- Capacity: 210
- Materials: Concrete and wood

Administration
- Diocese: Nord-Hålogaland
- Deanery: Alta prosti
- Parish: Alta
- Norwegian Cultural Heritage Site
- Type: Church
- Status: Not protected
- ID: 84089

Elvebakken Church (Norwegian: Elvebakken kirke) is a parish church of the Church of Norway in Alta Municipality in Finnmark county, Norway. It is located in the Elvebakken area in the town of Alta. It is one of the churches for the Alta parish which is part of the Alta prosti (deanery) in the Diocese of Nord-Hålogaland. The white, wooden church was built in a long church style in 1964 using plans drawn up by the architect Håkon Soltveit. The church seats about 210 people.

== History ==
The people of the Elvebakken area of Alta began pushing for their own local church in 1911. They had been advocating moving the Kåfjord Church to Elvebakken when the copper plant closed. After World War I, people raised money to build a church in Elvebakken, but the banking crisis led to the money collected being lost when the Hammerfest Sparekasse bank failed. Then again in 1937, work to raise money began again. The church was consecrated on 23 August 1964 by the local provost Englund.

== See also ==
- List of churches in Nord-Hålogaland
