= Bossekop =

Village in Alta Municipality, Norway

Bossekop: Bossekop (Norwegian); Bossogohppi (Northern Sami); Possukoppa (Kven)
- Borough
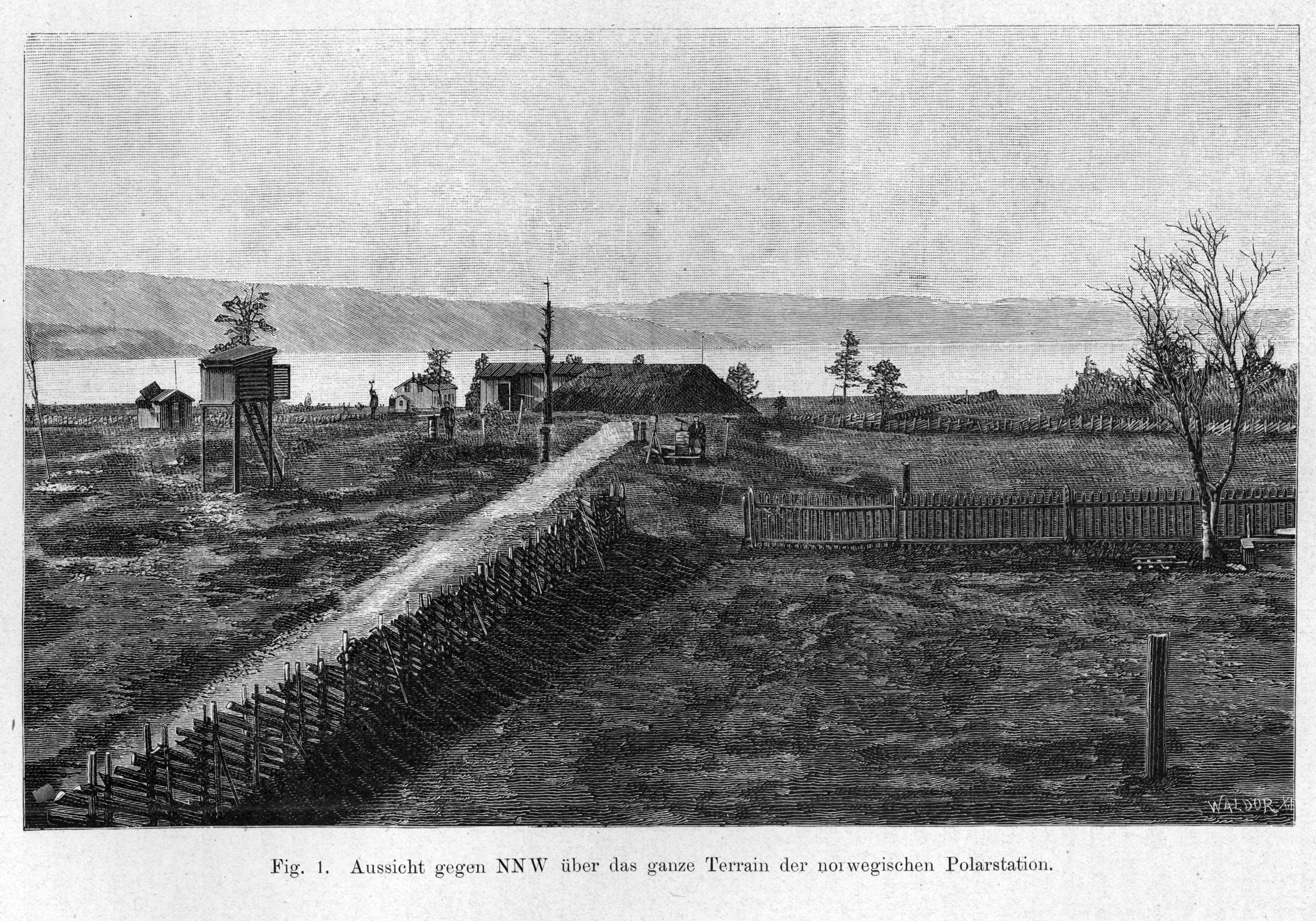
- View of the village (1887-1888)
- Interactive map of Bossekop
- Location within Finnmark Location within Norway
- Coordinates: 69°57′36″N 23°14′06″E
- Country: Norway
- Region: Northern Norway
- County: Finnmark
- District: Vest-Finnmark
- Municipality: Alta Municipality
- Elevation: 26 m (85 ft)
- Time zone: UTC+01:00 (CET)
  - Summer (DST): UTC+02:00 (CEST)

Bossekop (Norwegian), Bossogohppi (Northern Sami), or Possukoppa (Kven) is one of the three boroughs comprising the town of Alta in Alta Municipality, Finnmark county, Norway. It is located on the western end of the town, along the Altafjorden, along the European route E06 highway. Bossekop is an old Sami trading post and marketplace. The name comes from the Sami word meaning Whale Bay. The Rock carvings at Alta lie just west of Bossekop, near the Juovvajávri bay.

Bossekop was destroyed by the Germans during their retreat from occupying Norway in November 1944. The only building left standing in Bossekop was Alta Church. The rest of the village was rebuilt after the war. In 2000, the villages of Bossekop, Alta, and Elvebakken were merged to form the town of Alta. The new Northern Lights Cathedral was built in Bossekop as the new main church for the town.
