= Alta Church =

- Alta kirke
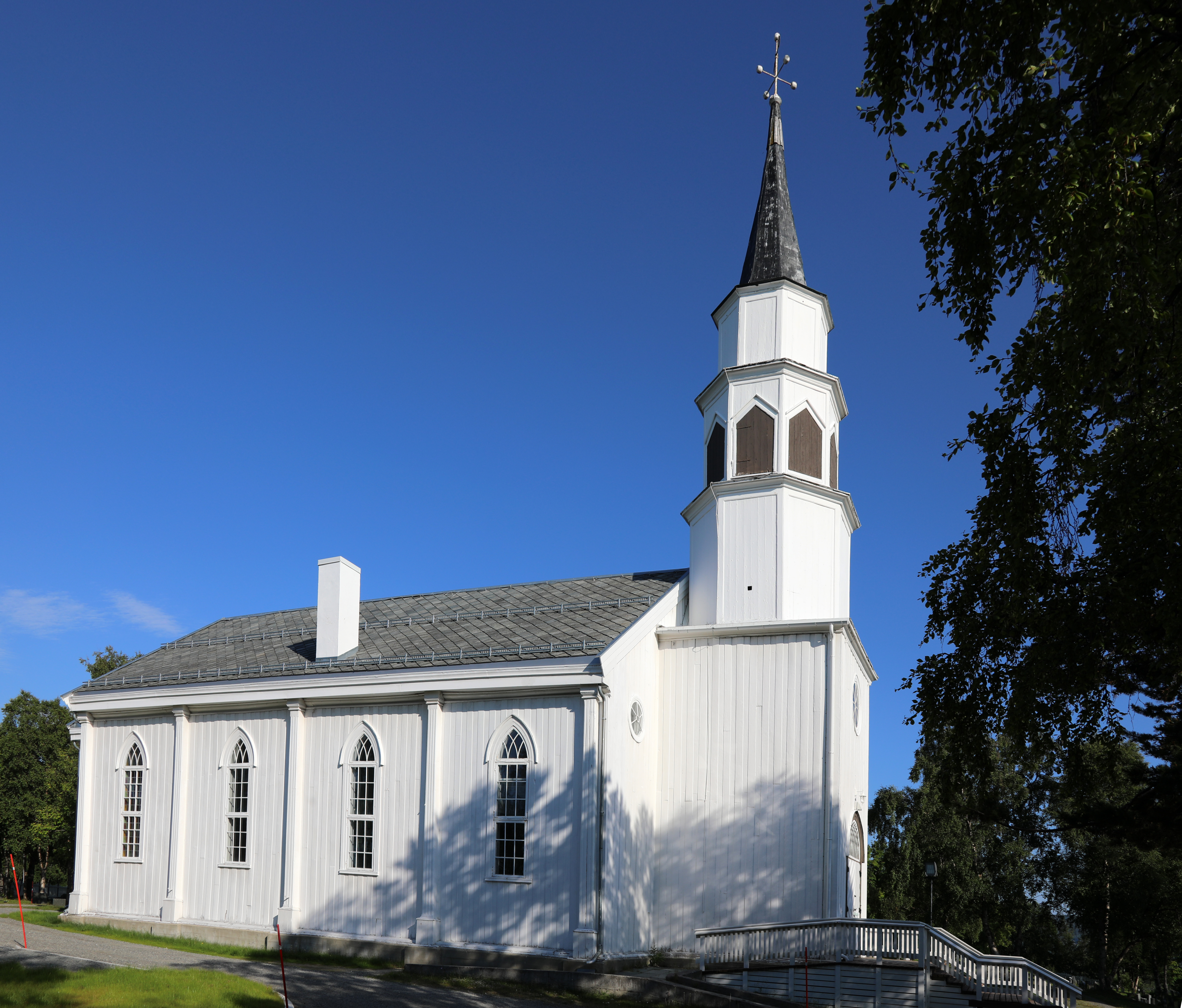
- View of the church
- Alta Church
- 69.964593°N 23.251777°E
- Location: Alta Municipality, Finnmark
- Country: Norway
- Denomination: Church of Norway
- Churchmanship: Evangelical Lutheran

History
- Status: Parish church

Architecture
- Functional status: Active
- Architect: Stephen Henry Thomas
- Architectural type: Long church
- Completed: 1858 (168 years ago)

Specifications
- Capacity: 230
- Materials: Wood

Administration
- Diocese: Nord-Hålogaland
- Deanery: Alta prosti
- Parish: Alta
- Norwegian Cultural Heritage Site
- Type: Church
- Status: Listed
- ID: 83773

Alta Church (Norwegian: Alta kirke) is a parish church of the Church of Norway in Alta Municipality in Finnmark county, Norway. It is located in the Bossekop area in the town of Alta. It is one of the churches for the Alta parish which is part of the Alta prosti (deanery) in the Diocese of Nord-Hålogaland. The white, wooden church was built in a long church style in 1858 using plans drawn up by the architect Stephen Henry Thomas. The church seats about 230 people.

== History ==
The first church built in Alta was the present building which was completed in 1858. The building was consecrated by the Bishop Knud Gislesen. The church was heavily damaged by the retreating German army in 1944 near the end of World War II. The church benches were burned, the windows were broken, and the electrical system was ruined. After the war, the church was renovated and restored in 1946–1948. The work was led by architect Kirsten Sjøgren-Erichsen. In 1968, electric heating was installed in the church. This church was the main church for the municipality until 2013 when the Northern Lights Cathedral was built as the new main church for the municipality and deanery.

== Media gallery ==
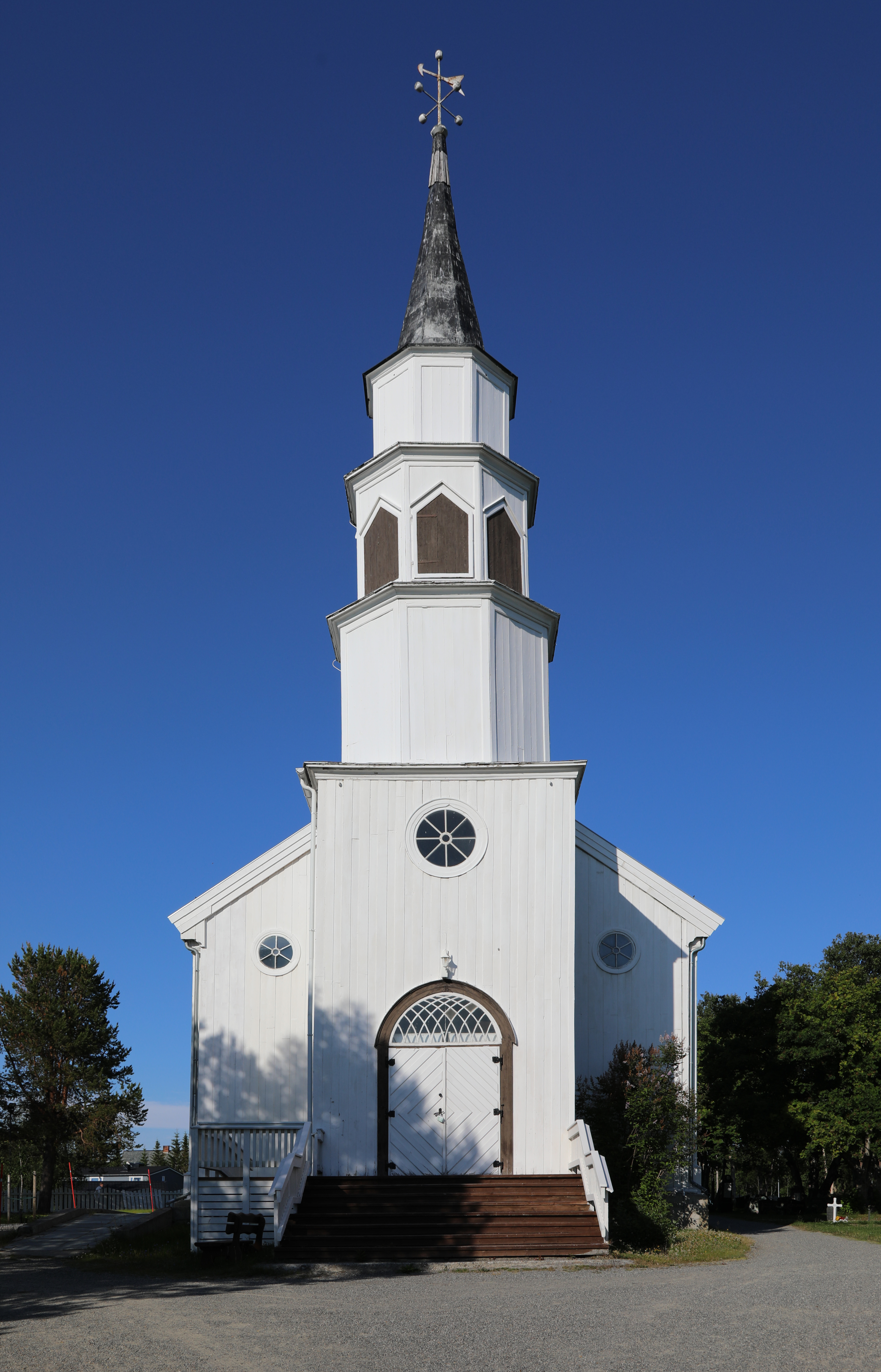
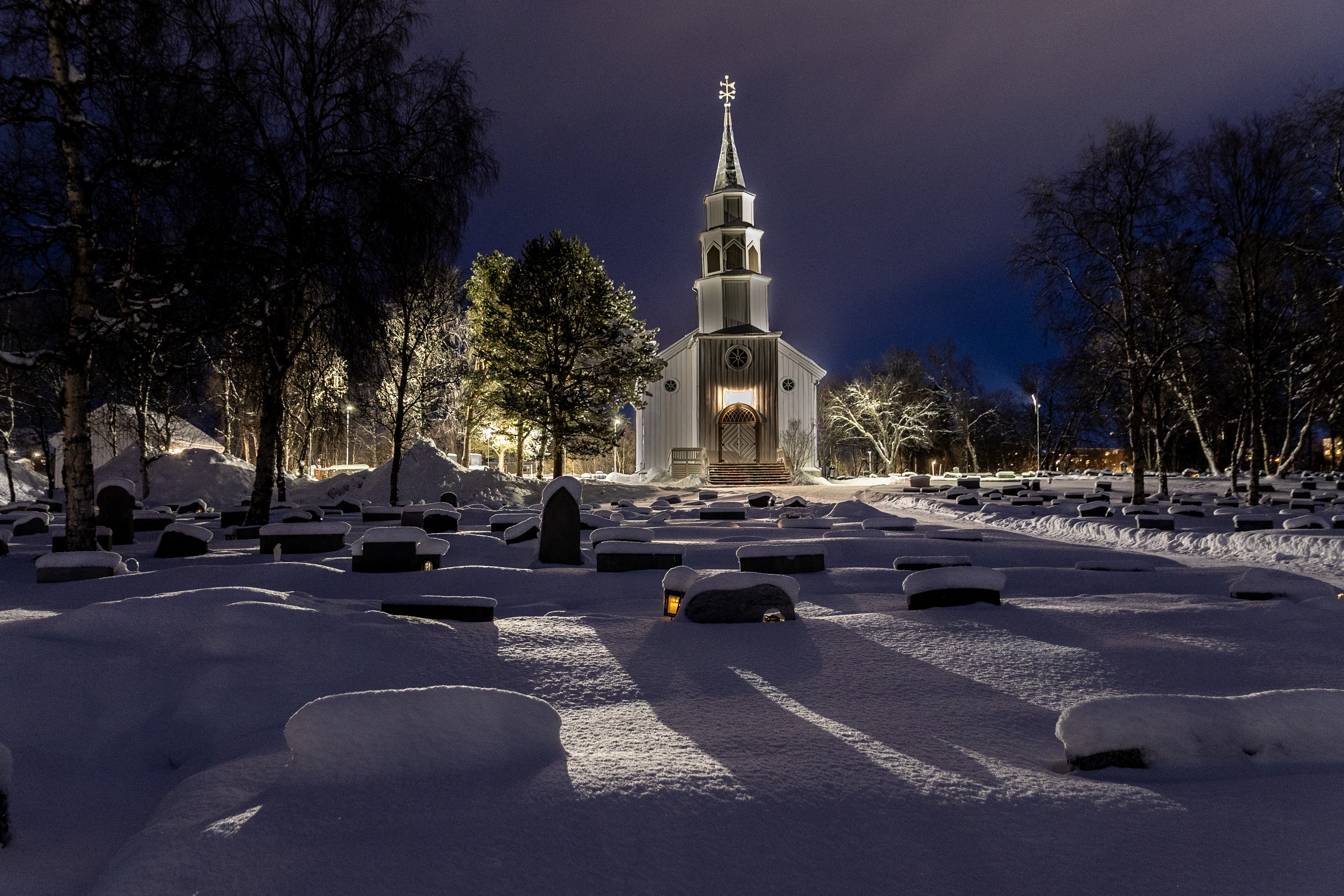
The old church in Alta, Finnmark, Norway.

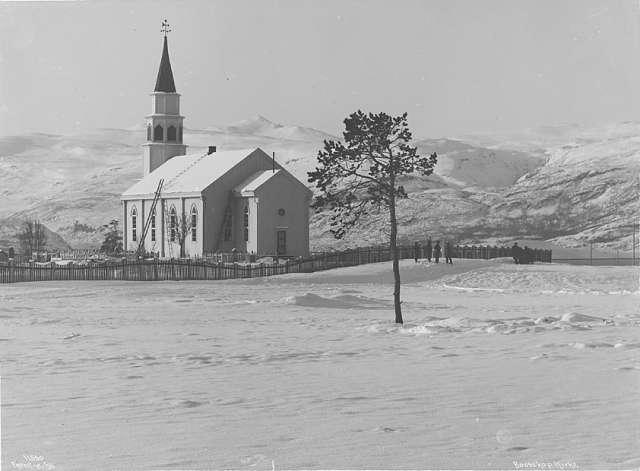

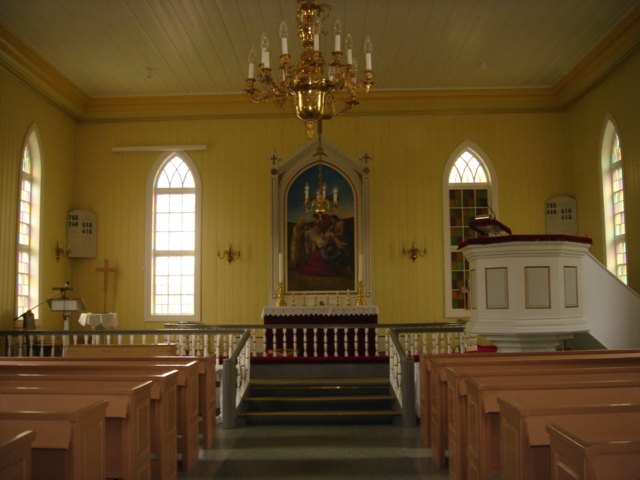

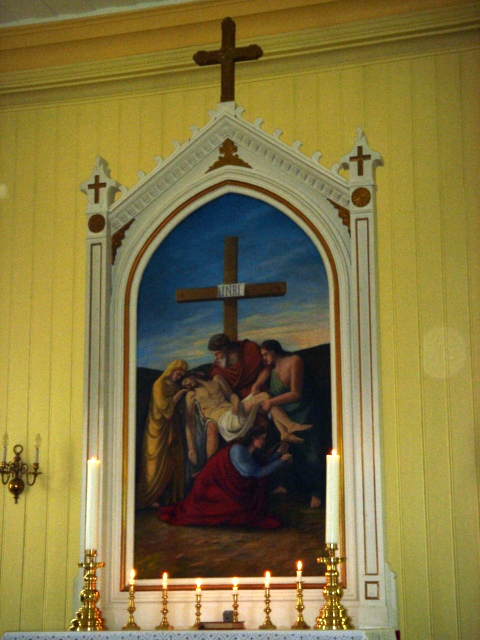

== See also ==
- List of churches in Nord-Hålogaland
