= Elvebakken =

Village in Alta Municipality, Norway

Elvebakken (Norwegian); Joganjálbmi (Northern Sami); Jovensuu (Kven)
- Borough
- Interactive map of: Elvebakken (Norwegian); Joganjálbmi (Northern Sami); Jovensuu (Kven)
- Location within Finnmark Location within Norway
- Coordinates: 69°58′10″N 23°22′24″E
- Country: Norway
- Region: Northern Norway
- County: Finnmark
- District: Vest-Finnmark
- Municipality: Alta Municipality
- Elevation: 4 m (13 ft)
- Time zone: UTC+01:00 (CET)
  - Summer (DST): UTC+02:00 (CEST)

Elvebakken (Norwegian)

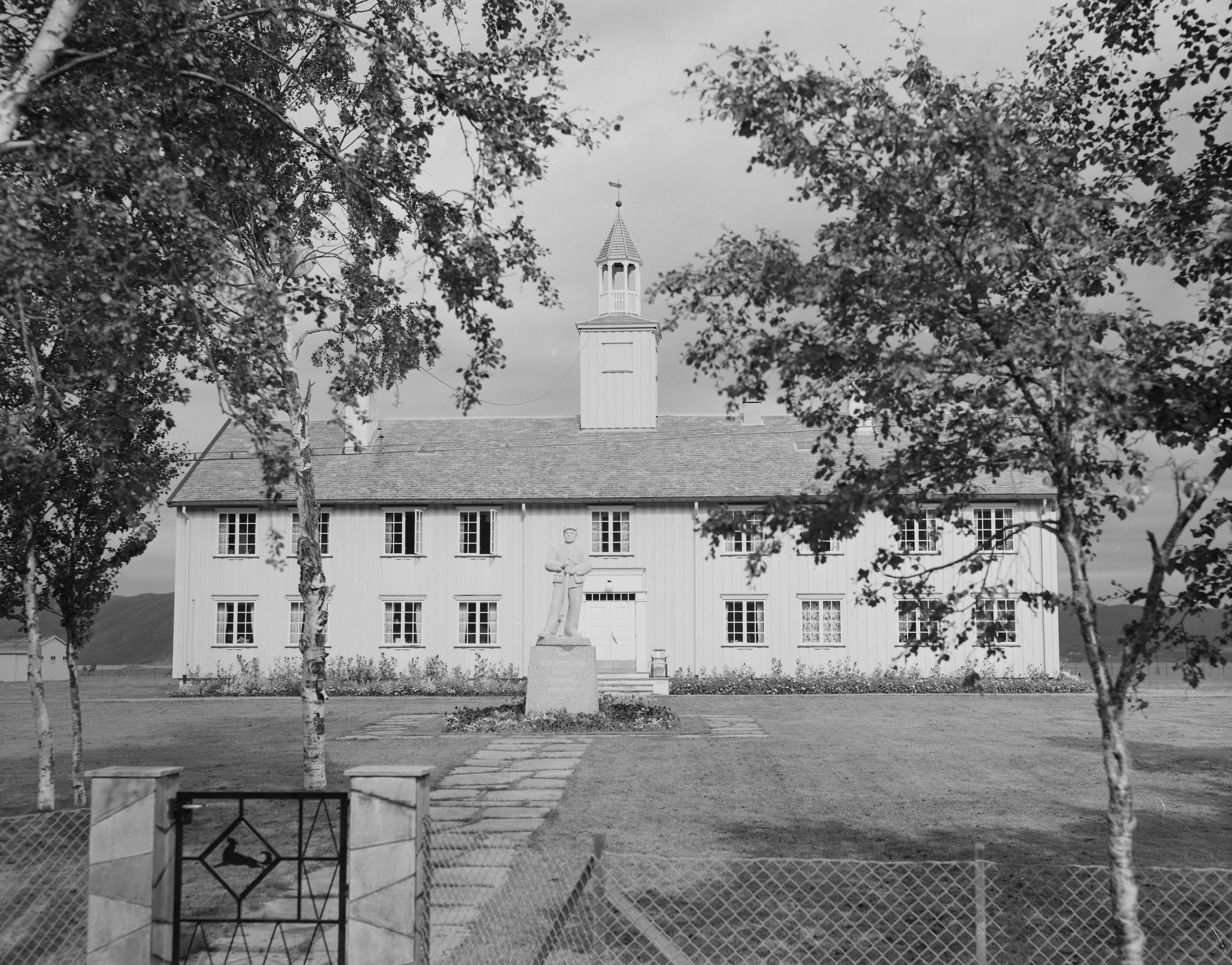
Elvebakken, Alta, Finnmark

, Joganjálbmi (Northern Sami), or Jovensuu (Kven) is one of the three boroughs that make up the town of Alta in Alta Municipality in Finnmark county, Norway. It is located along the Altafjorden at the delta of the river Altaelva. It makes up the eastern part of the town. The European route E06 highway passes through this part of the town and Alta Airport is located on the shore of the fjord.

== History ==
On 1 January 2000, the villages of Bossekop, Alta, and Elvebakken were merged to form the town of Alta.

Until 2005, Elvebakken was the headquarters of the Home Guard District 17. Elvebakken Church is located in this part of the town.
