= Alta (town) =

City/town within Alta Municipality, Finnmark, Norway

Alta: Alta (Norwegian); Áltá (Northern Sami); Alattio (Kven)
- Town/City
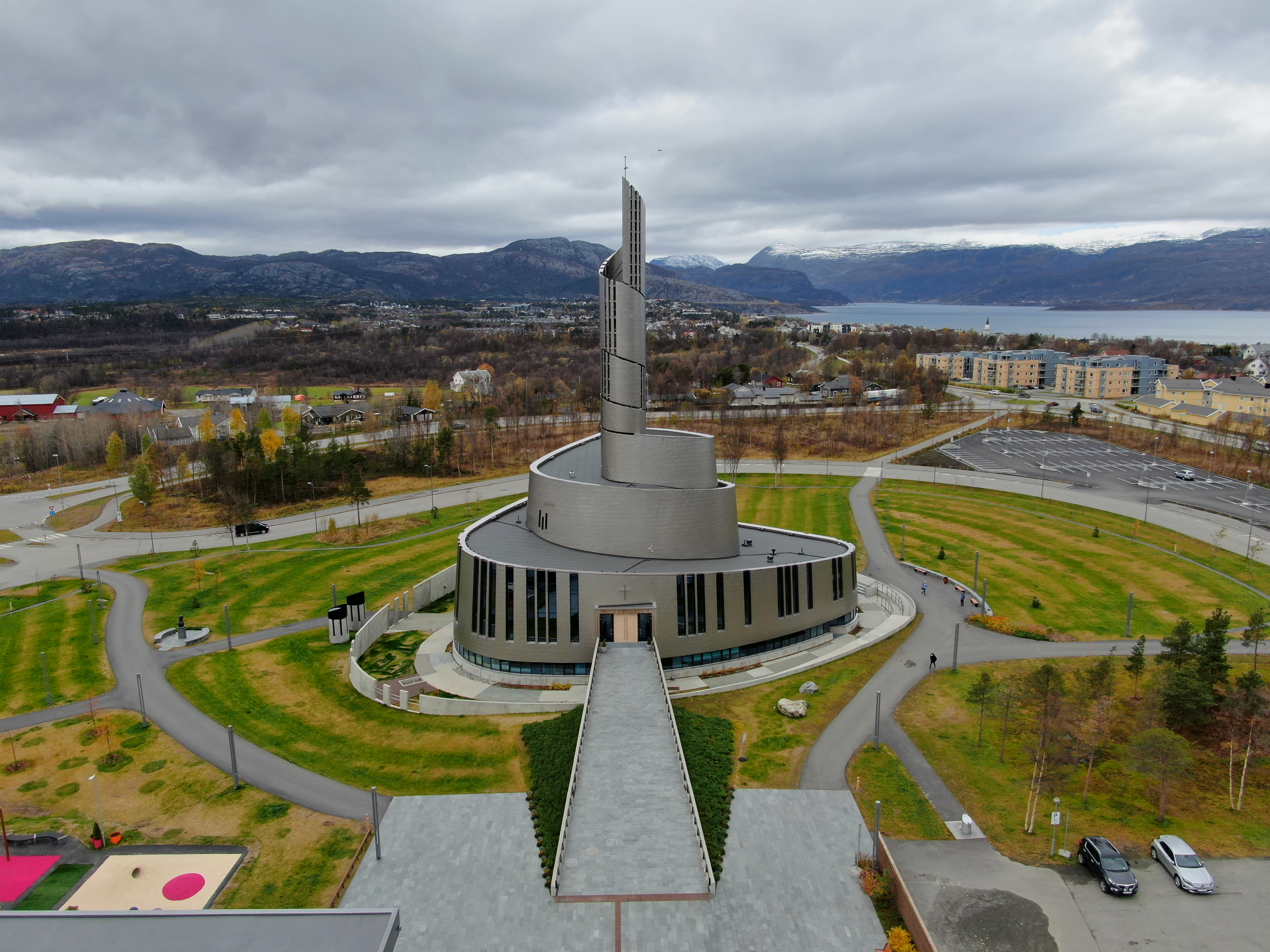
- View of parts of the town
- Interactive map of Alta
- Location within Finnmark Location within Norway
- Coordinates: 69°58′0″N 23°16′24″E
- Country: Norway
- Region: Northern Norway
- County: Finnmark
- District: Vest-Finnmark
- Municipality: Alta Municipality
- Established as
- Town (By): 2000

Area
  - Total: 9.81 km^{2} (3.79 sq mi)
- Elevation: 60 m (200 ft)

Population (2023)
  - Total: 15,931
  - Density: 1,624/km^{2} (4,210/sq mi)
- Demonym: Altaværing
- Time zone: UTC+01:00 (CET)
  - Summer (DST): UTC+02:00 (CEST)
- Post Code: 9509 Alta

Alta (Norwegian; pronounced [ˈɑ̂ɫtɑ]), Áltá (Northern Sami), or Alattio (Kven) is a town in Alta Municipality in Finnmark county, Norway. The town is the administrative centre of the municipality and the major commercial centre in the western part of the county of Finnmark. The town is located on the southern end of Altafjorden at the mouth of the river Altaelva. There are several suburbs around the town: Kåfjord, Kvenvik, and Jiepmaluokta lie to the west; Øvre Alta and Tverrelvdalen lie to the south; and Rafsbotn lies to the east. The famous rock carvings at Alta lie just to the west of the town.

Alta is the largest town in Finnmark county. It is known as Nordlysbyen ("The Northern Lights City") and is one of the northernmost cities in the world with a population exceeding 10,000. The 9.81-square-kilometre (2,420-acre) town has a population (2023) of 15,931 and a population density of 1,624 inhabitants per square kilometre (4,210/sq mi).

The town of Alta has four churches: the historic Alta Church in Bossekop, the relatively new Elvebakken Church in Elvebakken, St. Joseph's Church (St. Josef kirke) the Catholic church in Alta; and the Northern Lights Cathedral (the new "main" church for the municipality that was completed in 2013). Alta is also an educational centre in Finnmark county. The Alta campus of the University of Tromsø is located in the town as well as the local primary and secondary schools, including Alta Upper Secondary School. The Vestre Finnmark District Court has one of its two courthouses in the town, serving Loppa Municipality and Alta Municipality. Alta IF is the main sports team for the town.

== History ==
The town of Alta was established in 2000 when the three neighboring villages of Bossekop, Elvebakken, and Alta were joined and declared to be a town by the municipal council.

=== Name ===
The town (originally the village) is named after the local Altafjorden. The name possibly comes from the Old Norse words ǫlpt or alpt which refer to a swan. It could also be the Norwegianization of the Finnish word (alaattia) which refers to a "lowland". Historically, the name of the municipality (and the village) was spelled Alten. On 3 November 1917, a royal resolution changed the spelling of the name of the municipality to Alta.

== Transportation ==
Alta is a centre of transportation in Finnmark county. The town has port facilities along Altafjorden, just alongside Alta Airport in Elvebakken. The airport has direct flights to Frankfurt, Helsinki, Oslo, Tromsø, and certain other towns in Norway like Vadsø, Kirkenes, Hammerfest and Berlevåg. The European route E6 highway also runs through the town and the European route E45 has its northern terminus in the town. The main industries present in Alta include a concrete product factory; several wood mills and sawmills; and dairy, horticulture trade, and maritime services.

=== Climate ===
Climate data for Alta Airport, Finnmark (1991–2020)
Month	Jan	Feb	Mar	Apr	May	Jun	Jul	Aug	Sep	Oct	Nov	Dec	Year
Mean daily maximum °C (°F)	−3.3 (26.1)	−3.6 (25.5)	−0.4 (31.3)	3.7 (38.7)	8.8 (47.8)	13.7 (56.7)	17.6 (63.7)	16 (61)	11.5 (52.7)	4.9 (40.8)	0.3 (32.5)	−1.5 (29.3)	5.7 (42.3)
Daily mean °C (°F)	−6.8 (19.8)	−7 (19)	−4 (25)	0.4 (32.7)	5.5 (41.9)	10.1 (50.2)	13.7 (56.7)	12.3 (54.1)	8.2 (46.8)	2.3 (36.1)	−2.8 (27.0)	−4.9 (23.2)	2.3 (36.1)
Mean daily minimum °C (°F)	−10.2 (13.6)	−10.3 (13.5)	−7.4 (18.7)	−2.8 (27.0)	2.5 (36.5)	7.4 (45.3)	10.9 (51.6)	9.5 (49.1)	5.6 (42.1)	−0.1 (31.8)	−5.5 (22.1)	−8 (18)	−0.7 (30.7)
Average precipitation mm (inches)	39 (1.5)	28.6 (1.13)	33.1 (1.30)	24.2 (0.95)	25.9 (1.02)	38.9 (1.53)	50.3 (1.98)	47.1 (1.85)	37.3 (1.47)	45.1 (1.78)	31.6 (1.24)	37.2 (1.46)	438.3 (17.26)
Source: National Oceanic and Atmospheric Administration

== Media gallery ==
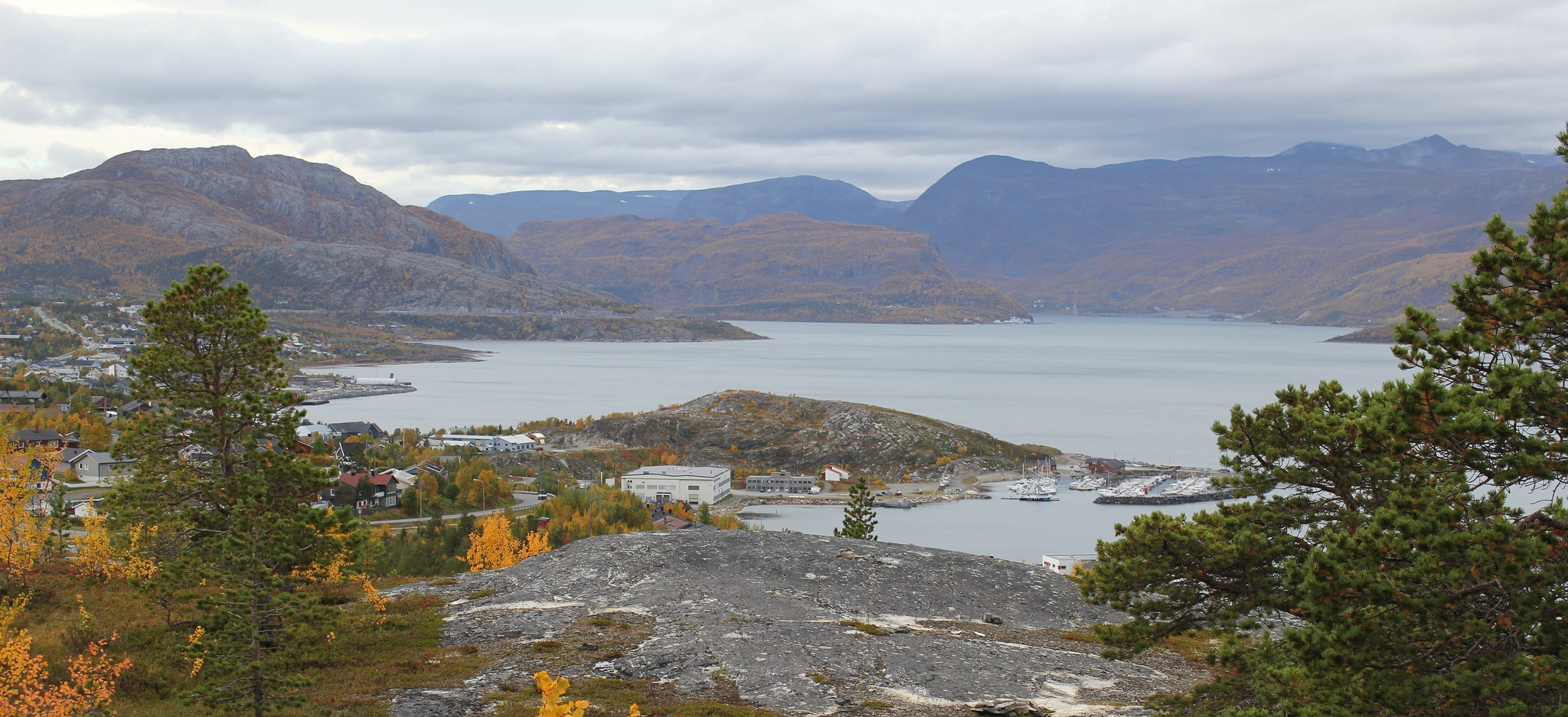

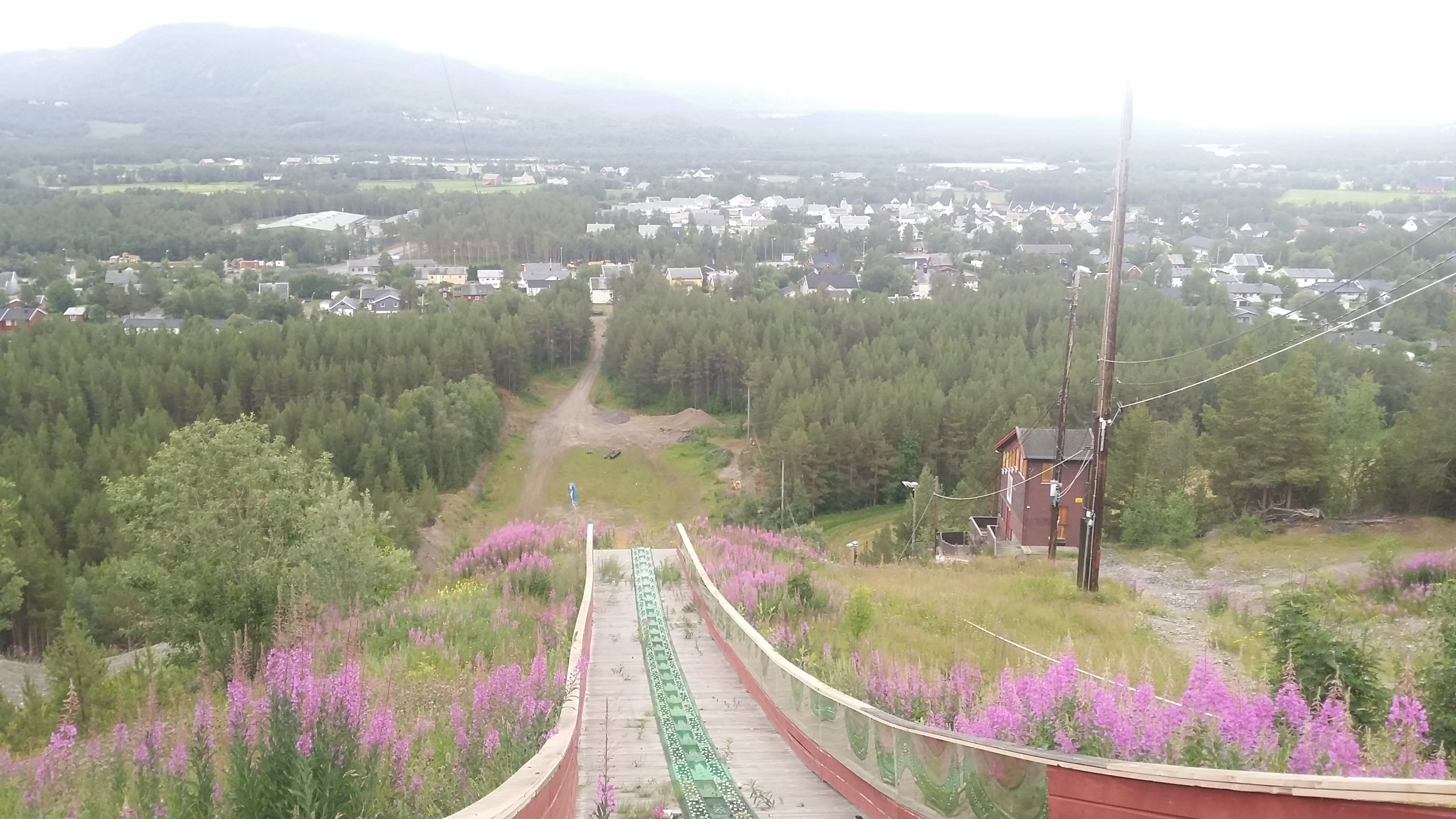

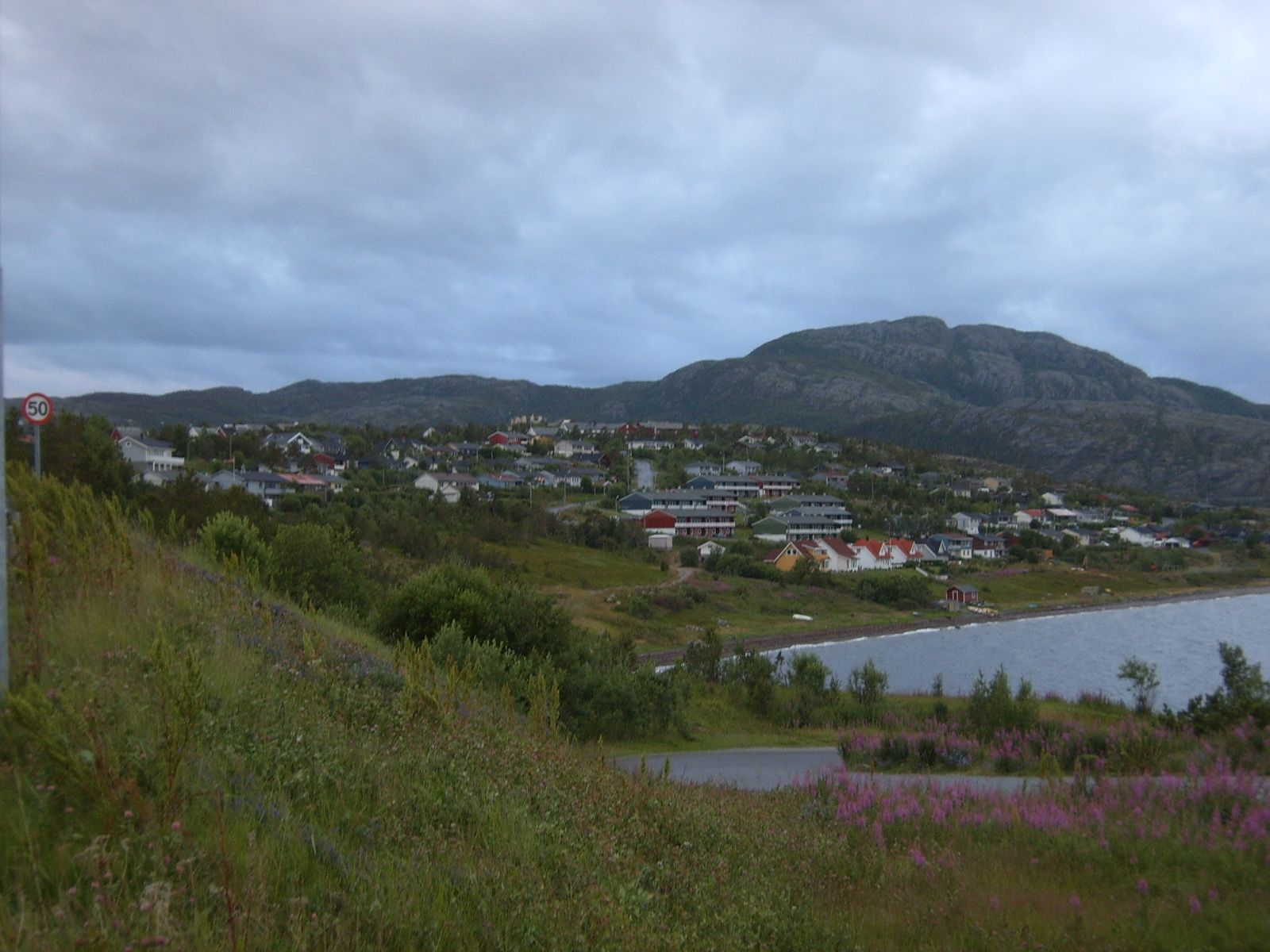

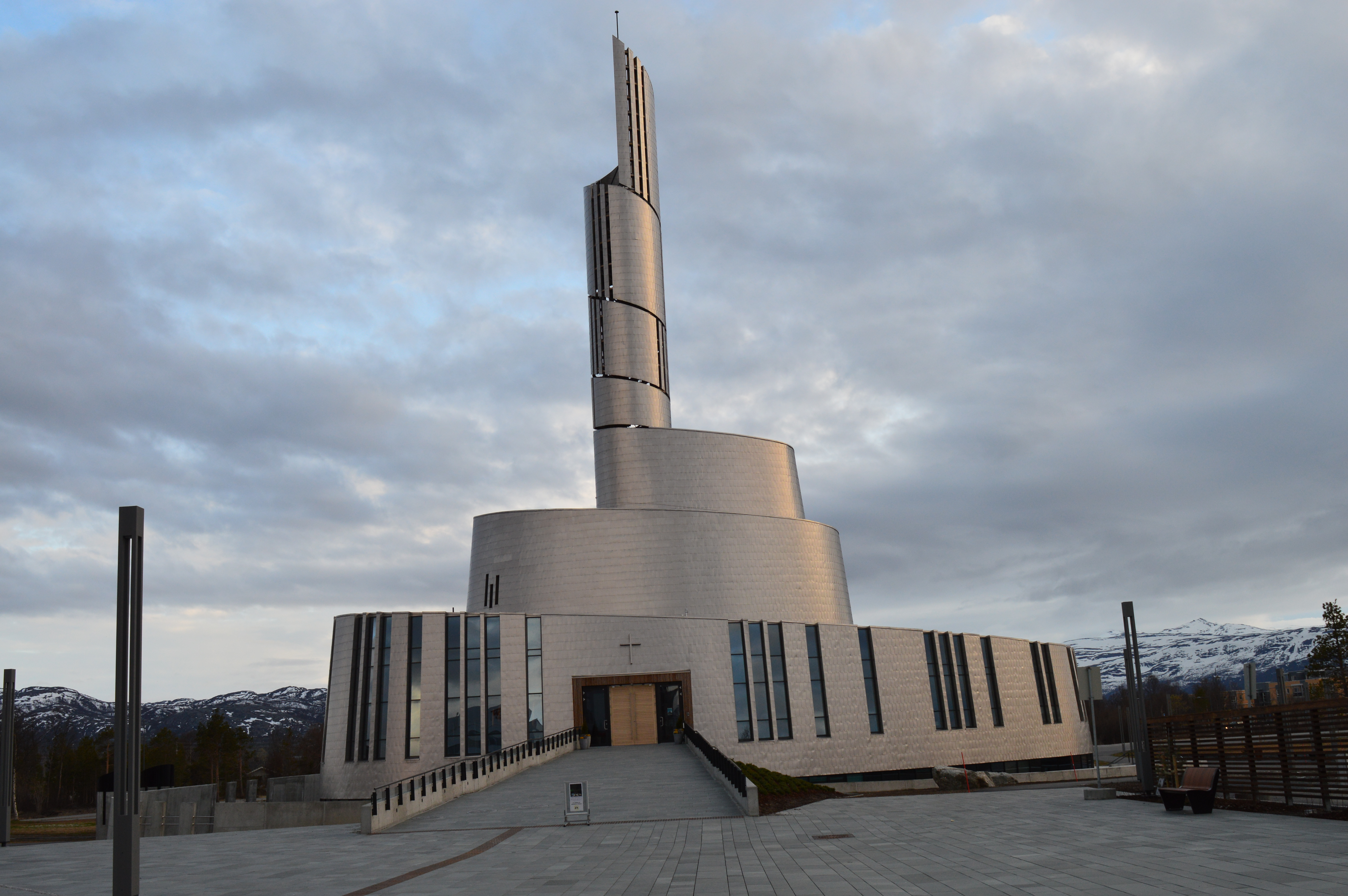

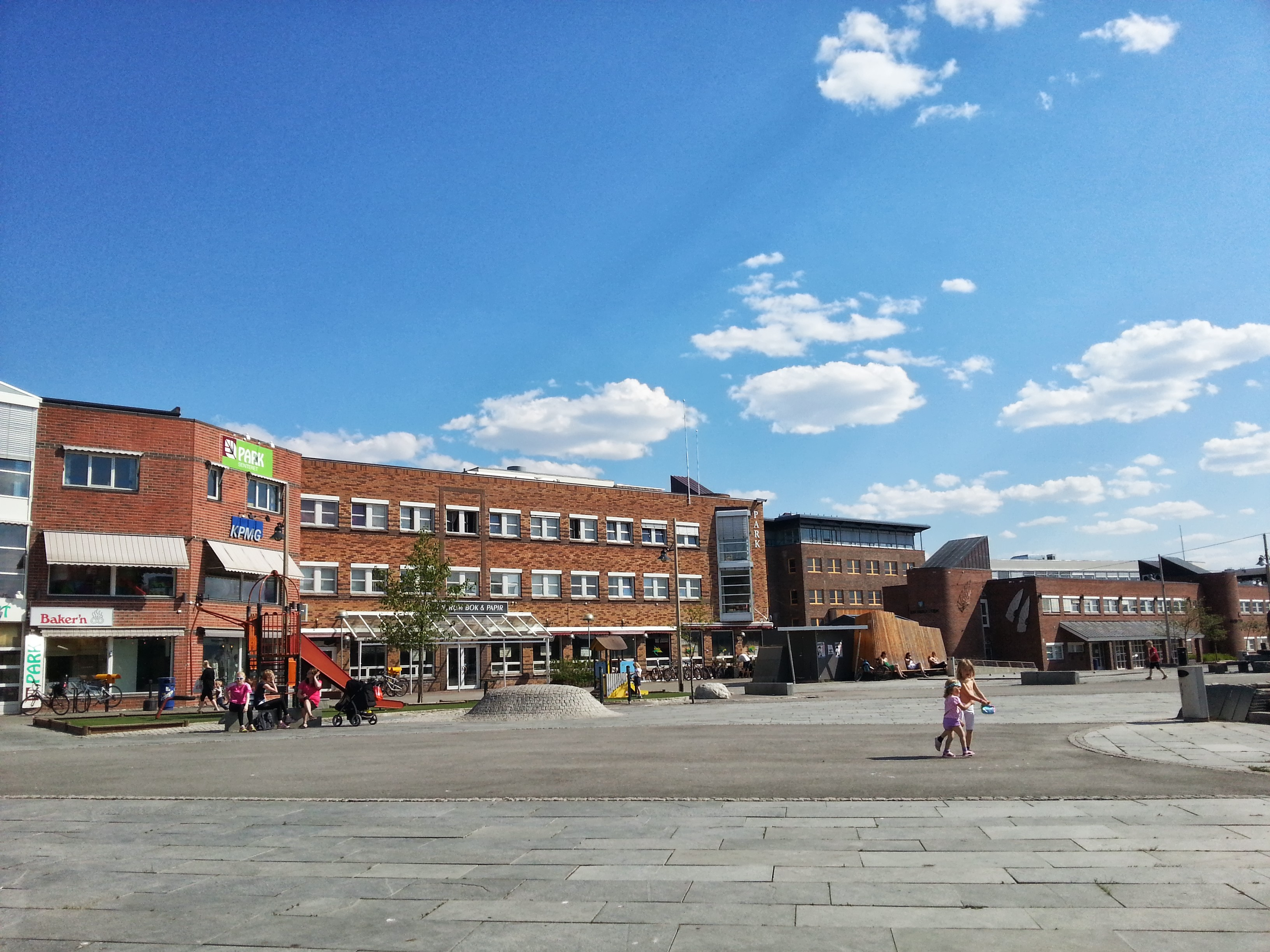

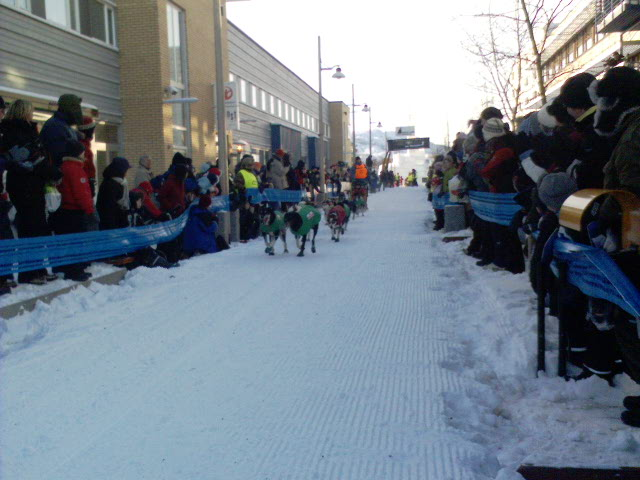

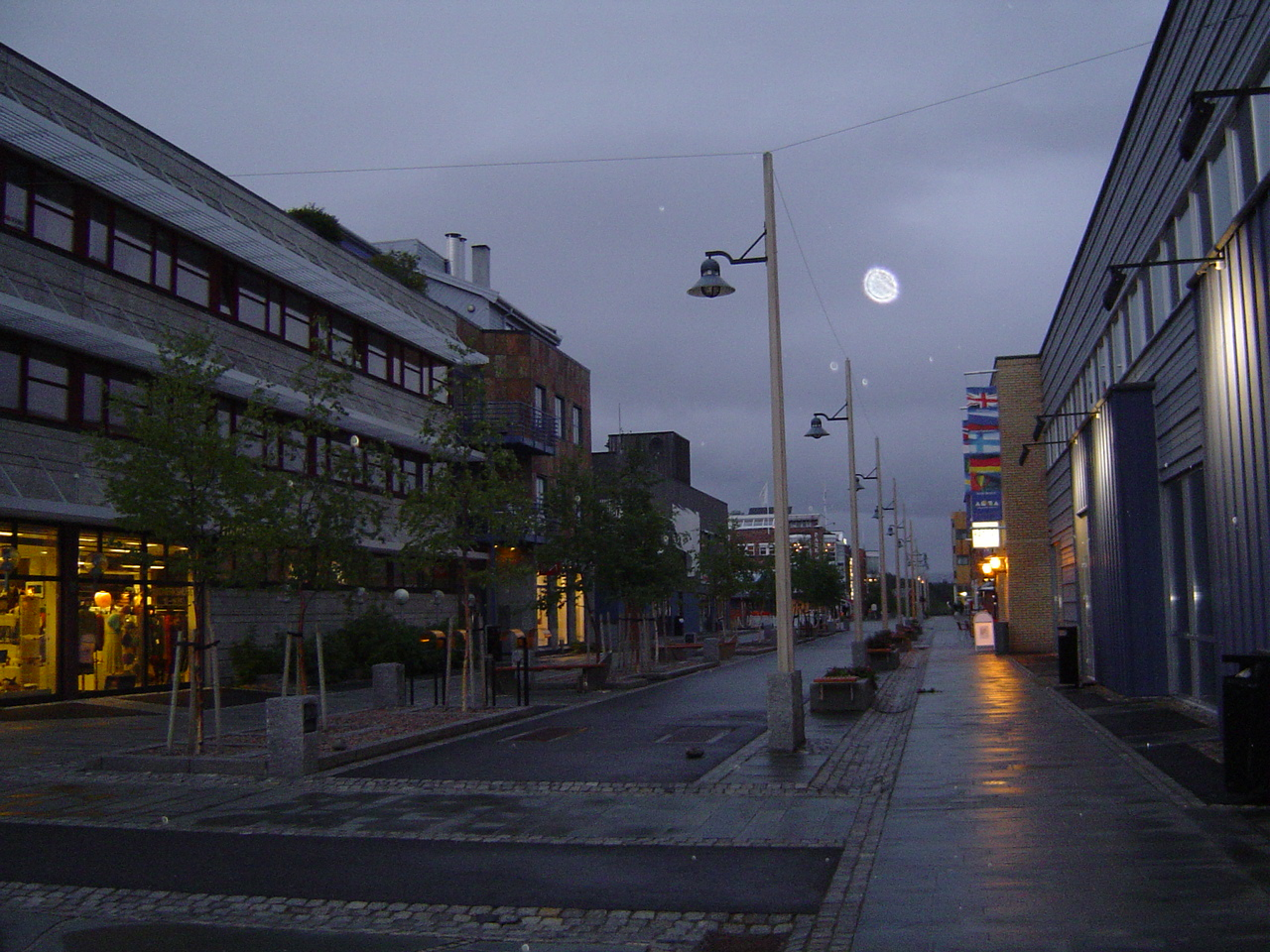

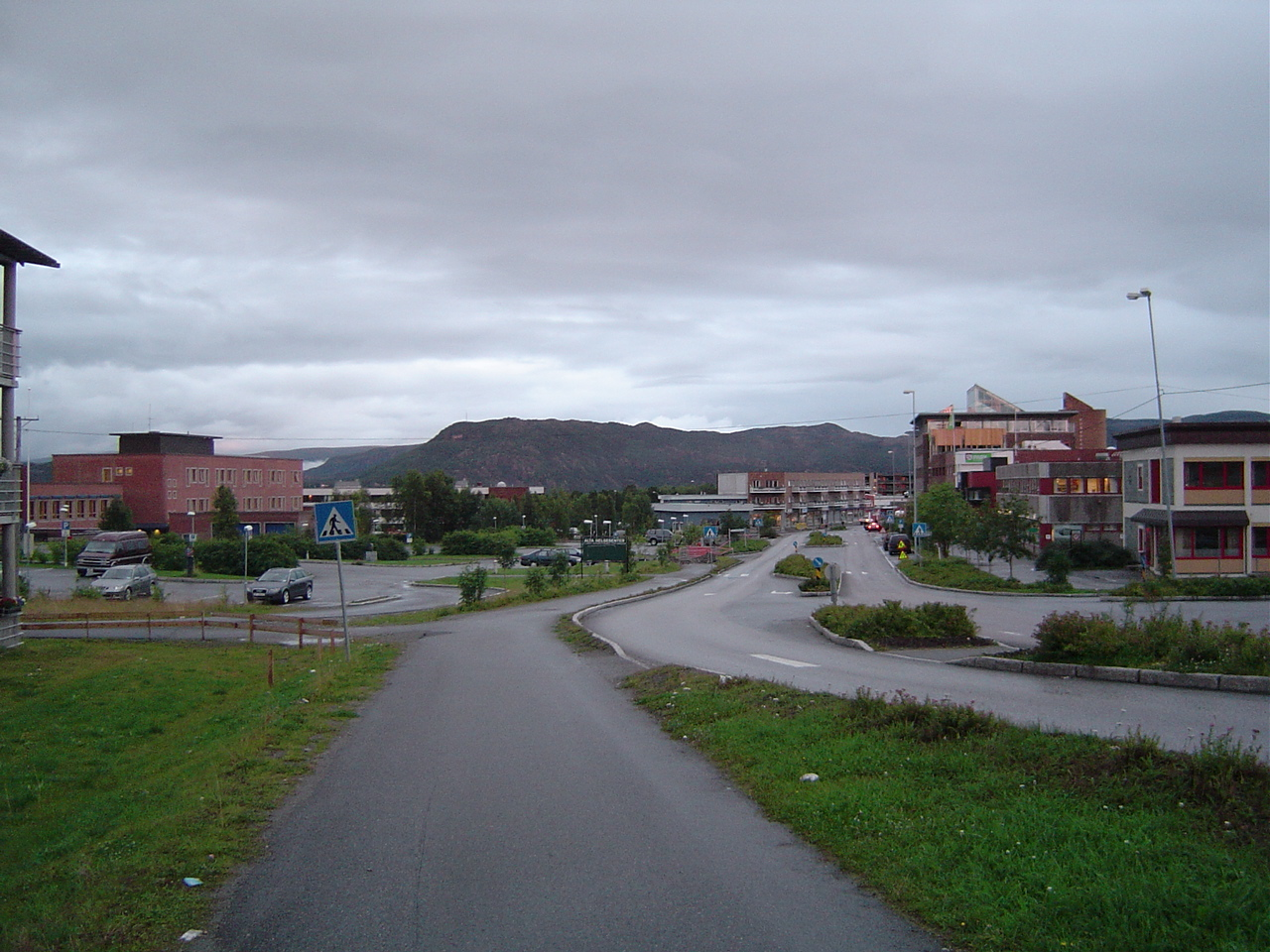

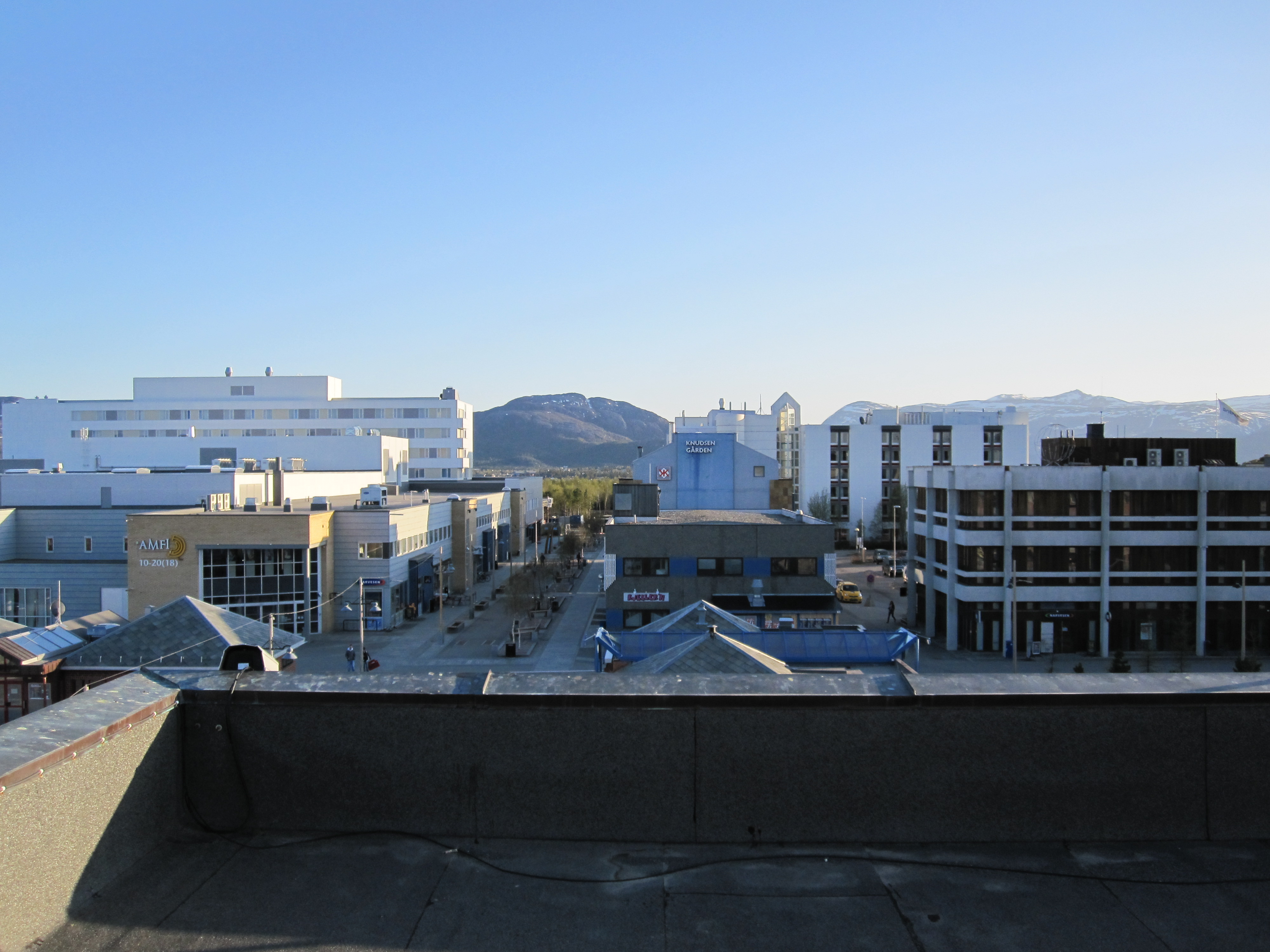

== See also ==
- List of towns and cities in Norway
