= Northern Lights Cathedral =

Northern Lights Cathedral Alta Church
- Nordlyskatedralen - Alta Kirke
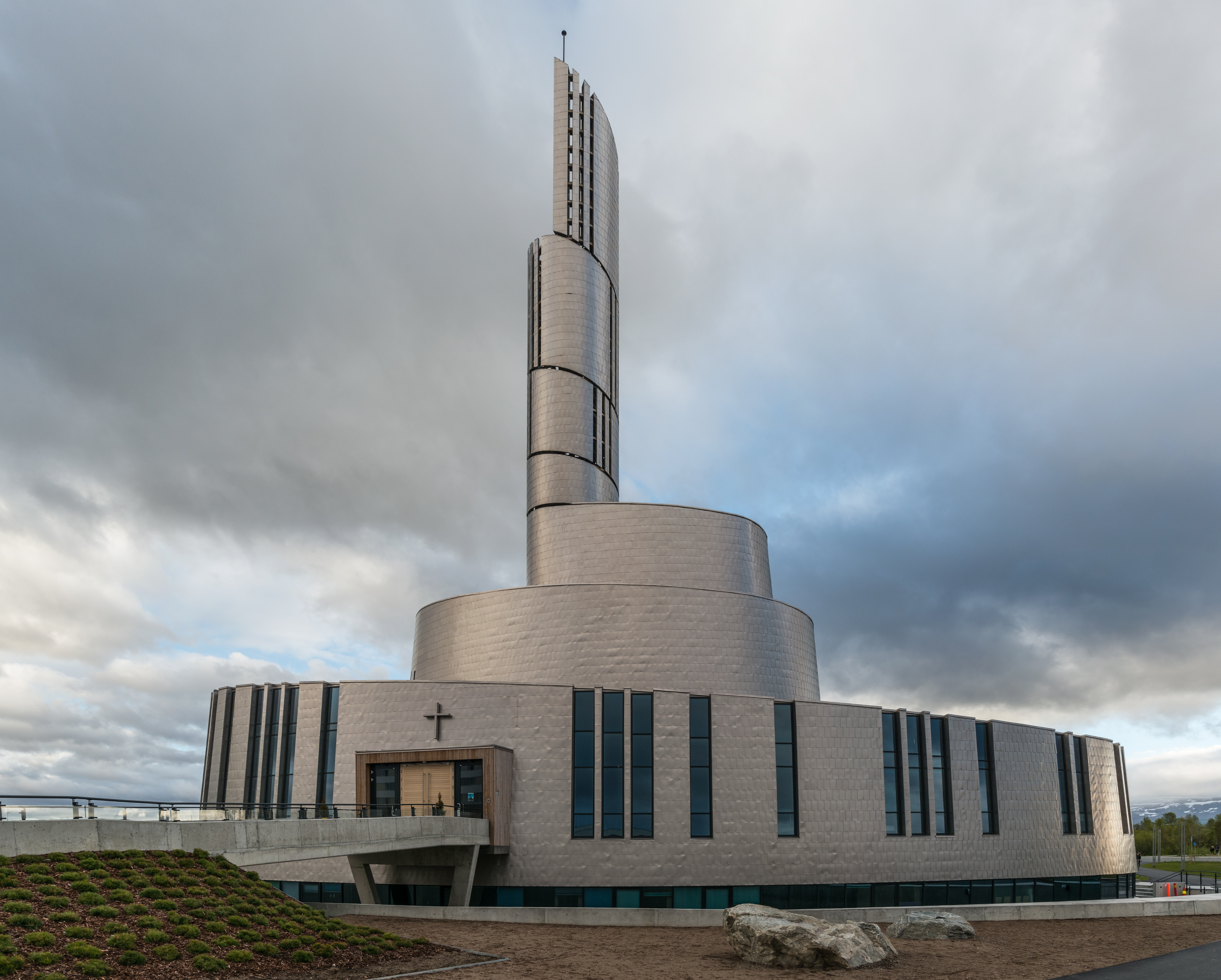
- View of the church
- Northern Lights Cathedral; Alta Church
- 69.965107°N 23.266816°E
- Location: Alta Municipality, Finnmark
- Country: Norway
- Denomination: Church of Norway
- Churchmanship: Evangelical Lutheran
- Website: nordlyskatedral.no

History
- Status: Parish church
- Founded: 2013
- Consecrated: 10 Feb 2013

Architecture
- Functional status: Active
- Architect: LINK arkitektur
- Architectural type: Circular
- Completed: 2013 (13 years ago)

Specifications
- Capacity: 350
- Materials: Concrete

Administration
- Diocese: Nord-Hålogaland
- Deanery: Alta prosti
- Parish: Alta

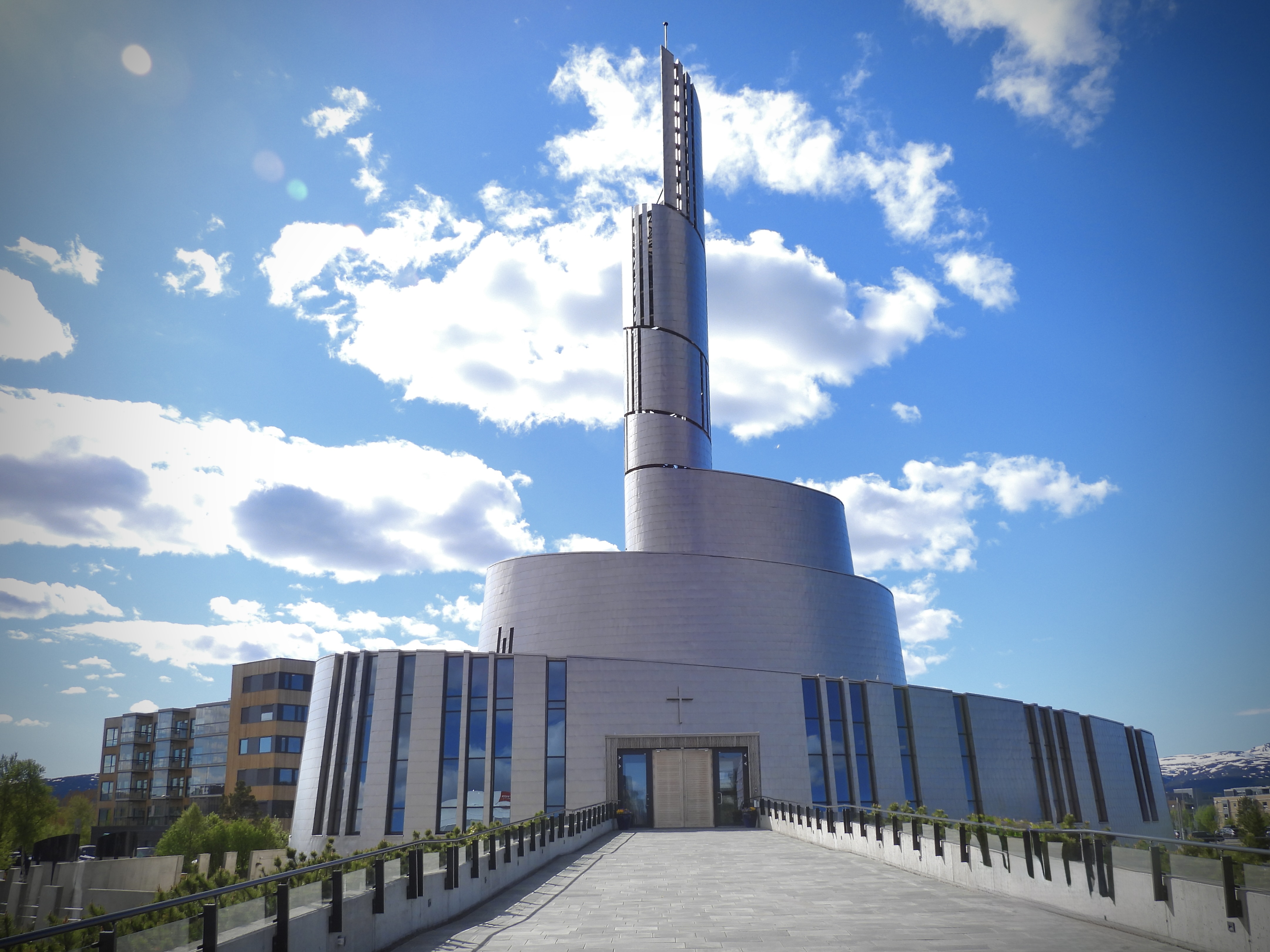
The Northern Lights Cathedral.

The Northern Lights Cathedral - Alta Church (Norwegian: Nordlyskatedralen - Alta Kirke) is a parish church of the Church of Norway in Alta Municipality in Finnmark county. It is located in the central part of the town of Alta. It is the main church for the Alta parish as well as the seat of the Alta prosti (deanery) in the Diocese of Nord-Hålogaland. The modern church was built in a circular style in 2013 using plans drawn up by the architectural firm LINK arkitektur, in collaboration with Schmidt Hammer Lassen Architects. The church seats about 350 people. Prior to the opening of this church, the main church for the parish was the historic Alta Church.

== Design ==
The church construction period was 2009–2013. The building was constructed of concrete and wood with external cladding of titanium sheets. The central feature is its large spiral with belfry. The interior contains artwork by the artist Peter Brandes.

The cathedral is the result of an architectural competition launched in 2001 and was designed by Schmidt Hammer Lassen Architects in collaboration with architect Kolbjørn Jenssen of Link Arkitektur. It was consecrated on 10 February 2013 by the Bishop Per Oskar Kjølaas, with the Crown Princess Mette Marit in attendance. The church was built to replace the old Alta Church as the main church for the parish and deanery.

== Name ==
The "Northern Lights" are the Aurora Borealis associated with the Arctic night sky. At the opening service, bishop Per Oskar Kjølaas admitted that the word katedrale was contentious since it technically meant not a parish church but a cathedral (for which the more common Norwegian word is domkirke). He defended the name by the informal precedents of the Lofotkatedralen and Ishavskatedralen, and argued that a bishop is at home in all churches of the diocese.

== Media gallery ==
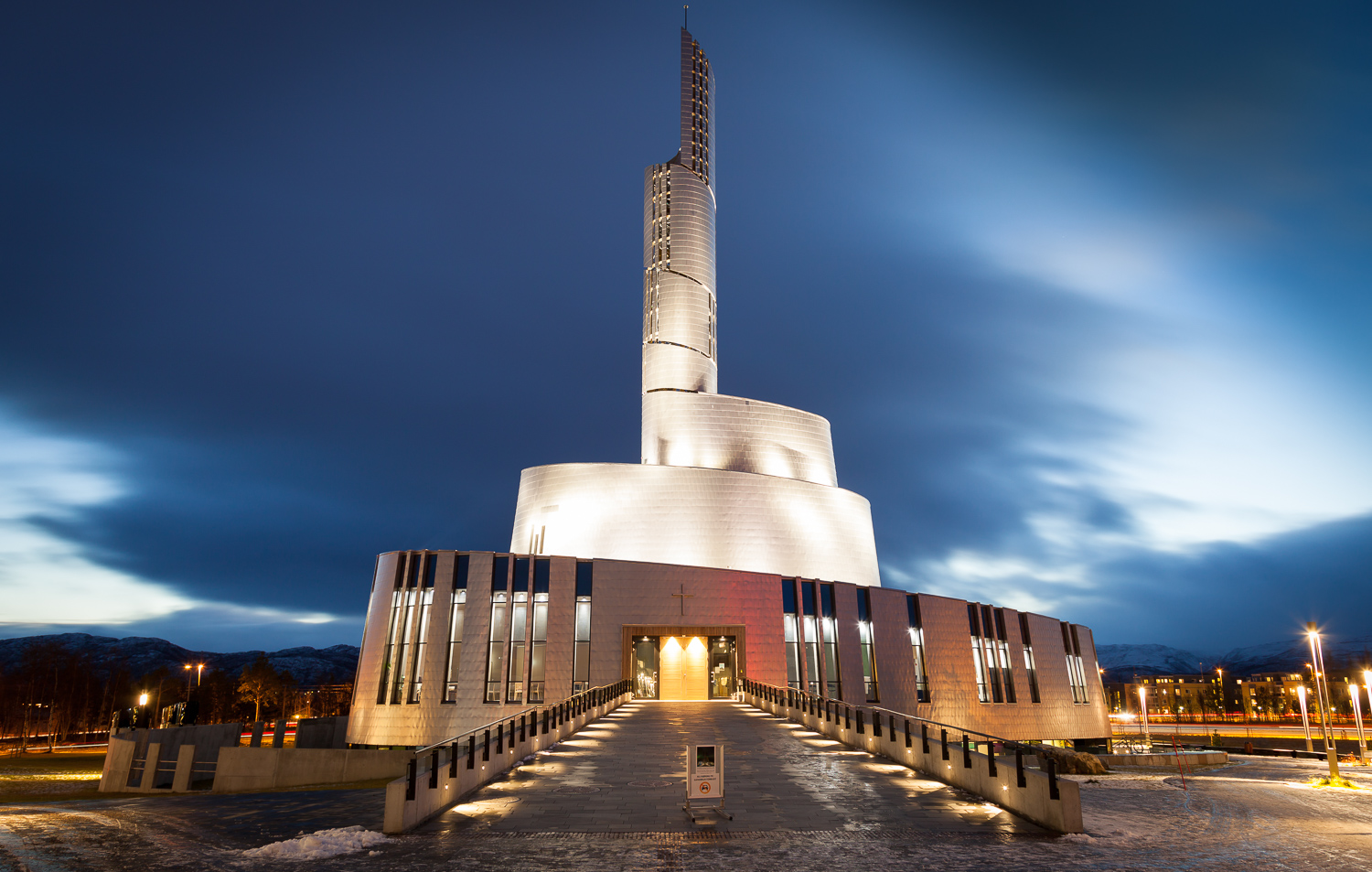
Nordlyskatedralen Entrance

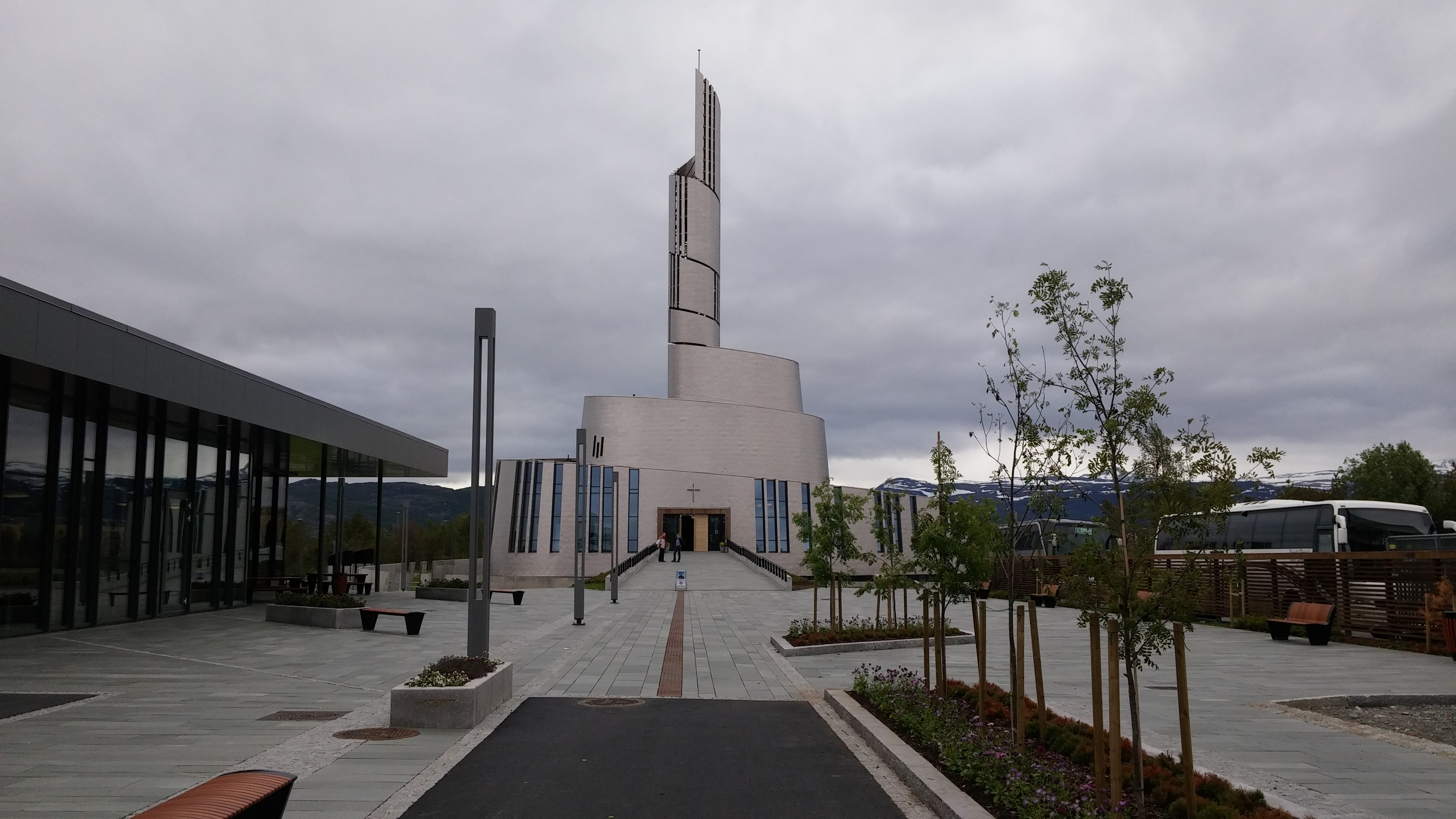
Outer courtyard

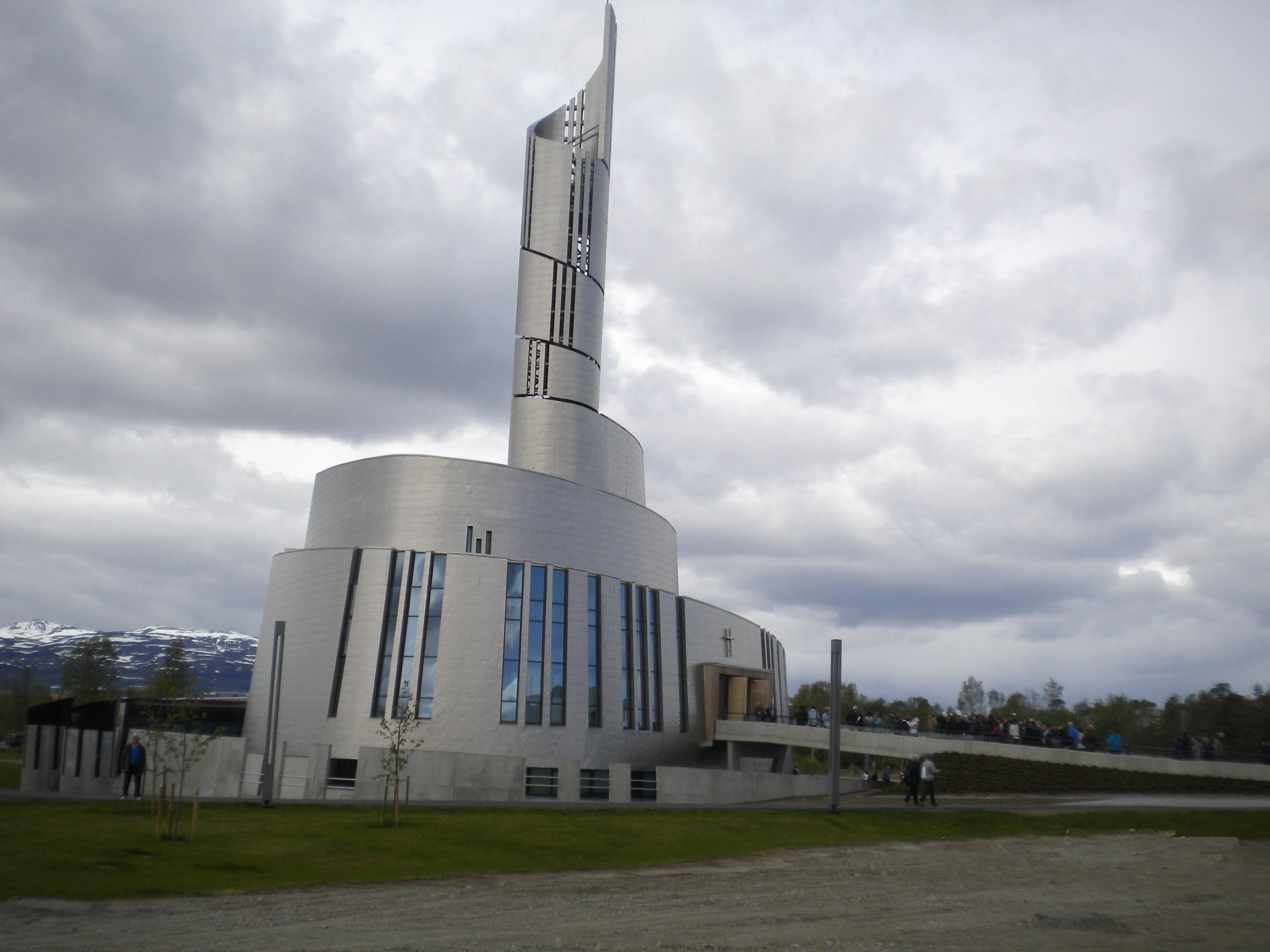
Exterior view

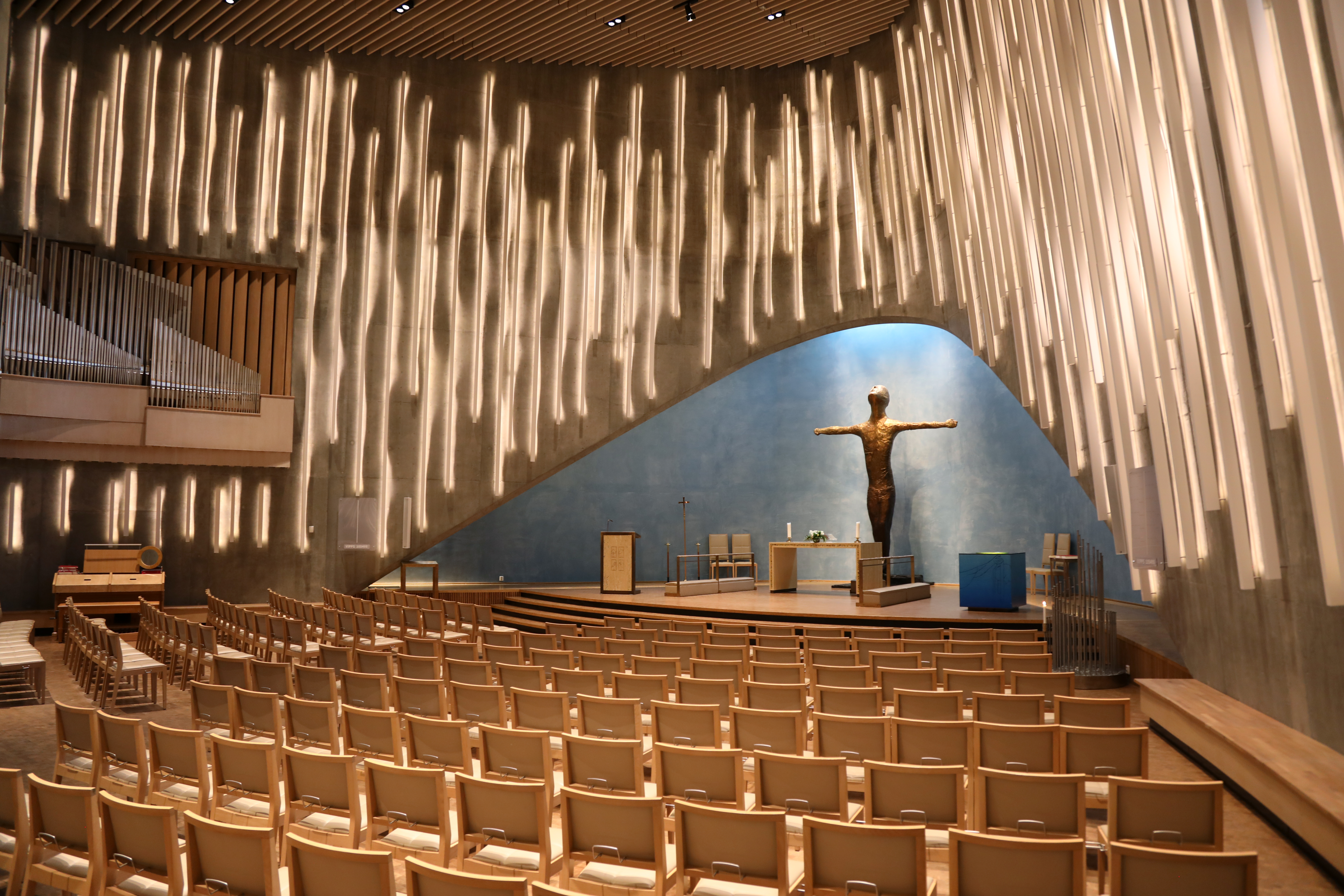
Interior view

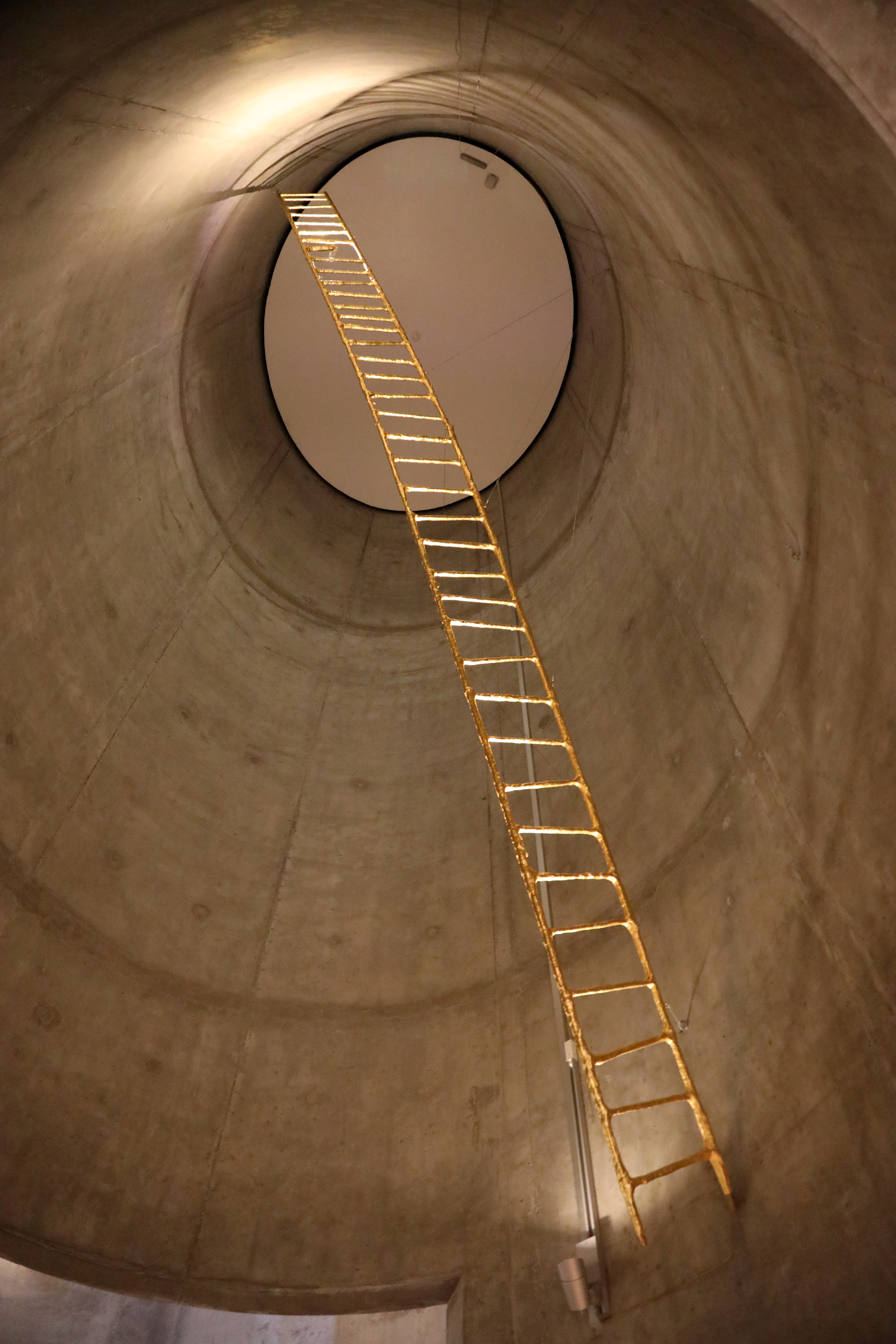
Nordlyskatedralen Organ

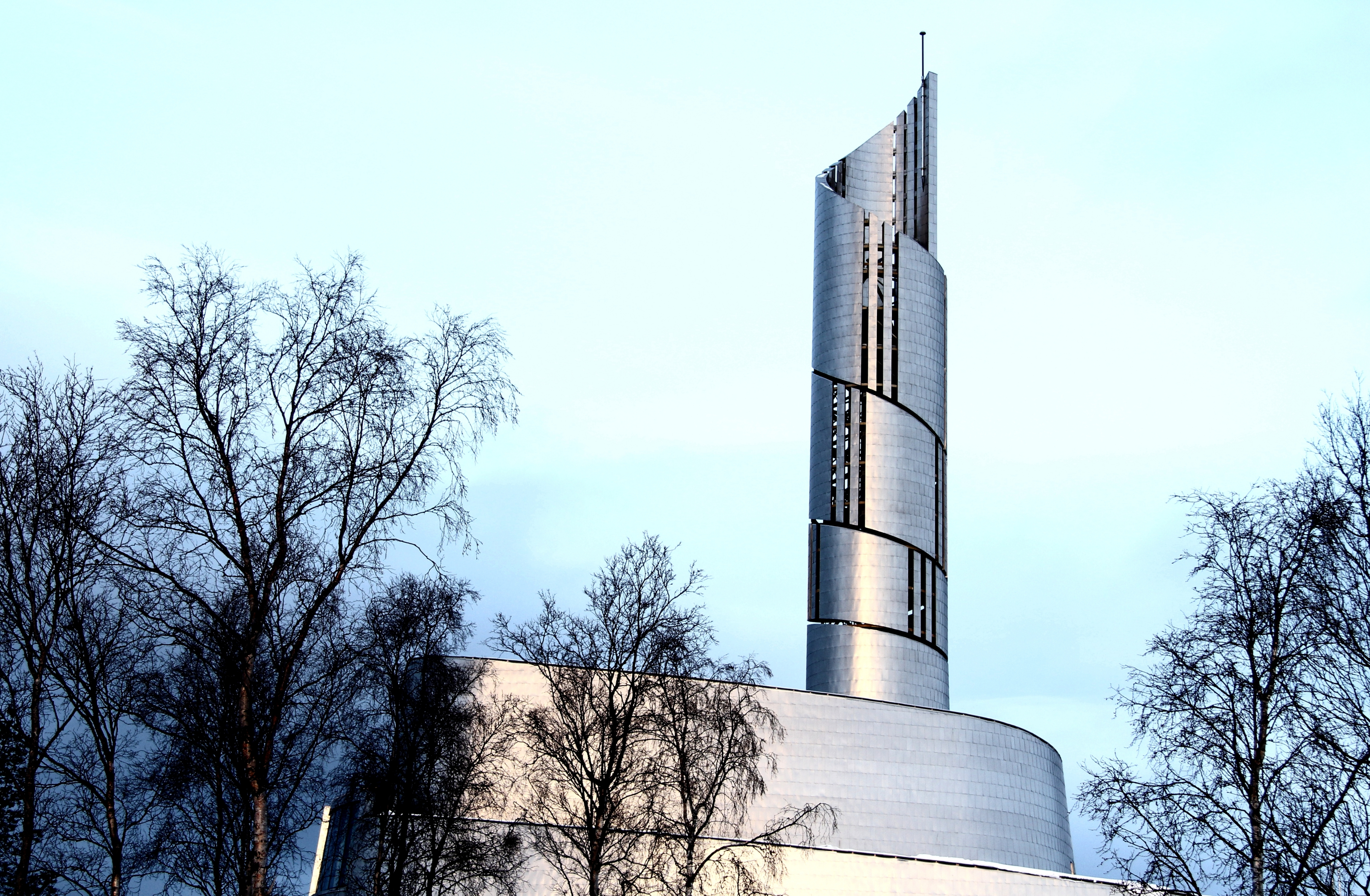
Nordlyskatedralen Spiral

== See also ==
- List of churches in Nord-Hålogaland
