= Hasvik =

Hasvik may refer to:

== Places ==
- Hasvik Municipality, a municipality in Finnmark county, Norway
- Hasvik (village), a village in Hasvik Municipality in Finnmark county, Norway
- Hasvik Church, a church in Hasvik Municipality in Finnmark county, Norway
- Hasvik Airport, an airport in Hasvik Municipality in Finnmark county, Norway
- Hasvik, Sweden, a village in Östhammar Municipality in Uppsala county, Sweden
