= FK Sørøy Glimt =

Norwegian football club

- Full name: Fotballklubben Sørøy Glimt
- Founded: 6 November 1987
- Ground: Hasvik stadion, Hasvik
- League: Fourth Division
Home colours

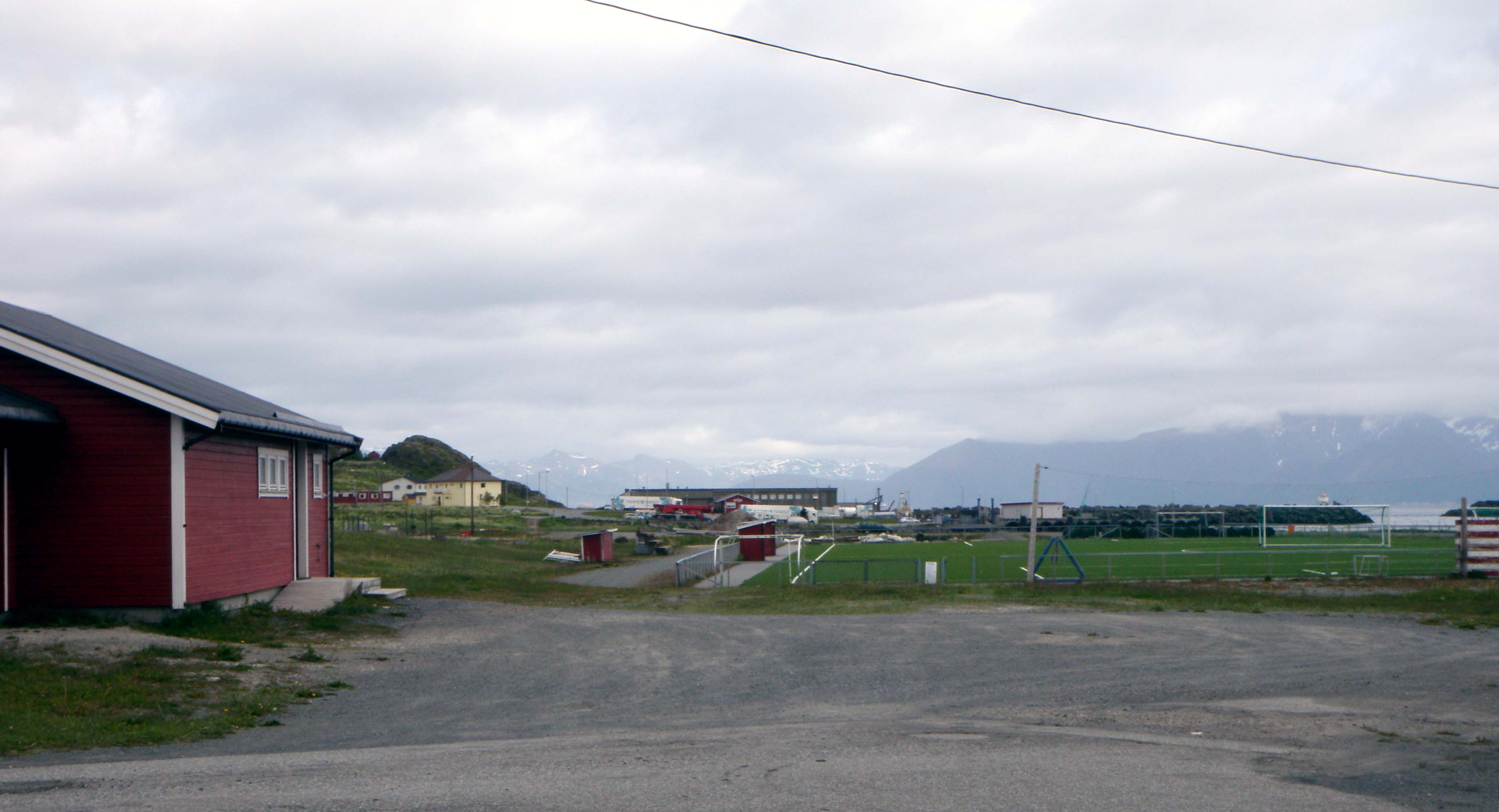
Hasvik stadion

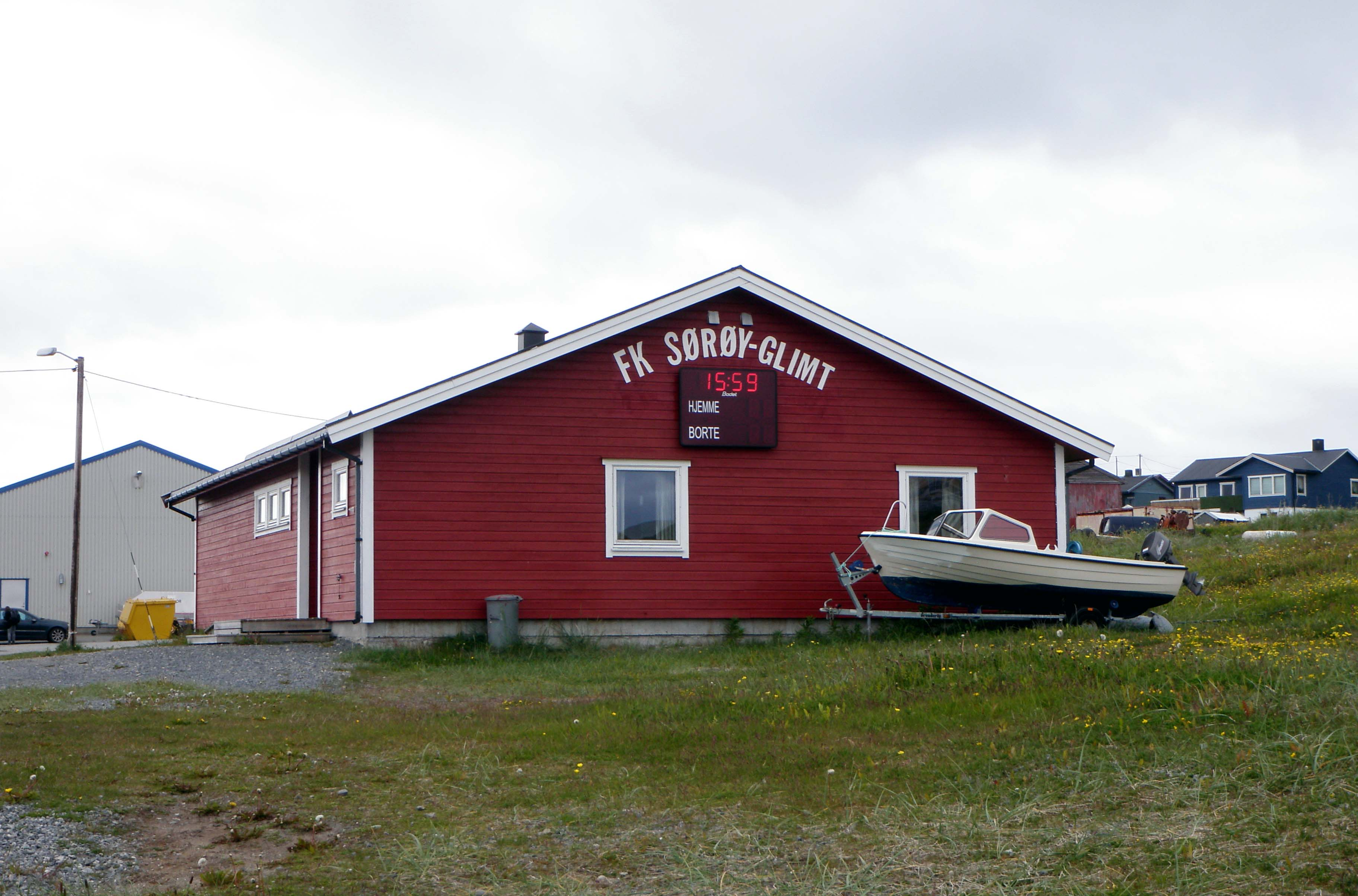
FK Sørøy Glimt's clubroom in Hasvik

Fotballklubben Sørøy Glimt is a Norwegian association football club from Hasvik Municipality in Finnmark county. The result of a merger between clubs in a tiny municipality, it was still a mainstay in the Third Division between 1995 and 2010. The club is based in the village of Hasvik.

== Organization and history ==
It was founded on 6 November 1987 as a merger between Breivikbotn IL and the football section of Hasvik IL. It recruits mainly from the villages Hasvik and Breivikbotn. With only 934 inhabitants, Hasvik was the smallest municipality in Norway to have a Third Division football team.

The club colors are red and white, and the club motto is "Unity Gives Strength" (Norwegian: Samhold gir styrke).

The men's football team has experienced three runs in the Third Division, the fourth tier of Norwegian football. Its longest run began in 2004. The team finished seventh in 2004, ninth in 2005, sixth in 2006, fourth in 2007, fifth in 2008 and third in 2009. Before that they played the 2002 and 2003 seasons in the Fourth Division, and in the Third Division from 1995 to 2001.

Following the 2010 season the team was relegated again, and languished for three seasons in the lower leagues before reappearing in 2014. Relegated after one season, in 2015 Sørøy Glimt finished fourth in the Fourth Division.

The best known player on the team is Aslak Salkjelsvik, who joined Sørøy Glimt in 2007. In the 1990s he played second-tier football for Harstad IL.

In 2004 the club was rocked by a doping case. People in the club suspected that some of the men's team players indulged in unorganized doping. The club sent a tip to Anti-Doping Norway, and controllers arrived on 9 September. Three players were found to have positive doping tests. The three players admitted the substance abuse. Doping case in Northern Norwegian football are very rare; according to an interview in Nordlys this was probably the first.
