= Breivik, Finnmark =

Village in Hasvik, Norway

Breivik
- Village
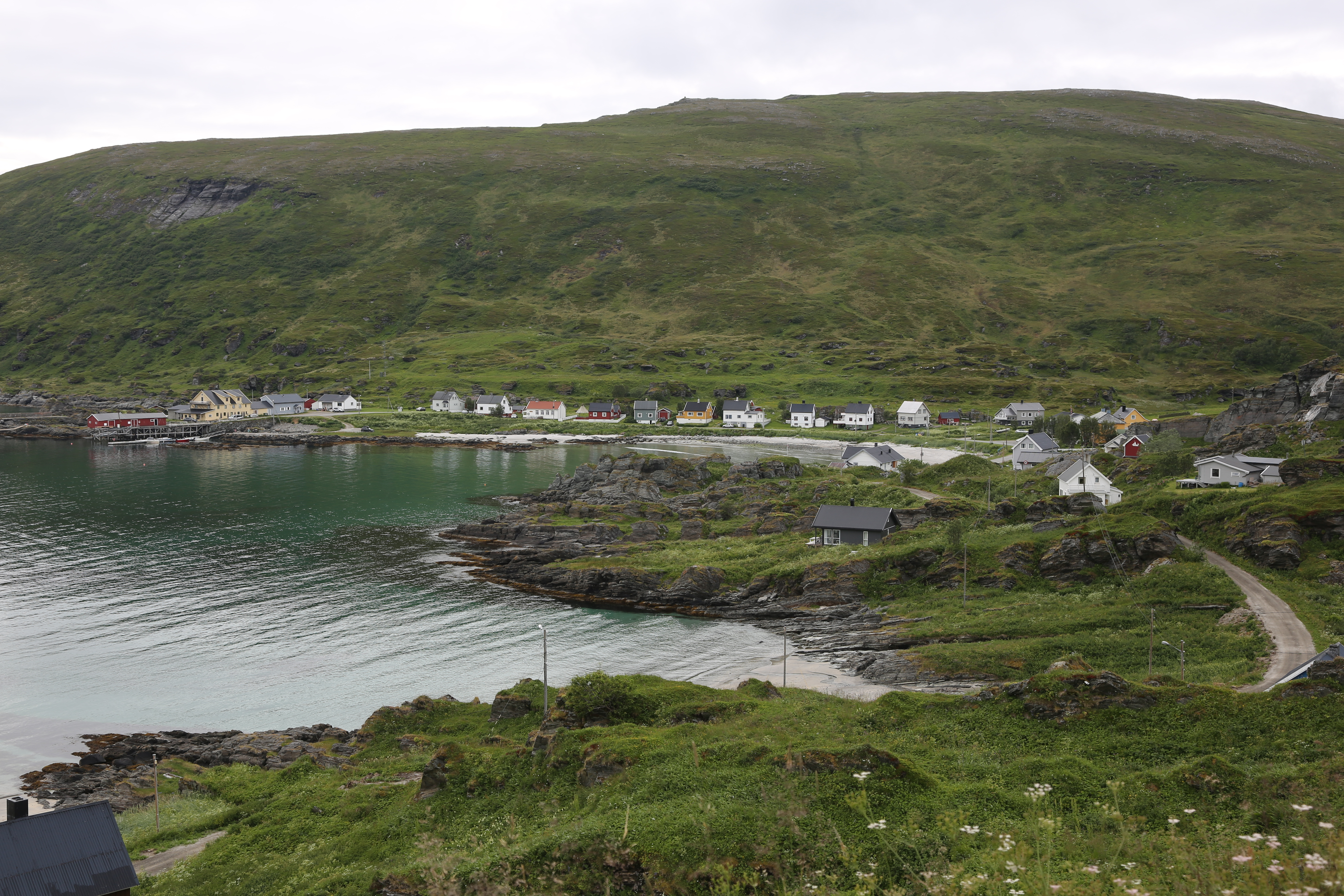
- Interactive map of Breivik
- Location within Finnmark Location within Norway
- Coordinates: 70°35′55″N 22°06′29″E
- Country: Norway
- Region: Northern Norway
- County: Finnmark
- District: Vest-Finnmark
- Municipality: Hasvik Municipality
- Elevation: 5 m (16 ft)
- Time zone: UTC+01:00 (CET)
  - Summer (DST): UTC+02:00 (CEST)
- Post Code: 9595 Sørvær

Breivik (lit. 'broad cove') is a small fishing village in Hasvik Municipality in Finnmark county, Norway. It is located about half-way in between the villages of Sørvær and Breivikbotn on the western end of the island of Sørøya, looking out into the Lopphavet Sea. It is located along Norwegian County Road 882.
