= Sørfjorden (Hasvik) =

Fjord in Hasvik, Norway

Sørfjorden (Norwegian); Meahkovuotna (Northern Sami)
- Interactive map of the fjord
- Location: Finnmark county, Norway
- Coordinates: 70°20′36″N 22°27′49″E
- Type: Fjord
- Primary outflows: Sørøysundet strait
- Basin countries: Norway
- Max. length: 4.5 kilometres (2.8 mi)
- Max. width: 1.3 kilometres (0.81 mi)

Sørfjorden (Norwegian) or Meahkovuotna (Northern Sami) is a fjord on the island of Stjernøya in Hasvik Municipality in Finnmark county, Norway. The 4.5-kilometre (2.8 mi) long fjord begins between Roren in the west and Nordnes in the east. The fjord goes directly southeast to the Nerdalen valley at the end of the fjord. Sørfjorden is the westernmost of the fjords on Stjernøya. There are several isolated farms along the fjord. The fjord flows out into the Sørøysundet strait.
