= Komagaksla =

Mountain on the island of Sørøya in Norway

- Location of the mountain

Highest point
- Elevation: 659 m (2,162 ft)
- Prominence: 659 m (2,162 ft)
- Coordinates: 70.5407°N 22.8816°E

Geography
- Location: Finnmark, Norway
- Topo map(s): 1836 III Sørøya and 1836 II Sørøysundet

Komagaksla (or Vatnafjellet) is the highest mountain on the island of Sørøya in Hammerfest Municipality in Finnmark county, Norway. The 659-metre (2,162 ft) tall mountain sits along the southern shore of the island, along the Sørøysundet.
