= Sørvær Chapel =

- Sørvær kapell
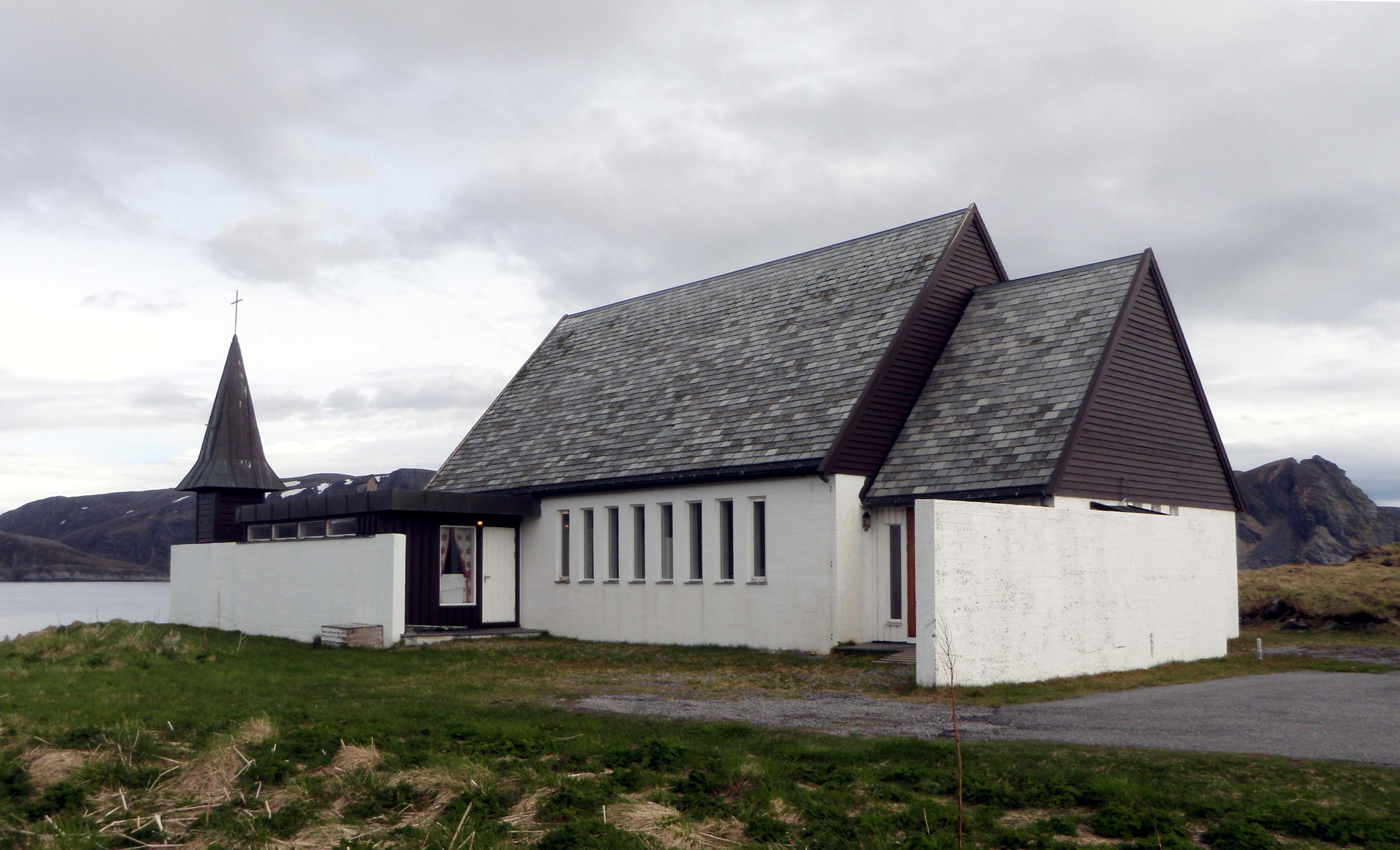
- View of the chapel
- Sørvær Chapel
- 70.6280277°N 21.981766°E
- Location: Hasvik Municipality, Finnmark
- Country: Norway
- Denomination: Church of Norway
- Churchmanship: Evangelical Lutheran

History
- Status: Chapel
- Founded: 1968
- Consecrated: 1968

Architecture
- Functional status: Active
- Architect: Sverre Flåto
- Architectural type: Long church
- Completed: 1968 (58 years ago)

Specifications
- Capacity: 108
- Materials: Stone and wood

Administration
- Diocese: Nord-Hålogaland
- Deanery: Alta prosti
- Parish: Hasvik
- Norwegian Cultural Heritage Site
- Type: Church
- Status: Not protected
- ID: 88063

Sørvær Chapel (Norwegian: Sørvær kapell) is a chapel of the Church of Norway in Hasvik Municipality in Finnmark county, Norway. It is located in the village of Sørvær on the western tip of the island of Sørøya. It is an annex chapel for the Hasvik parish which is part of the Alta prosti (deanery) in the Diocese of Nord-Hålogaland. The white chapel, made of stone and wood, was built in a long church style in 1968 using plans drawn up by the architect Sverre Flåto. The church seats about 100 people.

== History ==
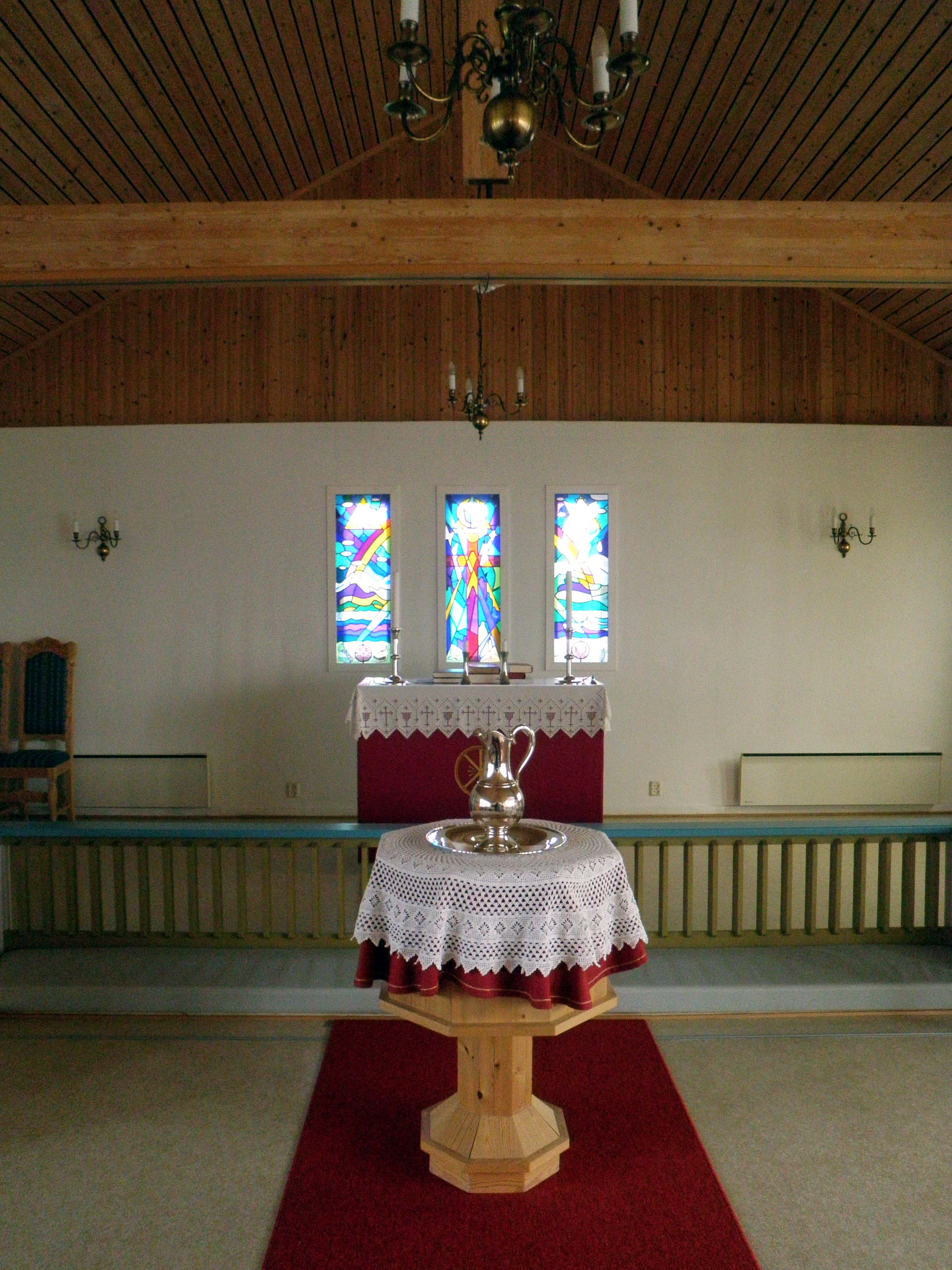
Interior of the chapel, facing the altar

The earliest existing historical records of the church date back to the year 1589, but the church was likely built much earlier. By 1697, the old church was quite dilapidated and so it was torn down and not replaced. After more than 250 years, a new chapel was built on the same site. The chapel was completed in 1968.

== See also ==
- List of churches in Nord-Hålogaland
