= Breivikbotn Chapel =

Church in Finnmark, Norway

- Breivikbotn kapell
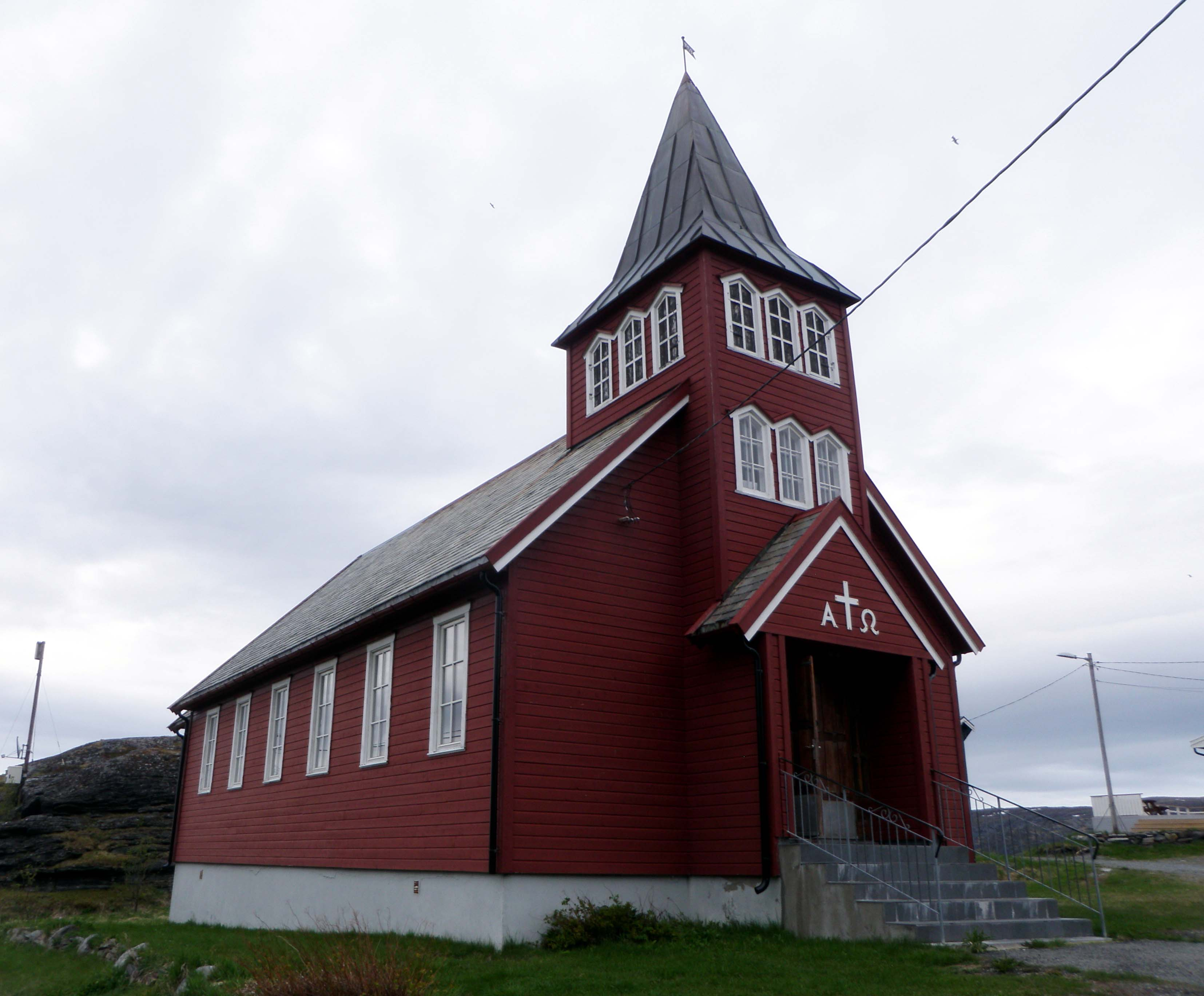
- View of the chapel
- Breivikbotn Chapel
- 70.589095°N 22.293424°E
- Location: Hasvik Municipality, Finnmark
- Country: Norway
- Denomination: Church of Norway
- Churchmanship: Evangelical Lutheran

History
- Status: Chapel
- Founded: 1959
- Consecrated: 1959

Architecture
- Functional status: Active
- Architect: Rolf Harlew Jenssen
- Architectural type: Long church
- Completed: 1959 (67 years ago)

Specifications
- Capacity: 90
- Materials: Wood

Administration
- Diocese: Nord-Hålogaland
- Deanery: Alta prosti
- Parish: Hasvik
- Norwegian Cultural Heritage Site
- Type: Church
- Status: Not protected
- ID: 83948

Breivikbotn Chapel (Norwegian: Breivikbotn kapell) is a chapel of the Church of Norway in Hasvik Municipality in Finnmark county, Norway. It is located in the village of Breivikbotn on the west coast of the island of Sørøya. It is an annex chapel for the Hasvik parish which is part of the Alta prosti (deanery) in the Diocese of Nord-Hålogaland. The red, wooden church was built in a long church style in 1959 using plans drawn up by the architect Rolf Harlew Jenssen. The church seats about 90 people.

== See also ==
- List of churches in Nord-Hålogaland
