= Glimt =

Glimt may refer to:

- FK Bodø/Glimt, a football club from Bodø, Norway
- FK Sørøy Glimt, a football club from Hasvik, Finnmark, Norway
- HNoMS Glimt (P962), a vessel built for the Royal Norwegian Navy
