= Sørvær =

Sørvær may refer to the following locations:

- Sørvær, Finnmark, a village in Hasvik municipality, Finnmark county, Norway
- Sørvær, Nordland, a fishing village and island in Bodø municipality, Nordland county, Norway
- Sørvær, Vega, a small island in Vega municipality, Nordland county, Norway
- Sørvær, Gildeskål, a small island in the Fleinvær group in Gildeskål municipality, Nordland county, Norway
