= Dønnesfjord Church =

- Dønnesfjord kirke
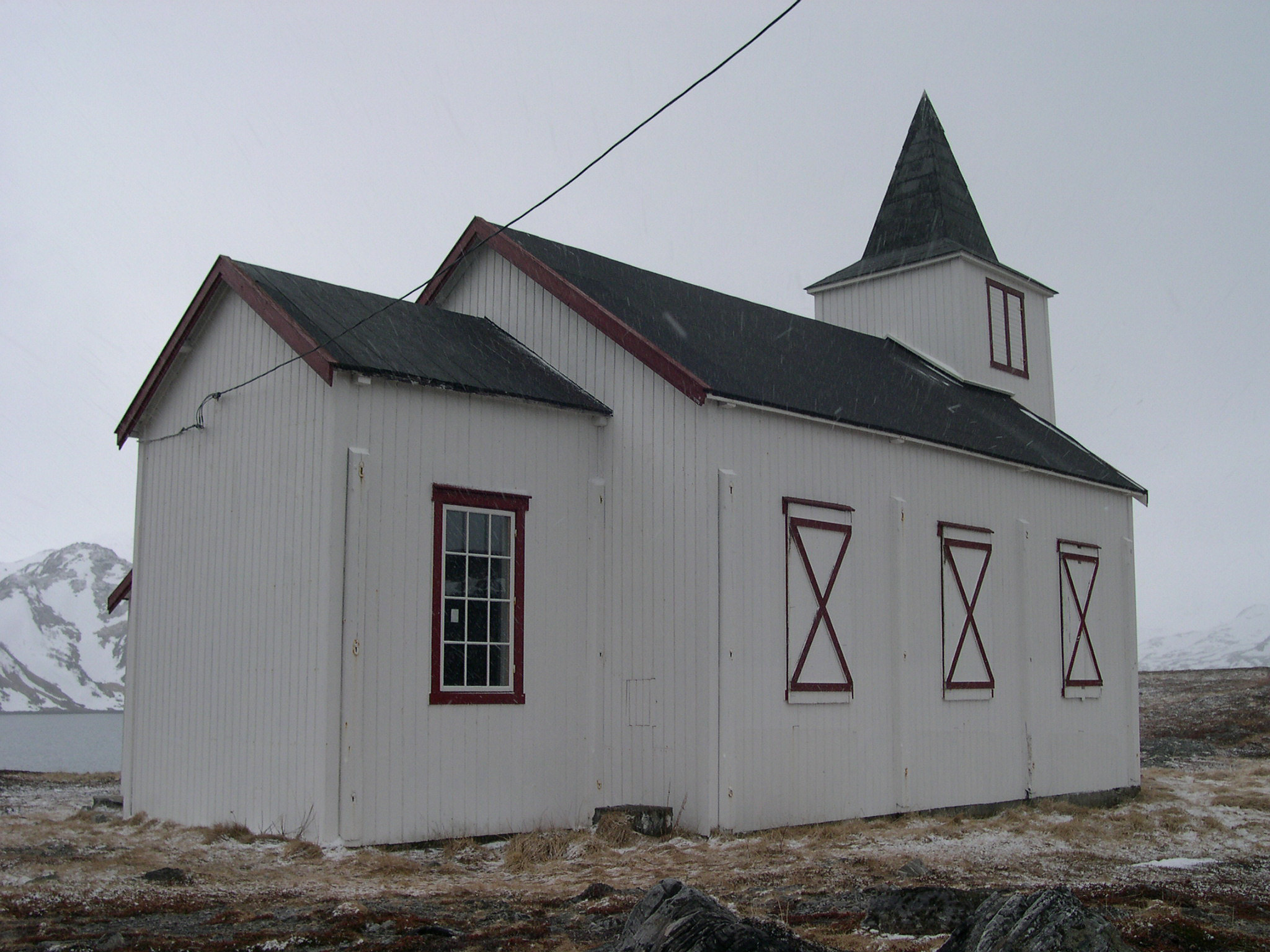
- View of the church
- Dønnesfjord Church
- 70.649788°N 22.6227607°E
- Location: Hasvik Municipality, Finnmark
- Country: Norway
- Denomination: Church of Norway
- Churchmanship: Evangelical Lutheran

History
- Status: Parish church
- Founded: 1888
- Consecrated: 1952

Architecture
- Functional status: Inactive
- Architect: Jacob Wilhelm Nordan
- Architectural type: Long church
- Completed: 1952 (74 years ago)
- Closed: 2003

Specifications
- Capacity: 120
- Materials: Wood

Administration
- Diocese: Nord-Hålogaland
- Deanery: Alta prosti
- Parish: Hasvik
- Norwegian Cultural Heritage Site
- Type: Church
- Status: Protected
- ID: 84046

Dønnesfjord Church (Norwegian: Dønnesfjord kirke) is a former parish church of the Church of Norway in Hasvik Municipality in Finnmark county, Norway. It is located in the village of Dønnesfjord on the island of Sørøya. It was one of the churches for the Hasvik parish which is part of the Alta prosti (deanery) in the Diocese of Nord-Hålogaland. The white, wooden church was built on this site in 1952 and it was closed in 2003. The church seats about 120 people.

== History ==
On 15 December 1885, a royal decree gave permission to build a church in the fishing village of Galten, on the shores of the Galtenfjorden to serve all the fisherman and whalers living on this part of the island of Sørøya. The architect Jacob Wilhelm Nordan was the designer of the building that was completed in 1888. The consecration of the church was scheduled to be on 24 August 1888, and all the local residents gathered at the new church, but due to bad weather and high seas, the clergy members who were to perform the consecration were not able to make it. The villagers had to go home and the consecration took place on 28 August instead. In 1944, when the German occupation of Norway was ending and the German army was burning all the villages in Norway, the entire village of Galten was burned. This church, however, survived because the fire in this church went out shortly after it was set.

After World War II, it was decided to not rebuild the village of Galten since it was in a very isolated location, only accessible by boat. The church was then moved to the nearby village of Dønnesfjord, across the fjord. The rebuilt church was reopened in 1952. Over time, the village of Dønnesfjord depopulated to the point where no one lived there anymore and in 2003, the church was closed and regular services were no longer held there. Since then, one service is held each summer in addition to special occasions such as weddings. In 2004, the parish wanted to give away the church to someone who could take it down and reuse the materials, but the Riksantikvaren board officially designated the church as a preserved cultural site, so with this protection, the church has to remain standing. The church was renovated in 2005 for a cost of 350,000 kr that was jointly financed by the Riksantikvaren, the county, and the parish.

== See also ==
- List of churches in Nord-Hålogaland
