= Breivikbotn =

Village in Hasvik, Norway

- Village
- Interactive map of Breivikbotn
- Location within Finnmark Location within Norway
- Coordinates: 70°35′19″N 22°17′05″E
- Country: Norway
- Region: Northern Norway
- County: Finnmark
- District: Vest-Finnmark
- Municipality: Hasvik Municipality

Area
  - Total: 0.33 km^{2} (0.13 sq mi)
- Elevation: 5 m (16 ft)

Population (2023)
  - Total: 308
  - Density: 933/km^{2} (2,420/sq mi)
- Time zone: UTC+01:00 (CET)
  - Summer (DST): UTC+02:00 (CEST)
- Post Code: 9593 Breivikbotn

Breivikbotn is the administrative centre of Hasvik Municipality in Finnmark county, Norway. It is an old trading post and fishing village that is located on the western end of the island of Sørøya, looking out across the Lopphavet Sea. The village lies along Norwegian County Road 822 in the central part of the municipality. The village of Hasvik lies about 15 kilometres (9.3 mi) to the south, the former village of Dønnesfjord lies about 13 kilometres (8.1 mi) to the northeast, and the village of Sørvær lies about 20 kilometres (12 mi) to the west.

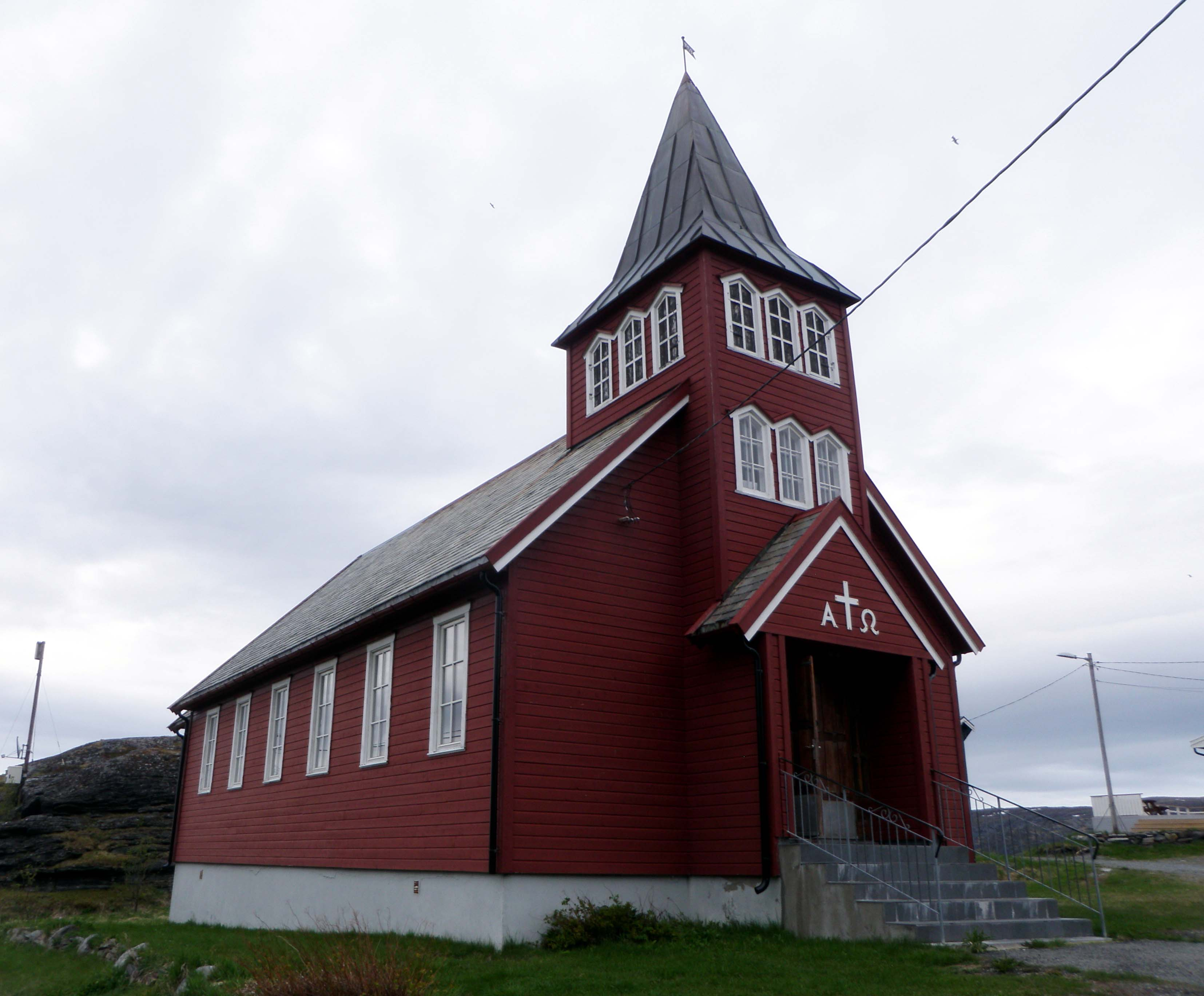
View of the local Breivikbotn Chapel

The 0.33-square-kilometre (82-acre) village has a population (2023) of 308 and a population density of 933 inhabitants per square kilometre (2,420/sq mi). Breivikbotn Chapel is located in this village as well as much of the commercial activity in the municipality.
