= Sørvær, Finnmark =

Village in Hasvik, Norway

Sørvær
- Village
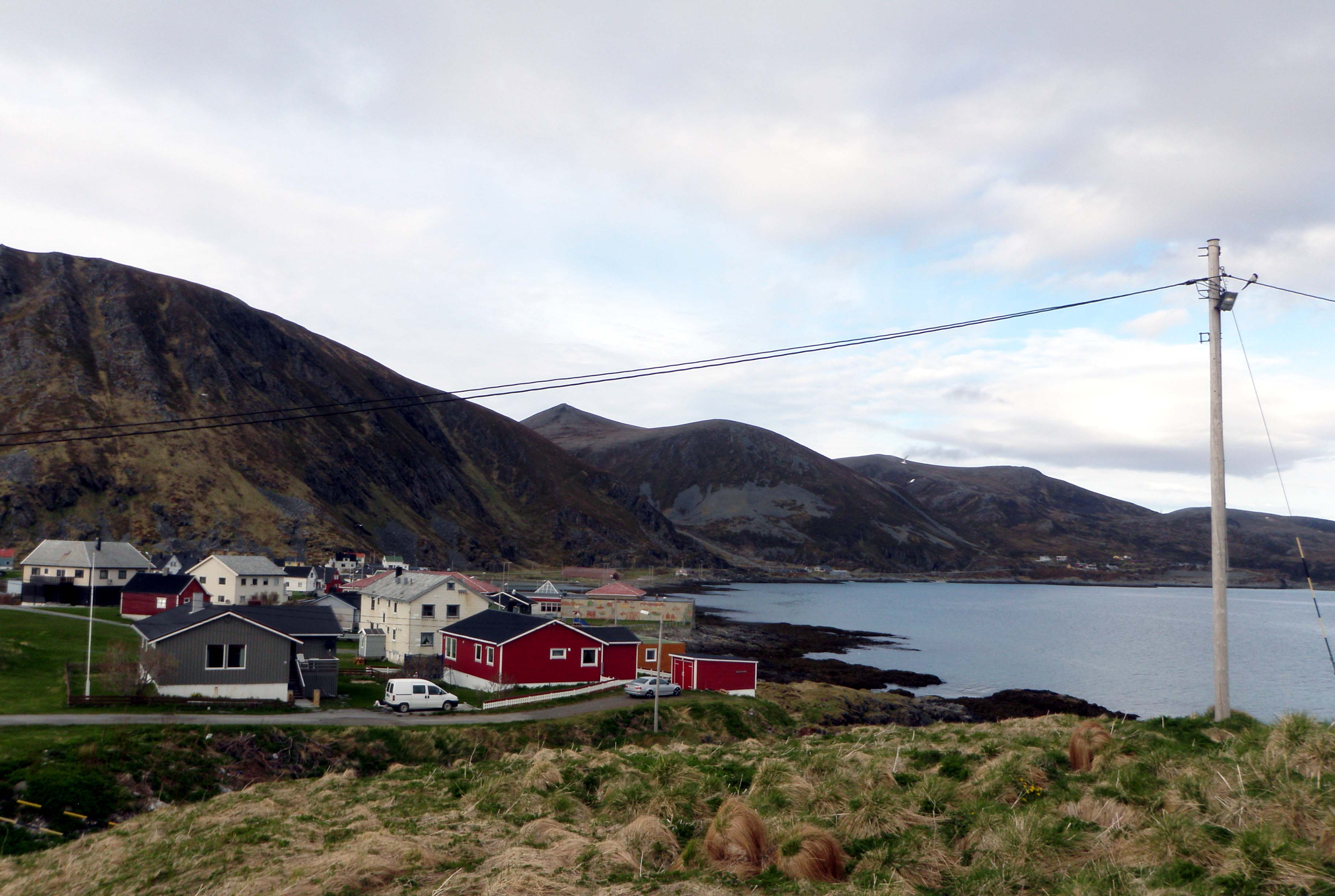
- View of the village
- Interactive map of Sørvær
- Location within Finnmark Location within Norway
- Coordinates: 70°37′49″N 21°59′04″E
- Country: Norway
- Region: Northern Norway
- County: Finnmark
- District: Vest-Finnmark
- Municipality: Hasvik Municipality

Area
  - Total: 0.16 km^{2} (0.062 sq mi)
- Elevation: 4 m (13 ft)

Population (2015)
  - Total: 200
- Time zone: UTC+01:00 (CET)
  - Summer (DST): UTC+02:00 (CEST)
- Post Code: 9595 Sørvær

Sørvær is a fishing village in Hasvik Municipality in Finnmark county, Norway. The village is located on the western tip of the island of Sørøya, looking out across the Lopphavet Sea. Sørvær Chapel is located in this village. The village sits at the northern end of Norwegian County Road 822, about 20 kilometres (12 mi) west of the municipal centre of Breivikbotn. The small village of Breivik lies about halfway along the road to Breivikbotn.

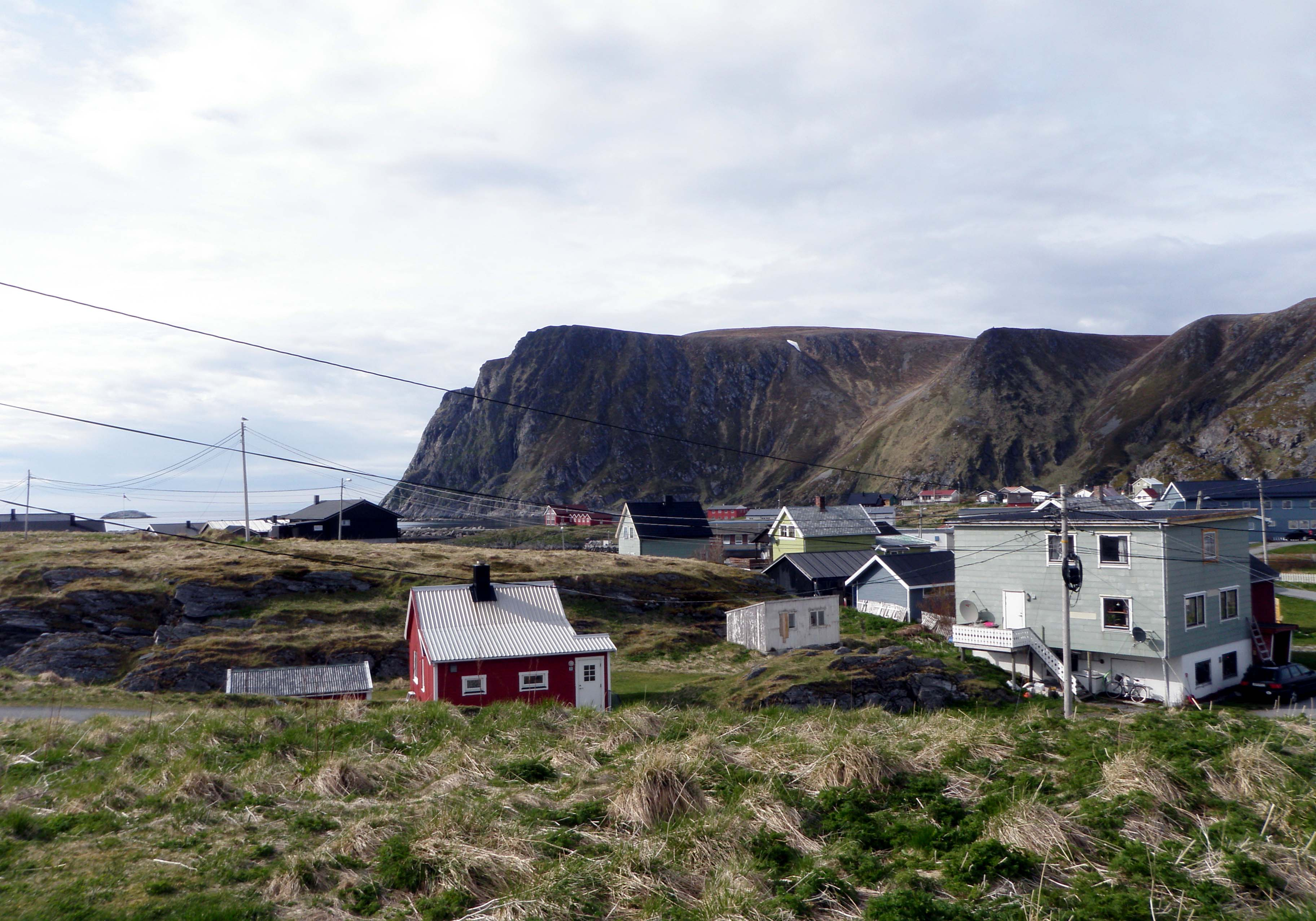
Western end of the village

The 0.16-square-kilometre (40-acre) village had a population (2005) of 201 and a population density of 1,256 inhabitants per square kilometre (3,250/sq mi). Since 2005, the population and area data for this village area has not been separately tracked by Statistics Norway. In 2015, the population was about 200 people.

In 1994 the Soviet cruiser Murmansk (1955), en route to India for ship breaking, ran aground near the coast of Sørvær when its tow line broke. The removal of the ship was completed in 2013.
