= Stjernsundet =

Strait in Finnmark county, Norway

Coordinates: 70.23°N 22.68°E

Stjernsundet is a strait in Finnmark, Norway. It separates the island of Stjernøya from the mainland. Stjernsundet leads from the outer part of Altafjorden, and opens up westwards into Lopphavet. During the World War II Operation Source, a number of British X-crafts found their way from Lopphavet through Stjernsundet and succeeded in attacking and damaging the German battleship Tirpitz in Kåfjorden, an inner branch of Altafjorden.
