= Dønnesfjord =

Abandoned village in Hasvik, Norway

- Village
- Interactive map of Dønnesfjord
- Location within Finnmark Location within Norway
- Coordinates: 70°38′55″N 22°37′46″E
- Country: Norway
- Region: Northern Norway
- County: Finnmark
- District: Vest-Finnmark
- Municipality: Hasvik Municipality
- Elevation: 0.5 m (1.6 ft)
- Time zone: UTC+01:00 (CET)
  - Summer (DST): UTC+02:00 (CEST)
- Post Code: 9593 Breivikbotn

Dønnesfjord is an abandoned fishing village in Hasvik Municipality in Finnmark county, Norway. The site of the former village is located on the small island of Nordøya in the Dønnesfjorden on the north central coast of the large island of Sørøya. There are no roads that connect to the isolated village, so access is limited to boats. There are a few buildings remaining in Dønnesfjord, including Dønnesfjord Church, but there are no more permanent residents. Some homes are used as summer cabins for vacations, and the church is occasionally used for special services and weddings.
