= Hasvik Airport =

Airport in Hasvik, Norway

Hasvik Airport Hasvik lufthavn

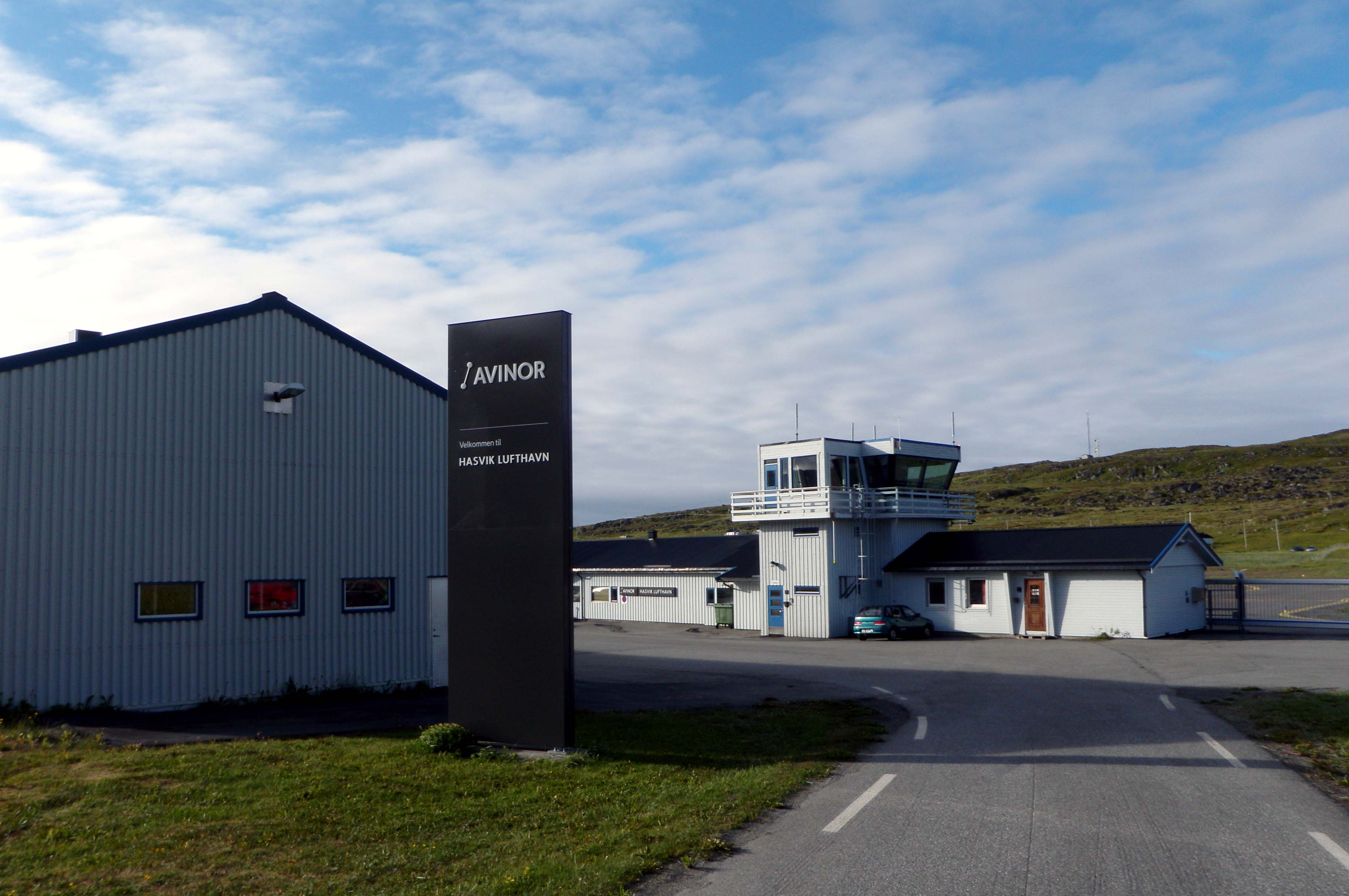
- IATA: HAA; ICAO: ENHK

Summary
- Airport type: Public
- Owner: Avinor
- Serves: Hasvik
- Location: Hasvik, Finnmark, Norway
- Elevation AMSL: 7 m / 23 ft
- Coordinates: 70°29′12″N 022°08′23″E
- Website: avinor.no

Map

Runways
Direction	Length		Surface
Direction	m	ft	Surface
11/29	909	2,982	Asphalt

Statistics (2014)
- Passengers: 7,629
- Aircraft movements: 1,272
- Cargo (tonnes): 0.2

Hasvik Airport (Norwegian: Hasvik lufthavn; IATA: HAA, ICAO: ENHK) is a regional airport serving Hasvik Municipality in Finnmark county, Norway. The airport is located in the village of Hasvik on the island of Sørøya. In 2012, Hasvik Airport had 7,629 passengers, making it the third-least busy airport operated by the state-owned Avinor. The airport consists of a 909-meter (2,982 ft) runway and is served by Widerøe with Dash 8-100 aircraft. The airport tower is operated remotely from Bodø.

Planning started in 1972 for an airport to serve air taxi and air ambulance services. The original 421-meter (1,381 ft) gravel runway opened on 17 May 1973, allowing Norving to operate flights with their Britten-Norman Islanders. The airport was upgraded with a longer runway and a larger terminal in 1983, allowing Norving to start scheduled services to Alta and Hammerfest. Widerøe took over the routes in 1990, at first using the de Havilland Canada Twin Otter. The runway was asphalted in 1995, allowing Widerøe to introduce the Dash 8. The airport was nationalized two years later.

== History ==
The first aircraft in Hasvik was an emergency landing carried out en route to Svalbard in the early 1970s. The plain where the aircraft landed, located near the village, became the site of the airport. The regional airline Norving took the initiative in 1972 to construct a simple airfield at Hasvik; they hoped to finance the project along with the municipality, the National Insurance Administration and the local chapter of the Norwegian Red Cross Search and Rescue Corps. In addition to being able to operate an air taxi service and land air ambulances, locals hoped that the construction would be a first step to becoming part of the state-financed construction of regional airports in Finnmark. However, Hasvik was not selected as one of the original regional airports.

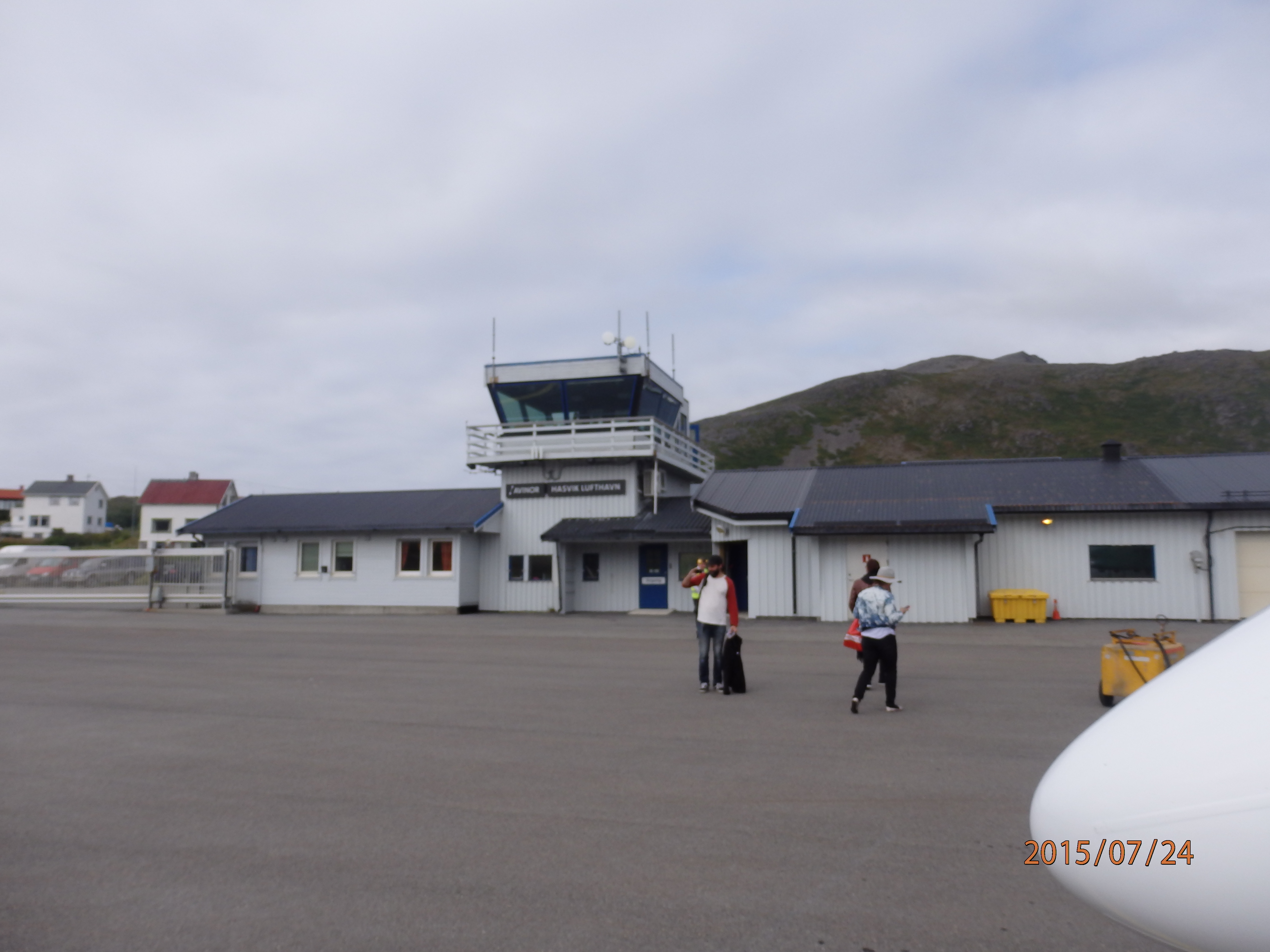
Passengers disembarking aircraft at Hasvik Airport

The initial airport consisted of a 421-meter (1,381 ft) gravel runway and a spartan terminal consisting of no more than a shack. The airport opened on 17 May 1973 and Norving started an air taxi service using the eight-passenger Britten-Norman Islander. Grants of 3.5 million Norwegian krone (NOK) were issued from the state in 1981, which was supplemented with funding from Norving, the National Insurance Administration, Kommunalbanken and local interests. The new facilities opened in early 1983, consisting of a larger terminal and control tower and a lengthening of the runway—although it retained the gravel surface. The upgrades cost NOK 5.8 million; they allowed Norving to operate a daily scheduled taxi route to Hammerfest and Alta, and for the first time Hasvik was able to receive same-day newspapers. The flights corresponded with Scandinavian Airlines System's Oslo-flights at Alta Airport.

Norving operated at the airport until 1990, when the route was taken over by Widerøe, who initially used the de Havilland Canada Twin Otter. The Ministry of Transport and Communications announced in February 1993 that they were considering taking over ownership and operations of the airport through the Civil Aviation Administration (CAA, later renamed Avinor). Along with Båtsfjord Airport and Vardø Airport, Svartnes, Hasvik Airport was one of three regional airports in Finnmark with government-subsidized routes which did not receive state operating grants. In December Widerøe articulated that Hasvik Airport did not meet the demands for future operation as it lacked proper instruments and did not have an asphalt runway. Widerøe stated that with the introduction of the Dash 8 they would no longer be able to serve the airport. Additional navigation aids were installed in 1993 and the runway was asphalted in 1995, subsequently resulting in Dash 8 services being introduced. The state and the Civil Aviation Administration took over ownership and operations of the airport from 1 January 1997. The runway lights were upgraded in 2008 and 2009, followed by the installation of the Global Positioning System-based landing system SCAT-I.

Avinor wants to extend most short airports to 1,200 metres (3,900 ft) by year 2030, because they see a lack of aircraft types which have more than 19 seats able to use 800-metre (2,600 ft) runways. Dash 8 built after 2009 cannot use them. Few countries apart from Norway have such short airports. There is however no room for this at Hasvik, so the plan here and for some other airports with few passengers, is to use small planes with less than 20 seats. Land reclamation in order to expand the airfield could be considered, however it is economically unviable.

== Facilities ==
Hasvik Airport has a simple terminal building with a capacity for 20 passengers per hour. It has a 909-by-30-meter (2,982 by 98 ft) asphalt runway aligned 11/29. The tarmac has a place for one airliner. There is a harbor southeast of the runway which limits any expansion. The airport is located two minutes drive from the village center; free parking is available.

== Airlines and destinations ==
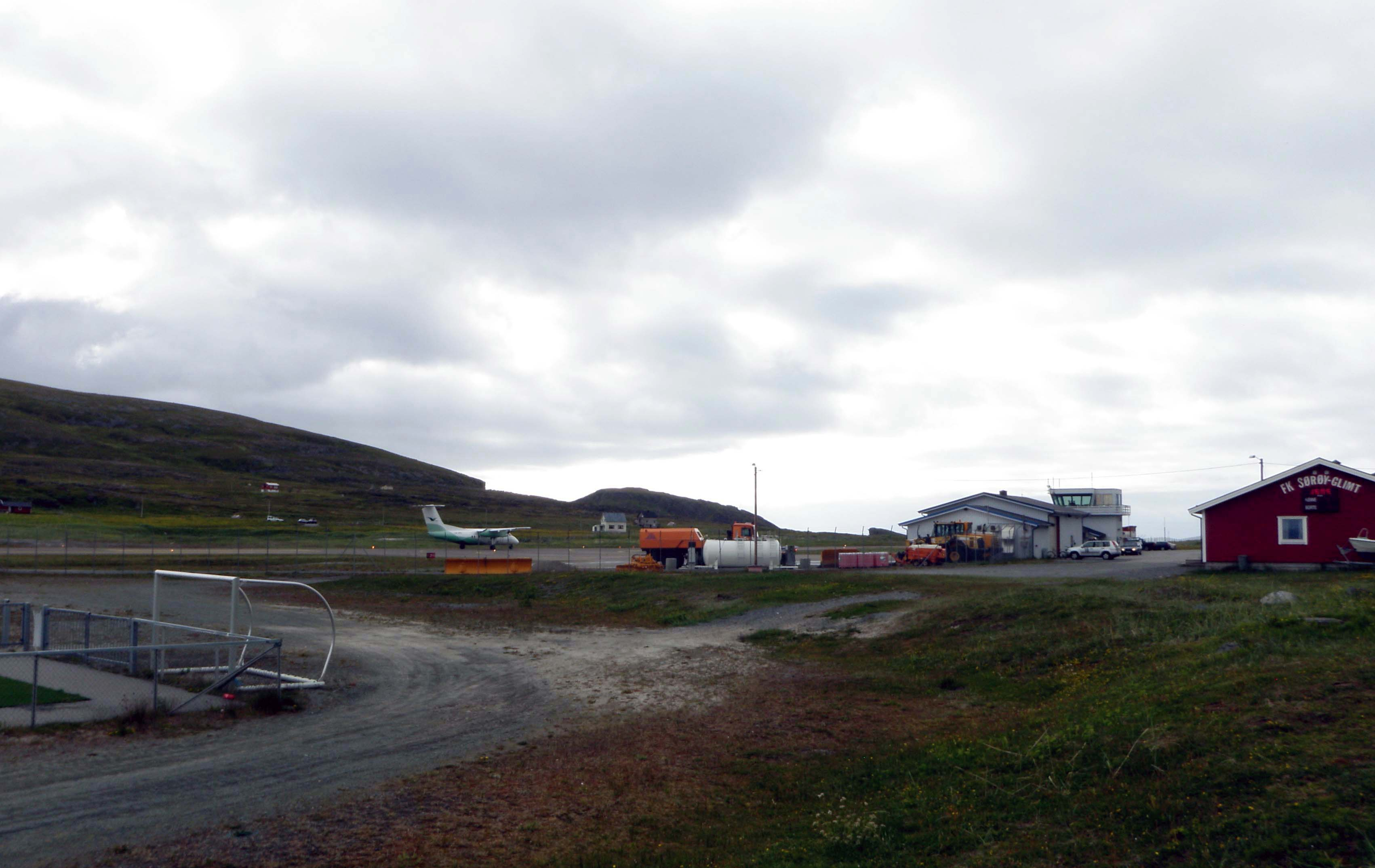
View of Hasvik Airport, with Widerøe Dash 8-100 aircraft on take-off roll

The airport is served by Widerøe, who operates flights based on a public service obligation contract with the Ministry of Transport and Communications. All flights are operated using 39-seat Dash 8-100 aircraft. Flights are flown to Tromsø and Hammerfest and can continue to other villages and towns in Finnmark. In 2014 the airport served 7,629 passengers, 1,272 aircraft movements and handled 0.2 tonnes of cargo. Hasvik is the third-least busy airport operated by Avinor, ahead of Berlevåg Airport and Fagernes Airport, Leirin.

Airlines	Destinations
Widerøe	Hammerfest, Tromsø

== Statistics ==
Annual passenger traffic
Year	Passengers	% Change
2025	18,555	▲6.7%
2024	17,385	▼ -38.9%
2023	28,450	▲0.2%
2022	28,393	▲15.0%
2021	24,697	▲22.2%
2020	20,210	▼ -24.0%
2019	26,584	▲2.9%
2018	25,846	▲14.3%
2017	22,607	▲56.1%
2016	14,484	▲1.9%
2015	14,217	

== Bibliography ==
- Melling, Kjersti (2009). Nordavind fra alle kanter (in Norwegian). Oslo: Pilotforlaget.
