= Sørøysundet =

Strait in Finnmark county, Norway

- Interactive map of the strait
- Location: Finnmark county, Norway
- Coordinates: 70.4441°N 22.5032°E
- Type: Strait
- Basin countries: Norway
- Max. length: 70 kilometres (43 mi)

Sørøysundet is a strait in Hasvik Municipality and Hammerfest Municipality in Finnmark county, Norway. The 70-kilometre (43 mi) strait is between 4 and 17 kilometres (2.5 and 10.6 mi) wide. The strait separates the large island of Sørøya from the islands of Stjernøya, Seiland, and Kvaløya. To the southwest the strait opens up into Lopphavet sea. The small island of Håja lies in the strait, about 9 kilometres (5.6 mi) west of the town of Hammerfest. There are no bridges or tunnels that cross the strait, but there are ferry routes crossing it.
