= Stjernøya =

Island in Finnmark county, Norway

Stjernøya (Norwegian); Stierdná (Northern Sami)
- Interactive map of: Stjernøya (Norwegian); Stierdná (Northern Sami)

Geography
- Location: Finnmark, Norway
- Coordinates: 70.31°N 22.66°E
- Area: 248.1 km^{2} (95.8 sq mi)
- Length: 27 km (16.8 mi)
- Width: 16 km (9.9 mi)
- Highest elevation: 960 m (3150 ft)
- Highest point: Kjerringfjordfjellet

Administration
- Norway
- County: Finnmark
- Municipalities: Alta, Hasvik, Loppa

Demographics
- Population: 45 (2026)
- Pop. density: 0.32/km^{2} (0.83/sq mi)

Stjernøya (Norwegian) or Stierdná (Northern Sami) is an island in western Finnmark county, Norway. The 248.1-square-kilometre (95.8 sq mi) island sits at the mouth of the Altafjorden on the south side of the Sørøysundet strait. It is divided among the municipalities of Loppa, Hasvik, and Alta.

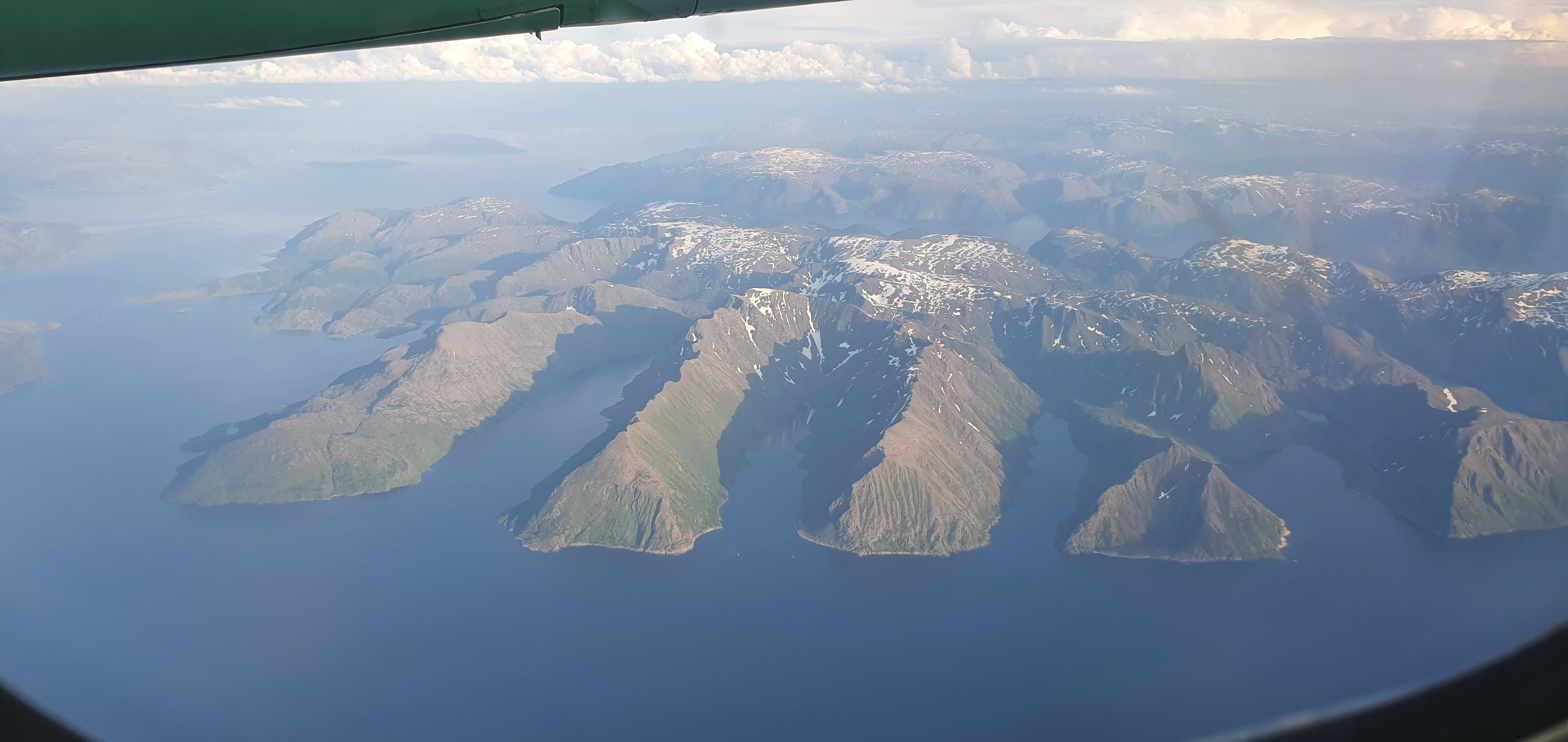
Stjnernøya from an airplane view.

The highest point on the island is the 960-metre (3,150 ft) tall mountain Kjerringfjordfjellet. One of the larger fjords on the island is the Sørfjorden. There were 80 residents on the mountainous island in 2012. The main population area is at the village of Store Kvalfjord on the northeastern side of the island. The island is separated from the mainland by the strait of Stjernsundet.

On the southern part of the island there is a large nepheline syenite mine at Lillebukt.

== See also ==
- List of islands of Norway
