= Hasvik Church =

- Hasvik kirke
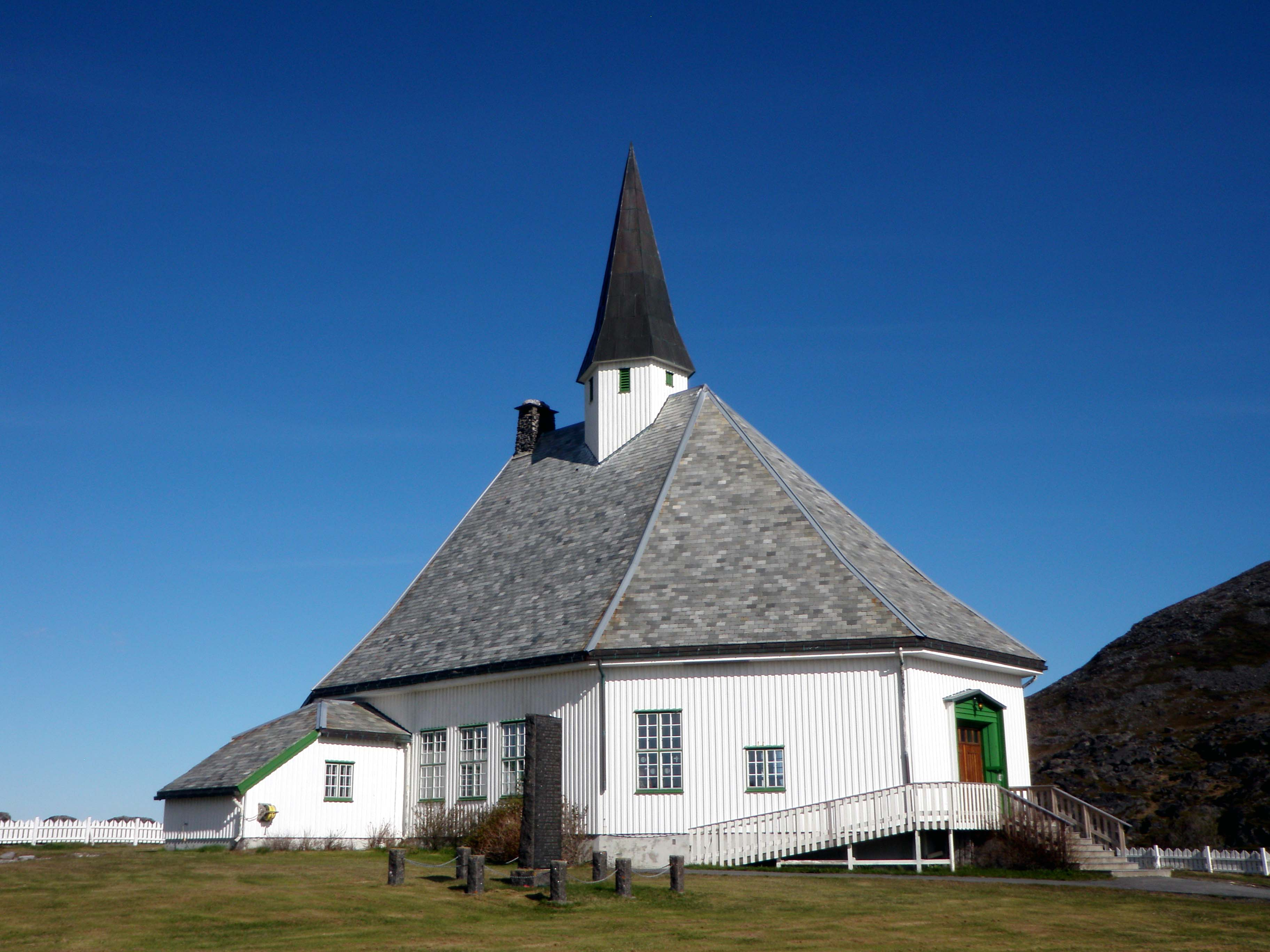
- View of the church
- Hasvik Church
- 70.488545°N 22.154859°E
- Location: Hasvik Municipality, Finnmark
- Country: Norway
- Denomination: Church of Norway
- Churchmanship: Evangelical Lutheran

History
- Former name: Hasvaag kirke
- Status: Parish church
- Founded: 15th century
- Consecrated: 17 July 1955

Architecture
- Functional status: Active
- Architect: Valdemar Scheel Hansteen
- Architectural type: Octagonal
- Completed: 1955 (71 years ago)

Specifications
- Capacity: 220
- Materials: Wood

Administration
- Diocese: Nord-Hålogaland
- Deanery: Alta prosti
- Parish: Hasvik
- Norwegian Cultural Heritage Site
- Type: Church
- Status: Not protected
- ID: 84492

Hasvik Church (Norwegian: Hasvik kirke) is a parish church of the Church of Norway in Hasvik Municipality in Finnmark county, Norway. It is located in the village of Hasvik. It is the church for the Hasvik parish which is part of the Alta prosti (deanery) in the Diocese of Nord-Hålogaland. The white, wooden church was built in an octagonal style in 1955 using plans drawn up by the architect Valdemar Scheel Hansteen. The church seats about 220 people.

== History ==
The earliest existing historical records of the church date back to the year 1589, but the church was not new that year. The original church stood in Hasvåg, about 1.5 kilometres (0.93 mi) north of the present site of the church. In 1690, the old church was in poor condition so repairs were undertaken, however, two years later in 1692, the old church was torn down and replaced with a new church on the same site. The new church was a rectangular timber-framed building. The new church building quickly fell into disrepair. In 1712, materials were procured for a new church building, but it was decided to move the church site about 1.5 kilometres (0.93 mi) to the south to Hasvik.

In 1814, this church served as an election church (Norwegian: valgkirke). Together with more than 300 other parish churches across Norway, it was a polling station for elections to the 1814 Norwegian Constituent Assembly which wrote the Constitution of Norway. This was Norway's first national elections. Each church parish was a constituency that elected people called "electors" who later met together in each county to elect the representatives for the assembly that was to meet in Eidsvoll later that year.

In 1861, the old church was torn down and replaced with a new church building that was designed by the architect Christian Heinrich Grosch. In 1944, as the retreating German army was leaving Hasvik, they burned the church to the ground. The church was rebuilt in 1955 in an octagonal design. It was consecrated on 17 July 1955.

== See also ==
- List of churches in Nord-Hålogaland
