= Hasvik (village) =

Village in Hasvik, Norway

Hasvik: Hasvik (Norwegian); Hasviika (Kven)
- Village
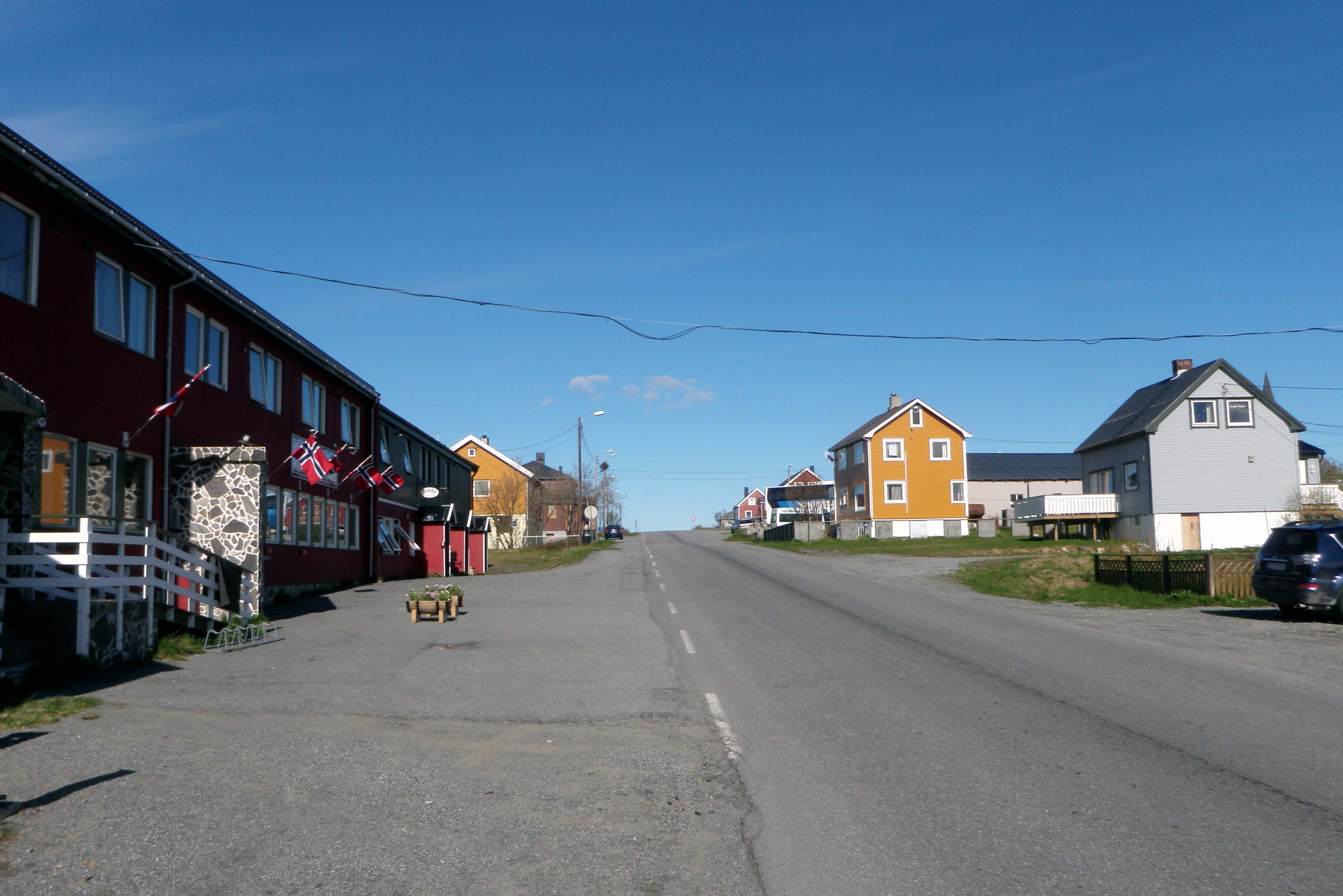
- View of the village
- Interactive map of Hasvik
- Location within Finnmark Location within Norway
- Coordinates: 70°29′11″N 22°09′39″E
- Country: Norway
- Region: Northern Norway
- County: Finnmark
- District: Vest-Finnmark
- Municipality: Hasvik Municipality

Area
  - Total: 0.53 km^{2} (0.20 sq mi)
- Elevation: 14 m (46 ft)

Population (2023)
  - Total: 358
  - Density: 675/km^{2} (1,750/sq mi)
- Time zone: UTC+01:00 (CET)
  - Summer (DST): UTC+02:00 (CEST)
- Post Code: 9590 Hasvik

Hasvik (Norwegian) or Hasviika (Kven) is a village in Hasvik Municipality in Finnmark county, Norway. The village is located on the southwestern tip of the large island of Sørøya. The village lies about 15 kilometres (9.3 mi) south of the municipal centre of Breivikbotn.

This village has Sørøya's only connections to the rest of Norway: Hasvik Airport and a car ferry to Øksfjord on the mainland. The 0.53-square-kilometre (130-acre) village has a population (2023) of 358 and a population density of 675 inhabitants per square kilometre (1,750/sq mi).

== History ==
On 4 July 1809, Hasvik was attacked by the British Royal Navy brig HMS Snake. As the village had no defences, the crew of Snake sacked Hasvik with little resistance before withdrawing on 9 July. The village's main church, Hasvik Church, was constructed at its current location during the 1700s. It was burnt by retreating German occupational forces in 1944, and rebuilt in 1955.
