= Hasvik Municipality =

Municipality in Finnmark, Norway

Hasvik Municipality Hasvik kommune Ákŋoluovtta gielda (Northern Sami) Hasviikan komuuni (Kven)
- Municipality
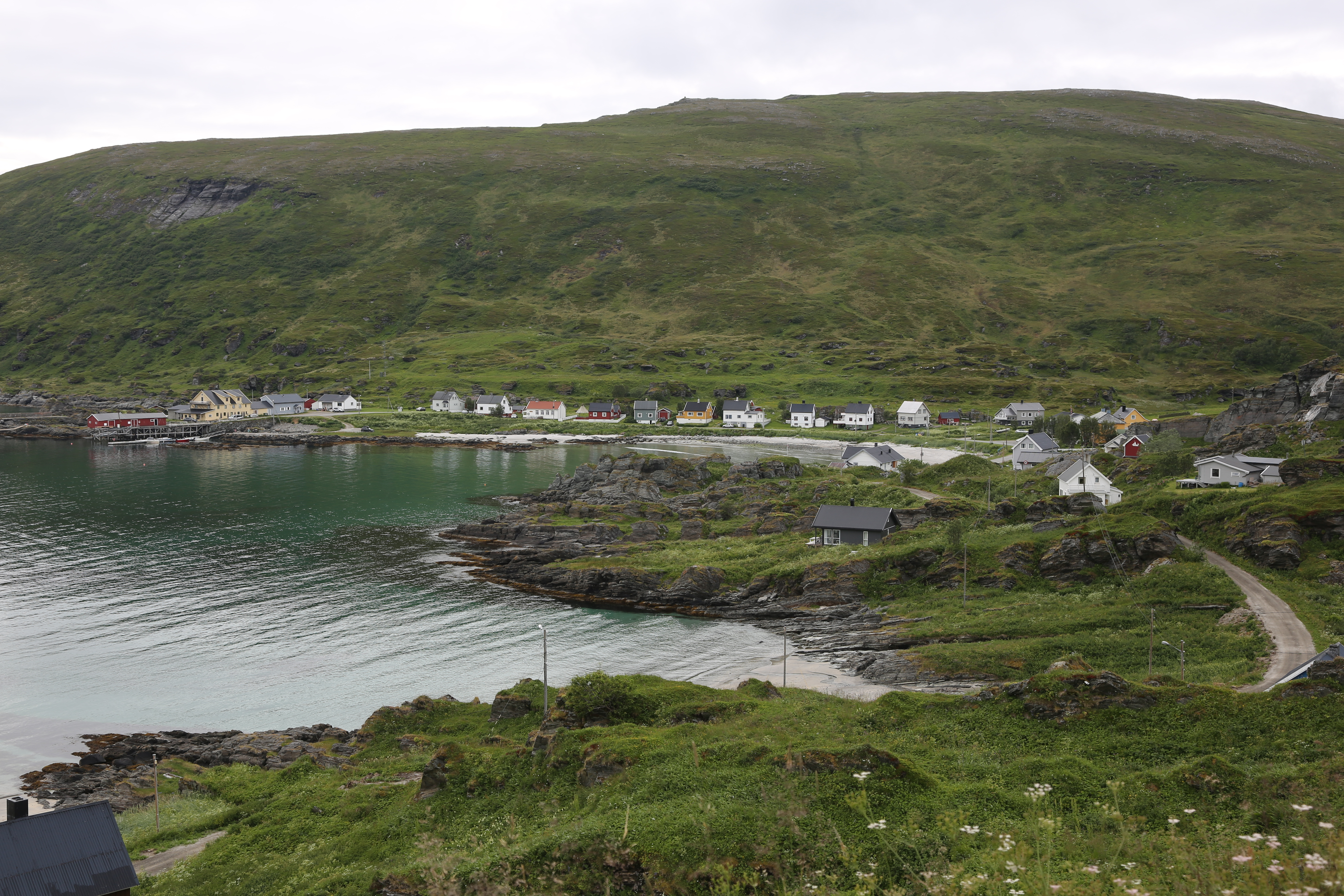
- Breivik village in Hasvik

- Flag Coat of arms

- Finnmark within Norway

- Hasvik within Finnmark
- Coordinates: 70°35′30″N 22°18′10″E
- Country: Norway
- County: Finnmark
- District: Vest-Finnmark
- Established: 1858
  - Preceded by: Loppa Municipality
- Administrative centre: Breivikbotn

Government
  - Mayor (2023): Lars Hustad (LL)

Area
  - Total: 555.43 km^{2} (214.45 sq mi)
  - Land: 533.58 km^{2} (206.02 sq mi)
  - Water: 21.85 km^{2} (8.44 sq mi) 3.9%
  - Rank: #195 in Norway
- Highest elevation: 958.7 m (3,145 ft)

Population (2024)
  - Total: 979
  - Rank: #336 in Norway
  - Density: 1.8/km^{2} (4.7/sq mi)
  - Change (10 years): ▼ −5.6%
- Demonym: Hasvikværing

Official language
  - Norwegian form: Bokmål
- Time zone: UTC+01:00 (CET)
  - Summer (DST): UTC+02:00 (CEST)
- ISO 3166 code: NO-5616

Hasvik (Northern Sami: Ákŋoluovtta gielda; Kven: Hasviikan komuuni) is a municipality in Finnmark county, Norway. The administrative centre of the municipality is the village of Breivikbotn. Other villages in the municipality include Breivik, Hasvik, and Sørvær. The population of Hasvik has generally been in steady decline due to problems within the fishing industry. Hasvik is an island municipality with no road connections to the rest of Norway. Hasvik Airport is served with regular connections to Tromsø and Hammerfest, and there is a two-hour ferry crossing to the village of Øksfjord on the mainland, providing access by car.

The 555-square-kilometre (214 sq mi) municipality is the 195th largest by area out of the 357 municipalities in Norway. Hasvik is the 336th most populous municipality in Norway with a population of 979. The municipality's population density is 1.8 inhabitants per square kilometre (4.7/sq mi) and its population has decreased by 5.6% over the previous 10-year period.

== General information ==
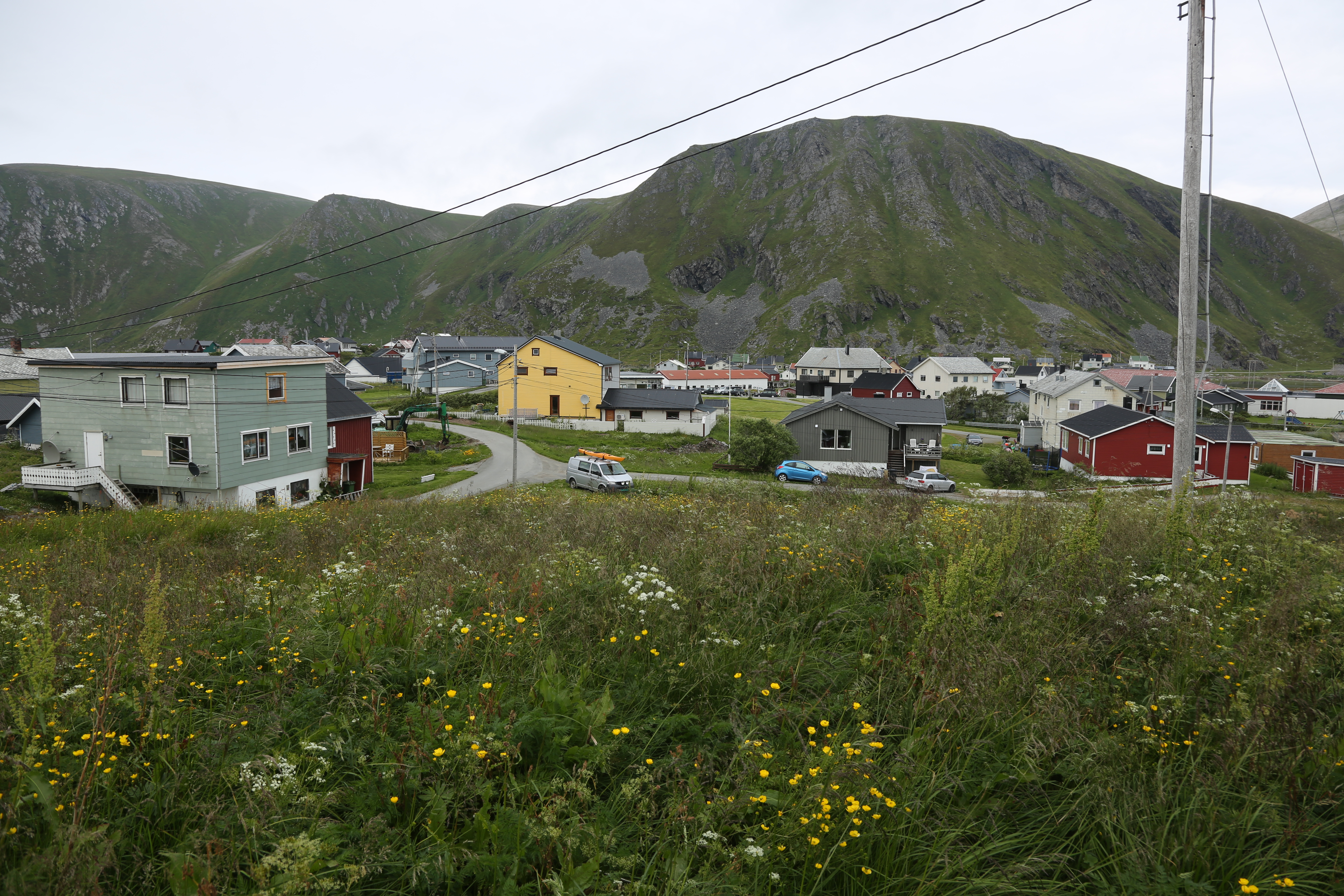
Sørvær village, Hasvik

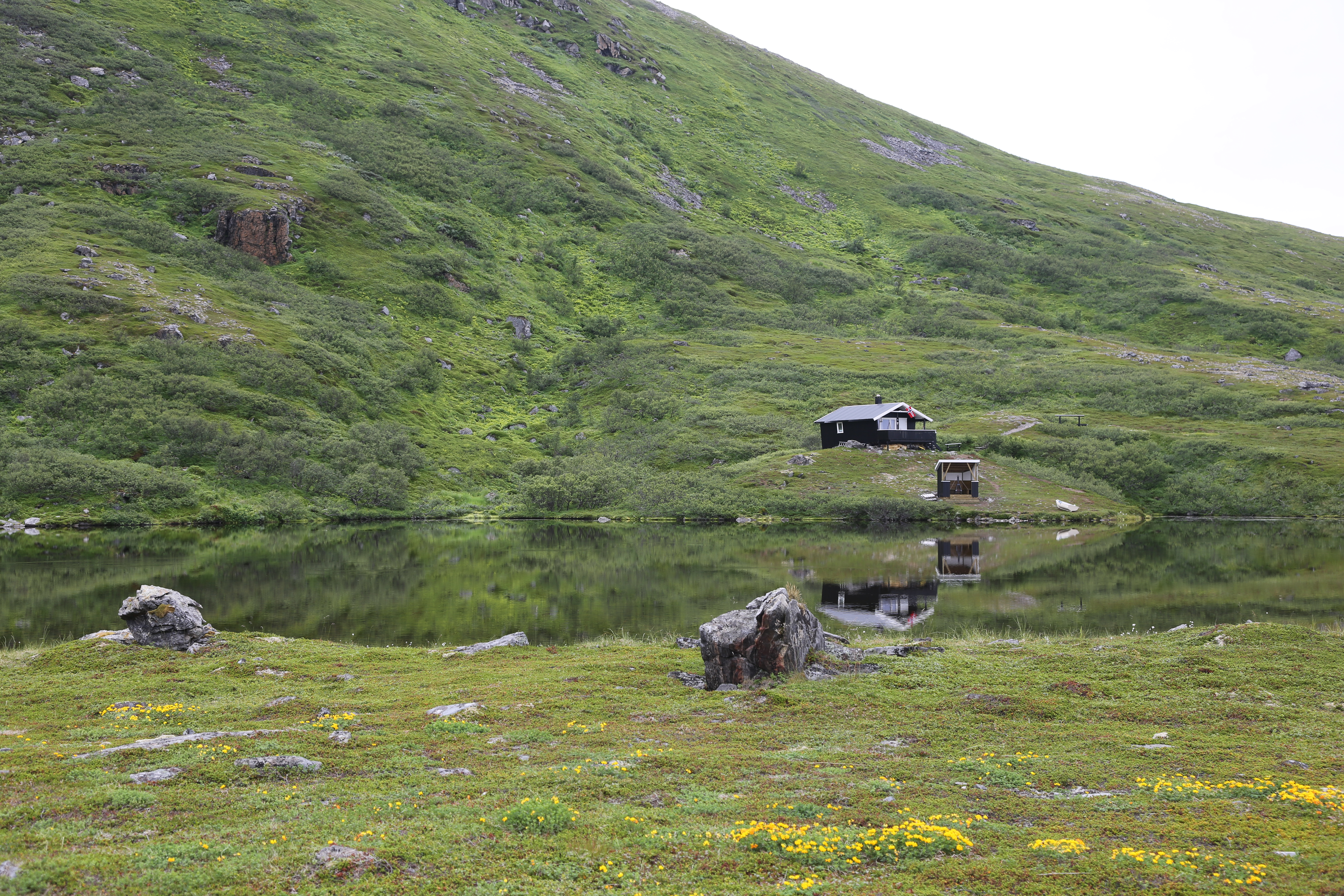
Lake in Hasvik, Sørøya island

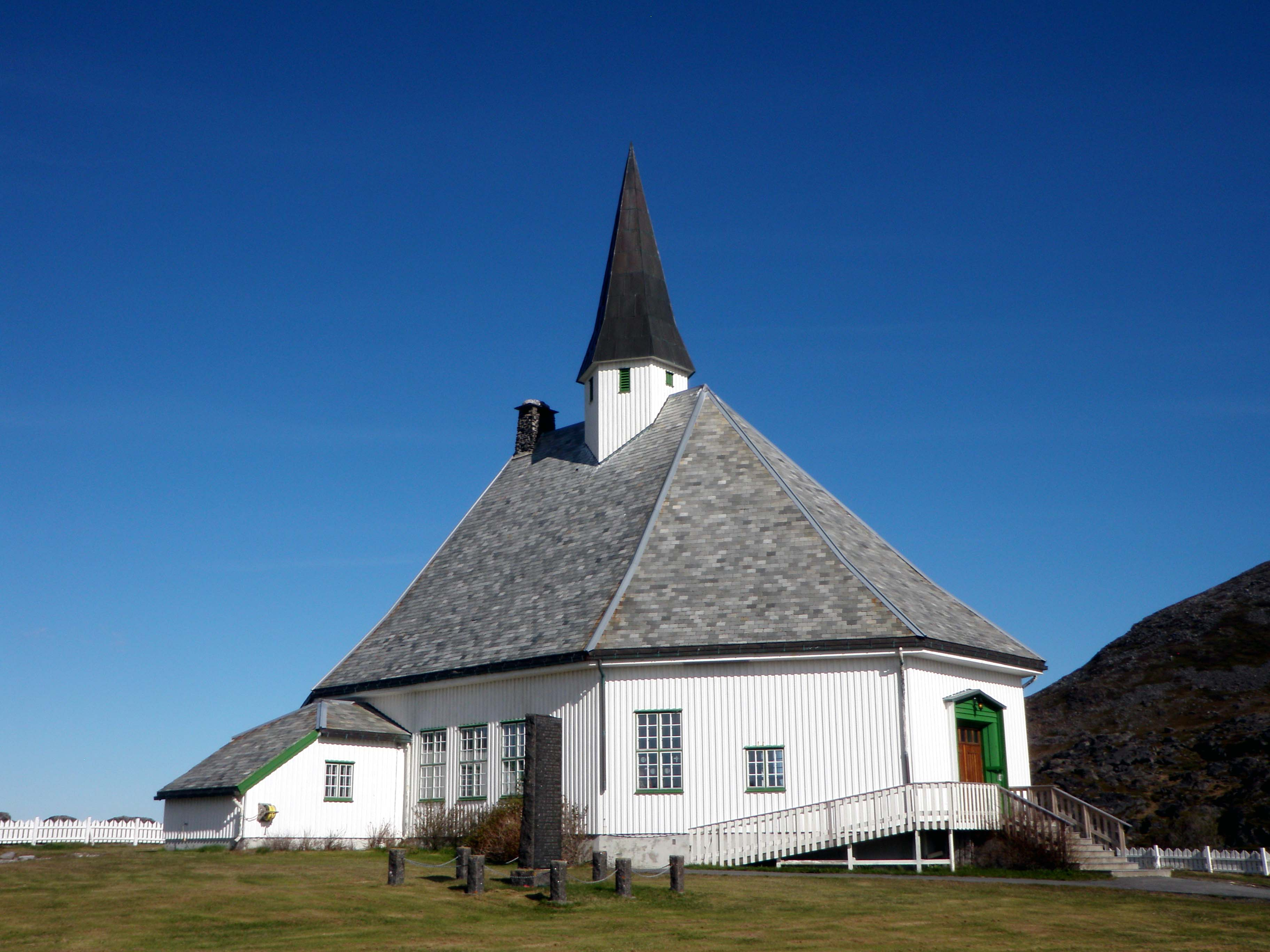
Hasvik Church

The municipality of Hasvik was established in 1858 when the northern part of Loppa Municipality was separated to form this new municipality. The initial population was 506. The borders of the municipality have not changed since that time.

On 1 January 2020, the municipality became part of the newly formed Troms og Finnmark county. Previously, it had been part of the old Finnmark county. On 1 January 2024, the Troms og Finnmark county was divided and the municipality once again became part of Finnmark county.

=== Name ===
The municipality (originally the parish) is named after the old Hasvik farm since the first Hasvik Church was built there. The first element is the genitive case of hár which means "high" or "tall", likely referring to the nearby mountain Håen (Norwegian: Hár). The last element is vík which means "cove" or "small bay".

=== Coat of arms ===
The coat of arms was granted on 13 July 1984. The official blazon is "Azure, a gull argent rising" (Norwegian: I blått en oppflygende hvit make). This means the arms have a blue field (background) and the charge is a seagull that is just taking flight. The seagull has a tincture of argent which means it is commonly colored white, but if it is made out of metal, then silver is used. The blue color in the field and the seagull were chosen by the municipality as a symbol for the local fishing and fish processing industry which attracts many seagulls. The design of the arms was proposed by Martha Gamst from Breivikbotn, and it was refined and finalized by Arvid Sveen.

== History ==
In 1900, Hasvik was connected to the telegraph system of the rest of Norway.

In June 1944, a Catalina aircraft crashed into a mountain in Hasvik, killing the crew of 6; the crew consisted of Soviet airmen wearing American uniforms; the aircraft was flying from the U.S. to Murmansk, Russia via Iceland. (138 PBN-1s produced by Naval Aircraft Factory served with the Soviet Navy, after the NAF transferred ownership via Project ZEBRA). The remains of the crew members were moved out of Norway after World War II.

In 2021, a plaque was unveiled in the presence of minister of defence, representatives from embassies of USA and Russia, and a Russian military attaché; 6 Soviet airmen who died in 1944, were honored.

=== Stranded Soviet warship ===
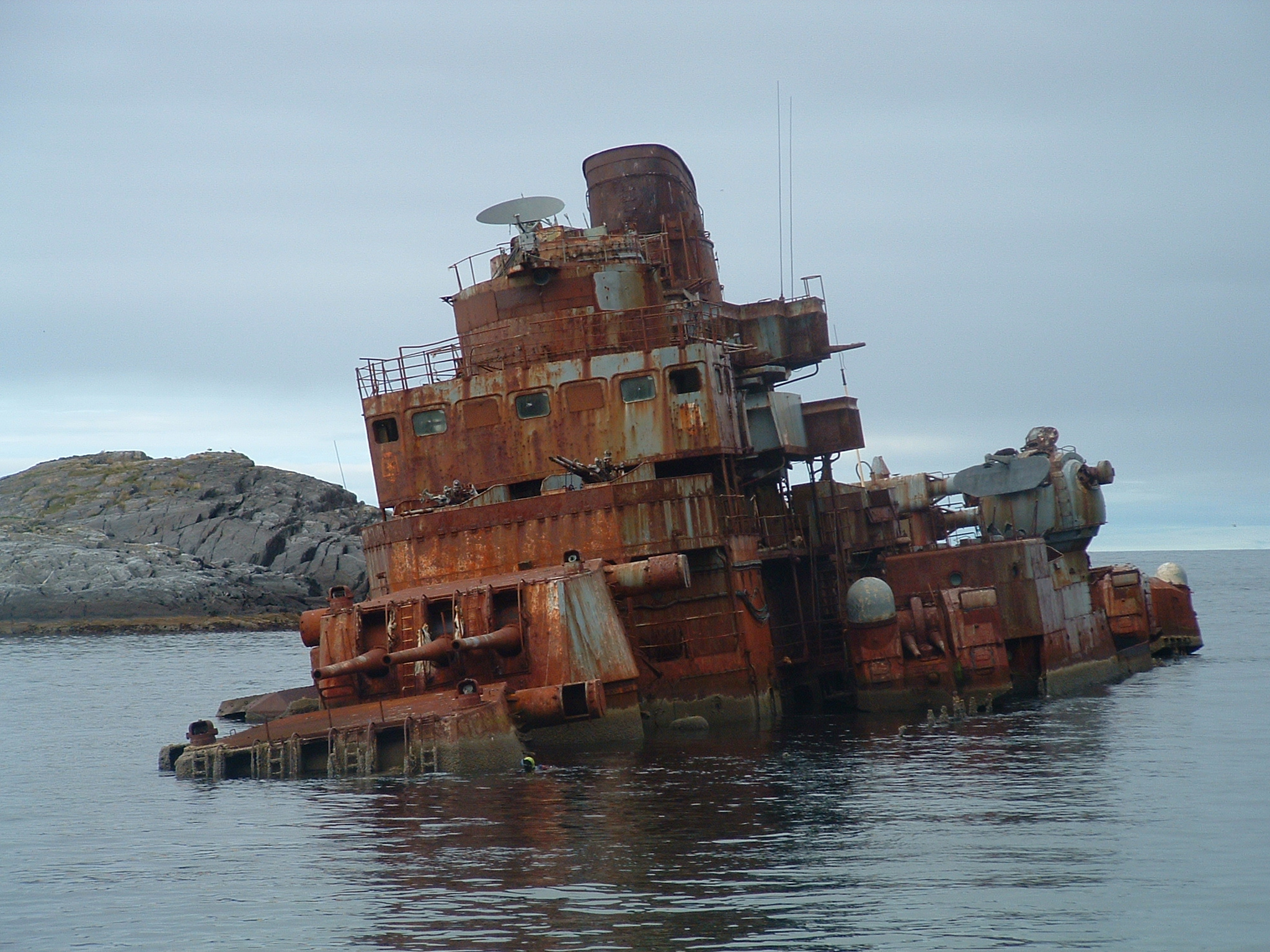
The ship was being towed for scrapping, but ran aground in Hasvik in 1994, and was removed in 2012.

In the sea off the village of Sørvær, the decommissioned Soviet cruiser Murmansk ran aground on Christmas Eve in 1994. Her towlines had snapped off the nearby North Cape while the vessel was on its way to India to be scrapped. She stayed in Sørvær for 18 years.

In 2012, the operation to remove the vessel started. A breakwater and dry dock was constructed around the vessel to access it from land and demolish it where it rested. The dock around the wreck was sealed in April. By mid-May the dock was almost empty of water and the demolishing of the cruiser began. The project was completed in 2013.

== Government ==
Hasvik Municipality is responsible for primary education (through 10th grade), outpatient health services, senior citizen services, welfare and other social services, zoning, economic development, and municipal roads and utilities. The municipality is governed by a municipal council of directly elected representatives. The mayor is indirectly elected by a vote of the municipal council. The municipality is under the jurisdiction of the Vestre Finnmark District Court and the Hålogaland Court of Appeal.

=== Municipal council ===
The municipal council (Kommunestyre) of Hasvik Municipality is made up of 15 representatives that are elected to four year terms. The tables below show the current and historical composition of the council by political party.

Hasvik kommunestyre 2023–2027
| Party name (in Norwegian) | Number of representatives |
|---|---|
| Labour Party (Arbeiderpartiet) | 6 |
| Together for Sørøya (Sammen for Sørøya) | 8 |
| Common List Hasvik (Felleslista Hasvik) | 1 |
| Total number of members: | 15 |

Hasvik kommunestyre 2019–2023
| Party name (in Norwegian) | Number of representatives |
|---|---|
| Labour Party (Arbeiderpartiet) | 9 |
| Conservative Party (Høyre) | 3 |
| Centre Party (Senterpartiet) | 3 |
| Total number of members: | 15 |

Hasvik kommunestyre 2015–2019
| Party name (in Norwegian) | Number of representatives |
|---|---|
| Labour Party (Arbeiderpartiet) | 10 |
| Conservative Party (Høyre) | 3 |
| Centre Party (Senterpartiet) | 2 |
| Total number of members: | 15 |

Hasvik kommunestyre 2011–2015
| Party name (in Norwegian) | Number of representatives |
|---|---|
| Labour Party (Arbeiderpartiet) | 8 |
| Conservative Party (Høyre) | 3 |
| Centre Party (Senterpartiet) | 4 |
| Total number of members: | 15 |

Hasvik kommunestyre 2007–2011
| Party name (in Norwegian) | Number of representatives |
|---|---|
| Labour Party (Arbeiderpartiet) | 8 |
| Conservative Party (Høyre) | 1 |
| Centre Party (Senterpartiet) | 6 |
| Total number of members: | 15 |

Hasvik kommunestyre 2003–2007
| Party name (in Norwegian) | Number of representatives |
|---|---|
| Labour Party (Arbeiderpartiet) | 6 |
| Conservative Party (Høyre) | 1 |
| Centre Party (Senterpartiet) | 8 |
| Total number of members: | 15 |

Hasvik kommunestyre 1999–2003
| Party name (in Norwegian) | Number of representatives |
|---|---|
| Labour Party (Arbeiderpartiet) | 10 |
| Conservative Party (Høyre) | 2 |
| Centre Party (Senterpartiet) | 3 |
| Socialist Left Party (Sosialistisk Venstreparti) | 1 |
| Sørøy List (Sørøylista) | 1 |
| Total number of members: | 17 |

Hasvik kommunestyre 1995–1999
| Party name (in Norwegian) | Number of representatives |
|---|---|
| Labour Party (Arbeiderpartiet) | 10 |
| Conservative Party (Høyre) | 1 |
| Centre Party (Senterpartiet) | 3 |
| Socialist Left Party (Sosialistisk Venstreparti) | 1 |
| Sørøy List (Sørøylista) | 2 |
| Total number of members: | 17 |

Hasvik kommunestyre 1991–1995
| Party name (in Norwegian) | Number of representatives |
|---|---|
| Labour Party (Arbeiderpartiet) | 9 |
| Conservative Party (Høyre) | 2 |
| Socialist Left Party (Sosialistisk Venstreparti) | 2 |
| Sørøy List (Sørøylista) | 4 |
| Total number of members: | 17 |

Hasvik kommunestyre 1987–1991
| Party name (in Norwegian) | Number of representatives |
|---|---|
| Labour Party (Arbeiderpartiet) | 12 |
| Conservative Party (Høyre) | 2 |
| Socialist Left Party (Sosialistisk Venstreparti) | 3 |
| Total number of members: | 17 |

Hasvik kommunestyre 1983–1987
| Party name (in Norwegian) | Number of representatives |
|---|---|
| Labour Party (Arbeiderpartiet) | 10 |
| Conservative Party (Høyre) | 1 |
| Hasvik Socialist List (Hasvik Sosialistiske List) | 4 |
| Hasvik Fishermen Local List (Hasvik fiskerkretsliste) | 1 |
| Breivikbotn cross-party list (Breivikbotn tverrpolitiske liste) | 1 |
| Total number of members: | 17 |

Hasvik kommunestyre 1979–1983
| Party name (in Norwegian) | Number of representatives |
|---|---|
| Labour Party (Arbeiderpartiet) | 9 |
| Conservative Party (Høyre) | 2 |
| Christian Democratic Party (Kristelig Folkeparti) | 1 |
| Hasvik Socialist List (Hasvik Sosialistiske List) | 4 |
| Hasvik Local List (Hasvik Kretsliste) | 1 |
| Total number of members: | 17 |

Hasvik kommunestyre 1975–1979
| Party name (in Norwegian) | Number of representatives |
|---|---|
| Labour Party (Arbeiderpartiet) | 10 |
| Conservative Party (Høyre) | 2 |
| Christian Democratic Party (Kristelig Folkeparti) | 1 |
| Breivikbotn Socialist List (Breivikbotn Sosialistiske List) | 4 |
| Total number of members: | 17 |

Hasvik kommunestyre 1971–1975
| Party name (in Norwegian) | Number of representatives |
|---|---|
| Conservative Party (Høyre) | 2 |
| Local List(s) (Lokale lister) | 15 |
| Total number of members: | 17 |

Hasvik kommunestyre 1967–1971
| Party name (in Norwegian) | Number of representatives |
|---|---|
| Labour Party (Arbeiderpartiet) | 8 |
| Conservative Party (Høyre) | 1 |
| Socialist People's Party (Sosialistisk Folkeparti) | 1 |
| Local List(s) (Lokale lister) | 7 |
| Total number of members: | 17 |

Hasvik kommunestyre 1963–1967
| Party name (in Norwegian) | Number of representatives |
|---|---|
| Labour Party (Arbeiderpartiet) | 9 |
| Conservative Party (Høyre) | 2 |
| List of workers, fishermen, and small farmholders (Arbeidere, fiskere, småbrukere liste) | 6 |
| Total number of members: | 17 |

Hasvik herredsstyre 1959–1963
| Party name (in Norwegian) | Number of representatives |
|---|---|
| Labour Party (Arbeiderpartiet) | 11 |
| Conservative Party (Høyre) | 2 |
| List of workers, fishermen, and small farmholders (Arbeidere, fiskere, småbrukere liste) | 2 |
| Local List(s) (Lokale lister) | 2 |
| Total number of members: | 17 |

Hasvik herredsstyre 1955–1959
| Party name (in Norwegian) | Number of representatives |
|---|---|
| Labour Party (Arbeiderpartiet) | 12 |
| Conservative Party (Høyre) | 2 |
| Communist Party (Kommunistiske Parti) | 1 |
| Local List(s) (Lokale lister) | 2 |
| Total number of members: | 17 |

Hasvik herredsstyre 1951–1955
| Party name (in Norwegian) | Number of representatives |
|---|---|
| Labour Party (Arbeiderpartiet) | 4 |
| List of workers, fishermen, and small farmholders (Arbeidere, fiskere, småbrukere liste) | 1 |
| Local List(s) (Lokale lister) | 7 |
| Total number of members: | 12 |

Hasvik herredsstyre 1947–1951
| Party name (in Norwegian) | Number of representatives |
|---|---|
| Labour Party (Arbeiderpartiet) | 9 |
| List of workers, fishermen, and small farmholders (Arbeidere, fiskere, småbrukere liste) | 1 |
| Local List(s) (Lokale lister) | 2 |
| Total number of members: | 12 |

Hasvik herredsstyre 1945–1947
| Party name (in Norwegian) | Number of representatives |
|---|---|
| Labour Party (Arbeiderpartiet) | 4 |
| List of workers, fishermen, and small farmholders (Arbeidere, fiskere, småbrukere liste) | 2 |
| Local List(s) (Lokale lister) | 6 |
| Total number of members: | 12 |

Hasvik herredsstyre 1937–1941*
| Party name (in Norwegian) | Number of representatives |
|---|---|
| Labour Party (Arbeiderpartiet) | 8 |
| List of workers, fishermen, and small farmholders (Arbeidere, fiskere, småbrukere liste) | 2 |
| Joint List(s) of Non-Socialist Parties (Borgerlige Felleslister) | 1 |
| Local List(s) (Lokale lister) | 1 |
| Total number of members: | 12 |
Note: Due to the German occupation of Norway during World War II, no elections were held for new municipal councils until after the war ended in 1945.

=== Mayors ===
The mayor (Norwegian: ordfører) of Hasvik Municipality is the political leader of the municipality and the chairperson of the municipal council. Here is a list of people who have held this position:

- 1858–1862: Unknown
- 1863–1874: Ingvard Bernhard Floer
- 1874–1878: Johannes Holmboe Bull
- 1879–1883: Hans Christian Ingemann Østvold
- 1884–1888: Ole Mathisen
- 1889–1907: Andreas A. Jox
- 1908–1929: Albrekt Leonhard Krane (H)
- 1929–1934: Thorvald Kristian Gamst Berg (V)
- 1935–1941: Arthur Gustavsen (Ap)
- 1941–1945: Bjarne Krane (NS)
- 1945–1947: Arthur Gustavsen (Ap)
- 1948–1951: Sverre Bakken (Ap)
- 1952–1955: Hjalmar Jenssen (Ap)
- 1956–1959: Sverre Bakken (Ap)
- 1960–1963: Hjalmar Jenssen (Ap)
- 1964–1965: Edmund Johansen (Ap)
- 1968–1971: Klemet Olsen (Ap)
- 1971–1983: Arne Helge Danielsen (Ap)
- 1983–1991: Bjørnar Roald Hågensen (Ap)
- 1991–2003: Odd Egil Simonsen (Ap)
- 2003–2007: Geir Adelsten Iversen (Sp)
- 2007–2023: Eva Danielsen Husby (Ap)
- 2023–present: Lars Hustad (LL)

== Geography ==
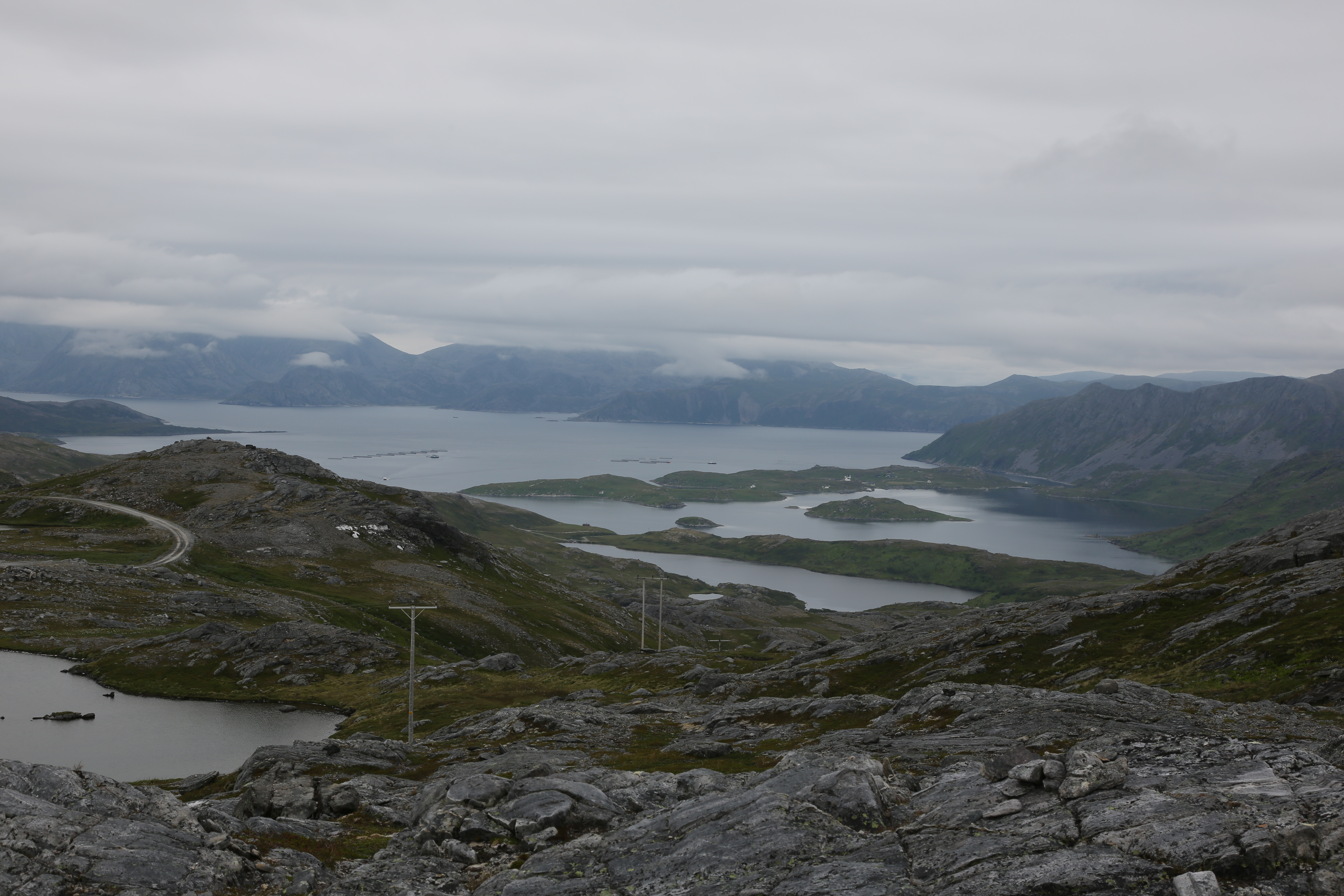
Dønnesfjord in Hasvik

The municipality of Hasvik is situated on the western side of Sørøya, Norway's fourth largest island (other than Svalbard). Most people in Hasvik are to be found in a string of settlements along the western coast: the three largest being Breivikbotn, Sørvær, and Hasvik. The municipality also includes the very sparsely populated northern part of the island of Stjernøya, including the Sørfjorden area. Stjernøya has no road or ferry connections. The highest point in the municipality is the 958.7-metre (3,145 ft) tall mountain Kjerringa.

=== Climate ===
Hasvik, situated on Sørøya island, has an either a subpolar oceanic climate (Cfc) or a subarctic climate (Dfc), depending on winter threshold used (−3 °C (27 °F) as in the original Köppen climate classification) or 0 °C (32 °F) as used in the US). Winter temperatures hover around freezing, and the short summers are cool. The winters are very mild considering the latitude of more than 70 degrees North. The driest season is April to July, and the wettest season is October to January. The wettest month October get more than twice as much precipitation as the driest month May. The all-time high temperature 28.7 °C (83.7 °F) was recorded August 2018; the all-time low −17.2 °C (1.0 °F) recorded in December 2002. The weather station at the small airport close to the village has been operating since January 1984. Extremes available since 2002.

Climate data for Hasvik Airport 1991-2020 (6 m, extremes 2002-2024)
| Month | Jan | Feb | Mar | Apr | May | Jun | Jul | Aug | Sep | Oct | Nov | Dec | Year |
|---|---|---|---|---|---|---|---|---|---|---|---|---|---|
| Record high °C (°F) | 8.5 (47.3) | 8.7 (47.7) | 9.3 (48.7) | 14.6 (58.3) | 21.2 (70.2) | 28.3 (82.9) | 28.4 (83.1) | 28.7 (83.7) | 21.4 (70.5) | 17.2 (63.0) | 12.3 (54.1) | 11.3 (52.3) | 28.7 (83.7) |
| Mean daily maximum °C (°F) | 0 (32) | 0 (32) | 0 (32) | 3 (37) | 7 (45) | 11 (52) | 14 (57) | 13 (55) | 11 (52) | 6 (43) | 3 (37) | 1 (34) | 6 (42) |
| Daily mean °C (°F) | −1.2 (29.8) | −1.7 (28.9) | −0.9 (30.4) | 1.3 (34.3) | 5 (41) | 8.6 (47.5) | 11.7 (53.1) | 11.3 (52.3) | 8.6 (47.5) | 4.4 (39.9) | 1.6 (34.9) | 0.1 (32.2) | 4.1 (39.3) |
| Mean daily minimum °C (°F) | −3 (27) | −3 (27) | −3 (27) | 0 (32) | 4 (39) | 8 (46) | 11 (52) | 10 (50) | 8 (46) | 4 (39) | 1 (34) | −1 (30) | 3 (37) |
| Record low °C (°F) | −13.5 (7.7) | −16.3 (2.7) | −13.5 (7.7) | −12.7 (9.1) | −7.8 (18.0) | 0 (32) | 2.8 (37.0) | 1.3 (34.3) | −2.2 (28.0) | −8 (18) | −12.3 (9.9) | −17.2 (1.0) | −17.2 (1.0) |
| Average precipitation mm (inches) | 74.1 (2.92) | 61.3 (2.41) | 61.5 (2.42) | 39.8 (1.57) | 37.9 (1.49) | 39 (1.5) | 41.1 (1.62) | 53.4 (2.10) | 65.6 (2.58) | 82.8 (3.26) | 70.3 (2.77) | 70.6 (2.78) | 810 (31.9) |
Source 1: yr.no/eklima - Norwegian Meteorological Institute
Source 2: Tititudorancea (avg highs/lows)

== Culture ==
Kvithellhula is a noted Rock shelter; five families were able to evade capture by Nazi-German forces during the Forced evacuation and razing of Finnmark and North Troms, in 1944.

=== Churches ===
The Church of Norway has one parish (sokn) within Hasvik Municipality. It is part of the Alta prosti (deanery) in the Diocese of Nord-Hålogaland.

Churches in Hasvik Municipality
| Parish (sokn) | Church name | Location of the church | Year built |
|---|---|---|---|
| Hasvik | Breivikbotn Chapel | Breivikbotn | 1959 |
| Hasvik | Dønnesfjord Church | Dønnesfjord | 1888 |
| Hasvik | Hasvik Church | Hasvik | 1955 |
| Hasvik | Sørvær Chapel | Sørvær | 1968 |
