= Sørøya =

Island in Finnmark, Norway

Sørøya (Norwegian); Sállan (Northern Sami)
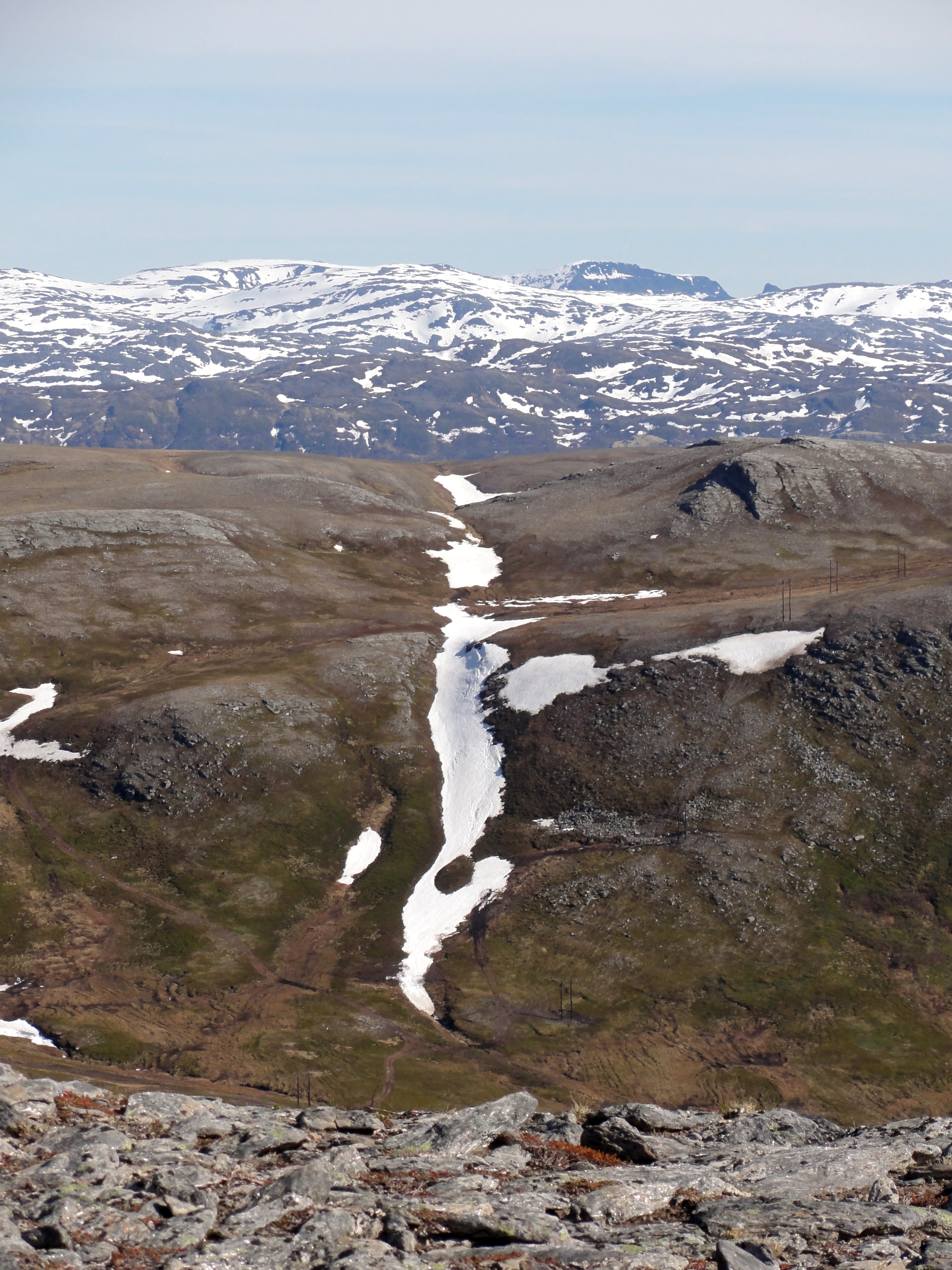
- View of the island
- Interactive map of: Sørøya (Norwegian); Sállan (Northern Sami)

Geography
- Location: Finnmark, Norway
- Coordinates: 70°35′N 22°44′E
- Area: 811 km^{2} (313 sq mi)
- Area rank: 4th largest in Norway
- Length: 64.3 km (39.95 mi)
- Width: 23.3 km (14.48 mi)
- Highest elevation: 659 m (2162 ft)
- Highest point: Komagaksla

Administration
- Norway
- County: Finnmark
- Municipalities: Hammerfest Municipality and Hasvik Municipality

Demographics
- Population: 1,100 (2026)
- Pop. density: 1.3/km^{2} (3.4/sq mi)

Sørøya (Norwegian) or Sállan (Northern Sami) is Norway's fourth largest island in terms of area and the largest in Finnmark county. The 811-square-kilometre (313 sq mi) island is divided between Hasvik Municipality and Hammerfest Municipality. It is often claimed to be "one of the most beautiful" of the islands in Norway. In 2018, the population of the island was 1,100.

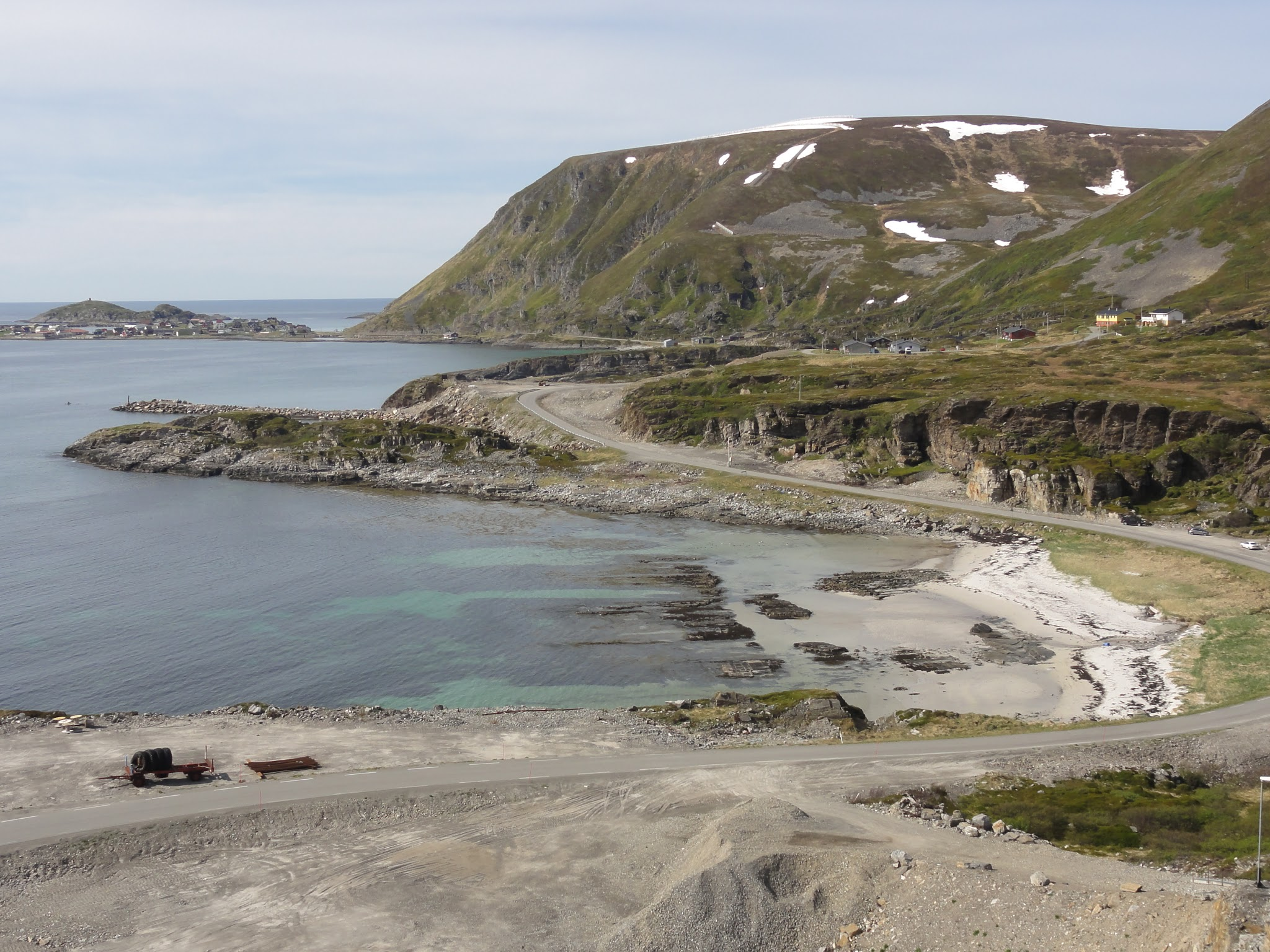
Scene in the North West of Sørøya

The island is very rocky and mountainous. The highest point on the island is the 659-metre (2,162 ft) tall mountain Komagaksla on the southern shore of the island. The coastline is very jagged and has numerous fjords that cut inland from the open ocean. The island is surrounded by the Norwegian Sea on the north and the Sørøysundet strait to the south. Across the Sørøysundet to the south are three large islands: Stjernøya, Seiland and Kvaløya. The island of Sørøya has no bridge or tunnel access, only a regular ferry route from the village of Hasvik to the village of Øksfjord on the mainland. Hasvik Airport is located on the southern tip of the island.

Most settlements on the island are along the southwestern shore in Hasvik, but there are scattered settlements in other areas of the island as well. The northeastern part of the island in Hammerfest has some settlements as well with some roads, but the roads are not all connected to each other.

There is no upper secondary school on the island.

== World War II ==
During World War II, a guerrilla group operated on the island, fighting against the occupying German forces.

On 15 February 1945, less than three months before the end of World War II in Europe, 525 Norwegian civilians were evacuated from Sørøya by four British Royal Navy destroyers and brought to safety in Scotland via Murmansk in the Soviet Union. The rescue operation was code named Operation Open Door. Later in February and March, fighting between Norwegian volunteers and German soldiers resulted in six dead Norwegians and fourteen captured, while between 30 and 100 German soldiers were killed.
