= History of Scandinavia =

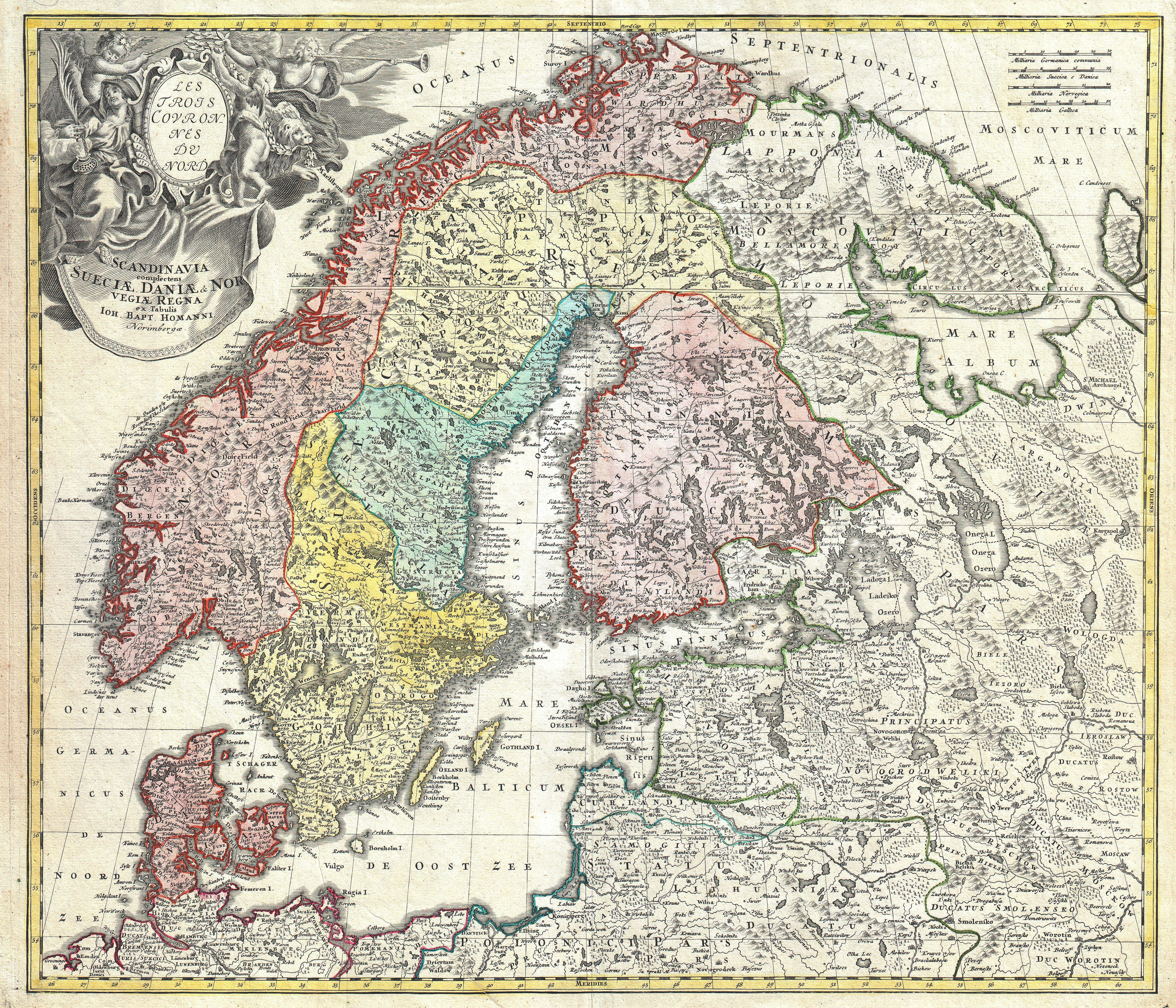
Map of Scandinavia, Finland and the Baltic Sea Region (by Johann Homann, c. 1730)

The history of Scandinavia is the history of the geographical region of Scandinavia and its peoples. The region is located in Northern Europe, and consists of Denmark, Norway and Sweden. Finland and Iceland are at times, especially in English-speaking contexts, considered part of Scandinavia.

== Prehistoric age ==
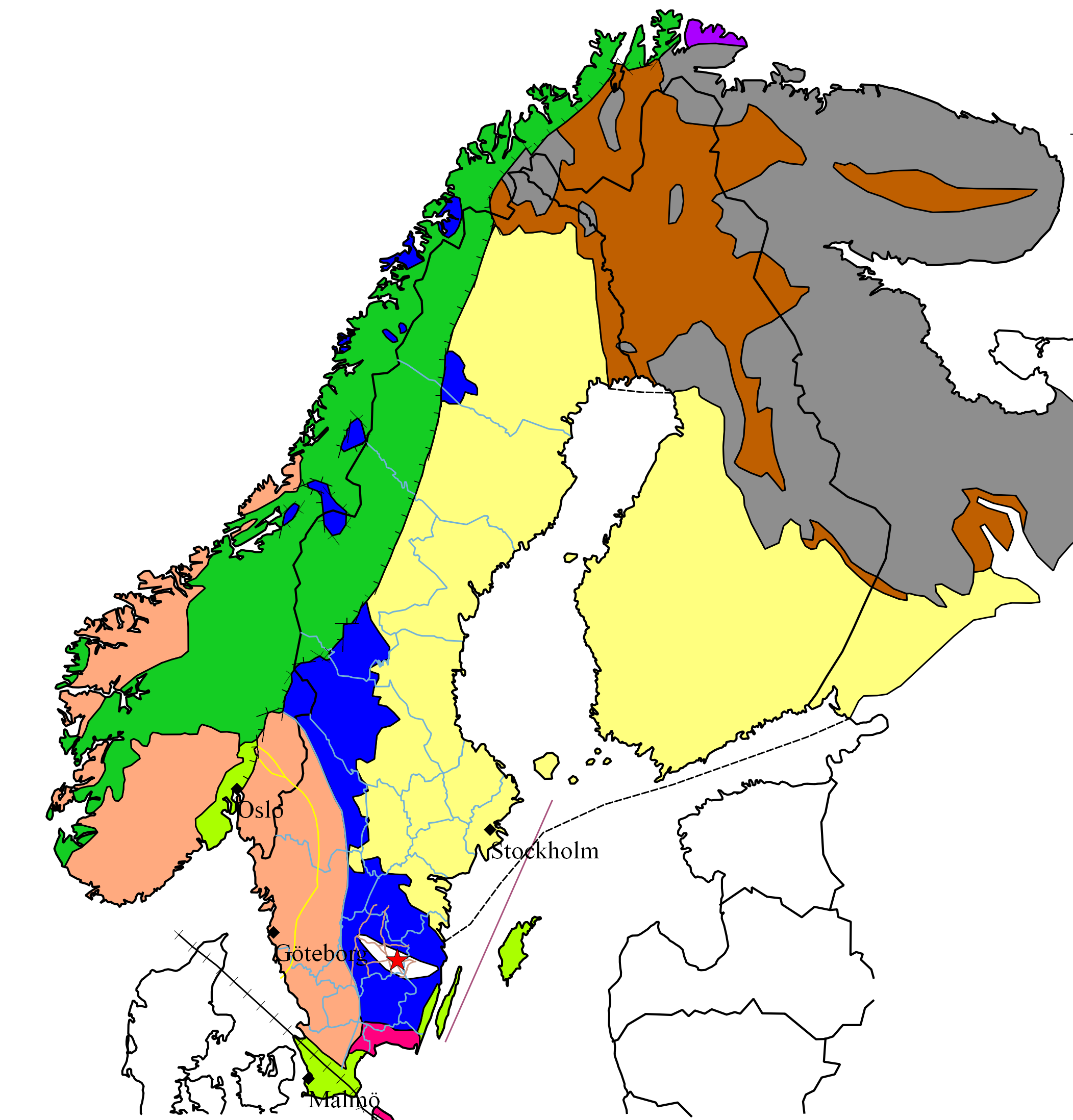
Geological map of the Scandinavian Peninsula and Fennoscandia: Archean rocks of the Karelia, Belomorian, and Kola domains Proterozoic rocks of the Karelia and Kola domains Svecofennian Domain Transscandinavian Igneous Belt Timanide Orogen Sveconorwegian Orogen (including the Western Gneiss Region) Caledonian nappes

Little evidence remains in Scandinavia of the Stone Age, the Bronze Age, or the Iron Age except limited numbers of tools created from stone, bronze, and iron, some jewelry and ornaments, and stone burial cairns. One important collection that exists, however, is a widespread and rich collection of stone drawings known as petroglyphs.

=== Stone Age ===
During the Weichselian glaciation, almost all of Scandinavia was buried beneath a thick permanent sheet of ice and the Stone Age was delayed in this region. Some valleys close to the watershed were indeed ice-free around 30,000 years B.P. Coastal areas were ice-free several times between 75,000 and 30,000 years B.P. and the final expansion towards the late Weichselian maximum took place after 28,000 years B.P. As the climate slowly warmed up at the end of the ice age and deglaciation took place, nomadic hunters from central Europe sporadically visited the region, but it was not until around 12,000 BCE before permanent, but nomadic, habitation took root.

==== Upper Paleolithic ====
As the ice receded, reindeer grazed on the flat lands of Denmark and southernmost Sweden. This was the land of the Ahrensburg culture, tribes who hunted over vast territories and lived in lavvus on the tundra. There was little forest in this region except for arctic white birch and rowan, but the taiga slowly appeared.

==== Mesolithic ====
From c. 9,000 to 6,000 B.P. (Middle to Late Mesolithic), Scandinavia was populated by mobile or semi-sedentary groups about whom little is known. They subsisted by hunting, fishing and gathering. Approximately 200 burial sites have been investigated in the region from this period of 3,000 years.

In the 7th millennium BC, when the reindeer and their hunters had moved for northern Scandinavia, forests had been established in the land. The Maglemosian culture lived in Denmark and southern Sweden. To the north, in Norway and most of southern Sweden, lived the Fosna-Hensbacka culture, who lived mostly along the edge of the forest. The northern hunter/gatherers followed the herds and the salmon runs, moving south during the winters, moving north again during the summers. These early peoples followed cultural traditions similar to those practised throughout other regions in the far north – areas including modern Finland, Russia, and across the Bering Strait into the northernmost strip of North America.

During the 6th millennium BC, southern Scandinavia was covered in temperate broadleaf and mixed forests. Fauna included aurochs, wisent, moose and red deer. The Kongemose culture was dominant in this time period. They hunted seals and fished in the rich waters. North of the Kongemose people lived other hunter-gatherers in most of southern Norway and Sweden called the Nøstvet and Lihult cultures, descendants of the Fosna and Hensbacka cultures. Near the end of the 6th millennium BC, the Kongemose culture was replaced by the Ertebølle culture in the south.

==== Neolithic ====
During the 5th millennium BC, the Ertebølle people learned pottery from neighbouring tribes in the south, who had begun to cultivate the land and keep animals. They too started to cultivate the land, and by 3000 BC they became part of the megalithic Funnelbeaker culture. During the 4th millennium BC, these Funnelbeaker tribes expanded into Sweden up to Uppland. The Nøstvet and Lihult tribes learnt new technology from the advancing farmers (but not agriculture) and became the Pitted Ware cultures towards the end of the 4th millennium BC. These Pitted Ware tribes halted the advance of the farmers and pushed them south into southwestern Sweden, but some say that the farmers were not killed or chased away, but that they voluntarily joined the Pitted Ware culture and became part of them. At least one settlement appears to be mixed, the Alvastra pile-dwelling.

It is not known what language these early Scandinavians spoke, but towards the end of the 3rd millennium BC, they were overrun by new tribes who many scholars think spoke Proto-Indo-European, the Battle-Axe culture. This new people advanced up to Uppland and the Oslofjord, and they probably provided the language that was the ancestor of the modern Scandinavian languages. They were cattle herders, and with them most of southern Scandinavia entered the Neolithic. The transmission of metallurgy to southern Scandinavia coincided with the introduction of long barrows, causewayed enclosures, two-aisled houses, and certain types of artefacts, and seems to have enabled the establishment of a fully Neolithic society.

=== Nordic Bronze Age ===
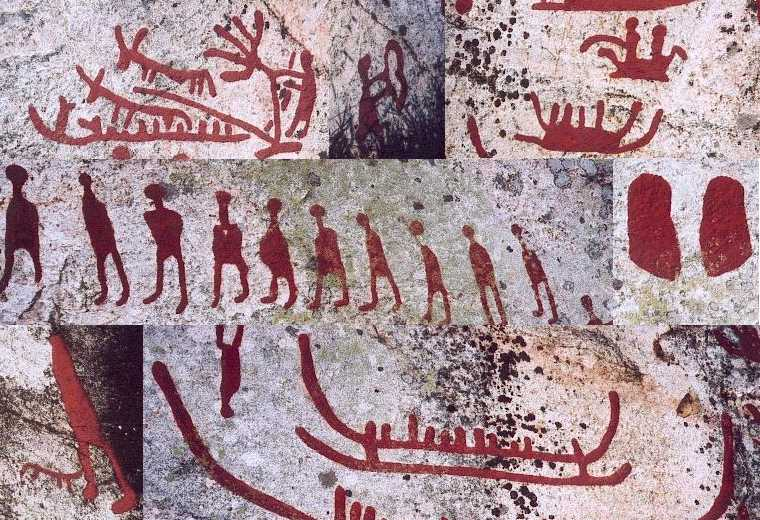
Petroglyphs from Scandinavia (Häljesta, Västmanland in Sweden). Composite image. Nordic Bronze Age. The glyphs are painted to make them more visible. It is unknown whether they were painted originally.

Even though Scandinavians joined the European Bronze Age cultures fairly late through trade, Scandinavian sites present rich and well-preserved objects made of wool, wood and imported Central European bronze and gold. During this period Scandinavia gave rise to the first known advanced civilization in this area following the Nordic Stone Age. The Scandinavians adopted many central European and Mediterranean symbols at the same time that they created new styles and objects. Mycenaean Greece, the Villanovan Culture, and Ancient Egypt have all been identified as possible sources of influence in Scandinavian artwork from this period. The foreign influence is believed to originate with amber trade, and amber found in Mycenaean graves from this period originates from the Baltic Sea. Several petroglyphs depict ships, and the large stone formations known as stone ships indicate that shipping played an important role in the culture. Several petroglyphs depict ships which could possibly be Mediterranean.

From this period there are many mounds and fields of petroglyphs, but their signification is long since lost. There are also numerous artifacts of bronze and gold. The rather crude appearance of the petroglyphs compared to the bronze works have given rise to the theory that they were produced by different cultures or different social groups. No written language existed in Scandinavia during the Bronze Age.

The Nordic Bronze Age was characterized by a warm climate comparable to that of the Mediterranean which permitted a relatively dense population, but it ended with a climate change consisting of deteriorating, wetter and colder climate which is sometimes believed to have given rise to the legend of the Fimbulwinter. It seems very likely that the climate pushed the Germanic tribes southwards into continental Europe. During this time there was Scandinavian influence in Eastern Europe. A thousand years later, the numerous East Germanic tribes that claimed Scandinavian origins (Burgundians, Goths and Heruls), as did the Lombards, rendered Scandinavia (Scandza) the name "womb of nations" in Jordanes' Getica.

=== Pre-Roman Iron Age ===
The Nordic Bronze Age ended with a deteriorating, colder and wetter climate. This period is known for being poor in archaeological finds.

This is also the period when the Germanic tribes became known to the Mediterranean world and the Romans. In 113–101 BC two Germanic tribes originating from Jutland, in modern-day Denmark, attacked the Roman Republic in what is today known as the Cimbrian War. These two tribes, the Cimbri and the Teutons, initially inflicted the heaviest losses that Rome had suffered since the Second Punic War. The Cimbri and the Teutons were eventually defeated by the Roman legions.

Initially iron was valuable and was used for decoration. The oldest objects were needles, but swords and sickles are found as well. Bronze continued to be used during the whole period but was mostly used for decoration. The traditions were a continuity from the Nordic Bronze Age, but there were strong influences from the Hallstatt culture in Central Europe. They continued with the Urnfield culture tradition of burning corpses and placing the remains in urns. During the last centuries, influences from the Central European La Tène culture spread to Scandinavia from northwestern Germany, and there are finds from this period from all the provinces of southern Scandinavia. From this time archaeologists have found swords, shieldbosses, spearheads, scissors, sickles, pincers, knives, needles, buckles, kettles, etc. Bronze continued to be used for torques and kettles, the style of which were a continuity from the Bronze Age. One of the most prominent finds is the Dejbjerg wagon from Jutland, a four-wheeled wagon of wood with bronze parts.

=== Roman Iron Age ===
While many Germanic tribes sustained continued contact with the culture and military presence of the Roman Empire, much of Scandinavia existed on the most extreme periphery of the Latin world. With the exception of the passing references to the Swedes (Suiones) and the Geats (Gautoi), much of Scandinavia remained unrecorded by Roman authors.

In Scandinavia, there was a great import of goods, such as coins (more than 7,000), vessels, bronze images, glass beakers, enameled buckles, weapons, etc. Moreover, the style of metal objects and clay vessels was markedly Roman. Some objects appeared for the first time, such as shears and pawns.

There are also many bog bodies from this time in Denmark, Schleswig and southern Sweden. Together with the bodies, there are weapons, household wares and clothes of wool. Great ships made for rowing have been found from the 4th century in Nydam mosse in Schleswig. Many were buried without burning, but the burning tradition later regained its popularity.

Through the 5th century and 6th century, gold and silver became more common. Much of this can be attributed to the ransacking of the Roman Empire by Germanic tribes, from which many Scandinavians returned with gold and silver.

=== Germanic Iron Age ===
The period succeeding the fall of the Roman Empire is known as the Germanic Iron Age, and it is divided into the early Germanic Iron and the late Germanic Iron Age, which in Sweden is known as the Vendel Age, with rich burials in the basin of Lake Mälaren. The early Germanic Iron Age is the period when the Danes appear in history, and according to Jordanes, they were of the same stock as the Swedes (suehans, suetidi) and had replaced the Heruls.

During the fall of the Roman empire, there was an abundance of gold that flowed into Scandinavia, and there are excellent works in gold from this period. Gold was used to make scabbard mountings and bracteates; notable examples are the Golden horns of Gallehus.

After the Roman Empire had disappeared, gold became scarce and Scandinavians began to make objects of gilded bronze, with decorations of interlacing animals in Scandinavian style. The early Germanic Iron Age decorations show animals that are rather faithful anatomically, but in the late Germanic Iron Age they evolve into intricate shapes with interlacing and interwoven limbs that are well known from the Viking Age.

In February 2020, Secrets of the Ice Program researchers discovered a 1,500-year-old Viking arrowhead dating back to the Germanic Iron Age and locked in a glacier in southern Norway caused by the climate change in the Jotunheimen Mountains. The arrowhead made of iron was revealed with its cracked wooden shaft and a feather, is 17 cm long and weighs just 28 grams.

== Sami peoples ==
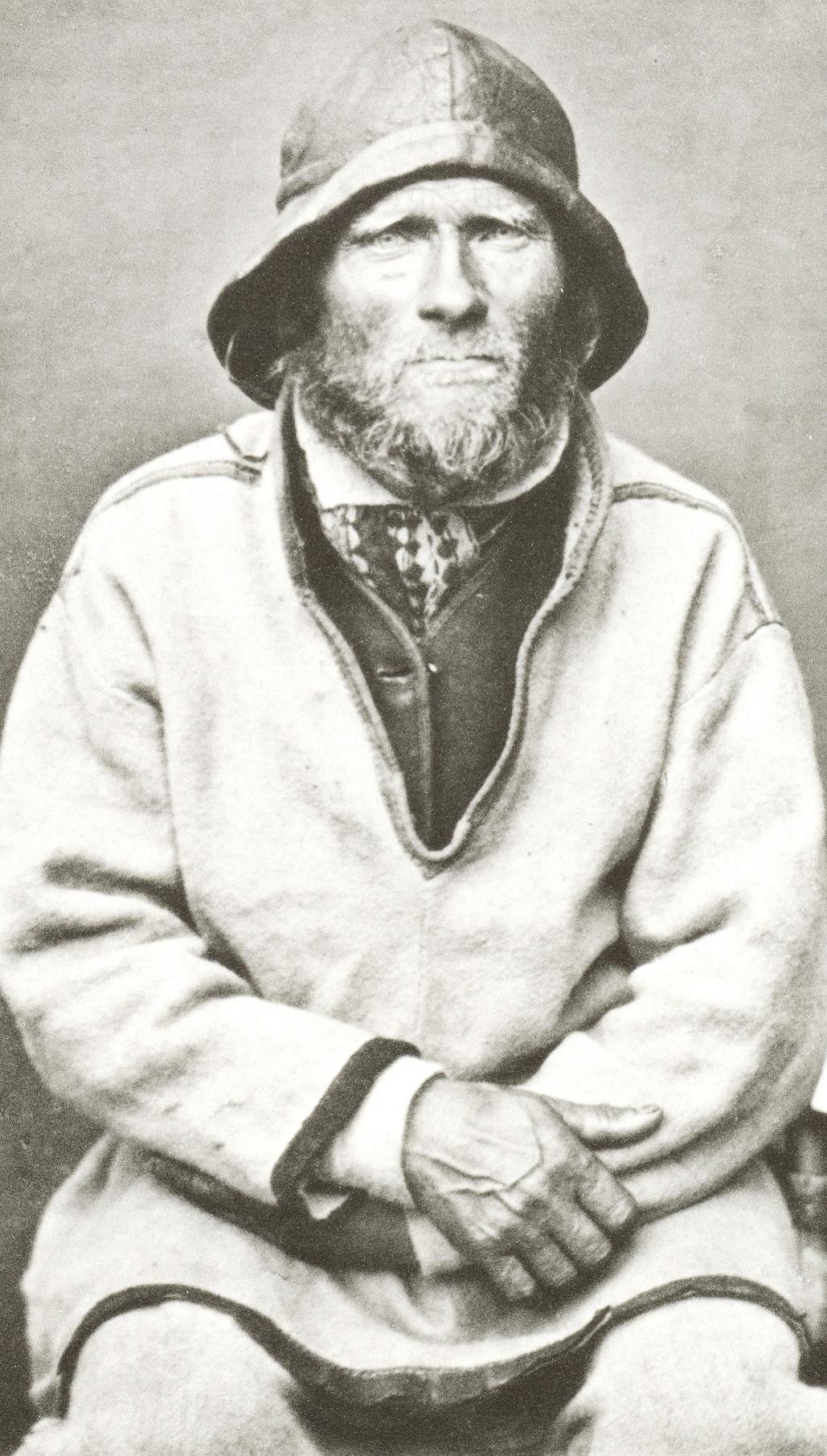
Ivar Samuelsen, Sea Saami (Sami, Sapmi). Man from Finnmark, a part of Sápmi within Norway

The Origins of the Sámi developed during prehistoric times, as the Sami people of Arctic Europe have lived and worked in an area that stretches over the northern parts of the regions now known as Norway, Sweden, Finland, and the Russian Kola Peninsula. The Sami are counted among the Arctic peoples and are members of circumpolar groups such as the Arctic Council Indigenous Peoples' Secretariat.

The Sámi have a complex relationship with the Scandinavians (known as Norse people in the medieval era), the dominant peoples of Scandinavia, who speak Scandinavian languages and who founded and thus dominated the kingdoms of Norway and Sweden in which most Sámi people live. While the Sámi have lived in Fennoscandia for around 3,500 years, Sámi settlement of Scandinavia does not predate Norse/Scandinavian settlement of Scandinavia, as sometimes popularly assumed due to the different definitions of the term "indigenous," which can refer to original inhabitants or in this case, culture that differs from the dominant one. The migration of Germanic-speaking peoples to Southern Scandinavia happened independently and separate from the later Sámi migrations into the northern regions.

Petroglyphs and archeological findings such as settlements dating from about 10,000 B.C. can be found in the traditional lands of the Sami. These hunters and gatherers of the late Paleolithic and early Mesolithic were named Komsa, who predated the Sami, and are thought to have mixed with other populations that would later become part of Sami culture.

The Sami have been recognized as an indigenous people in Norway since 1990 according to ILO convention 169, and hence, according to international law, the Sami people in Norway are entitled special protection and rights.

== Viking Age ==
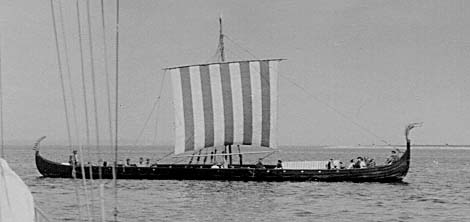
A reconstructed Viking ship

During the Viking Age, the Vikings (Scandinavian warriors and traders) raided, colonized and explored large parts of Europe, the Middle East, northern Africa, as far west as Newfoundland.

The beginning of the Viking Age is commonly given as 793, when Vikings pillaged the important British island monastery of Lindisfarne, and its end is marked by the unsuccessful invasion of England attempted by Harald Hårdråde in 1066 and the Norman Conquest.

=== Age of settlement ===
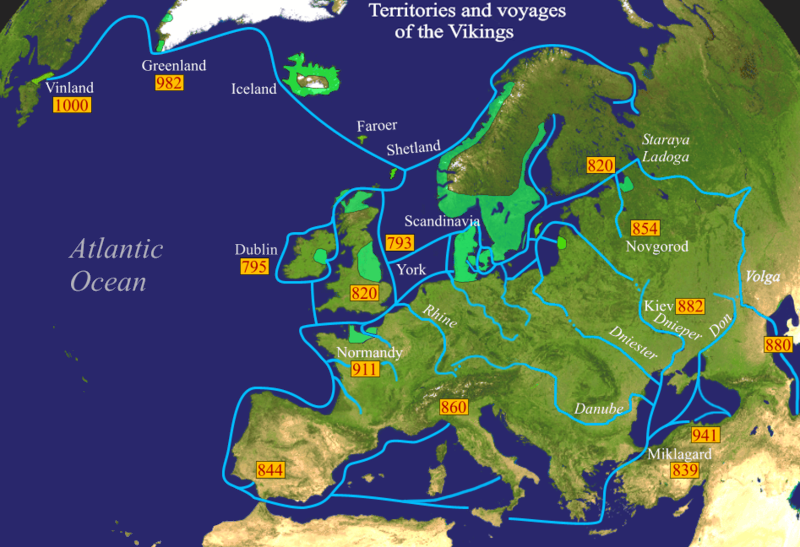
Scandinavian settlements and voyages

The age of settlement began around 800 AD. The Vikings invaded and eventually settled in Scotland, England, Greenland, the Faroe Islands, Iceland, Ireland, Livonia, Normandy, the Shetland Islands, Sicily, Rus' and Vinland, on what is now known as the Island of Newfoundland. Swedish settlers were mostly present in Rus, Livonia, and other eastern regions while the Norwegians and the Danish were primarily concentrated in western and northern Europe. These eastern-traveling Scandinavian migrants were eventually known as Varangians (væringjar, meaning "sworn men"), and according to the oldest Slavic sources, these varangians founded Kievan Rus, the major East European state prior to the Mongol invasions. The western-led warriors, eventually known as Vikings, left great cultural marks on regions such as French Normandy, England, and Ireland, where the city of Dublin was founded by Viking invaders. Iceland first became colonized in the late 9th century.

==== Relation with the Baltic Slavs ====
Before and during this age, the Norsemen significantly intermixed with the Slavs. The Slavic and Viking cultures influenced each other: Slavic and Viking tribes were "closely linked, fighting one another, intermixing and trading". In the Middle Ages, a significant amount of ware was transferred from Slavic areas to Scandinavia, and Denmark was "a melting pot of Slavic and Scandinavian elements". The presence of Slavs in Scandinavia is "more significant than previously thought" although "the Slavs and their interaction with Scandinavia have not been adequately investigated". A grave of a warrior-woman dating to the 10th century in Denmark was long thought to belong to a Viking. However, new analyses revealed that the woman was a Slav from present-day Poland. The first king of the Swedes, Eric, was married to Gunhild, of the Polish House of Piast. Likewise, his son, Olof, fell in love with Edla, a Slavic woman, and took her as his frilla (concubine). They had a son and a daughter: Emund the Old, King of Sweden, and Astrid, Queen of Norway. Cnut the Great, King of Denmark, England and Norway, was the son of a daughter of Mieszko I of Poland, possibly the former Polish queen of Sweden, wife of Eric.

=== Christianization ===
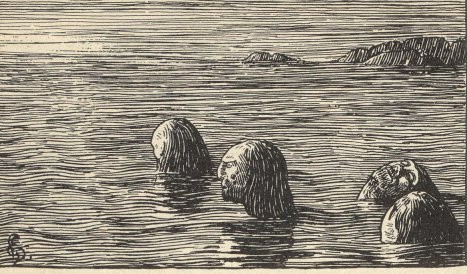
During the Christianization of Norway, King Olaf ordered (seidmen) tied and left on a skerry at ebb, resulting in a protracted death by drowning and the securing of Christian hegemony in the Norwegian kingdom.

Viking religious beliefs were heavily connected to Norse mythology. Vikings placed heavy emphasis on battle, honor and focused on the idea of Valhalla, a mythical home with the gods for fallen warriors. Another Norse tradition was that of blood feuds, which particularly had devastated Iceland.

Christianity in Scandinavia came later than most parts of Europe. In Denmark Harald Bluetooth Christianized the country around 965. The process of Christianization began in Norway during the reigns of Olaf Tryggvason (r. 995 AD – c. 1000 AD) and Olaf II Haraldsson (reigned 1015 AD–1030 AD). Olaf and Olaf II had been baptized voluntarily outside of Norway. Olaf II managed to bring English clergy to his country. Norway's conversion from the Norse religion to Christianity was mostly the result of English missionaries. As a result of the adoption of Christianity by the monarchy and eventually the entirety of the country, traditional shamanistic practices were marginalized and eventually persecuted. Völvas, practitioners of seid, a Scandinavian pre-Christian tradition, were executed or exiled under newly Christianized governments in the eleventh and twelfth centuries.

The Icelandic Commonwealth adopted Christianity in 1000 AD, after pressure from Norway. The Goði-chieftain Þorgeirr Ljósvetningagoði was instrumental in bringing this about. By formulating a law that made Christianity the official religion, but also that religious practice in the private sphere was outside of the law, he managed to stave off the threat from Norway, limiting the feuds and avoiding a religiously motivated civil war.

Sweden required a little more time to transition to Christianity, with indigenous religious practices commonly held in localized communities well until the end of the eleventh century. A brief Swedish civil war ensued in 1066 primarily reflecting the divisions between practitioners of indigenous religions and advocates of Christianity; by the mid-twelfth century, the Christian faction appeared to have triumphed; the once resistant center of Uppsala became the seat of the Swedish Archbishop in 1164. The Christianization of Scandinavia occurred nearly simultaneously with the end of the Viking era. The adoption of Christianity is believed to have aided in the absorption of Viking communities into the greater religious and cultural framework of the European continent.

== Kalmar Union ==
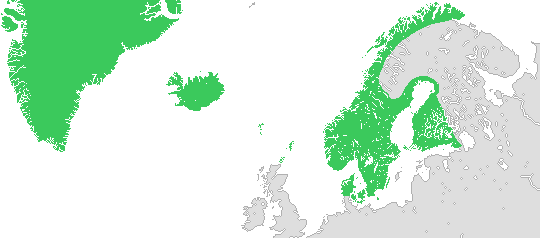
The Kalmar Union in 1397

The Kalmar Union (Danish/Norwegian/Swedish: Kalmarunionen) was a series of personal unions (1397–1520) that united the three kingdoms of Denmark, Norway and Sweden under a single monarch. The countries had given up their sovereignty but not their independence, and diverging interests (especially Swedish dissatisfaction over the Danish and Holsteinish dominance) gave rise to a conflict that would hamper it from the 1430s until its final dissolution in 1523.

The Northern Seven Years' War in 1563-1570 was the last serious attempt by a Danish King to re-create the Kalmar Union by force. The war ended with a minor Danish victory but not the total defeat of the Swedes. No more serious Danish attempts would be made to re-create the Kalmar Union following this war.

=== Reformation ===
The Protestant Reformation came to Scandinavia in the 1530s, and Scandinavia soon became one of the heartlands of Lutheranism. Catholicism almost completely vanished in Scandinavia, except for a small population in Denmark.

== 17th century ==
=== Thirty Years War ===
The Thirty Years' War was a conflict fought between the years 1618 and 1648, principally in the Central European territory of the Holy Roman Empire but also involving most of the major continental powers. Although it was from its outset a religious conflict between Protestants and Catholics, the self-preservation of the Habsburg dynasty was also a central motive. The Danes and then Swedes intervened at various points to protect their interests.

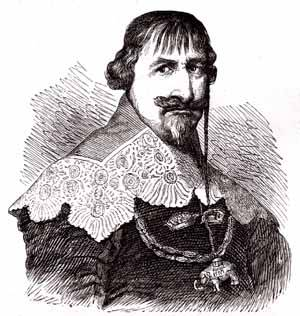
A portrait of Christian IV

The Danish intervention began when Christian IV (1577–1648) the King of Denmark–Norway, himself a Lutheran, helped the German Protestants by leading an army against the Holy Roman Empire, fearing that Denmark's sovereignty as a Protestant nation was being threatened. The period began in 1625 and lasted until 1629. Christian IV had profited greatly from his policies in northern Germany (Hamburg had been forced to accept Danish sovereignty in 1621, and in 1623 the Danish heir apparent was made Administrator of the Prince-Bishopric of Verden. In 1635 he became Administrator of the Prince-Archbishopric of Bremen too.) As an administrator, Christian IV had done remarkably well, obtaining for his kingdom a level of stability and wealth that was virtually unmatched elsewhere in Europe, paid for by the Øresund toll and extensive war reparations from Sweden. It also helped that the French regent Cardinal Richelieu was willing to pay for a Danish incursion into Germany. Christian IV invaded at the head of a mercenary army of 20,000 men, but the Danish forces were severely beaten, and Christian IV had to sign an ignominious defeat, the first in a series of military setbacks to weaken his kingdom.

The death of King Gustavus Adolphus on 16 November 1632 at the Battle of Lützen

The Swedish intervention began in 1630 and lasted until 1635. Some within Ferdinand II's court believed that Wallenstein wanted to take control of the German princes and thus gain influence over the emperor. Ferdinand II dismissed Wallenstein in 1630. He later recalled him after Gustavus Adolphus attacked the empire and prevailed in a number of significant battles.

Gustavus Adolphus, like Christian IV before him, came to aid the German Lutherans to forestall Catholic aggression against their homeland and to obtain economic influence in the German states around the Baltic Sea. Also like Christian IV, Gustavus Adolphus was subsidized by Richelieu, the Chief Minister of King Louis XIII of France, and by the Dutch. From 1630 to 1634, they drove the Catholic forces back and regained much of the occupied Protestant lands.

=== Rise of Sweden and the Swedish Empire ===
Sweden at the height of its territorial expansion, following the Treaty of Roskilde in 1658. The dark green area shows the extent of the Swedish motherland, as seen in the 17th century.

The Swedish rise to power began under the rule of Charles IX. During the Ingrian War Sweden expanded its territories eastward. Several other wars with Poland, Denmark-Norway, and German countries enabled further Swedish expansion, although there were some setbacks such as the Kalmar War. Sweden began consolidating its empire. Several other wars followed soon after including the Northern Wars and the Scanian War. Denmark suffered many defeats during this period. Finally under the rule of Charles XI the empire was consolidated under a semi-absolute monarchy.

== 18th century ==
=== Great Northern War ===
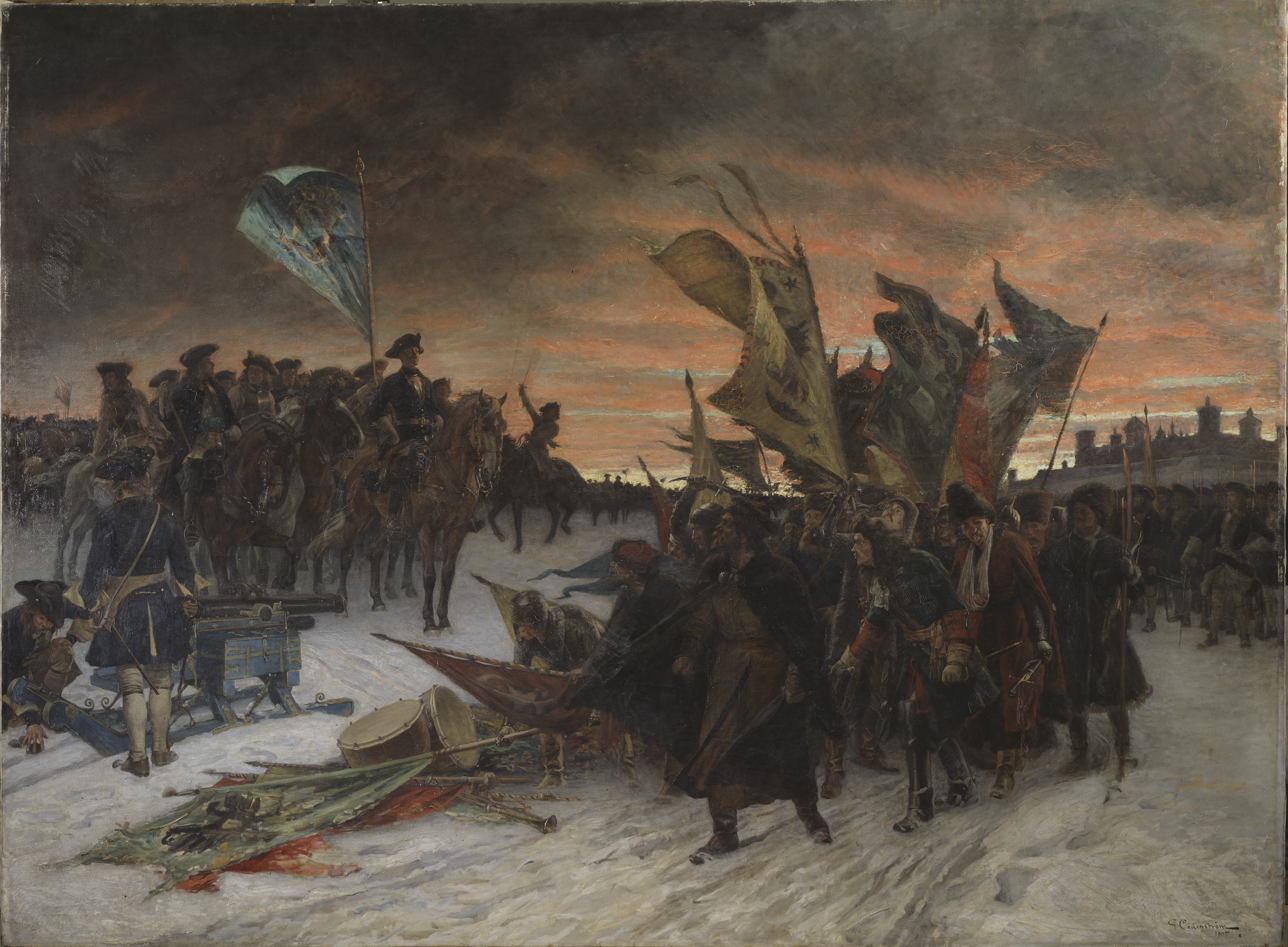
The Swedish victory at Narva, 1700, by Gustaf Cederström, painted in 1910

The Great Northern War was fought between a coalition of Russia, Denmark–Norway and Saxony-Poland (from 1715 also Prussia and Hanover) on one side and Sweden on the other side from 1700 to 1721. It started by a coordinated attack on Sweden by the coalition in 1700 and ended 1721 with the conclusion of the Treaty of Nystad and the Stockholm treaties. As a result of the war, Russia supplanted Sweden as the dominant power on the Baltic Sea and became a major player in European politics.

=== Colonialism ===
Both Sweden and Denmark-Norway maintained a number of colonies outside Scandinavia starting in the 17th century lasting until the 20th century. Greenland, Iceland and The Faroe Islands in the North Atlantic were Norwegian dependencies that were incorporated into the united kingdom of Denmark-Norway. In the Caribbean, Denmark started a colony on St Thomas in 1671, St John in 1718, and purchased Saint Croix from France in 1733. Denmark also maintained colonies in India, Tranquebar and Frederiksnagore. The Danish East India Company operated out of Tranquebar. Sweden also chartered a Swedish East India Company. During its heyday, the Danish and Swedish East India Companies imported more tea than the British East India Company – and smuggled 90% of it into Britain where it could be sold at a huge profit. Both East India Companies folded over the course of the Napoleonic Wars. Sweden had the short lived colony New Sweden in Delaware in North America during the 1630s and later acquired the islands of Saint-Barthélemy (1785–1878) and Guadeloupe in the Caribbean.

== 19th century ==
=== Napoleonic Wars ===
First Battle of Copenhagen, 1801

Scandinavia was divided during the Napoleonic Wars. Denmark-Norway tried to remain neutral but became involved in the conflict after British demands to turn over the navy. Britain thereafter attacked the Danish fleet at the battle of Copenhagen (1801) and bombarded the city during the second battle of Copenhagen (1807). Most of the Danish fleet was captured following the Second Battle of Copenhagen in 1807. The bombardment of Copenhagen led to an alliance with France and war with Britain, whose navy blockaded Denmark-Norway and cut lines of communication between the two kingdoms. Sweden, allied with Britain at the time, seized the opportunity to invade Norway in 1807 but was beaten back. The war with Britain was fought at sea in a series of battles, Battle of Zealand Point, Battle of Lyngør, and Battle of Anholt by the remnants of the Danish fleet in the ensuing years, as the Danes unsuccessfully tried to break the British blockade, in what became known as the Gunboat War. After the war, Denmark was forced to cede Heligoland to Britain.

Sweden joined the Third Coalition against Napoleon in 1805, but the coalition fell apart after the peace at Tilsit in 1807, forcing Russia to become the ally of France. Russia invaded Finland in 1808 and forced Sweden to cede that province at the peace of Fredrikshamn in 1809. The inept government of King Gustav IV Adolf led to his deposition and banishment. A new constitution was introduced, and his uncle Charles XIII was enthroned. Since he was childless, Sweden chose as his successor the commander in chief of the Norwegian army, Prince Christian August of Augustenborg. However, his sudden death in 1810 forced the Swedes to look for another candidate, and once more they chose an enemy officer. Jean-Baptiste Bernadotte, Marshal of France, would be named the next king. Baron Karl Otto Mörner, an obscure member of the Diet, was the one who initially extended the offer of the Swedish crown to the young soldier. Bernadotte was originally one of Napoleon's eighteen Marshals.

Sweden decided to join the alliance against France in 1813 and was promised Norway as a reward. After the battle of Leipzig in October 1813, Bernadotte abandoned the pursuit of Napoleon and marched against Denmark, where he forced the king of Denmark-Norway to conclude the Treaty of Kiel on 14 January 1814. Norway was ceded to the king of Sweden, but Denmark retained the Norwegian Atlantic possessions of the Faroe Islands, Iceland, and Greenland. However, the treaty of Kiel never came into force. Norway declared its independence, adopted a liberal constitution, and elected Prince Christian Frederik as king. After a short war with Sweden, Norway had to concede to a personal union with Sweden at the Convention of Moss. King Christian Frederik abdicated and left for Denmark in October, and the Norwegian Storting (parliament) elected the Swedish king as King of Norway, after having enacted such amendments to the constitution as were necessary to allow for the union with Sweden.

=== Finnish War ===
The Finnish War was fought between Sweden and Russia from February 1808 to September 1809. As a result of the war, Finland which formed the eastern third of Sweden proper became the autonomous Grand Duchy of Finland within Imperial Russia. Finland remained as a part of Russian Empire until 1917 at which point it became independent. Another notable effect was the Swedish parliament's adoption of a new constitution and a new royal house, that of Bernadotte.

=== Sweden and Norway ===
On 14 January 1814, at the Treaty of Kiel, the king of Denmark-Norway ceded Norway to the king of Sweden. The terms of the treaty provoked widespread opposition in Norway. The Norwegian vice-roy and heir to the throne of Denmark-Norway, Christian Frederik took the lead in a national uprising, assumed the title of regent, and convened a constitutional assembly at Eidsvoll. On 17 May 1814 the Constitution of Norway was signed by the assembly, and Christian Frederik was elected as king of independent Norway.

The Swedish king rejected the premise of an independent Norway and launched a military campaign on 27 July 1814, with an attack on the Hvaler islands and the city of Fredrikstad. The Swedish army was superior in numbers, was better equipped and trained, and was led by one of Napoleon's foremost generals, the newly elected Swedish crown prince, Jean Baptiste Bernadotte. Battles were short and decisively won by the Swedes. Armistice negotiations concluded on 14 August 1814.

In the peace negotiations, Christian Frederik agreed to relinquish claims to the Norwegian crown and return to Denmark if Sweden would accept the democratic Norwegian constitution and a loose personal union. On 4 November 1814, the Norwegian Parliament adopted the constitutional amendments required to enter a union with Sweden, and elected king Charles XIII as king of Norway.

Following growing dissatisfaction with the union in Norway, the parliament unanimously declared its dissolution on 7 June 1905. This unilateral action met with Swedish threats of war. A plebiscite on 13 August confirmed the parliamentary decision. Negotiations in Karlstad led to agreement with Sweden on 23 September and mutual demobilization. Both parliaments revoked the Act of Union 16 October, and the deposed king Oscar II of Sweden renounced his claim to the Norwegian throne and recognized Norway as an independent kingdom on 26 October. The Norwegian parliament offered the vacant throne to Prince Carl of Denmark, who accepted after another plebiscite had confirmed the monarchy. He arrived in Norway on 25 November 1905, taking the name Haakon VII.

=== Industrialization ===
Industrialization began in the mid 19th century in Scandinavia. In Denmark industrialization began in, and was confined to, Copenhagen until the 1890s, after which smaller towns began to grow rapidly. Denmark remained primarily agricultural until well into the 20th century, but agricultural processes were modernized and processing of dairy and meats became more important than the export of raw agricultural products.

Industrialization of Sweden experienced a boom during the First World War. The construction of a railway connecting southern Sweden and the northern mines was of primary importance.

=== Scandinavism ===
The modern use of the term Scandinavia rises from the Scandinavist political movement, which was active in the middle of the 19th century, chiefly between the First war of Schleswig (1848–1850), in which Sweden and Norway contributed with considerable military force, and the Second war of Schleswig (1864) when the Riksdag of the Estates denounced the King's promises of military support for Denmark.

=== Emigration ===
Many Scandinavians emigrated to Canada, the United States, Australia, Africa, and New Zealand during the later nineteenth century. The main wave of Scandinavian emigration occurred in the 1860s lasting until the 1880s, although substantial emigration continued until the 1930s. The vast majority of emigrants left from the countryside in search of better farming and economic opportunities. Together with Finland and Iceland, almost a third of the population left in the eighty years after 1850. Part of the reason for the large exodus was the increasing population caused by falling death rates, which increased unemployment. Norway had the largest percentage of emigrants and Denmark the least.

Between 1820 and 1920 just over two million Scandinavians settled in the United States. One million came from Sweden, 300,000 from Denmark, and 730,000 from Norway. The figure for Norway represents almost 80% of the national population in 1800. The most popular destinations in North America were Minnesota, Iowa, the Dakotas, Wisconsin, Michigan, the Canadian prairies and Ontario.

=== Monetary Union ===
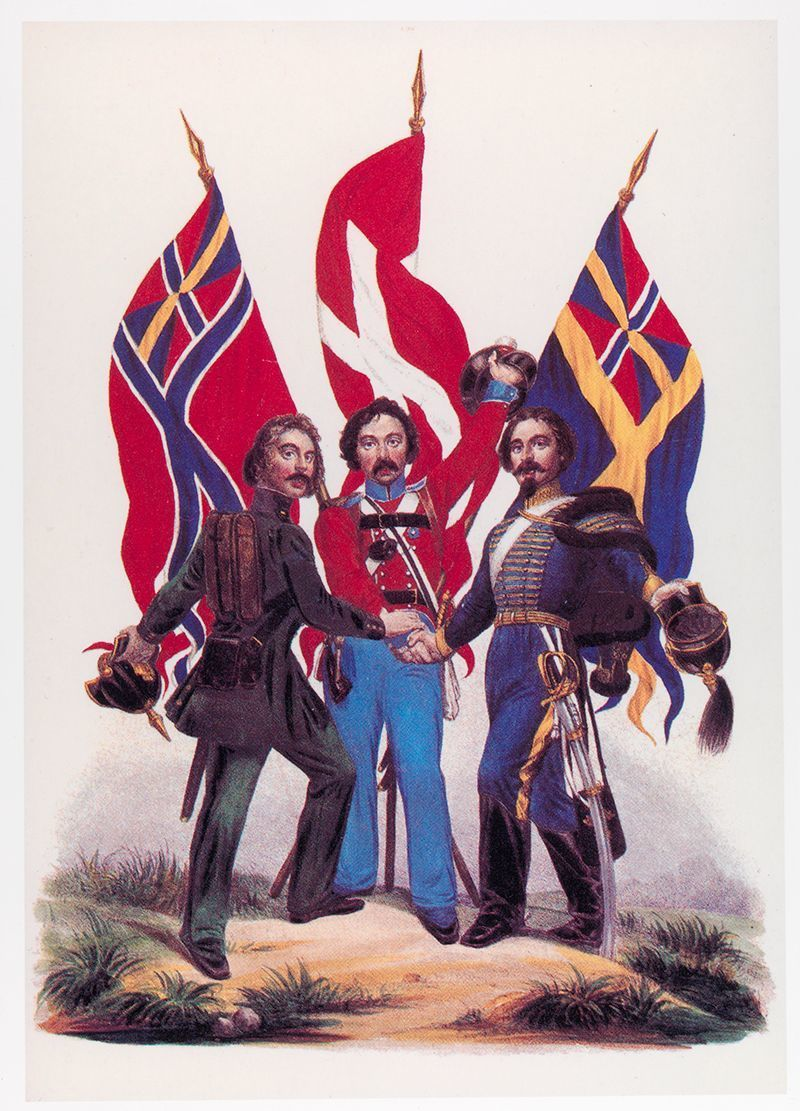
Scandinavism

The Scandinavian Monetary Union was a monetary union formed by Sweden and Denmark on 5 May 1873, by fixing their currencies against the gold standard at par to each other. Norway, which was in union with Sweden entered the union two years later, in 1875 by pegging its currency to gold at the same level as Denmark and Sweden (.403 grams ). The monetary union was one of the few tangible results of the Scandinavian political movement of the 19th century.

The union provided fixed exchange rates and stability in monetary terms, but the member countries continued to issue their own separate currencies. Even if it was not initially foreseen, the perceived security led to a situation where the formally separate currencies were accepted on a basis of "as good as" the legal tender virtually throughout the entire area.

The outbreak of World War I in 1914 brought an end to the monetary union. Sweden abandoned the tie to gold on 2 August 1914, and without a fixed exchange rate the free circulation came to an end.

== 20th century ==
=== First World War ===
All three Scandinavian countries remained neutral throughout the First World War. The war did have a significant impact on the economy of the area, primarily as a result of the British blockade of Germany. However, they were able to work around that with trade agreement with Britain. Norway's large merchant marine delivered vital supplies to Britain but suffered huge losses in ships and sailors because of indiscriminate attack by the German navy. Denmark called up much of its military, but Germany still violated Danish sovereignty to some extent, for example by mining the Øresund. A relatively large number of ethnic Danes from southern Jutland fought in the German army.

=== Development of the welfare state ===
All three countries developed social welfare states in the early to mid-20th century. This came about partially because of the domination of the social-democrats in Sweden and Denmark, and the Labour party in Norway.

=== Second World War ===
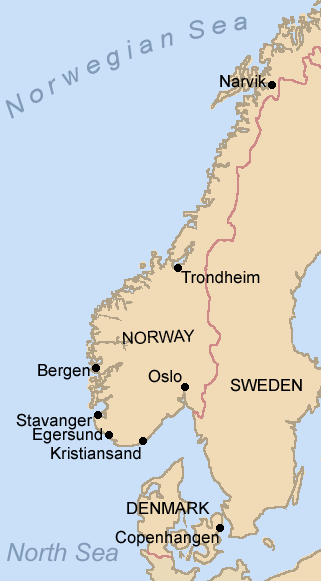
The German landing sites during the initial phase of Operation Weserübung

Near the beginning of World War II in late 1939, both the Allies and the Axis powers feared their enemies gaining power in Scandinavia. Britain believed Germany was planning to invade and made counter plans for its own invasion. At the same time, Germany feared that Britain could gain bases in the area and claimed they suspected an outright invasion. In addition, Germany highly valued the Swedish iron ore they received through Norway and could not afford to lose it. They also desired Norway for its ice-free ports. This made it a primary target, with Denmark a secondary goal mainly needed for facilitating the Norwegian invasion. After planning for months, Germany invaded both Denmark and Norway the same day, 9 April 1940, days before Britain planned to invade.

The nations reacted quite differently. Denmark surrendered two hours after invasion, having lost just sixteen men. They sought to avoid civilian casualties and receive favourable treatment from Germany. Norway however, refused to give in and fought valiantly and with the full strength of her limited and badly prepared forces. The Western allies sent military assistance, but the campaign was not effectively run. By 10 June 1940, Norway's official military had surrendered to the attackers, while King Haakon VII and his legal government fled to exile in Britain.

Denmark's strategy proved the more beneficial in the short run. It was one of the factors that led Germany to grant the Danes a high degree of autonomy. Another reason was that they had no real agenda in Denmark. After invading, they simply did not want to relinquish it, seeing it as a permanent part of their empire. Also, Danes were considered fellow Nordics and Aryans by Nazi ideologues, which further helped the country. For all these reasons, Denmark was able to retain their parliament, king, and much of their normal domestic function. However, bitterness towards Germany grew, and small sabotages directed against Germany became commonplace. Germany eventually reacted by eliminating Denmark's representative government and imposing martial law.

Norway was treated much more harshly throughout their occupation. Opposition parties were eliminated and Nasjonal Samling ("National Unity"), the Norwegian fascist political party, appointed all government officials. Vidkun Quisling was installed as Minister-President, a puppet to Berlin's High Command. Labor unions could only exist if they accepted Nazi control. These repressive measures ensured that the cooperation was small. About ten percent supported the Nazi party. Nevertheless, there was a hostile relationship, with an occupation force of almost one German for every ten Norwegians.

Denmark and Norway were also unlike in their cooperation with Germany's genocidal policy. Norwegian police, controlled by the Quisling government, aided in the capture of Norwegian Jews in 1942. However, brave Norwegians managed to save over half of the Jewish population from Nazi death camps and help them to escape to safety in Sweden, even though they ran the risk of being severely punished for aiding Jews. The Danish Jews avoided German persecution until 1943, and Denmark was thus better prepared when the Germans struck. Danes were notable for their devoted efforts to protect Danish Jews. More than 96% of the Jewish population was boated to safety in Sweden, while others found refuge with Christian Danish families and organizations.

Alone out of the three Scandinavian countries, Sweden was not invaded and remained nominally neutral during the war. They successfully cultivated peace with the Germans, supplying them with needed raw materials. The Swedish government was very careful to avoid inflaming the Nazis, going so far as to persuade newspaper editors to censor articles, and letting the Nazis move supplies through Sweden and into Norway all the way up to 1943. However, they would occasionally aid the Allies. They granted the Jews that escaped from Denmark asylum and gave notable aid to Finland during the Winter War.

=== Post-war ===
After the war, all of the Scandinavian countries agreed that some form of mutual defense policy was necessary. They began to discuss a Scandinavian defence union. The three Scandinavian countries would, if they had entered into an alliance, have remained separate sovereign countries but acted as a single bloc in foreign policy and security issues. The proposed union was being discussed by a joint Scandinavian committee during the winter of 1948–1949, but the Cold War tension between the United States and the Soviet Union, and preparations for a western alliance that would result in the North Atlantic Treaty overshadowed the effort. When it became known that the western alliance would not be able to supply the Scandinavian countries with armaments before meeting their own pressing needs, this issue ultimately proved to be the turning point for Norway, which resigned from the talks. Denmark was still willing to enter into an alliance with Sweden, but the Swedes saw few advantages in this and the proposal fell. Norway and Denmark subsequently became signatory parties of the North Atlantic Treaty and members of NATO. Sweden remained neutral after a heated debate, but eventually joined on 7 March 2024, following the Russian invasion of Ukraine.

=== European integration ===
The Nordic countries established the Nordic Council in 1952 and the Nordic passport union two years later. After a 1972 referendum, Denmark became the first Scandinavian member of the European Economic Community, which later paved the way for the EU, in 1973. Sweden joined the EU in 1995; after the fall of the Soviet Union, Sweden felt it could do so without being provocative. Norway remains outside the European Union to this day after referendums on membership in 1972 and 1994, although it is a signatory of the Schengen treaty and a member of the European Economic Area. None of the Scandinavian countries (except Finland) have joined the Euro, membership being rejected by referendum in both Denmark and Sweden. Denmark voted no to the Maastricht Treaty in 1992, but reversed the decision after negotiating opt-outs.

== See also ==
- Baltic states
- Baltoscandia
- History of Denmark
- History of Finland
- History of Iceland
- History of Norway
- History of Sweden
- Nordic-Baltic Eight

== Notes ==
=== Sources ===
- Barford, Paul M (2001). The Early Slavs: Culture and Society in Early Medieval Eastern Europe. Cornell University Press. ISBN 978-0-8014-3977-3.
