= Origins of the Sámi =

Earliest phase in Sámi history

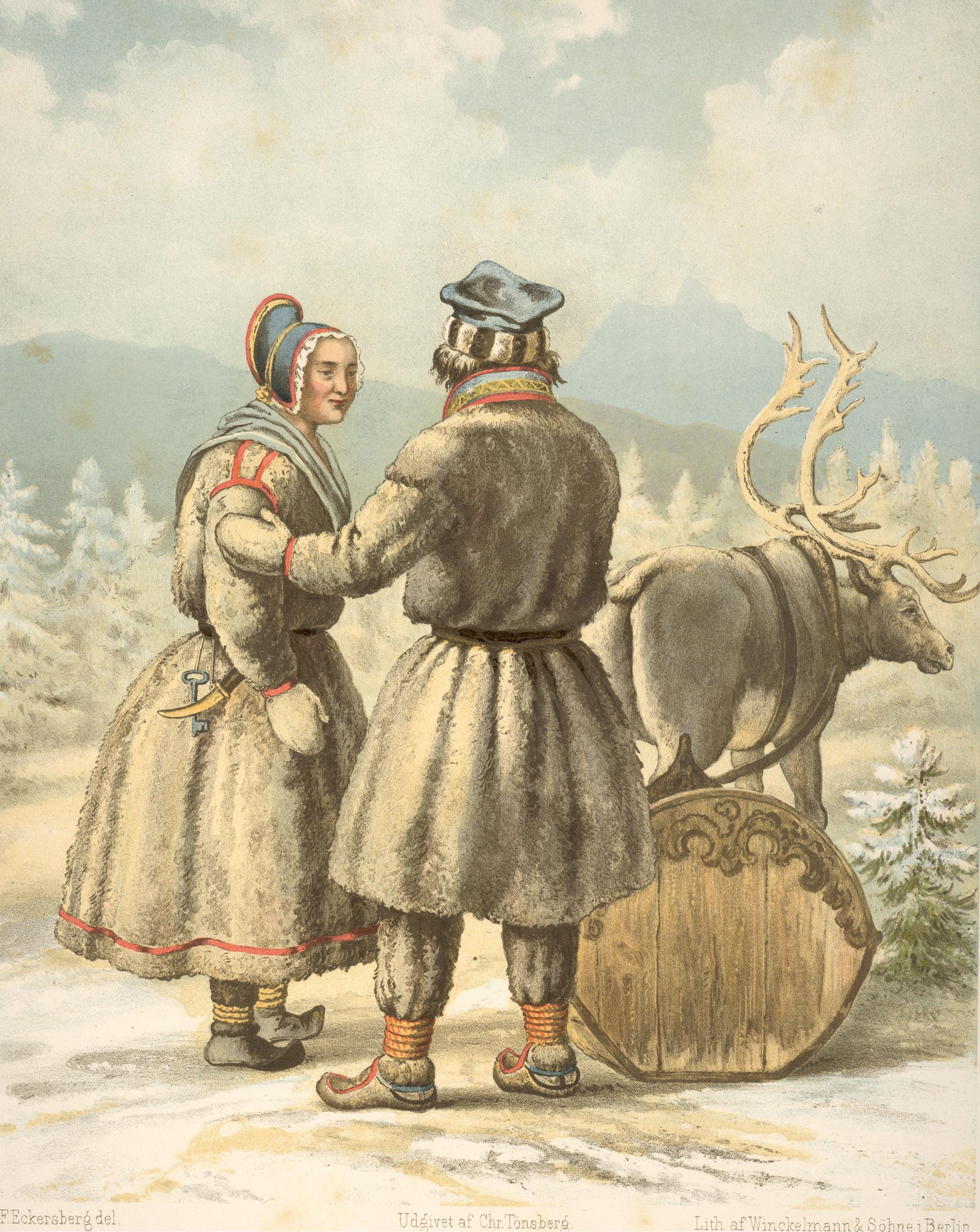
Sámi people from Karasjok painted by Johan Fredrik Eckersberg in 1852.

The origin of the Sámi has been of research interest since at least the early 17th century. Initially, the Sámi were grouped together with ethnic Finns, due to the relative similarity between the Sámi languages and Finnish. When biological anthropology was developed in the 19th century, Sámi were seen instead to differ from surrounding peoples, which in turn led to the theory that the Sámi had developed as an isolated people during the Ice Age, when they would have overwintered by the Arctic Ocean. This theory was eventually abandoned.

== Prehistory ==
New genetic research shows that the Sámi group has developed from several different directions at different times from many different hunter-gatherer peoples who moved across the Cap of the North, and that Sámi as well as Finnish-speaking and Scandinavian language-speaking farmers could mix with each other during the iron age. This has been interpreted to show that the Sámi culture has been so formed as a result of semi-nomadic reindeer husbandry which began around 2500 years ago, rather than as a strictly isolated group. Nevertheless, the Sámi are a genetically unique population. By this it is meant not that the Sámi have unique genes, rather that certain gene variants are present at a different frequency in Sámi people than in other populations.

Europe has been populated by four prehistoric waves of migration, of which the first three waves helped form the Germanic and Nordic peoples, whilst a great deal of the Sámi and Finnish population have their roots in the fourth wave.

The first wave consisted of hunter-gatherers. A culture which is believed to have overwintered the Ice Age in the refugium of Southern Europe reached Scandinavia from the South 13000 years ago. Traces of them appear in the Nordic population as mtDNA Haplogroup V (passed on via one's maternal grandmother's mother etc.), which is particularly common among the Sámi. Another culture had overwintered in refugia in present-day Russia, and populated Scandinavia and Europe from the northeast after the end of the Ice Age, around 10000 years ago. This migration brought with it the mtDNA Haplogroup U5, which is particularly common among Sámi-speaking populations. These days it is uncommon among other European populations, where hunter-gatherers are thought to have been displaced by later farming communities to the areas on Europe's periphery. Variant U5b1b1 appears in the Nordic countries largely only among those with Sámi roots, but also occurs in North Africa (among Berbers), in Northernmost Asia and in Southern Europe.

A second wave of immigration from outside of Europe consisted of Stone Age farmers from the Middle East, and a third wave consisted of Indo-European herders from the Eurasian Steppe, just before Bronze Age.

A fourth wave, from Siberia, reached Europe c.4000 years ago, constituting a significant addition to finns and Sámi. The YDNA haplogroup (inherited from father to son etc.) N1c is especially common in Finland and among the Sámi, and is thought to have arrived in Fennoscandia from the east at least 1500 years ago. The N1c population brought with it metalwork from the Ananyino Culture, resulting in what is believed to be early Sámi metalwork using asbestos-ceramic, in Norrland and other areas.

During the 6th century, humans from the coastal tracts of Finland as well as central Sweden, mostly belonging to YDNA Haplogroups I1 and R1a which commonly occur among farmers, made contact with the Sámi. The Sámi numbered very few at that time, and were therefore threatened by the bottleneck effect, which resulted in uniquely autosomal DNA and an abnormal frequency of haplogroups, but the Sámi traded and, in time, mixed with the resident population of northern Fennoscandia, not least with the Proto-Germanic populations who began the colonisation of central Norrland in the Bronze Age, and northern Norrland since the Middle Ages. Among Swedes, those from Västerbotten show a somewhat higher frequency of haplogroups commonly found among speakers of Sámi and Finnish languages, and the population in Norrland shows more variety than other Germanic population groups.

== Original inhabitants or Finns? ==
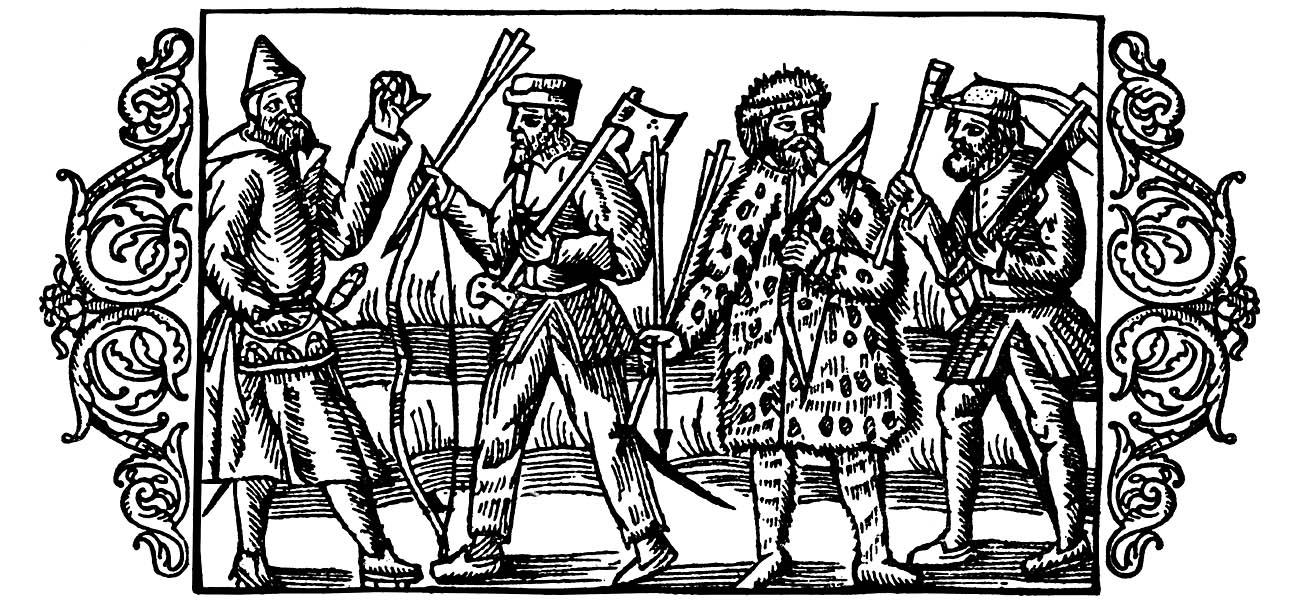
A woodcarving from Olaus Magnus' A Description of the Northern Peoples depicts the different peoples of the Nordic region in the form of a Muscovite, a Finn, a Sámi and a Geat.

According to Sámi tradition expressed by Johan Turi, the Sámi have always lived in Lappland, and did not arrive there from anywhere else. However, the origin of the Sámi has long been a matter of debate. In his book, Lapponia, from 1673, Johannes Schefferus devoted a chapter to the lineage of the Sámi. He opened by arguing at the Sámi couldn't originate from Swedes, "... When nothing is more unlike than a Lapp and a Swede. Not in body shape, temperament, clothing, why nothing between them is alike." Nor were they believed to have come from the Russians or the Norwegians. Schefferus concluded that it was most likely that the Sámi derived from the Finns, not least due to the apparent similarity between the Sámi and Finnish languages, but also as both peoples were so alike in temperament as well as appearance: "The Finns have black hair, wide faces and grim expressions, as do the Lapps". As well as question of clothing, Schefferus found that the difference between the Sámi and the Finns was insignificant.

== K.B. Wiklund's overwintering theory ==
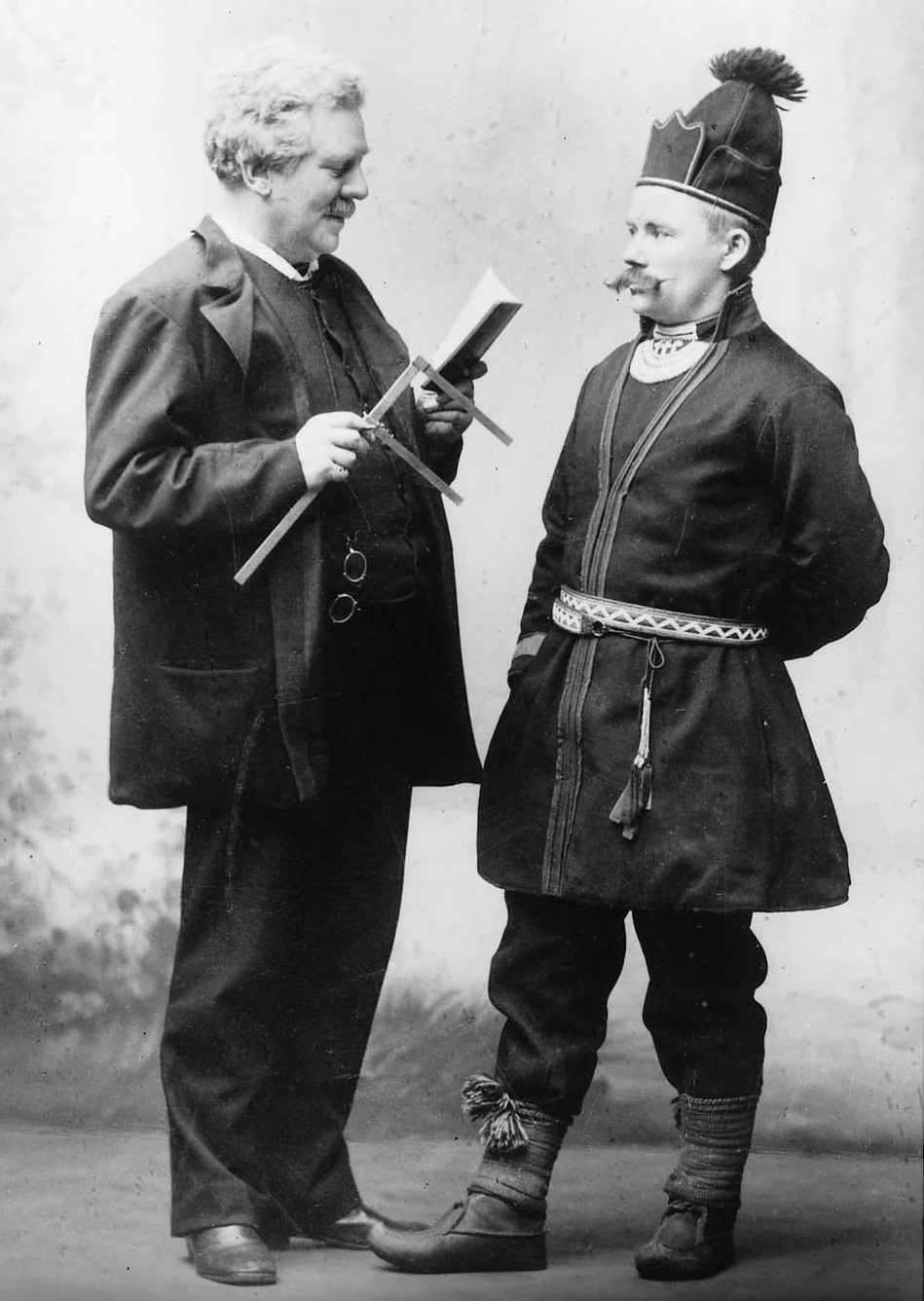
Taking different body measurements, in particular the size of the skull, was the basis for the late 19th century and early 20th century's physical anthropology. Here, Gustaf Retzius is taking the measurements of the Sámi man Fjellstedt from Härjedalen.

Not everyone agreed, however, on the physical similarities between the Sámi and the Finns. At the turn of the 20th century, the linguist K.B. Wiklund stated that the Sámi "are in anthropological regards just as removed from the Finns as ever from the Nordic people". (Wiklund meant in terms of physical anthropology, that is the study of phenotypic traits, which at the time was a large area of research). According to Wiklund, it was characteristic for the Sámi to have a short head and to be of short stature, to have black hair, brown eyes and a weak chin. In his opinion, nobody had been able to prove an anthropological relationship between the Sámi and any other people. He concluded that "the Lappish race" arose through a long time of total isolation from other groups of people.

When the botanist Rolf Nordhagen realised that he could show that relatively large parts of the Norwegian Arctic and Atlantic coasts were ice-free during the last Ice Age, this dovetailed remarkably with Wiklunds theory. Archaeologist Anders Nummedal had also found very old dwellings at Gurravárri in Áltá, in precisely the area Nordhagen had identified as having been ice-free. Thus Wiklund was finally able to solve "the mystery of the Lappish prehistory". The relics of the Komsa culture had to be traces of the Sámi people's forefathers, who spent the Ice Age in isolation by the coast. From there they would have spread further south as the ice melted.

As further evidence for this overwintering theory, K.B Wiklund pointed out that the modern population in Møre district and Sunnfjord in Norway were of an "anthropological type" which were astoundingly similar to the Sámi people, and that archaeologists in precisely this area had found relics of the so-called Fosna culture, which strongly resembled the Komsa culture. Wiklund argued that this was no mere coincidence. Even the so-called "pyttar" of Bohus-Malmön on the edge of the west coast of Sweden betrayed, according to Wiklund, "an unmistakable similarity to our Lapps". Wiklund claimed that right up to modern times there would have been relicts along the Norwegian and Swedish coasts of a population who survived the Ice Age.

K.B. Wiklund believed that the forefathers of the Sámi, who had overwintered on the Arctic coast, wouldn't have spoken Sámi, rather they would have spoken several unknown languages which he called "Paleo-Laplandic". He thought he found lingering traces of Paleo-Laplandic in the form of words which couldn't be attributed to other languages. For example, this included the Sámi word for water, čáhci, which is totally unlike Finnish vesi. The place-name Luleå was, according to Wiklund's understanding, also a Paleo-Laplandic relic. As it can be interpreted as "the watercourse that lies east of and underneath the mountain range" he argued that it seemed to have come from the west. Many other place names in Lappmarken, such as Sulitelma and Abisko, could, according to Wiklund, be relics from the Paleo-Laplandic era. Only later did the Sámi switch from speaking their original language to a Finno-Ugric language.

It ought to be noted that K.B. Wiklund's discourse about "the Lappish race" soon came to be considered outdated. As early as 1941 the physician Gunnar Dahlberg wrote that the thought "that Europeans originate from a number of pure races is an unsubstantiated hypothesis". Despite he himself working with the State Institute for Racial Biology, he drew the conclusion "racial biology [is] an expression of national prejudices and has nothing to do with science". According to Dahlberg, the differences between the Sámi and others probably depended on environmental factors.

== Relations with elk-hunters and asbestos-ceramicists. ==
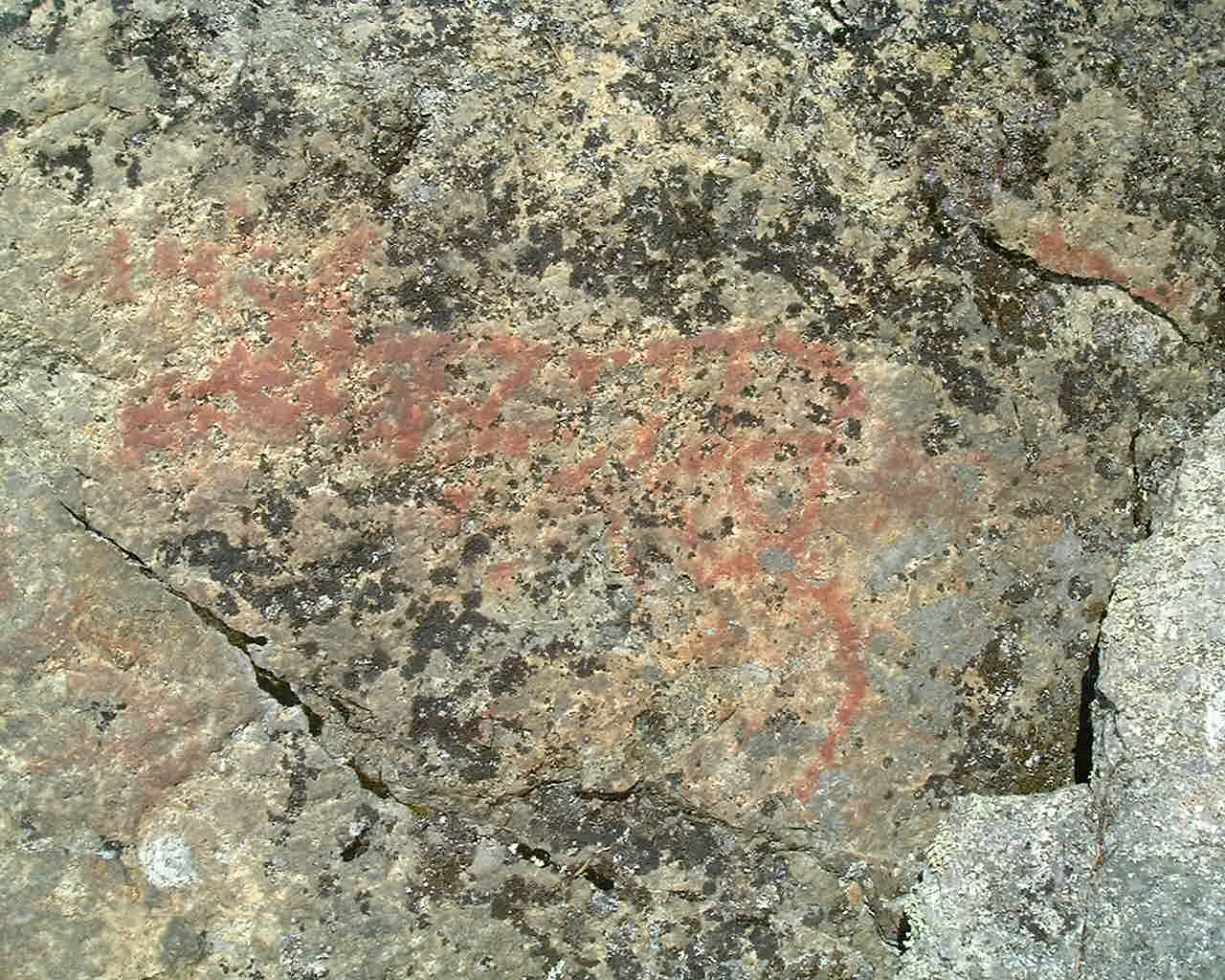
Mellannorrlands The elk-hunters of central Norrland depicted their favourite hunting prey in rock paintings, such as this example at Fångsjön in Jämtland.

Nor did K.B. Wiklund's opinions last long. Only a few decades after his death, most researchers had abandoned the overwintering theory. The concept of the Paleo-Laplandic language, however, lived on to a certain extent. The ethnologist Phebe Fjellström pointed out in the 1980s the considerable differences between Northern Sámi and Southern Sámi and thought the ethnic group of the Sámi actually consisted of two different peoples. The first is suspected to have lived on the Norwegian coast after the Ice Age, and from there traversed the Scandinavian Mountains to Lapland and northern Ångermanland where they then existed as elk-hunters from 4000 BCE onwards. This group would have spoken Paleo-Laplandic. Around 2000 BCE a finno-ugric speaking people, the asbestos-ceramic culture, would have come to Fennoscandia from the east. When the two groups met, it is thought they may have merged into a single ethnic group which became the Sámi.

Even scientists who do not support the idea of a double origin have connected the Sámi to the people of the asbestos-ceramic culture. In Sweden this type of discovery does not occur south of a boundary line which separates Upper Norrland from Central Norrland and Jämtland. North of this boundary the names for rivers and the oldest place names are often of Sámi or Finnish origin, while the equivalent names south of the boundary are Germanic in their origin. The people who made asbestos-ceramics would, according to this, be the forefathers of the Sámi, while those who lived further south would be the forefathers to the Scandinavians.

== Genetic studies ==
When the father of physical anthropology, Johann Friedrich Blumenbach (1752-1840) categorised humans into five separate races, he placed all those who spoke Finno-Ugric languages into the Mongoloid race. Despite K.B. Wiklund's understanding that the Sámi were just as different from the Finns as from the Scandinavians, this classification remained long into the 1900s.

When genetics was developed as a science in the mid-1950s, it became a tool in the research into the origin of the Sámi, and the results suggested that K.B. Wiklund had come closer to the truth than Blumenbach. Lars Beckman, who primarily studied blood types, called the Sámi a genetically unique population. His research indicated that the Sámi were not closely related to Asiatic-Mongoloid ethnicities. However, his studies could not explain the origin of the Sámi, but he did exclude the idea that their "urheimat" was somewhere in Asia or Eastern Europe. His studies of the frequency of so-called Sámi marker-genes indicated that between a quarter and a third of the genetic material of the populations of Västerbotten county and Norrbotten county have Sámi origins.

== Studies of mitochondria and Y-chromosomes ==
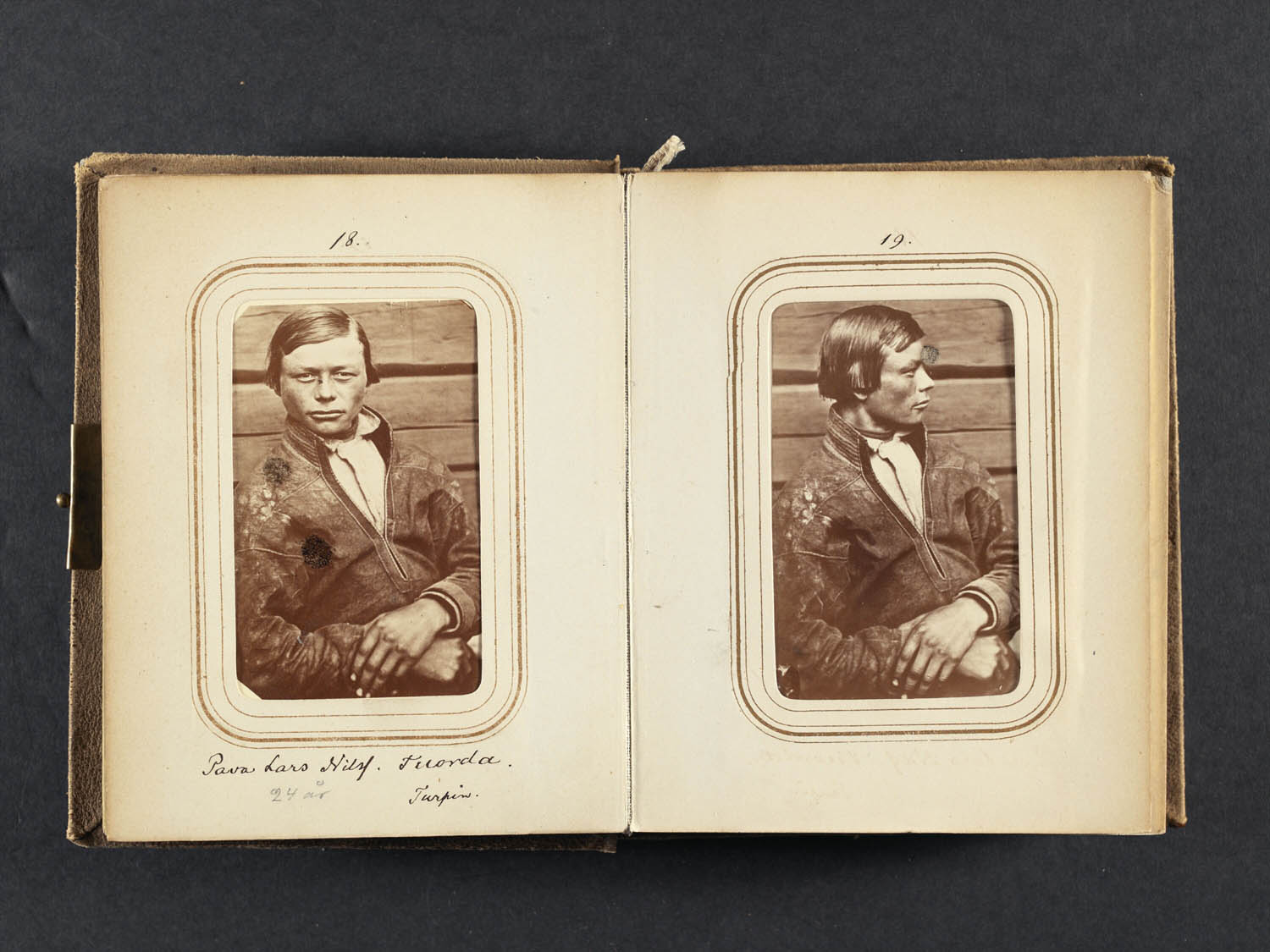
Sámi peoples also stand out as a distinctive people for modern geneticists. Here, Pavva Lars Nilsson Tuorda from Tuorpon siida in Jokkmokk parish, is depicted, photographed by Lotten von Düben in 1868.

Later types of genetic study, particularly of mitochondrial DNA (which is only passed down by the mother) and Y chromosomes (which are only inherited from father to son) have provided new information, yet it can often be difficult to interpret. The two types of mitochondrial DNA which are dominant among the Sámi, haplogroups U5b1b and V, are believed to originate in Western Europe. Even those Y chromosome variants which are found among the Sámi indicate a European origin. However, no genetic similarity with present-day Siberian peoples has been proved. The research group who published these results in 2004 believed that the distinctive genetic character of the Sámi is best explained by their ancestors having been a small, defined group of Europeans.

It has, however, clearly been demonstrated that there is a genetic relationship to Siberia, insofar as nowhere except north-easternmost Europe and northernmost Scandinavia is there so high a frequency as in western Siberia of a particular genetic marker whose very highest area of frequency is found in the border regions between Europe and Siberia.

While mapping out human mitochondrial DNA in its entirety, one of the aforementioned variants, U5b1b, was found in the mitochondrial DNA of three Sámi people, a Berber from Algeria, a Fulani person from Senegal, as well as a Yakut person from northeast Siberia. That the Fulani and Berbers have had contact with each other was already known, but the results were generally a surprise for the research group, particularly that this variant only seems to have emerged 9000 years ago. One possible explanation could be that the forefathers of all of these ethnic groups originated in Southwestern Europe, on the border between France and Spain, from where hunter-gatherer tribes spread out in different directions after the last Ice Age.

A Swedish study from 2007 has concluded that the haplogroups U5b1b and V (those which dominate mitochondrial DNA among Sámi from northernmost Sweden, Norway and Finland) likely came to the area very soon after the Ice Age ended. They may have come either from the European continent, or from the Volga-Ural region of Russia, or from both directions. Another type of mitochondrial DNA, haplogroup Z, occurs at low rates both among Sámi and North Asian ethnicities, yet is otherwise absent from Europe. Researchers have interpreted this as a sign that the North Sámi group mixed with another from the east as recently as 2700 years ago.

== Genetics and archaeology ==
The Swedish genetic study of 2007 can be compared with new archaeological discoveries, which are thought to show that northernmost Sweden was populated from the north immediately after the Ice Age. The Komsa culture has thus become central again as the origin of northern Sweden's earliest inhabitants. Researchers no longer believe, however, that the people who left traces at Komsa lived out the Ice Age on the Northern Norwegian coast, rather that the coastal area was quickly colonised from the south during the final stages of the Ice Age. When these people followed the melting ice southwards across the Tundra, they eventually encountered the people who had colonised Finland from the east. Thus, the genetic heritage of the Sámi, which is primarily European but is thought to have come from both east and west, can be explained.

The time of the later migration, which geneticists believe they can see traces of from 2700 years ago, can be compared with that connection which was made before by many archaeologists between the Sámi and the people who made asbestos ceramics. Asbestos ceramics are found in dwellings from circa 3900 BCE to 1300 BCE in Finland, and from 1500 BCE to 1000 CE in Scandinavia.

One theory on the origin the Sámi was that they originate from the hunter-gatherer culture known by archaeologists as the Pitted Ware culture. However, modern genetic studies have shown this not to be the case.

== See also ==
- Sámi History
- Sápmi
