= Pauler =

Pauler is a surname. Notable people with the surname include:

- Ákos Pauler (1876–1933), Hungarian philosopher
- Ildefons Pauler (1903–1996), Grand Master of the Teutonic Knights
- Tivadar Pauler (1816–1886), Hungarian politician

== See also ==
- Paler
- Paule (name)
