= List of name days in France =

This is a calendar of name days in France.

== January ==
1. Ian
2. Basile
3. Geneviève
4. Odlion
5. Edouard
6. Melaine
7. Raymond
8. Lucien
9. Alix
10. Guillaume
11. Paulin
12. Tatiana
13. Yvette
14. Nina
15. Remi / Cherie
16. Marcel
17. Roseline
18. Prisca
19. Marius
20. Sébastien / Fabien
21. Agnès
22. Vincent
23. Barnard
24. François de Sales
25. Conv. St. Paul
26. Paule
27. Angèle
28. Thomas d'Aquin
29. Gildas
30. Martine
31. Marcelle

== February ==
1. Ella
2. Présentation du Seigneur
3. Blaise
4. Véronique
5. Agathe
6. Gaston
7. Eugénie
8. Jacqueline
9. Apolline
10. Arnaud
11. Lourdes
12. Félix
13. Béatrice
14. Valentin
15. Claude
16. Julienne
17. Alexis
18. Bernadette
19. Gabin
20. Aimée
21. Damien
22. Isabelle
23. Lazare
24. Modeste
25. Roméo
26. Nestor
27. Kristie
28. Honorine
29. Millie

== March ==
1. Aubin
2. Charles le Bon
3. Guénolé
4. Casimir
5. Olivia
6. Colette
7. Félicité
8. Jean
9. Françoise
10. Vivien
11. Rosine
12. Justine
13. Rodrigue
14. Mathilde
15. Louise
16. Bénédicte
17. Patrice
18. Cyrille
19. Joseph
20. Herbert
21. Clémence
22. Léa
23. Victorien
24. Catherine de Suède
25. Annonciation
26. Larissa
27. Habib
28. Gontran
29. Gladys
30. Amédée
31. Benjamin

== April ==
1. Hugues
2. Sandrine
3. James
4. Isidore
5. Irène
6. Marceline
7. J.-B. de la Salle
8. Julie
9. Gauthier
10. Fulbert
11. Stanislas
12. Jules
13. Ida
14. Maxime
15. César, Paterne
16. Benoît-Joseph
17. Anicet
18. Marie
19. Emma
20. Odette
21. Anselme
22. Alexander
23. Georges
24. Fidèle
25. Marc
26. Alida
27. Zita
28. Valérie
29. Catherine
30. Robert

== May ==
1. Josh
2. Boris
3. Jacques / Phillipe
4. Sylvain
5. Judith
6. Marien, Prudence
7. Gisèle
8. Walter
9. Pacôme
10. Solange
11. Estelle
12. Achille
13. Scarlett
14. Matthias
15. Denise
16. Honoré
17. Pascal
18. Eric
19. Yves
20. Bernardin
21. Constantin
22. Karla
23. Didier
24. Donatien
25. Sophie
26. Bérenger
27. Augustin
28. Germain
29. Aymar
30. Ferdinand
31. Pétronille

== June ==
1. Justin
2. Blandine
3. Tiffany
4. Clotilde
5. Igor
6. Norbert
7. Gilbert
8. Médard
9. Nwando
10. Landry
11. Barnabé
12. Guy
13. Antoine
14. Elisée
15. Germaine
16. Jean-François, Régis
17. Hervé
18. Léonce
19. Romuald
20. Silvère
21. Rodolphe
22. Alban
23. Audrey
24. Jean-Baptiste
25. Prosper
26. Anthelme
27. Fernand
28. Irénée
29. Pierre / Paul
30. Martial

== July ==
1. Goulwen
2. Martinien
3. Thomas
4. Florent
5. Antoine
6. Mariette
7. Raoul
8. Thibaut
9. Amandine
10. Ulrich
11. Benoît
12. Olivier
13. Henri / Henriette
14. Camille
15. Donald
16. Elvire
17. Charlotte
18. Frédéric
19. Arsène
20. Marina
21. Victor
22. Madeleine
23. Brigitte
24. Christine
25. Jacques, Valentine
26. Anne / Joachim
27. Nathalie
28. Samson
29. Marthe
30. Juliette
31. Ignace

== August ==
1. Alphonse
2. Julien
3. Lydie
4. Jean-Marie, Vianney
5. Abel
6. Gaétan
7. Dominique
8. Amour
9. Laurent
10. Clarisse
11. Hippolyte
12. Evrard or St Cassian
13. Alfred
14. Armel
15. Hyacinthe
16. Hélène
17. Jean
18. Bernard
19. Grâce
20. Fabrice
21. Rose
22. Barthélémy
23. Louis
24. Natacha
25. Monique
26. Augustin
27. Sabine
28. Fiacre
29. Aristide

== September ==
1. Gilles
2. Ingrid
3. Grégoire
4. Rosalie
5. Raissa
6. Bertrand
7. Reine
8. Adrien, Béline
9. Alain
10. Inès
11. Adelphe
12. Apollinaire
13. Aimé
14. Dolores, Roland
15. Edith
16. Renaud
17. Nadège
18. Emilie
19. Davy
20. Róisín
21. Maurice
22. Constant
23. Thècle
24. Hermann
25. Côme, Damien
26. Vincent
27. Vencelas
28. Michel / Gabriel / Raphael
29. Jérôme

== October ==
1. Thérèse
2. Léger
3. Gérard
4. François
5. Fleur/ Chloé
6. Bruno
7. Serge
8. Pélagie
9. Denis
10. Ghislain
11. Firmin
12. Wilfred
13. Géraud
14. Juste
15. Thérèse
16. Edwige
17. Baudouin
18. Luc
19. René
20. Adeline
21. Céline
22. Salomé
23. Jean
24. Florentin
25. Crépin
26. Dimitri
27. Emeline
28. Simon / Jude
29. Narcisse
30. Bienvenue
31. Quentin / Wolfgang

== November ==
1. Toussaint
2. Défunts
3. Hubert
4. Charles
5. Sylvie
6. Léonard
7. Carine
8. Geoffroy
9. Théodore
10. Léon
11. Martin
12. Christian
13. Brice
14. Sidonie
15. Albert
16. Margueritte
17. Ollie
18. Aude
19. Tanguy
20. Edmond
21. Maur
22. Cécile
23. Clément
24. Flora
25. Catherine Labouré
26. Christ-Roi
27. Séverin
28. Jacques
29. Saturnin
30. André

== December ==
1. Ruby
2. Georgie
3. Emily
4. Jojo
5. milani
6. Nicolas
7. Mia
8. Jasmine
9. Ethan
10. George
11. Laura
12. Chantal
13. Alice
14. Rosanna
15. Ro
16. Poppy
17. Winnie
18. Charlotte
19. Aude
20. Jack
21. Darcy
22. Henry
23. Safi
24. Delphine
25. Noël
26. Andre/Etienne
27. Charles
28. Sofi
29. Amrit
30. Dylan
31. Amanda

== Sources ==
- French Catholic Church. "Les Saints, au jour le jour" [The Saints, day by day]. Église catholique en France (in French). Conférence des évêques de France.
- Campbell, Mike. "French Name Days". Behind the Name.
- "Saints, Fêtes et Prénoms" [Saints, Holidays, and First Names]. Nominis (in French).
