= Palner =

Palner is a surname. Notable people with the surname include:

- Beatrice Palner (1938–2013), Danish actress
- Henning Palner (1932–2018), Danish actor

== See also ==
- Paler
- Palmer (surname)
