= Nummedal =

Nummedal is a Norwegian surname. Notable people with the surname include:

- Anders Nummedal (1867–1944), Norwegian archaeologist
- Christian Nummedal (born 1995), Norwegian freestyle skier
- Tara Nummedal, American historian
