= Fjellström =

Fjellström is a surname. Notable people with the surname include:

- Emil Fjellström (1884–1944), Swedish actor
- Jens Fjellström (born 1966), Swedish footballer
- Phebe Fjellström (1924–2007), Swedish ethnologist
