= White birch (disambiguation) =

White birch is a common name for Betula papyrifera, a species of tree native to northern North America.

White birch may also refer to:

== Trees ==
- Betula pubescens (Betula alba), European white birch, downy birch
- Betula pendula, silver birch, warty birch, European white birch

== Other uses ==
- White Birch, Edmonton, Alberta, Canada
- White Birch Village, a resort in Wisconsin
- The White Birch (band), Norwegian recording artists
- The White Birch (album), a 1994 album by Codeine
- Shirakabaha (Japanese: 白樺派, literally "White Birch Society"), a Japanese literary group
