= Anders Nummedal =

Norwegian archaeologist (1867–1944)

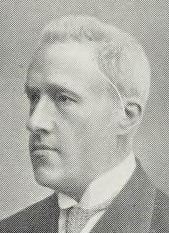
- Born: January 27, 1867; Vik, Norway
- Died: March 6, 1944 (aged 77); Oslo, Norway
- Occupation: Archaeologist

Anders Johnsen Nummedal (January 27, 1867 – March 6, 1944) was a Norwegian archaeologist. He is known for discovering the Fosna culture.

Nummedal was educated as a geologist, and in 1909 he was employed as a teacher at Kristiansund High School (Norwegian: Kristiansund høyere almenskole) when he found traces of people living on the Norwegian coast approximately 8,000 years ago. Nummedal found these settlements from the Fosna culture while he was studying the shorelines and post-glacial rebound during the time after the last ice age. The first discovery was made at Lake Voll (Vollvatnet) on the island of Nordlandet in Kristiansund. Later he found a number of Fosna culture sites elsewhere in Western Norway and Southern Norway.

Nummedal was named a government scholar in 1917, and he was associated with the University Collection of Antiquities in Oslo as a conservator. In 1925 he found the first traces of a similar Stone Age culture in Northern Norway. It was named the Komsa culture after Mount Komsa, close to where the first discovery was made.

Nummedal was a member of the Norwegian Academy of Science and Letters, and in 1936 he was named a knight first class of the Order of St. Olav.
