= Paler =

Paler is a surname. Notable people with the surname include:

- Binyomin Paler (1908–2000), Haredi rosh yeshiva and Talmudist in the United States
- Octavian Paler (1926–2007), Romanian writer, journalist, and politician
