= Binyomin Paler =

Rabbi Binyomin Paler (Hebrew: בנימין פלר; 1908 – August 6, 2000) was a Haredi rosh yeshiva and Talmudist who is regarded as one of those who brought the Brisk yeshivas and methods from Europe to the United States.

He was considered one of the closest students of Rabbi Yitzchok Zev Soloveitchik (the Brisker Rov.)

He was born in Brest, Belarus, then in Russia, to his father, Rabbi Yitzchok Paler. The family claimed descent from such Torah authorities as Rabbi Moses Isserles and Rabbi Meir ben Isaac Katzenellenbogen. Rabbi Yitzchok Paler, a full-time Talmudic scholar, was so well respected in the community of Brest that when the Brisker Rov was not available to serve as a Sandek at a Bris, Rabbi Yitzchok Paler served in that capacity instead.

As a child, Rabbi Binyomin Paler gained a reputation as a child prodigy. He originally learned in the yeshiva in Brisk headed by Moshe Sokolowsky, author of Imrei Moshe. As he matured, he was allowed to join a small circle of select individuals who had the privilege to learn directly with the Brisker Rov. Even during World War II, Rabbi Binyomin Paler did not leave his beloved teacher, the Brisker Rov, rather, he followed the latter to Vilna to continue his studies.

While learning in Brest, Rabbi Binyomin Paler's study partner was Rabbi Berel Soloveitchik. The duo learned eight folios of the Talmud every day. Rabbi Paler was reputed to have learned the entire Nezikin in one winter semester. He was also reputed to have been an expert in the all works of Maimonides and memorized the latter's works as well as the entire Gemara.

Eventually, Rabbi Binyomin Paler joined the Mirrer yeshiva and escaped the horrors of the Holocaust in Europe by finding refuge with the Yeshiva in Shanghai.

After the war, Rabbi Binyomin Paler joined his friend Rabbi Aryeh Leib Malin from the Mir in establishing Yeshivas Beis HaTalmud in Brooklyn, New York. The next year, he was appointed as a lecturer in Yeshivas Chasan Sofer, the yeshiva headed by his father-in-law, Rabbi Shmuel Ehrenfeld, the Mattesdorfer Rov. Rabbi Binyomin Paler eventually became the Rosh Yeshiva in his father-in-law's yeshiva.

In America, Rabbi Paler was the emissary of the Brisker Rov in terms of funds needed for the various yeshivas in Israel, especially in Jerusalem. He also helped transmit the Brisker tradition to America.

In 1965 he left Chasan Sofer to open his own yeshiva, Yeshiva Mekor Chaim. The name of his Yeshiva was given by Rabbi Moshe Feinstein to show that Rabbi Binyamin Paler was continuing the Talmudic tradition established by Rabbi Chaim Brisker. In 1976, a high school attached to the yeshiva was opened. Following his death, Rabbi Paler was succeeded as dean of Mekor Chaim by his three sons, Rabbi Yitzchok (died 2020), Rabbi Simcha Bunim and Rabbi Zecharia. His son-in-law, HaRav Shmuel Abba Olshin, is the Rosh Yeshiva of Yeshiva Eitz Chaim of Hillside.

Rabbi Paler's wife, Rebbetzin Esther, died in August 2026.

== Sources ==
- Transmitting The Legacy Of Brisk: A Tribute To HaRav Binyomin Paler zt'l
