= Komsafjellet =

Mountain in Finnmark, Norway

Coordinates: 69°59′03″N 23°17′02″E

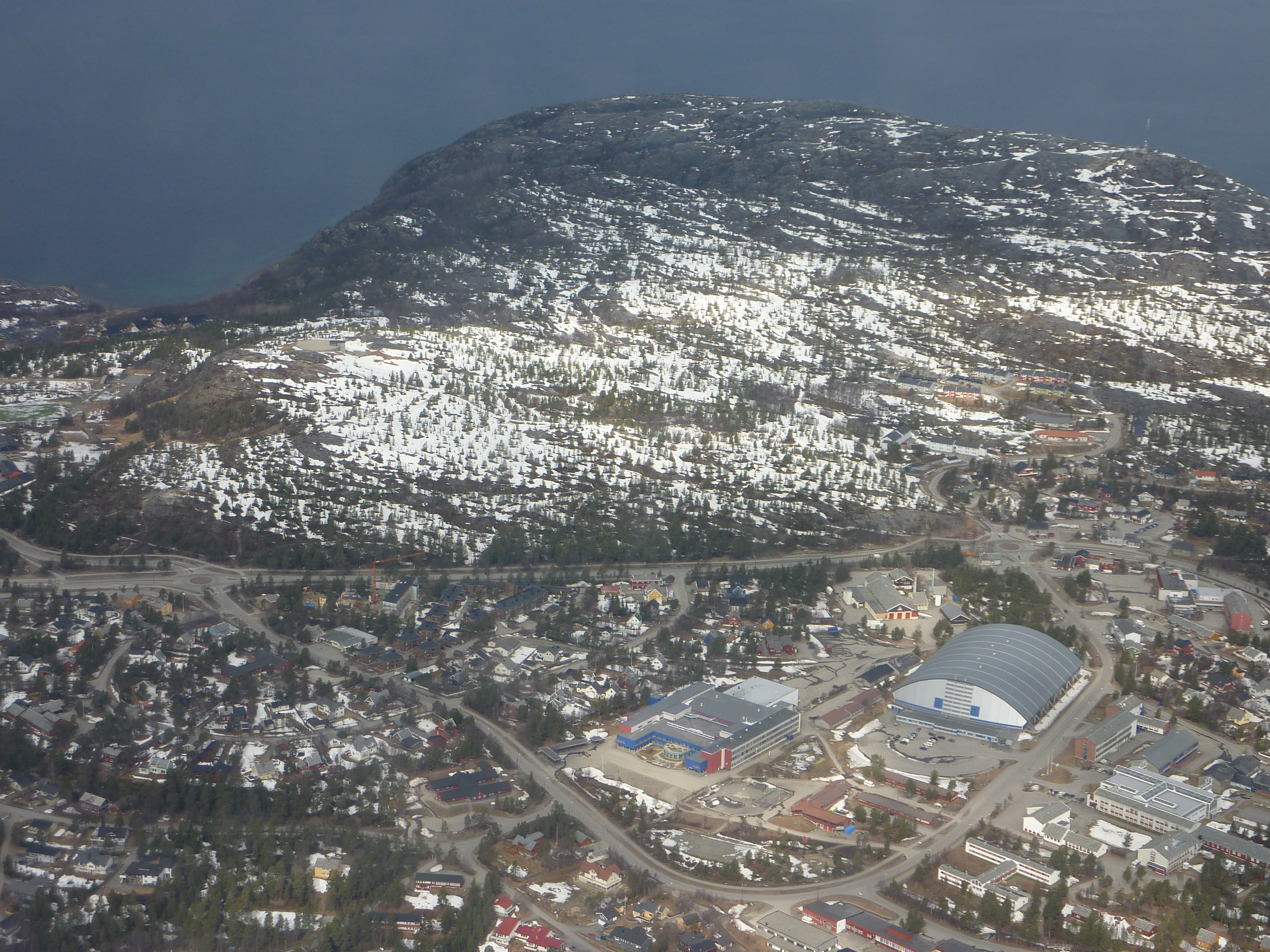
View of Komsafjellet.

Komsafjellet (Northern Sami: Gurravárri) is a mountain in Alta Municipality in Finnmark county, Norway. The area has given its name to the so-called Komsa culture when in 1925, archaeological finds from the Stone Age were made in the mountains. The oldest finds have been dated to 8000–7000 BC. The mountain is close to the town of Alta, and the mountain's name Komsa is actively used in naming in Alta.

== History ==
The name Komsafjellet comes as a simplification of the former name Kongshavnfjell. Old maps showing today's Komsafjell showed the mountain under the name Kongshavnfjell, and the Sami name for the mountain is Gurravárri.

In 1925, archaeologist Anders Nummedal made large Stone Age finds in the area. Later, more finds were found, and the area gave its name to the so-called Komsa culture. In 2000, new finds of petroglyphs were also made. On the northwest side of the mountain, there is also a 5-meter old Sami sacrificial stone, Áhkku as it is called in Sami. The Coastal Sami used to sacrifice fish and fish fat to the stone.
