= White Birch Village =

Coordinates: 46.0709°N 89.5336°W

White Birch Village is a vacation resort located in Boulder Junction, Wisconsin.

== History from the White Birch Village website ==
Asa Burton Cooley created the White Birch Resort Company in 1922. Between 1922 and 1928 the White Birch Resort Company was sold and reclaimed to 4 different owners. Five or six cabins were on the property by 1931. In 1941 the resort was sold to Pat and Kelly Wilsie. The resort was renamed Wilsie’s White Birch Lodge. In 1947 highline electric power arrives. Prior to this date the resort had 5 generators that powered the lodge. The resort is sold to Fred and Arlene Dreyfus in 1963 and then to Carol and Dick Malmgren in 1981. In 1982 the Malmgrens rename the resort White Birch Village. The restaurant was closed down and full kitchens are built in all the units to become a full housekeeping resort. In 2006, the resort was passed on to the Malmgren's daughter (Sue) and her husband, John Altschwager.

== Inaccurate prior History ==
White Birch Village was originally known as White Birch Lodge, and only consisted of the main lodge that still stands on the Lake. It was purchased by Carol and Dick Malmgren in 1981, who added most of the modern lodgings and improvements to the resort. In 1992 they purchased the former Aqualand Zoo property to expand the resort. They passed the resort onto their daughter, Sue, and her husband John Altshwager in 2006.

== Location ==
White Birch Village is located East of Highway K in Boulder Junction, Wisconsin on White Birch Lake. White Birch Lake is connected to Ballard and Irving lakes through a shallow channel. White Birch Lake is also known for being a small, uncrowded fishing lake. White Birch Village and 2 other properties are the only properties on the lake, and the other 80% is state forest. White Birch Lake spans a total of 113 acres and has a maximum depth of 27 feet.

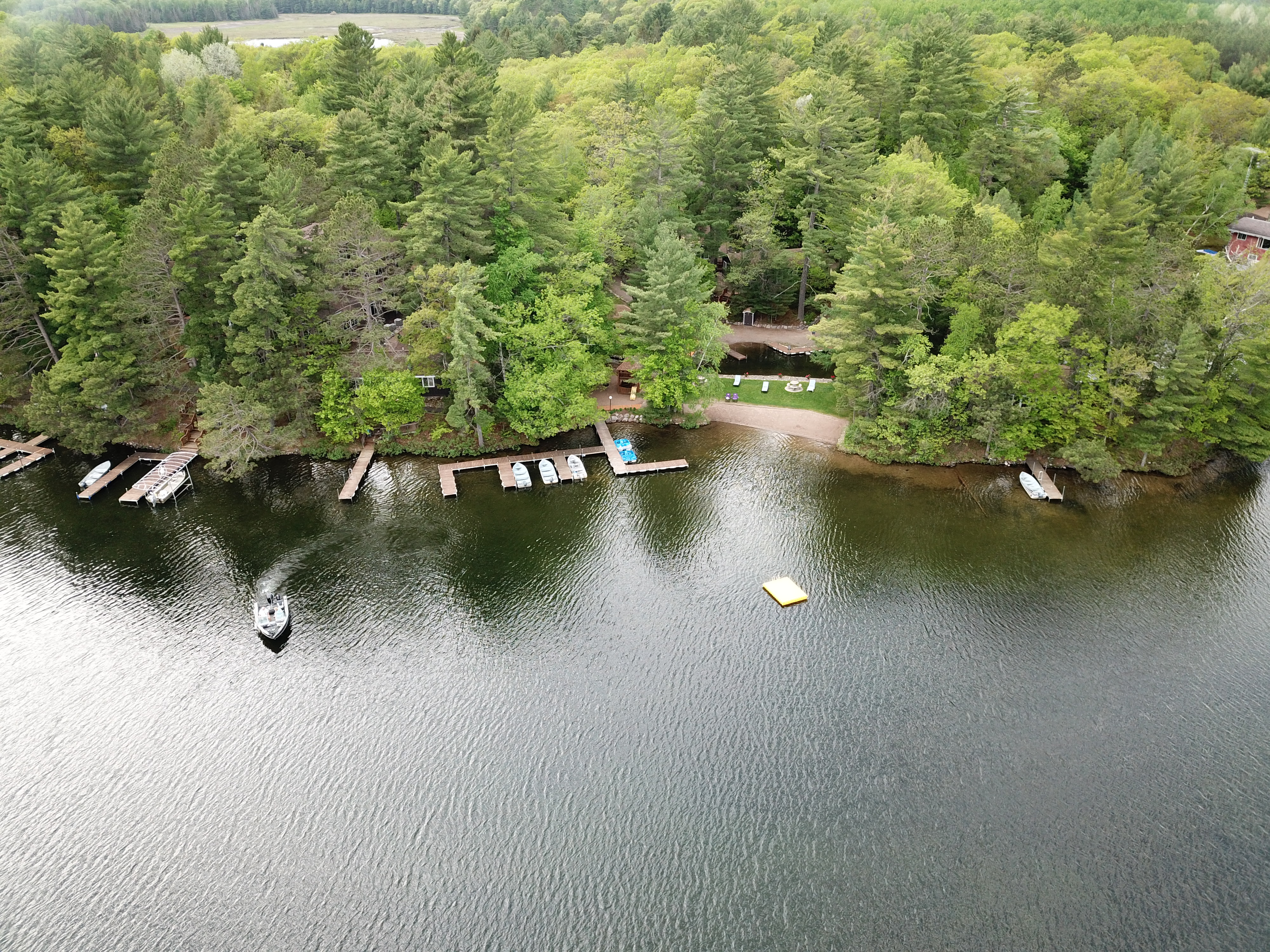

== Fishing ==
White Birch Lake is very well known for its fishing. It is mostly fished for muskellunge (a.k.a. Musky). The lake also contains most panfish, walleye, northern pike, largemouth bass, and smallmouth bass.

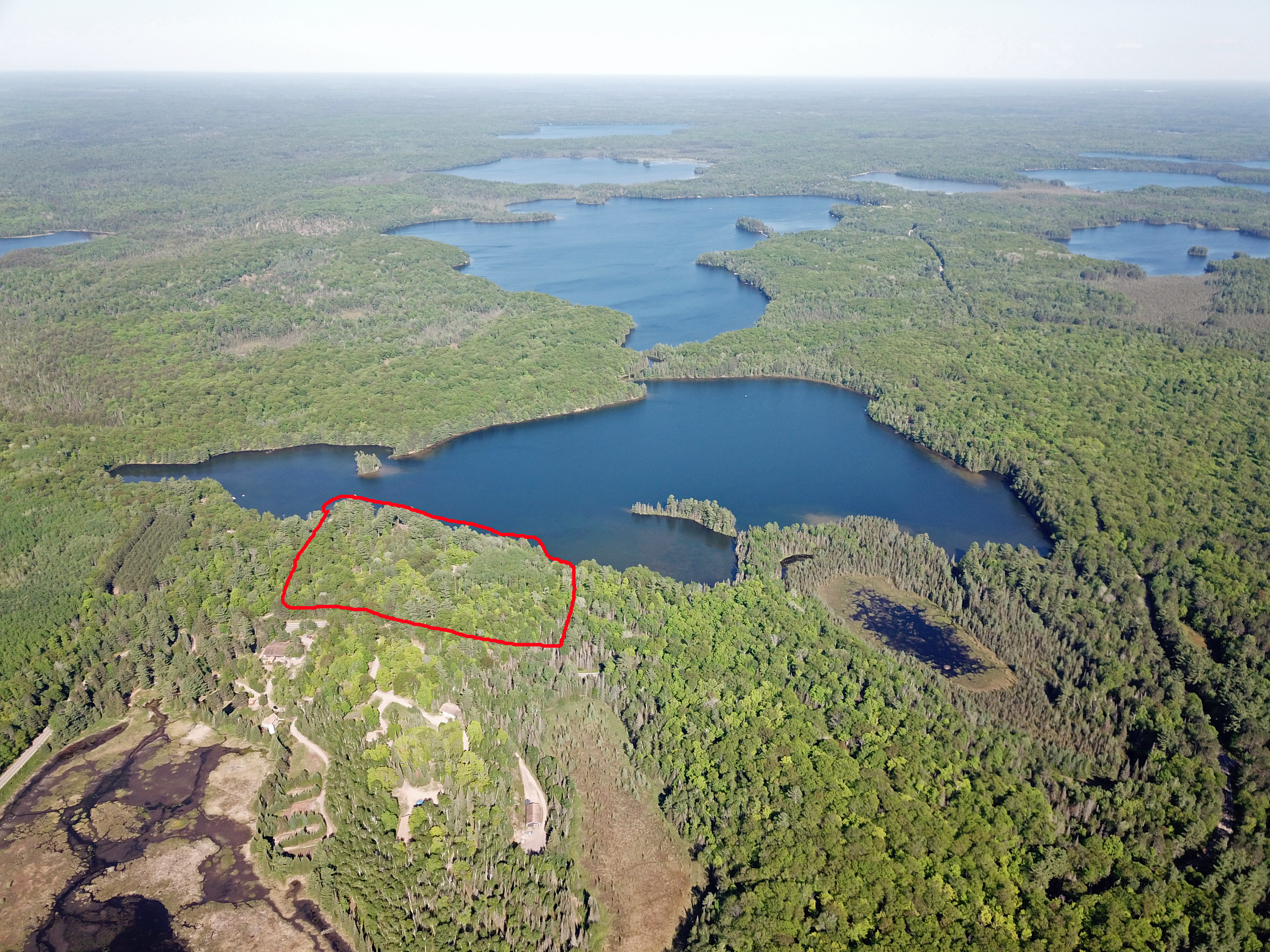

== Lodgings ==
White Birch Village has 18 vacation homes available for renting on a weekly basis. All of these homes have full kitchens, baths, central heating, and grills. The units are

- Woodside
- Hillcrest
- Bluebill
- Wren
- RedOaks
- Balsim Fir
- Hideaway
- Oriole
- WoodDuck
- Teal
- Musky
- Mallard
- Loon
- The Barn
- Timberwolfe
- Cattail
- Heron Haus
- The Lodge Suites
