= Paule (name) =

Paule is both a feminine given name and a surname. Notable people with the name include:

Given name:

- Paule Andral (1879–1956), French actress
- Paule Baillargeon (born 1945), Canadian actress and film director
- Paule Baudouin (born 1984), French handball player
- Paule Brunelle (born 1953), Canadian politician
- Paule Constable, British lighting designer
- Paule Constant (born 1944), French novelist
- Paule Desjardins, French singer
- Paule Gauthier (c.1943–2016), Canadian lawyer
- Paule Herreman (1919–1991), Belgian actress and television presenter
- Paule Marrot (1902–1987), French textile designer
- Paule Marshall (1929–2019), American novelist (born Valenza Pauline Burke)
- Paule Maurice (1910–1967), French composer
- Paule Mink (1839–1901), French feminist and socialist
- Paule Vézelay (1892–1984), British painter
- Paule du Bouchet (born 1951), French writer and novelist

Surname:

- Paule (surname)
