= Paule (surname) =

Paule is a surname, and may refer to:

- Allan Paule (born 1963), Filipino actor
- Antoine de Paule (c.1551–1636), French Grandmaster of the Order of Saint John
- Anthony Paule (born 1956), American blues guitarist and singer
- Camille Paule (1867–1946), French gendarme and consort
- Peter Paule, Austrian mathematician
- Ross Paule (born 1976), American soccer player
- Tove Paule (born 1951), Norwegian sports official
- William Paule (fl.1388), English politician
