= Phebe Fjellström =

Swedish ethnologist (1924–2007)

Phebe Maria Fjellström née Lindgren (1924–2007) was a Swedish ethnologist. She is remembered for her pioneering research into the culture of the Sámi peoples of northern Sweden, including their relationship with those in neighbouring Nordic counties. In particular, she took a special interest in Sámi silverware. She went on to research the Swedish colonization of the San Joaquin Valley in California. In 1981, she was appointed professor of ethnology at Umeå University where she remained until her retirement in 1990, both teaching and undertaking further research.

== Early life, family and education ==
Born in Porjus in the far north of Sweden, Phebe Maria Lindgren was the daughter of the confectioner Per Helmer Lindgren and his wife Valborg Tyra Augusta née Sandberg. After graduating from high school in Luleå in 1943, she studied art history, archaeology and Nordic folklore at Uppsala University, graduating in 1948. That year she married Karl-Erik Johan Fjellström, a fellow student. The couple had three children.

== Career ==
The couple first moved to Boden where she raised a family while her husband worked as a physician. They returned to Uppsala in 1956 where, inspired by her ethnology teacher Åke Campbell, Phebe Fjellström was able to undertake research on Sámi culture. This led in 1962 to her earning a doctorate with a thesis on Sámi silver titled Lapskt silver. Studier över en föremålsgrupp och dess ställning inom lapskt kulturliv (Lapland silver: Studies on a target group and its place within the cultural life of Lapland). Her research examined the connections between the Sámi peoples and their neighbours in the Nordic countries as well as cultural contacts with the rest of Europe. Her approach was based in part on the work of the ethnologist Sigfrid Svensson from Lund who had revealed connections between Scanian and Sámi silver. She embarked on further research into the lives and culture of the Sámi, publishing her findings in 1985 in Samernas samhälle i tradition och nutid (Sámi society in tradition and the present).

As a result of a fellowship awarded to her husband, the couple moved to La Jolla, California in 1966. While there she undertook research on a Swedish community in California which she published in 1970 as Swedish-American colonization in the San Joaquin Valley in California. A study of acculturation and assimilation of an immigrant group.

On returning to Sweden in the late 1960s, Fjellström continued her research in University of Gothenburg and then in Umeå University where in 1981 she was appointed professor of the newly established ethnology department. In addition to her teaching, she focused on culture in northern Scandinavia extending beyond the Sámi. She retired in 1990.

Phebe Fjellström died on 1 February 2007 in Uppsala where she was buried in the Hammarby Cemetery.
