= Fosna–Hensbacka culture =

Late Palaeolithic/early Mesolithic cultures in Scandinavia

- Geographical range: Scandinavia
- Period: Mesolithic
- Dates: c. 8300 BC – c. 7300 BC
- Preceded by: Ahrensburg culture
- Followed by: Nøstvet and Lihult cultures

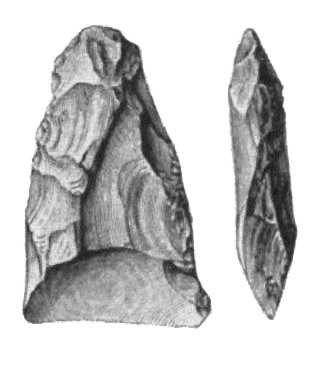
a flake axe Östergötland

The Fosna/Hensbacka (c. 8300 BCE – 7300 BCE, or 12000 cal BP – 10500 cal BP), were two very similar Late Palaeolithic/early Mesolithic cultures in Scandinavia, and are often subsumed under the name Fosna–Hensbacka culture. This complex includes the Komsa culture that, notwithstanding different types of tools, is also considered to be a part of the Fosna culture group. The main difference is that the Fosna/Komsa culture was distributed along the coast of Northern Norway, whereas the Hensbacka culture had a more eastern distribution along the coast of western Sweden; primarily in central Bohuslän to the north of Gothenburg. The Hensbacka culture evolved into the later Sandarna culture which is found along the coast of western Sweden.

Recent investigations indicate that this particular area, i.e. central Bohuslän, may well have had the largest seasonal population in northern Europe during the Late Palaeolithic/early Mesolithic transition. This was due to environmental circumstances brought about by the relationship between the Vänern basin in the east, and topographical features in the North Sea basin to the west.

== Fosna–Hensbacka culture group ==
The name Fosna takes its name from Fosna or Lille-Fosen, the former name of Kristiansund, and it is an umbrella term for the oldest settlements along the Norwegian coast, from Hordaland to Nordland. The oldest settlements in Bohuslän on the Swedish west coast (the Hensbacka), derive from the Ahrensburgian culture group from Northern Germany. The oldest Fosna settlements in Eastern Norway are found at Høgnipen in Østfold. New finds (2008) on Pauler in Larvik Municipality seem to be even older.

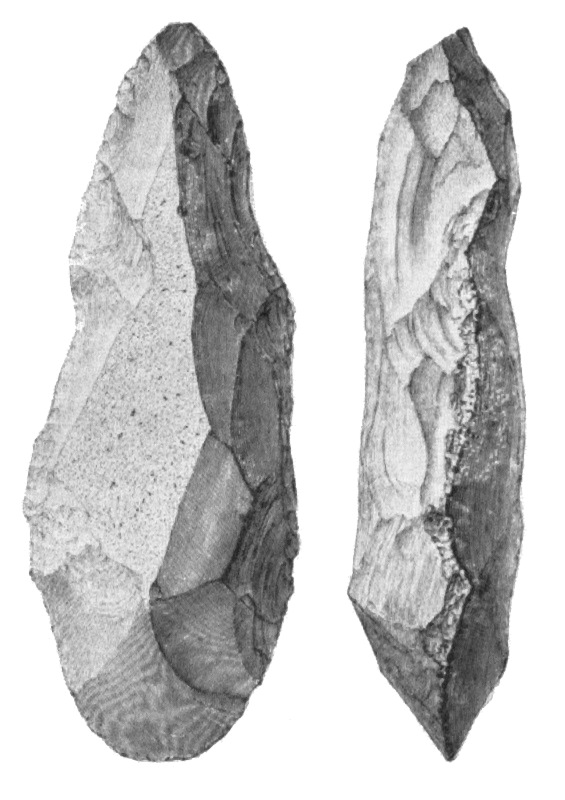
A core axe, from Skåne

The settlements were located close to the contemporary seashore but, due to constant land uplift after deglaciation, they are now 60–70 m above present-day sea level in western Norway, while Høgnipen is as high as 150 m above present-day sea level, the difference being due to the greater crustal rebound on the Baltic side of the Scandinavian Peninsula. Site locations indicate that fishing and seal hunting were important for the economy and it is assumed that hide covered wooden framed boats were used in that the majority of Hensbacka sites (c. 75%) are located on islands in the outer archipelago. The Fosna/Hensbacka culture represent a pure hunter-gatherer culture. On settlements, archaeologists have only found stone tools and the remains of the production of the same. Characteristic tools include flake axes, lanceolates and tanged arrowheads.

== See also ==
- Komsa
- History of Norway
