= Komsa culture =

Mesolithic culture in Norway

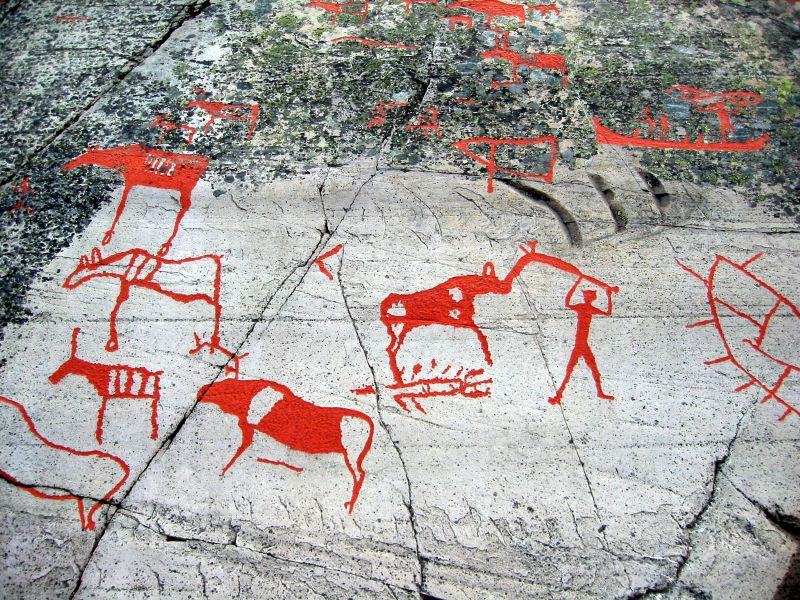
Rock carving petroglyphs at Alta

The Komsa culture (Norwegian: Komsakulturen) was a Mesolithic culture of hunter-gatherers that existed from around 10,000 BC in Northern Norway.

The culture is named after Mount Komsa in the present-day Alta Municipality in Finnmark county, where the remains of the culture were first discovered. The term was first used by the Norwegian archaeologist Anders Nummedal (1867–1944) after the discoveries he made on Mount Komsa in 1925. The distinction between a "Komsa" type of stone-tool culture north of the Arctic Circle and a "Fosna" type from Trøndelag to Oslofjord was rendered obsolete in the 1970s. Nowadays both phenomena are ascribed to different types of tools of the same culture.

Recent archaeological finds from Finnish Lapland were originally thought to represent an inland aspect of the Komsa culture equally old as the earliest finds from the Norwegian coast. However, this material is now considered to be affiliated with the contemporary Post-Swiderian culture of North Central Russia and the eastern Baltic and thus to represent a separate early incursion into northernmost Scandinavia.

The commonly held view today is that the earliest settlement of the North Norwegian coast originated on the western and southwestern coast of Norway and ultimately in the final Palaeolithic Ahrensburg culture of northwestern Europe. The Komsa are thought to have followed the Norwegian coastline when receding glaciation at the end of the last ice age (between 11,000 and 8000 BC) opened up new areas for settlement. It was formerly believed that some elements may have moved into modern-day Finnmark from the northeast, possibly coming from ice-free coasts of the Kola Peninsula. However, recent research indicates that a number of the coastal sites in the Varangerfjord area previously attributed to the second phase of the "Komsa" continuum actually represent an early incursion from the southeast (northwestern Russia) and are related to the early Post-Swiderian influx discovered in northernmost Finnish Lapland.

Archaeological evidence indicates that the Komsa culture was almost exclusively sea-oriented, living mainly off seal hunting and being able boat-builders and fishermen. In comparison to the southern Norway's contemporary Fosna variety of this same culture, stone tools and other implements appear relatively crude. This has been explained with a paucity of flintstone in the region.

== See also ==
- Fosna
- Late Glacial Maximum

== Other sources ==
- Clark, Grahame (2009) The Earlier Stone Age Settlement of Scandinavia (Cambridge University Press) ISBN 978-0-521-10767-9
- Hansen, Lars Ivar and Bjørnar Olsen (2004) Samenes Historie: Fram til 1750 (Cappelen Akademisk) ISBN 978-82-02-19672-1
- Olsen, Bjørnar (1994) Bosetning og samfunn i Finnmarks forhistorie (Universitetsforlaget) ISBN 978-82-00-21941-5
- Olsen, Bjørnar (1997) Fra ting til tekst: Teoretiske perspektiv i arkeologisk forskning (Universitetsforlaget) ISBN 978-82-00-22890-5
