= Kven place names =

Minority-language place names in Norway

Kven place names are predominantly found in Northern Norway, especially in the counties of Troms (Kven: Tromssa) and Finnmark (Finmarkku). The Kvens are recognized as a national minority in Norway, and the Kven language is officially acknowledged as a minority language. Kven is closely related to Meänkieli and the northern dialects of Finnish.

The oldest documented Kven place names in Norway date back to the late 16th century, when a small number of Kvens appeared in tax registers. The Kven population increased in Norway between the 17th and 19th centuries due to migrations from northern parts of Sweden and Finland. By 1875, Kvens made up a quarter of the population in Finnmark and 8% in Troms. In the town of Vadsø (Vesisaari), Kvens accounted for nearly 60% of the population in 1870. Areas with a high concentration of Kven names include Varangerfjord (Varanginvuono), Tana (Taana), Porsanger (Porsanki), Alta (Alattio), Kvænangen (Naavuono), Nordreisa (Raisi), Kåfjord (Kaivuono), Lyngen (Yykeä), and Storfjord (Omasvuono).

Until the mid-19th century, the Norwegian authorities generally held positive attitudes toward linguistic minorities. However, from the 1850s onward, a policy of Norwegianization was implemented. Schools discouraged or banned the use of Kven (Finnish) and Sámi, and Norwegian was enforced as the sole language of instruction and administration. Kven names were systematically removed from official maps for over 120 years, even after Sámi names began to be included again in the 1950s. As a result, the public visibility of Kven names remained limited, with only about a dozen road signs bearing Kven names in Finnmark as of 2008. By that year, Porsanger (Porsanki) was the only municipality in Finnmark to have declared Kven one of its official languages.

A revitalization movement led to the recognition of the Kvens as a national minority in 1998, and of Kven as a minority language separate from Finnish in 2005. The Kven Institute (Kainun institutti) was established in 2005 to promote knowledge about the Kven people and to support the use of the Kven language. Since 2008, the Kven Language Council (Kielitinka) has been responsible for developing a standardized written form of Kven.

The Place Names Act (stadnamnlova) of 1990 protects Kven, Sámi, and Norwegian place names, requiring their use in public contexts when locally relevant. Official references to “Finnish place names” in the law were changed to “Kven place names” in 2006. Since 2015, spelling rules for Kven place names have followed Kven orthographic principles rather than the Finnish ones.

== Databases ==
There are two major databases for Kven place names:

- Kvensk stedsnavndatabase (The Kven Place Names Database), maintained by the Language Council of Norway (Språkrådet), aims to collect and preserve all known Kven place names. The database contains names gathered from the Sentralt stedsnavnregister, as well as from fieldwork conducted by Finnish name researchers in the 1970s and 1980s, who documented thousands of Kven place names by interviewing Kven-speaking individuals to preserve knowledge that might otherwise have been lost. Newer fieldwork has also contributed to the database, which includes both officially approved and unapproved names.
- Sentralt stedsnavnregister (SSR, Central Place Names Register), maintained by the Norwegian Mapping Authority (Kartverket), is the official register of all place names in public use in Norway, including names in minority languages. Many of the Kven names in SSR come from the same fieldwork as the Kven database, though neither database is yet complete. Both continue to be updated with newly approved names and newly collected material.

Field collection of names continues with the support of Språkrådet.

== List of names ==
The following list contains all Finnish or Kven names that are officially recognized by the Norwegian Mapping Authority. The second lists other Finnish names of municipalities, villages, and hamlets in the Northern Norway (most of these names do not have official status).

=== Counties ===
- Finnmark county = Finmarkun fylkki
- Troms county = Tromssan fylkki

The Finnish exonym for northern Norway is Ruija. In Kven, Ruiđa refers to Norway.

=== Other names ===
- Aidejarvi = Aittijärvi
- Alleknjarg = Allikkaniemi
- Alta = Alattio
- Alteidet = Tuikkanen
- Amtmannes = Ariniemi
- Anebakelv = Riekki
- Apaja = Apaja
- Austerbotn = Sokkuvuono
- Avjovarri = Aviovaara
- Badderen = Paattari
- Bæivasgiedde = Päiväskenttä
- Bakfjord = Paakivuono
- Bakkeby = Sokkuvuono
- Balsfjord Municipality = Paatsivuono
- Baskabut = Paskapudas
- Billefjord = Pillavuono
- Bilto = Piltto
- Bognelvdalen = Paunu
- Bonokas = Punakas
- Brashamn = Praashamina
- Brennelv = Lottijoki
- Bugøynes = Pykeija
- Burfjord = Puruvuono
- Båteng = Venekenttä
- Bøkfjorden = Utsavuono
- Børselv = Pyssyjoki
- Børselvnes = Kiksiniemi
- Djupvik = Siennalahti
- Ekkerøy = Ekreija
- Elsnes = Juovankka
- Elvebakken = Joensuu
- Elvevollen = Staaluvankka
- Furuflaten = Yykeänvankka
- Gandvik = Juurivuono
- Grense Jakobselv = Vuoremijoki
- Hallen = Kauppi
- Hamnnes = Karkko
- Havøya = Havöija
- Helligskogen = Pyhäouta
- Hestnes = Hesteniemi
- Hjelmsøya = Jälmesöija
- Holmfjord = Suoluvuono
- Hysingjorden = Matinkenttä
- Høvik = Heviika
- Indre Kvenby = Sisäpää
- Ingøya = Inga
- Jarfjorden = Rautavuono
- Karasjok Municipality = Kaarasjoki
- Kariel = Karieli
- Karleborn = Isovuono
- Karnes = Kariniemi
- Kautokeino Municipality = Koutokeino
- Kiberg = Kiiperi
- Kiby = Kyypi
- Kirkenes = Kirkkoniemi
- Kistrand = Ryssämarkka
- Kitdalen = Soiketanouta
- Kjækan = Kätkänen
- Kjæsklubben = Keisi
- Kjelderen = Kellari
- Kjelmøya = Taalmain saari
- Kjelvik = Kelviika
- Kjosen = Muotkalahti
- Kjø = Kiviö
- Kolvik = Sarvesvuono
- Komagvær = Kummaväri
- Kornes = Ristiniemi
- Korsfjorden = Ristivuono
- Kraknes = Nurmi
- Krampenes = Kramppinen
- Kvænangen Municipality = Naavuono
- Kvænangsbotnen = Naavuononpohja
- Kvænvik = Kreeta
- Kvalnes = Valasniemi
- Kvalvik = Kolsivuopio
- Kvesmenes = Vieksikenttä
- Kåfjord = Kaivuono
- Laggo = Lankovuono
- Lakselv = Lemmijoki
- Laksnes = Lohiniemi
- Langbunes = Lamppuniemi
- Langfjord = Lankovuono
- Lappoluobbal = Lappjärvi
- Laukvik = Lökviika
- Leirbugt = Keväsija
- Leirpollen = Jouluvuono
- Leirpollen = Kenttä
- Levajok = Levajoki
- Loppa Municipality = Lappea
- Lyngen Municipality = Yykeä
- Lyngseidet = Muotka
- Magerøya = Makaravjo
- Magerøya = Makreija
- Manndalen = Olmavankka
- Masjok = Maskijoki
- Maursund = Maarnuora
- Maze = Maasi
- Mellenfjord = Uksiviiki
- Mortensnes = Morttinen
- Munkfjorden = Uutuanvuono
- Måsøy Municipality = Moseija
- Neiden = Näätämö
- Nesseby Municipality = Uuniemi
- Nordkjosen = Ryssäpahta
- Nordlenangen = Itarivuono
- Nordmannvik = Talvisvankka
- Nordnes = Norssi/Notkoniemi
- Nordreisa Municipality = Raisi
- Norskholmen = Pekansaari
- Nyborg = Mäskivuono
- Nyhamn = Nyyhamina
- Olderdalen = Junttaniemi
- Olderfjorden = Leppivuono
- Olderskogen = Leppiouta
- Opnan = Oppana
- Oteren = Saukkonen
- Pollen = Voivuono
- Polmak = Pulmanki
- Porsangen = Porsanginvuono
- Porsanger Municipality = Porsanki
- Porselven = Porsijoki
- Prestelv = Sisäjoki
- Rafsbotn = Rässivuono
- Rasteby = Suoloniemi
- Reinøy = Renöija
- Reinøya = Vassa
- Reipas = Reipas
- Risfjorden = Riisvuono
- Rottenvik = Kuotsavuopio
- Russeluft = Ruoslahti
- Rustefjelbma = Ruostevielma
- Røyelelva = Roijalus
- Salttjern = Salttijärvi
- Sappen = Sappi
- Seida = Lottojoki
- Signaldalen = Singalanouta
- Sirma = Sirma
- Sjuosjavri = Suosjärvi
- Skallelv = Kallijoki
- Skallenes = Kalliniemi
- Skibotn = Markkina/Yykeänperä
- Skibotndalen = Yykeänvankka
- Skipagurra = Kiippakura
- Skjervøy Municipality = Kierua
- Skogerøya = Saalamo
- Skogfoss = Hakoköngäs
- Skullnes = Kullaselva
- Smalfjorden = Rautuvuono
- Smørfjord = Smirvuono
- Snemyren = Lumijänkkä
- Sopnes = Suppiniemi
- Stjernøya = Siernöijä
- Storfjord Municipality = Omasvuono
- Storslett = Hansinkenttä
- Storvik = Lahti
- Storviknes = Kalkkiniemi
- Suohpajavri = Suoppajärvi
- Svartfoss = Mustaniva
- Svartnes = Mustaniemi
- Sørkjosen = Rässikäinen
- Talvik = Talmulahti
- Tamsøya = Taumusaari/Tamsöijä
- Tana Municipality = Taana (Finnish: Teno)
- Tana bru = Tenon kylä
- Tappeluft = Tappolahti
- Tomaselv = Turvejoki
- Transfarelva = Kaidusjoki
- Tromsø = Tromssa
- Tromsøysundet = Tromssannuora
- Tverrelva = Tuorisjoki
- Tørfossnes = Kuivakoski
- Ullsfjorden = Moskivuono
- Vadsø = Vesisaari
- Vækker = Väkkärä
- Vainesbund = Vierivuono
- Vardø = Vuoreija
- Veibakken = Paali
- Vesterbotn = Lemmivuono
- Vestre Jakobselv = Annijoki
- Vinnelys = Varppi
- Ytre Kvenby = Ulkojoki
- Ytre Leirpollen = Piesankoppa
- Øksfjord = Aksuvuono

== See also ==
- Finnish exonyms
- List of European exonyms
