= Finnish exonyms =

Below is a list of Finnish language exonyms for places in non-Finnish-speaking areas:

Note that the Finnish language inflects place names where English use prepositions like in and to. These variants can affect any place name and are inflections, not exonyms. For example Mene Birminghamiin means Go to Birmingham.

== General ==
Foreign place names containing a direction such as South or Upper are often translated, e.g.:

North Carolina → Pohjois-Carolina; Upper Volta → Ylä-Volta

== Belgium ==
Belgium Belgia
English name	Finnish name	Endonym		Notes
English name	Finnish name	Name	Language	Notes
Brussels	Bryssel	Brussel	Dutch	
Brussels	Bryssel	Bruxelles	French	

== China ==
China Kiina
English name	Finnish name	Endonym		Notes
English name	Finnish name	Name	Language	Notes
Beijing	Peking			
Guangzhou	Kanton			
Nanjing	Nanking			

== Cuba ==
Cuba Kuuba
English name	Finnish name	Endonym		Notes
English name	Finnish name	Name	Language	Notes
Havana	Havanna	La Habana	Spanish	

== Cyprus ==
Cyprus Kypros
English name	Finnish name	Endonym		Notes
English name	Finnish name	Name	Language	Notes
Nicosia	Nikosia	Lefkoşa	Turkish	
Nicosia	Nikosia	Levkosía	Greek	

== Denmark ==
Denmark Tanska
English name	Finnish name	Endonym		Notes
English name	Finnish name	Name	Language	Notes
Copenhagen	Kööpenhamina	København	Danish	
Jutland	Jyllanti, Juutinmaa	Jylland	Danish	

== Egypt ==
Egypt Egypti
English name	Finnish name	Endonym		Notes
English name	Finnish name	Name	Language	Notes
Alexandria	Aleksandria	Al-Iskandariyya	Standard Arabic	
Aswan	Assuan	Aswān	Standard Arabic	
Cairo	Kairo	Al-Qahirah	Standard Arabic	
Nile River	Niili	an-Nīl	Standard Arabic	

== Estonia ==
Estonian and Finnish are quite closely related and share many words that differ only slightly, such as saar (Estonian) and saari (Finnish) for island. Many Estonian toponyms and even people's names are simply translated into Finnish as if they were Finnish words, creating an unlimited number of potentially existing exonyms. Below are only some frequently encountered examples of these, as well as those where the difference is significant.

Estonia Viro
English name	Finnish name	Endonym		Notes
English name	Finnish name	Name	Language	Notes
Emajõgi River	Emajoki	Emajõgi	Estonian	
Hiiumaa	Hiidenmaa	Hiiumaa	Estonian	
Lake Lämmi	Kuumajärvi	Lämmijärv	Estonian	
Lake Pihkva	Pihkovanjärvi	Pihkva järv	Estonian	
Narva River	Narvanjoki	Narva jõgi	Estonian	
Revala	Rääveli	Rävala	Estonian	Archaic
Saaremaa	Saarenmaa	Saaremaa	Estonian	
Suur Munamägi	Iso Munamäki	Suur Munamägi	Estonian	
Tallinn	Tallinna	Tallinn	Estonian	
Tartu	Tartto	Tartu	Estonian	

== Finland ==
Finland Suomi
English name	Finnish name	Endonym		Notes
English name	Finnish name	Name	Language	Notes
Åland	Ahvenanmaa	Åland	Swedish	
Bergö	Susiluoto	Bergö	Swedish	
Brandö	Präntiö	Brandö	Swedish	
Delet	Teili	Delet	Swedish	
Hammarland	Hammarlanti	Hammarland	Swedish	
Karlby	Kaarlenkylä	Karlby	Swedish	
Kökar	Köökari	Kökar	Swedish	
Korsnäs	Korsnääsi, Ristitaipale	Korsnäs	Swedish	
Korsö	Koskenpää	Korsö	Swedish	
Kumlinge	Kumlinki	Kumlinge	Swedish	
Lemland	Lemlanti	Lemland	Swedish	
Lumparland	Lumparlanti	Lumparland	Swedish	
Mariehamn	Maarianhamina	Mariehamn	Swedish	
Lumparn	Lumpari	Lumparn	Swedish	
Sålis	Suolaksi	Sålis	Swedish	

The Swedish names for the above are commonly (if not exclusively) used in modern-day Finnish. Korsnäs in Ostrobothnia should not be confused with other locations in Finland with the same name (see Korsnäs (disambiguation)).

Areas with both Finnish-, and Swedish-speaking inhabitants have endonymic place names in both languages. Due to changing demographics, some monolingually Swedish areas have historical Finnish names inherited from earlier Finnish-speaking inhabitants. For example, Molpe, a village of Korsnäs is Moikipää in Finnish.

== France ==
France Ranska
English name	Finnish name	Endonym		Notes
English name	Finnish name	Name	Language	Notes
Corsica	Korsika	Corse	French	
Nice	Nizza	Nice	French	
Paris	Pariisi	Paris	French	

== Germany ==
Germany Saksa
English name	Finnish name	Endonym		Notes
English name	Finnish name	Name	Language	Notes
Bavaria	Baijeri	Bayern	German	
Berlin	Berliini			
Danube River	Tonava	Donau		
Hamburg	Hampuri			
Lübeck	Lyypekki			
Prussia	Preussi	Preußen	German	historic state
Rhine River	Rein	Rhein	German	
Rhineland	Reininmaa	Rheinland	German	
Saxony	Saksi	Sachsen	German	

== Greece ==
Ancient transcriptions that do not reflect modern pronunciation are used in some cases, e.g. Herakleion ("Iraklion").

Greece Kreikka
English name	Finnish name	Endonym		Notes
English name	Finnish name	Name	Language	Notes
Athens	Ateena	Athína	Greek	
Corfu	Korfu	Kerkýra	Greek	
Crete	Kreeta	Kríti	Greek	
Piraeus	Pireus	Piraiás	Greek	

== Israel ==
Israel
English name	Finnish name	Endonym		Notes
English name	Finnish name	Name	Language	Notes
Dead Sea	Kuollutmeri	Al-Bahr al-Mayyit	Arabic	
Dead Sea	Kuollutmeri	Yam ha-Melah	Hebrew	
Jerusalem	Jerusalem	Al-Quds	Arabic	
Jerusalem	Jerusalem	Yerushalayim	Hebrew	
Jordan River	Jordanvirta	Nahr al-ʾUrdunn	Arabic	
Jordan River	Jordanvirta	Nahár HaYardēn	Hebrew	
Jordan Valley	Jordanlaakso	Ghawr al-Urdunn	Arabic	
Jordan Valley	Jordanlaakso	Emek HaYarden	Hebrew	
Nazareth	Nasaret	An-Nāṣira	Arabic	
Nazareth	Nasaret	Netzer	Hebrew	
Sea of Galilee	Gennesaretinjärvi	Buḥayrat Ṭabariyya	Arabic	
Sea of Galilee	Gennesaretinjärvi	Yam Kinéret	Hebrew	

== Latvia ==
Latvia
English name	Finnish name	Endonym		Notes
English name	Finnish name	Name	Language	Notes
Daugava River	Väinäjoki	Daugava	Latvian	
Daugavpils	Väinänlinna	Daugavpils	Latvian	
Riga	Riika	Rīga	Latvian	
Salacgrīva	Salatsi	Salacgrīva	Latvian	
Valka	Valga	Valka	Latvian	

== Lebanon ==
Lebanon Libanon
English name	Finnish name	Endonym		Notes
English name	Finnish name	Name	Language	Notes
Beqaa Valley	Bekaanlaakso	Wādī l-Biqā'	Arabic	
Mount Hermon	Hermonvuori	Har Hermon	Hebrew	
Mount Hermon	Hermonvuori	Jabal al-Shaykh, Jabal Haramun	Arabic	
Mount Lebanon	Libanonvuoret	Ṭūr Levnon	Syriac	
Mount Lebanon	Libanonvuoret	Jabal Lubnān	Arabic	
Tripoli	Tripoli, Tripolis	Ṭarābulus	Arabic	
Tyre	Tyros, Tyyros	Ṣūr	Arabic, Phoenician	

== Lithuania ==
Lithuania Liettua
English name	Finnish name	Endonym		Notes
English name	Finnish name	Name	Language	Notes
Vilnius	Vilna	Vilnius	Lithuanian	

== Norway ==
Norway Norja
Norwegian name	Finnish name	Other endonyms		Notes
Norwegian name	Finnish name	Name	Language	Notes
Albert I Land	Albert I:n maa			
Alta	Alattio	Áltá	North Sami	Finnish Alattio or Alta
Altaelva	Alattionjoki or Altajoki	Álttáeatnu; Álaheajeatnu	North Sami; North Sami	
Altafjorden	Alattionvuono or Altavuono	Álttávuonna; Álaheajvuonna	North Sami; North Sami	
Bjørnøya	Karhusaari			
Boknafjorden	Boknavuono			
Bouvetøya	Bouvet'nsaari			
Bugøynes	Pykeija	Pykeijä; Buođggák	Kven; North Sami	
Børselv	Pyssyjoki	Bissojohka	North Sami	
Danskøya	Tanskansaari			
Dronning Maud Land	Kuningatar Maudin maa			
Finnmarksvidda	Ruijan ylänkö			
Jakobselva (Grense J.)	Vuoremijoki	Vuorjám(johka)	North Sami	
Jakobselva (Vestre Jakobselv)	Annijoki	Ánnejohka	North Sami	
Karasjok	Kaarasjoki	Kárášjohka	North Sami	
Kautokeino	Koutokeino	Guovdageaidnu	North Sami	
Kirkenes	Kirkkoniemi	Girkonjárga	North Sami	
Kong Karls Land	Kuningas Kaarlen maa			
Kvitøya	Valkosaari			
Kvænangen	Naavuono	Návuonna	North Sami	
Lakselv	Lemmijoki	Leavdnja	North Sami	
Lakselva	Lemmijoki	Leavdnjajohka	North Sami	
Lofoten	Lofootit	Lufuohttá; Lufoahtta	North Sami; Lule Sami	
Lyngen	Jyykeä			Finnish Lyngen or Jyykeä
Lyngen (Lyngenfjorden)	Lyngenvuono or Jyykeänvuono	Yykeänvuono; Ivguvuotna	Kven; North Sami	
Malangen	Malankivuono			
Neidenfjorden	Näätämönvuono	Njávdámvuonna	North Sami	
Nordaustlandet	Koillismaa			
Nordenskiöldbukta	Nordenskiöldinlahti			
Nordreisa	Raisi	Ráisa	North Sami	
Ofotfjorden	Ofotvuono	Ufuohttá	North Sami	
Peter I Øy	Pietari I:n saari			
Polmak	Pulmanki	Buolbmát	North Sami	
Porsanger	Porsanki	Porsáŋgu	North Sami	
Porsangerfjorden	Porsanginvuono	Porsáŋgguvuotna	North Sami	
Porsangerhalvøya	Porsangin niemimaa			
Prins Karls Forland	Prinssi Kaarlen etumaa			
Prins Harald Kyst	Prinssi Haraldin rannikko			
Sjuøyane	Seitsensaaret			
Skibotn	Jyykeänperä	Yykeänperä; Ivgobahta	Kven; North Sami	Finnish Skibotn or Jyykeänperä
Sognefjorden	Sognevuono			
Spitsbergen	Länsimaa			
Svalbard	Huippuvuoret			
Sør-Varanger	Etelä-Varanki			
Tana	Teno	Deatnu	North Sami	
Tana bru	Tenonsilta	Deanušaldi	North Sami	Finnish Tana bru or Tenonsilta
Tanafjorden	Tenonvuono	Deanuvuotna	North Sami	
Tromsø	Tromssa	Romsa	North Sami	
Trondheimsfjorden	Trondheiminvuono			
Ullsfjorden	Moskivuono	Olggosvuotna	North Sami	Finnish Ullsfjorden or Moskivuono
Vadsø	Vesisaari	Čáhcesuolu	North Sami	
Varangerfjorden	Varanginvuono	Varenkinvuono; Várjavuonna	Kven; North Sami	
Varangerhalvøya	Varangin niemimaa	Varenkinniemi; Várnjárga	Kven; North Sami	
Vardø	Vuoreija	Vuorea	Kven	
Vesterbotn	Lemmivuono	Leavdnjavuotna	North Sami	
Vestfjorden	Länsivuono			
Vestre Jakobselv	Annijoki	Ánnejohka	North Sami	

For further names, see Finnish exonyms for places in Norway.

== Poland ==
Poland Puola
English name	Finnish name	Endonym		Notes
English name	Finnish name	Name	Language	Notes
Kraków	Krakova	Kraków	Polish	
Warsaw	Varsova	Warszawa	Polish	
Vistula River	Veiksel	Wisła	Polish	

== Portugal ==
Portugal Portugali
English name	Finnish name	Endonym		Notes
English name	Finnish name	Name	Language	Notes
Lisbon	Lissabon	Lisboa	Portuguese	

== Romania ==
Romania
English name	Finnish name	Endonym		Notes
English name	Finnish name	Name	Language	Notes
Bucharest	Bukarest	București	Romanian	

== Russia ==
Note that Finnish was formerly an official language in the Republic of Karelia and is still widely used there, and some places in what was Finnish territory until World War II have been given new Russian names; thus, Finnish names of Karelian places are not all strictly exonyms.

Russia Venäjä
English name	Finnish name	Endonym		Notes
English name	Finnish name	Name	Language	Notes
Arkhangelsk	Arkangeli, Vienankaupunki	Архангельск / Arkhangelsk	Russian	
Belomorsk	Sorokka			
Beloostrov	Valkeasaari			
Bolshaya Izhora	Haisevaisi			
Bolshoy Tyuters	Tytärsaari			
Borisoglebsky	Kolttaköngäs	Борисоглебский / Borisoglebsky	Russian	
Chudovo	Tšudovo, Tiutova			
Gatchina	Hatsina			
Gubanicy	Kupanitsa			
Hogland, Gogland	Suursaari			
Ivangorod	Iivananlinna			
Izhora	Inkere			
Kamennogorsk	Antrea			
Kandalakshi	Kantalahti, Kannanlahti			
Kem	(Vienan) Kemi			
Kingisepp	Jaama			
Kirovsk	Hiipinä			
Kobrino	Koprina			
Kola	Kuola			
Kolpany	Kolppana			
Koltushi	Keltto			
Komarovo	Kellomäki	Комарово / Komarovo	Russian	
Kondopoga	Kontupohja	Kondupohju	Karelian	
Koporka	Kaprionjoki			
Koporye	Kaprio			
Kostomuksha	Kostamus	Koštamuš	Karelian	
Kotlin	Retusaari			
Kotly	Kattila			
Kovdor	Koutero			
Kovdozero	Kananen			
Kurovitsy	Kukkosi	Kukkuzi	Votic	
Kuyto	Kuittijärvet			
Kuzyomkino	Kosemkina, Narvusi			
Lake Ilmen	Ilmajärvi			
Lake Kolvitskoye	Kolvitsanjärvi			
Lake Kovdozero	Koutajärvi			
Lake Lämmi	Kuumajärvi	Tyopoloye ozero	Russian	
Lake Ladoga	Laatokka, Nevajärvi			
Lake Leksozero	Lieksajärvi			
Lake Lovozero	Luujärvi			
Lake Nyuk	Nuokkijärvi			
Lake Onega	Ääninen, Äänisjärvi	Änine, Änižjärv	Veps	
Lake Onega	Ääninen, Äänisjärvi	Oniegu(-järve)	Karelian	
Lake Pyaozero	Pääjärvi			
Lake Segozero	Seesjärvi			
Lake Syamozero	Säämäjärvi	Seämärvi	Karelian	
Lake Topozero	Tuoppajärvi			
Lake Tolvayarvi	Tolvajärvi			
Lake Tulos	Tuulijärvi			
Lake Yaglyarvi	Ägläjärvi			
Lake Vodlozero	Vodlajärvi			
Lake Vygozero	Uikujärvi			
Lebyazhye	Lepäsi	Лебяжье / Lebyazhye		
Lembolovo	Lempaala			
Lisino	Liissilä			
Lodeynoye Pole	Lotinapelto, Pellonlinna			
Luga	Laukaa, Ylä-Laukaa			
Markovo	Markkova, Loppi, Lopenkolkka			
Martyshkino	Tyrö			
Medvezhyegorsk	Karhumäki	Karhumägi	Karelian	
Mga	Namkku			
Moloskovitsy	Valkeakirkko, Moloskovitsa			
Moscow	Moskova	Москва / Moskva	Russian	
Moshchny	Lavansaari			
Murmansk	Muurmanni, Muurmanski			
Nikel	Nikkeli, Kolosjoki	Никель / Nikel	Russian	
Nikolskoye	Lomkka			
Nikulyasy	Miikkulainen			
Novaya Ladoga	Uusi-Laatokka, Uusi Laatokankaupunki			
Novosyolki	Novasolkka			
Nyenschantz	Nevanlinna	Nyenskans, Nyen	Swedish	Former Swedish Ingrian town and fortress
Olonets	Aunuksenkaupunki, Aunuksenlinna, Aunus	Anuksenlinnu	Karelian	
Onega	Ääninen			
Oranienbaum	Kaarosta			
Osinovaya Rossha	Haapakangas			
Pechenga	Petsamo	Печенга / Pechenga	Russian	
Pechory	Petseri			
Petergof	Pietarhovi, Kuusoja			
Petrozavodsk	Petroskoi; Äänislinna			Latter name used during 1941–1944
Priozersk	Käkisalmi			
Pskov	Pihkova			
Pudozh	Puudosi, Puutoinen, Puudoži	Pudož	Veps	
Pudozh	Puudosi, Puutoinen, Puudoži	Puudoži	Karelian	
Repino	Kuokkala			
Ropsha	Ropsu			
Ryabovo	Rääpyvä			
Saint Petersburg	Pietari	Санкт-Петербург / Sankt-Peterburg	Russian	
Segezha	Sege(h)e, Seke(h)e			
Seskar	Seiskari			
Siberia	Siperia	Сибирь / Sibir	Russian	
Sestroretsk	Siestarjoki			
Shlisselburg	Pähkinälinna, Pähkinäsaari	Schlüsselburg	German	
Shlisselburg Fortress	Pähkinäsaaren linna	Oreshek	Russian	
Skvoritsy	Skuoritsa, Kuoritsa			
Slavyanka	Venjoki			
Soikino	Soikkola			
Sosnovy Bor	Uustia			
Staraya Ladoga	Laatokankaupunki, Laatokanlinna, Vanha-Laatokka			
Stolbovo	Stolbova			
Svetogorsk	Enso			
Svir	Syväri			
Svobodnoye	Kirvu			
Syas	Säsjoki			
Tikhvin	Tihvinä			
Toksovo	Toksova			
Tosno	Tusina, Tosna			
Tyaglino	Tääkeli, Tääkkeli			
Umba	Umpi			
Ust-Luga	Laukaansuu			
Volkhov	Olhava			
Vsevolozhsk	Seuloskoi			
Vyborg	Viipuri	Viborg	Swedish	
Vyborgskiy zaliv	Viipurinlahti			
Vyg	Uikujoki			
Yarvosol	Järvisaari			
Zelenogorsk	Terijoki			
Zemlyanoye	Pummanki			
Zherebyatki	Serepetta			

== Saudi Arabia ==
Saudi Arabia Saudi-Arabia
English name	Finnish name	Endonym		Notes
English name	Finnish name	Name	Language	Notes
Mecca	Mekka	Makkah	Arabic	

== Serbia ==
Serbia
English name	Finnish name	Endonym		Notes
English name	Finnish name	Name	Language	Notes
Belgrade	Belgrad	Beograd	Serbian	

== South Africa ==
South Africa Etelä-Afrikka
English name	Finnish name	Endonym		Notes
English name	Finnish name	Name	Language	Notes
Cape Town	Kapkaupunki			
Cape of Good Hope	Hyväntoivonniemi			

== Spain ==
Spain Espanja
English name	Finnish name	Endonym		Notes
English name	Finnish name	Name	Language	Notes
Tenerife	Teneriffa	Tenerife	Spanish	

== Sweden ==
Northern Sweden has a Finnish/Meänkieli-speaking minority and thus some place names are derived from Finnish, making them not exonyms. There are several more Finnish place names in this area.

Several place names of genuinely Swedish places, more than these, have been modified due to the much differing Finnish pronunciation principles. Meänkieli names have usually been slightly modified when picked up by Swedish language. Some Meänkieli names, at least closer to the mountains, were originally Sami, but were modified when picked up into Finnish.

Sweden Ruotsi
English name	Finnish name	Endonym		Notes
English name	Finnish name	Name	Language	Notes
Dalecarlia	Taalainmaa	Dalarna	Swedish	
Gällivare	Jällivaara, Jellivaara	Gällivare	Swedish	Jellivaara is the Meänkieli form
Haparanda	Haaparanta	Haparanda	Swedish	* Founded with Finnish name
Jokkmokk	Jokimukka	Jokkmokk	Swedish	Founded with Sami name
Kalix	Kainuu	Kalix	Swedish	*
Karesuando	Karesuvanto	Karesuando	Swedish	* Founded with Finnish name
Kiruna	Kiiruna	Kiruna	Swedish	* Founded with Finnish name
Korpilombolo	Korpilompolo	Korpilombolo	Swedish	*
Luleå	Luulaja	Luleå	Swedish	
Överkalix	Ylikainuu	Överkalix	Swedish	*
Övertorneå	Matarenki	Övertorneå	Swedish	*
Piteå	Piitime	Piteå	Swedish	
Scania	Skoone	Skåne	Swedish	
Stockholm	Tukholma	Stockholm	Swedish	
Svanstein	Turtola	Svanstein	Swedish	*
Tärendö	Täräntö	Tärendö	Swedish	* Founded with Finnish name
Umeå	Uumaja	Umeå	Swedish	
Uppsala	Upsala	Uppsala	Swedish	

* marks place names in traditionally Finnish/Meänkieli-speaking areas.

== Syria ==
Syria Syyria
English name	Finnish name	Endonym		Notes
English name	Finnish name	Name	Language	Notes
Damascus	Damaskos	Dimašq	Arabic	
Latakia	Lattakia	Al-Laḏiqiyah	Arabic	

== Turkey ==
Turkey Turkki
English name	Finnish name	Endonym		Notes
English name	Finnish name	Name	Language	Notes
Edirne	Adrianopoli	Edirne	Turkish	historic
Edirne	Adrianopoli	Adrianoúpoli	Greek	historic
Antakya	Antiokia	Antakya	Turkish	
Antakya	Antiokia	Antiókheia hē epì Oróntou	Greek	
Istanbul	Konstantinopoli	İstanbul	Turkish	historic
Istanbul	Konstantinopoli	Konstantinoúpolis	Greek	historic
İzmir	Smyrna	İzmir	Turkish	historic
İzmir	Smyrna	Smýrni	Greek	historic
Troy	Troija	Troíā	Greek	ancient city

== Ukraine ==
Ukraine Ukraina
English name	Finnish name	Endonym		Notes
English name	Finnish name	Name	Language	Notes
Kharkiv	Harkova	Kharkiv	Ukrainian	
Kyiv	Kiova	Kyiv	Ukrainian	
Poltava	Pultava	Poltava	Ukrainian	

== United Kingdom ==
United Kingdom Iso-Britannia
English name	Finnish name	Endonym		Notes
English name	Finnish name	Name	Language	Notes
London	Lontoo	London	English	

== See also ==
- List of European exonyms
