= Kven flag =

Flag of the Kven people

The Kven flag was designed by Bengt Johansson-Kyrö, who took the motif of the sun flower (sunflower) from the traditional motifs of käsityö (the Kven homemaking culture).

The Kven flag (Kven: kvääniflaku) has been officially used as a symbol to represent the Kven people of Norway, Sweden, and Finland since 2009. It was designed by Bengt Johansson-Kyrö.

== Design ==
The Kven flag was designed by the artist Bengt Johansson-Kyrö. The flag has a dark blue background and a motif of a sunflower or sunflower (aurinkonkukka or auringonkukka) which has been found on several artifacts such as hunting horns, looms, and boats, and is still used in traditional käsityö (Kven handicrafts).

== Use of the flag ==
The flag's design was ready in 2007. The Kvenlandsförbundet organized a competition to have a Kven flag made. Johansson-Kyrö's design won the competition. It was only in 2009 that the Kvenlandsförbundet decided to adopt the flag. This happened at a meeting with members from Norway, Sweden and Finland.

The flag was first used on a public flagpole outside the town hall in Kiruna Municipality in Sweden on Kven people's day in 2013. In 2017, the flag was hung at the Town Hall in Storfjord Municipality.

At the national board meeting of the Norwegian Kven Organization on 29-30 April 2017, the flag was also adopted by the KNF.

In March 2018, among others, Kvænangen Municipality raised the Kven flag for the first time, as did Nordreisa Municipality, Porsanger Municipality and Troms county, and in March 2019 the flag was raised in Tromsø Municipality on Kven people's day.

In 2018, the Ministry of Local Government and Regional Development refused a request from the Norwegian Kven Organization for public approval of the Kven Flag. The ministry said at the same time that Norwegian municipalities and others were free to use the flag to mark Kven People's Day and other events.

In 2022, 15 years after the creation of the flag, Johansson-Kyrö was awarded the first Nordic Kven culture prize for his efforts. The reason for the prize states:

transl. Since 2007 and 2013, the flag has become the most important material marker for Kven-Finnish. Johansson-Kyrö's winning entry from 2007 in the Kvenlandsförbundet's competition takes an ancient symbol of Kven and Finns into a sea of new possibilities for all Kven and like-minded people. Bengt Johansson-Kyrö is the rightful recipient of the first Nordic Kven culture prize.

== See also ==
- Kven people
