= Ruijan Kaiku =

Newspaper published in Tromsø, Norway

- Type: Monthly
- Format: Tabloid
- Owner(s): Nordavis AS; Norwegian Kven Organization
- Editor-in-chief: Arne Hauge
- Launched: 1995
- Language: Kven, Finnish and Norwegian
- Headquarters: Alta, Norway
- ISSN: 1503-6138
- Website: www.ruijan-kaiku.no

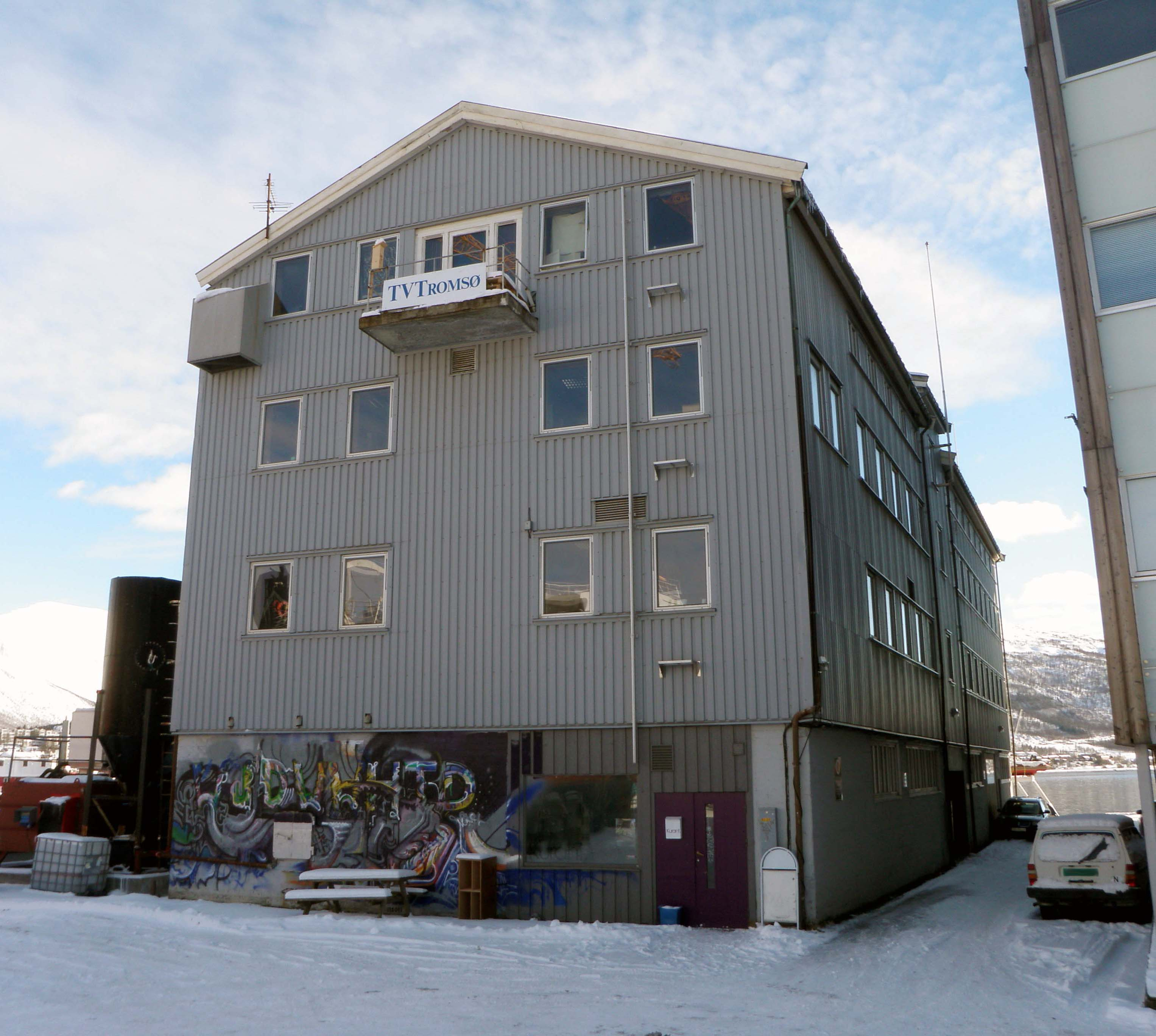
Ruijan Kaiku main offices are located in Søndre Tollbodgate 17 in Tromsø

Ruijan Kaiku (Kven: "Echo of Norway"; Finnish: "Echo of Northern Norway") is a multilingual newspaper (Kven, Finnish and Norwegian) that is published in Alta, Norway. It is the only Kven-language newspaper in Norway.

== History and profile ==
Ruijan Kaiku was established in 1995. At the start two issues were published each month, but due to financial problems currently only a single issue is published per month. The newspaper is about 8-pages and is in a tabloid format. Its chief editor since the start had been Liisa Koivulehto.

The newspaper writes mostly about Kven issues, and about the work of strengthening Kven language and culture in Norway. In addition the paper has stories about other Kven organizations in Norway, and about other Finnic minorities in the Nordic and surrounding countries.

== See also ==
- Ruijan Suomenkielinen Lehti
