= Ruija language =

Ruija language or Ruija dialect may refer to:

- Kven language, a Finnish-like language, recognized as an own language i 2005, spoken by the Kven people in Northern Norway
- Northern Sámi, the Sámi language spoken by Sámi peoples living in Northern Norway
