= Kvænangsbotn Hydroelectric Power Station =

Kvænangsbotn Power Station
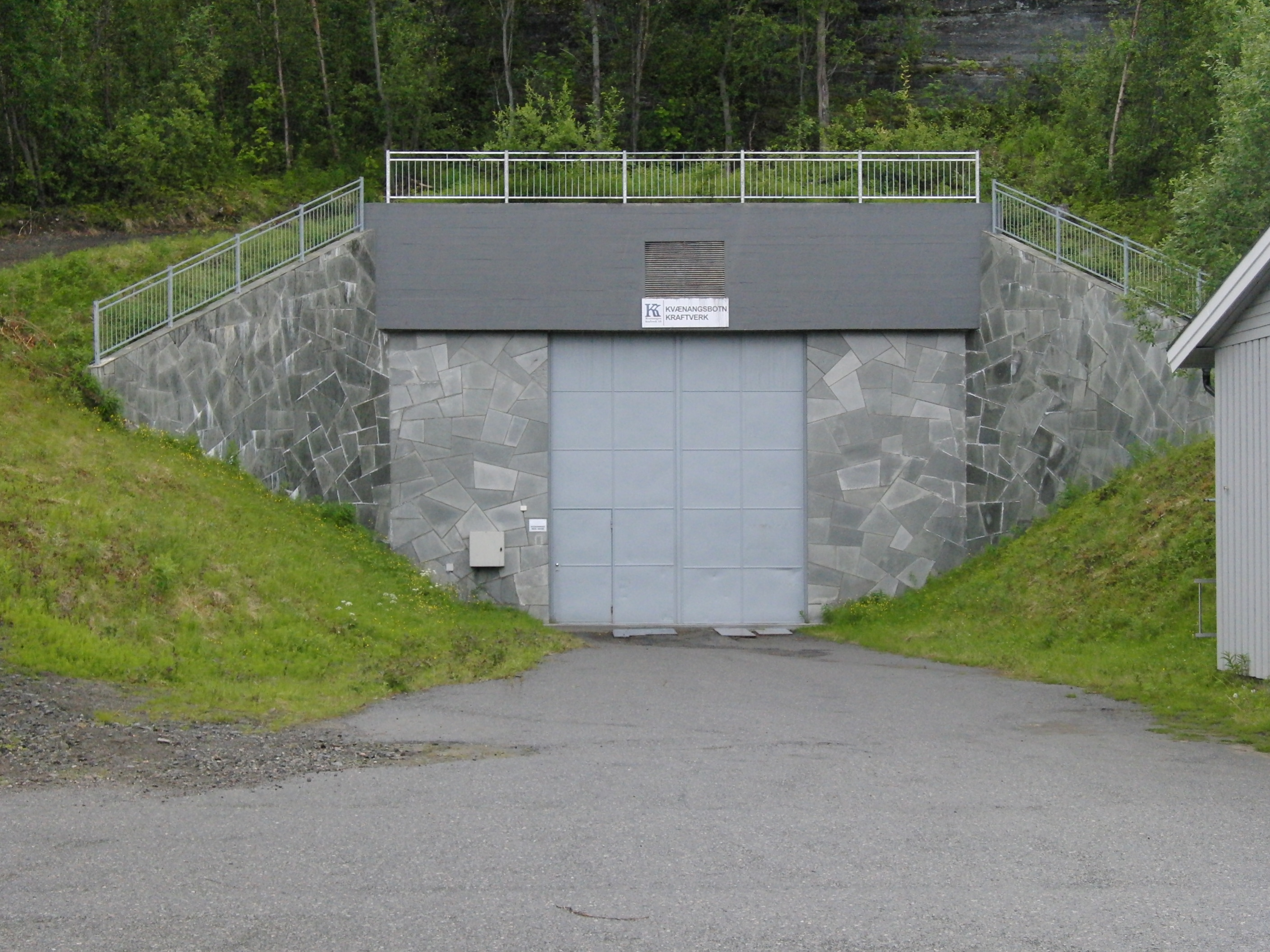
- Official name: Kvænangsbotn kraftverk
- Country: Norway
- Location: Kvænangen, Troms
- Coordinates: 69°43′15″N 22°03′19″E
- Status: Operational
- Opening date: 1965; 60 years ago
- Owner(s): Kvænangen Kraftverk AS

Power Station
- Hydraulic head: 305 metres (1,001 ft)
- Turbines: 1 × 44 MW
- Installed capacity: 44 MW
- Capacity factor: 45.7%
- Annual generation: 176 GW·h

The Kvænangsbotn Hydroelectric Power Station (Norwegian: Kvænangsbotn kraftverk) is a hydroelectric power station in Kvænangen Municipality in Troms county, Norway. It utilizes a drop of 305 meters (1,001 ft) between its intake reservoir at Little Lakes (Norwegian: Småvatnan, Kven: Pikkujärvet, Northern Sami: Čorrojávrrit) and South Fjord (Norwegian: Sørfjorden, Kven: Sutuvuono, Northern Sami: Suvdovuotna). The reservoir is regulated at a level between 315 m (1,033 ft) and 305 m (1,001 ft). The Abo River (Norwegian: Aboelva, Kven: Aapujoki, Northern Sami: Ábojohka) is also utilized by the power plant. Water is supplied to the reservoir by the Småvatna, Lassajavre, and Cårrujavrit Hydroelectric Power Stations. The plant came into operation in 1965. In 1999 the company received a license to transfer water from the Brenn River (Northern Sami: Buollánjohka), Šleađui River (Northern Sami: Šleađuidjohka), and Olbmá River (Northern Sami: Olbmájohka). The plant has a Francis turbine and operates at an installed capacity of 44 MW, with an average annual production of about 176 GWh. The plant is controlled by Kvænangen Kraftverk AS, with a 48.2% share owned by Troms Kraft.
