= Karl Akre =

Norwegian educator and politician

Karl Edvard Pedersen Akre (26 March 1840 – 14 March 1912) was a Norwegian educator and politician for the Liberal Party.

He was born in Alta, and graduated as a teacher from Tromsø Seminary in 1862. He started working as a teacher in Kjelvik, but moved to Vadsø in 1865. At the primary school there, he advanced from second teacher to first teacher in 1884 and headmaster in 1911.

With minor interruptions he was a member of the town council of Vadsø from 1869 to 1910, and also chaired the school board. He was elected to the Parliament of Norway in 1885, representing the urban constituency of Hammerfest, Vardø og Vadsø. He served only one three-year term 1886–1889.

Akre was a co-founder of the newspaper Finmarkens Amtstidende in 1871. His orthography was ahead of its time, and reminiscent of the 1907 standard of Riksmål (Dano-Norwegian). He was also a supporter of Landsmål, and founded the Landsmål publication Finnmarkingen together with Ananias J. Brune in July 1875. This was the northernmost Landsmål publication in Norway, however it only lasted for two issues. Later, in 1877, Akre publicly supported the Finnish language newspaper for the minority in Finnmark, Ruijan Suomenkielinen Lehti. Akre had been a teacher for Kven people in Alta, and was one of the few Norwegians who publicly supported the newspaper's existence. Akre was also a temperance activist, presiding over the meeting that founded the DNGTO (a splinter of IOGT) in June 1888. He died in March 1912 in Vadsø.
