= Šuoikkatjávri =

Lake in Troms and Finnmark counties, Norway

Šuoikkatjávri (Northern Sami); Hyttysenjärvi (Kven)
- Interactive map of the lake
- Location: Kvænangen, Troms
- Coordinates: 69.55079°N 22.36838°E
- Primary outflows: Njemenjáikojohka river
- Basin countries: Norway
- Max. length: 11.5 kilometres (7.1 mi)
- Max. width: 920 metres (3,020 ft)
- Surface area: 6.44 km^{2} (2.49 sq mi)
- Shore length^{1}: 28.35 kilometres (17.62 mi)
- Surface elevation: 522 metres (1,713 ft)
- References: NVE
- ^{1} Shore length is not a well-defined measure.

Šuoikkátjávri (Northern Sami) or Hyttysenjärvi (Kven) is a lake in Northern Norway. The 6.44-square-kilometre (2.49 sq mi) lake lies in Kvænangen Municipality in Troms county (and the far southern tip of the lake sometimes crosses over slightly into Kautokeino Municipality in Finnmark county. The somewhat S-shaped lake is about 10 kilometres (6.2 mi) long and is only about 900 metres (3,000 ft) wide. It serves as the reservoir for the Cårrujavrit Hydroelectric Power Station.

== See also ==
- List of lakes in Norway
