= Småvatna Hydroelectric Power Station =

Norwegian power facility

Småvatna Power Station
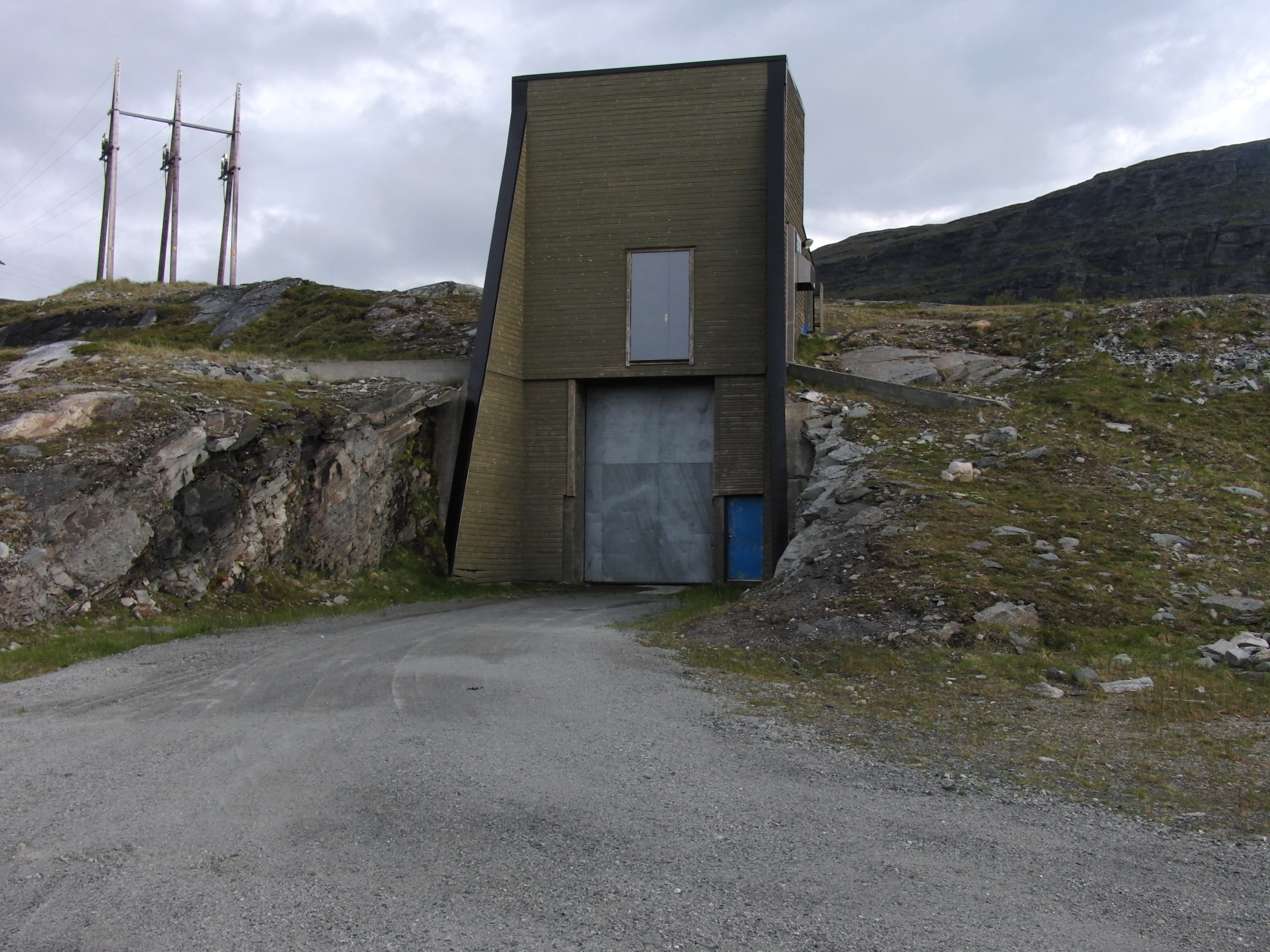
- Official name: Småvatna kraftverk
- Country: Norway
- Location: Kvænangen, Troms
- Coordinates: 69°41′21″N 22°09′20″E
- Status: Operational
- Opening date: 1969; 56 years ago
- Owner(s): Kvænangen Kraftverk AS

Upper reservoir
- Creates: Lake Lassa

Lower reservoir
- Creates: Little Lakes

Power Station
- Hydraulic head: 283 metres (928 ft)
- Turbines: 1 × 18.8 MW
- Installed capacity: 18.8 MW
- Capacity factor: 37.1%
- Annual generation: 61 GW·h

The Småvatna Hydroelectric Power Station (Norwegian: Småvatna kraftverk) is a hydroelectric power station in Kvænangen Municipality in Troms county, Norway. The plant utilizes a 283-meter (928 ft) drop between Lake Lassa (Kven: Lassojärvi, Northern Sami: Lássájávri) and Little Lakes (Norwegian: Småvatnan, Kven: Pikkujärvet, Northern Sami: Čorrojávrrit). Lake Lassa is regulated at a level between 543 m (1,781 ft) and 519 m (1,703 ft), and Little Lakes serves as the reservoir for the Kvænangsbotn Hydroelectric Power Station. The Småvatna plant also utilizes water from Abo River (Norwegian: Aboelva, Kven: Aapujoki, Northern Sami: Ábojohka) and the Lassajavre Hydroelectric Power Station. The plant came into operation in 1969. It has a Francis turbine and operates at an installed capacity of 18.8 MW, with an average annual production of about 61 GWh. The plant is controlled by Kvænangen Kraftverk AS, with a 48.2% share owned by Troms Kraft.

== See also ==
- Kvænangsbotn Hydroelectric Power Station
- Lassajavre Hydroelectric Power Station
