= Ruijan Suomenkielinen Lehti =

Finnish language newspaper in Norway

Ruijan Suomenkielinen Lehti was a Finnish language weekly newspaper published in Vadsø in Norway.

== History and profile ==
Ruijan Suomenkielinen Lehti was started in 1877 as a weekly newspaper for the Finnish-speaking immigrants in Vadsø Municipality and Sør-Varanger Municipality. The editor wanted citizens of Finland to buy it as well. The paper was published by the Kven merchant Israel Bergström, with assistance from teacher J. G. Cajan from Helsinki. It had a mix between news, information directed towards Kvens and advertisements.

Ruijan Suomenkielinen Lehti was very controversial in its time. The paper was boycotted by most Norwegian advertisers in the district. Official people in the district, among others the priest and sexton, reportedly vowed to counteract the newspaper. One of the few Norwegians who publicly supported the newspaper's existence was the local politician (later MP) Karl Akre. Ruijan Suomenkielinen Lehti went defunct later in 1877 after 26 issues.

Finnish speakers in the area later imported the magazine Kaiku, published in Oulu.

== See also ==
- Ruijan Kaiku
