= Cårrujavrit Hydroelectric Power Station =

Cårrujavrit Power Station
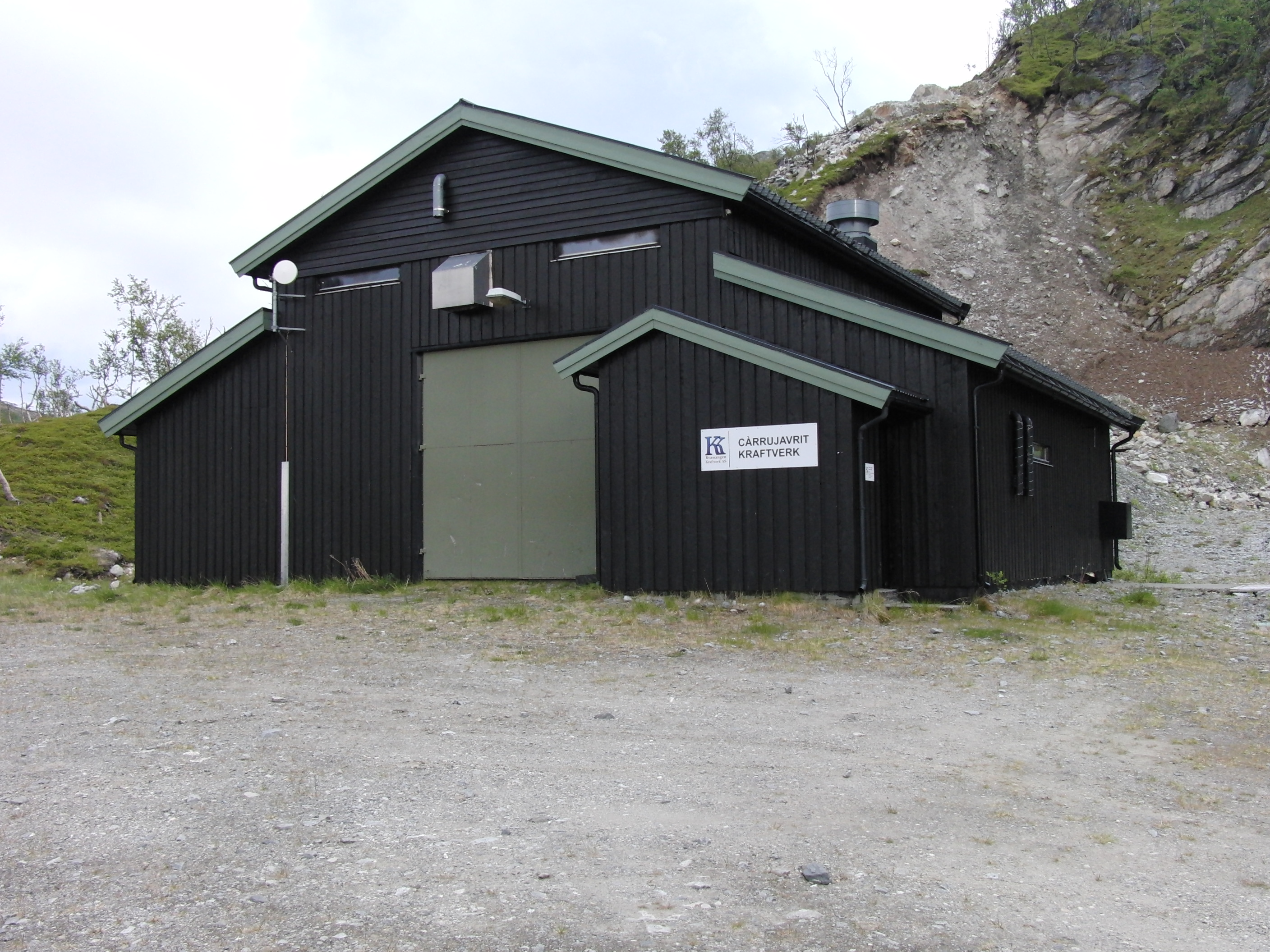
- Official name: Cårrujavrit kraftverk
- Country: Norway
- Location: Kvænangen, Troms
- Coordinates: 69°41′30″N 22°09′39″E
- Status: Operational
- Owner: Kvænangen Kraftverk AS

Power Station
- Hydraulic head: 305 m
- Turbines: 1
- Pump-generators: 0
- Pumps: 0
- Installed capacity: 1.7 MW
- Capacity factor: 73.9%
- Annual generation: 11 GW·h

The Cårrujavrit Hydroelectric Power Station (Norwegian: Cårrujavrit kraftverk or Čårrujavrit kraftverk) is a hydroelectric power station in Kvænangen Municipality in Troms county, Norway. It utilizes a drop of 305 meters (1,001 ft) between its intake reservoir on the Njemenaiko River (Norwegian: Njemenaikoelva, Kven: Niemenaikunjoki, Northern Sami: Njemenjáikojohka) and Little Lakes (Norwegian: Småvatnan, Kven: Pikkujärvet, Northern Sami: Čorrojávrrit), which is also the reservoir for the Kvænangsbotn Hydroelectric Power Station. Lake Tjoika (Kven: Sueikkajärvi or Hyttysenjärvi, Northern Sami: Šuoikkatjávri) serves as the reservoir for the plant and is regulated at a level between 529 m (1,736 ft) and 516 m (1,693 ft). The plant has a Francis turbine and operates at an installed capacity of 1.7 MW, with an average annual production of about 11 GWh. The plant is controlled by Kvænangen Kraftverk AS, with a 48.2% share owned by Troms Kraft.
