= Børselva =

River in Finnmark, Norway

Børselva (Norwegian); Bissojohka (Northern Sami); Pyssyjoki (Kven)
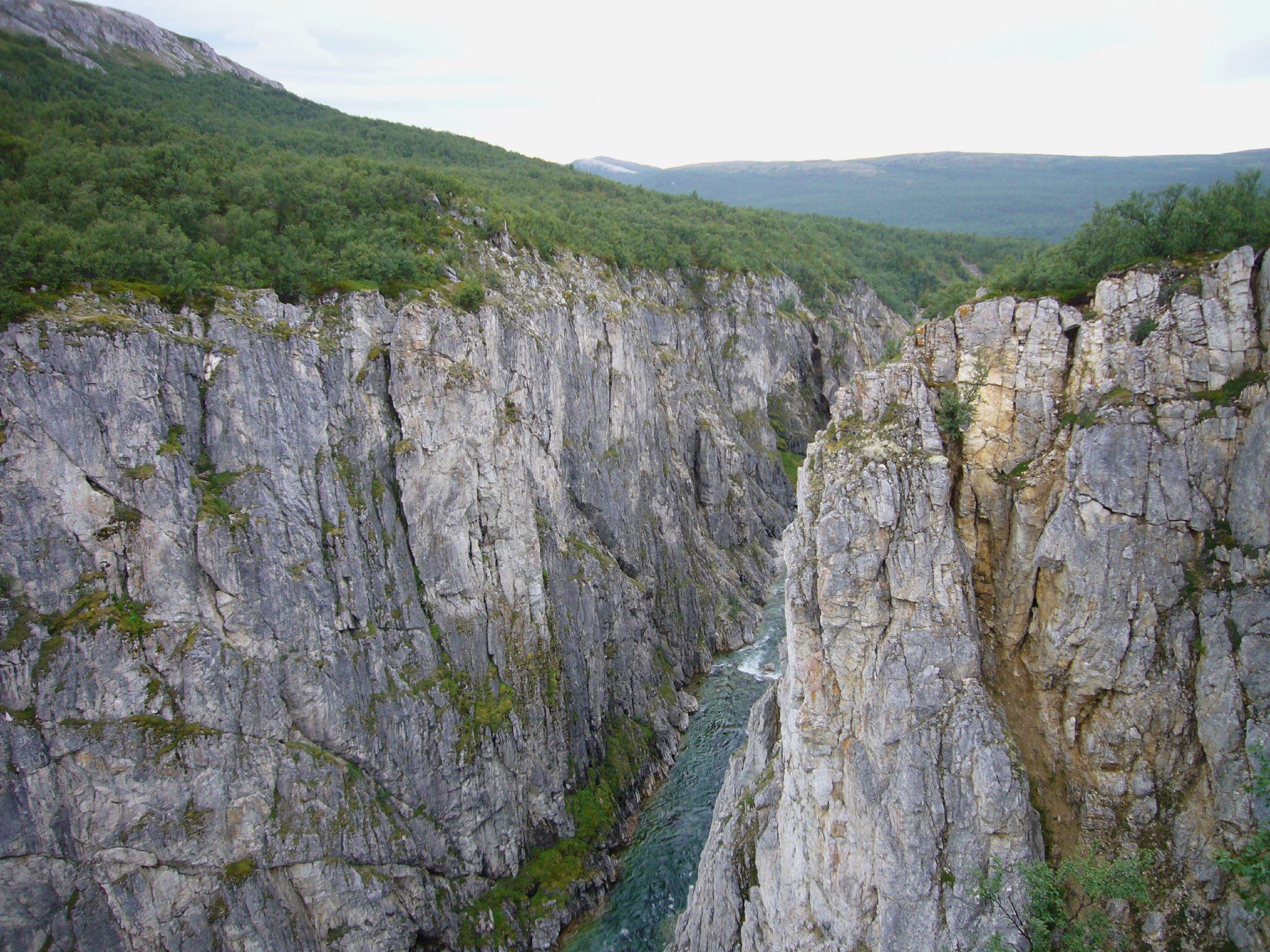
- View of the canyon surrounding the river

Location
- Country: Norway
- County: Finnmark
- Municipality: Porsanger Municipality

Physical characteristics
- Source: Bissojávri
  - location: Porsanger, Finnmark, Norway
  - coordinates: 69°33′09″N 30°35′11″E
  - elevation: 173 m (568 ft)
- Mouth: Børselv
  - location: Porsanger, Finnmark, Norway
  - coordinates: 70°19′03″N 25°33′58″E
  - elevation: 0 m (0 ft)
- Length: 76.2 km (47.3 mi)
- Basin size: 882.81 km^{2} (340.85 sq mi)
- Discharge
  - location: Børselv
  - average: 18.47 m^{3}/s (652 cu ft/s)

Børselva (Norwegian), Bissojohka (Northern Sami), or Pyssyjoki (Kven) is a river in Porsanger Municipality in Finnmark county, Norway. The 76.2-kilometre (47.3 mi) long river runs from the mountains down to the village of Børselv, and it then empties out into the Porsangerfjorden. The river has a 882.81-square-kilometre (340.85 sq mi) watershed and at the mouth, the water discharges at a rate of 18.47 cubic metres per second (652 cu ft/s).

This area has three productive salmon rivers, the other two being Lakselva (which literally means the salmon river) and Stabburselva. The river has good grilse runs and salmon weighing around 10 kilograms (22 lb) are annually caught here.

The Børselva river runs through the Silfar canyon where the water is emerald green in colour and crystal clear. That is one of the deepest canyons in Europe.
