= Børselv Church =

Church in Finnmark, Norway

- Børselv kirke
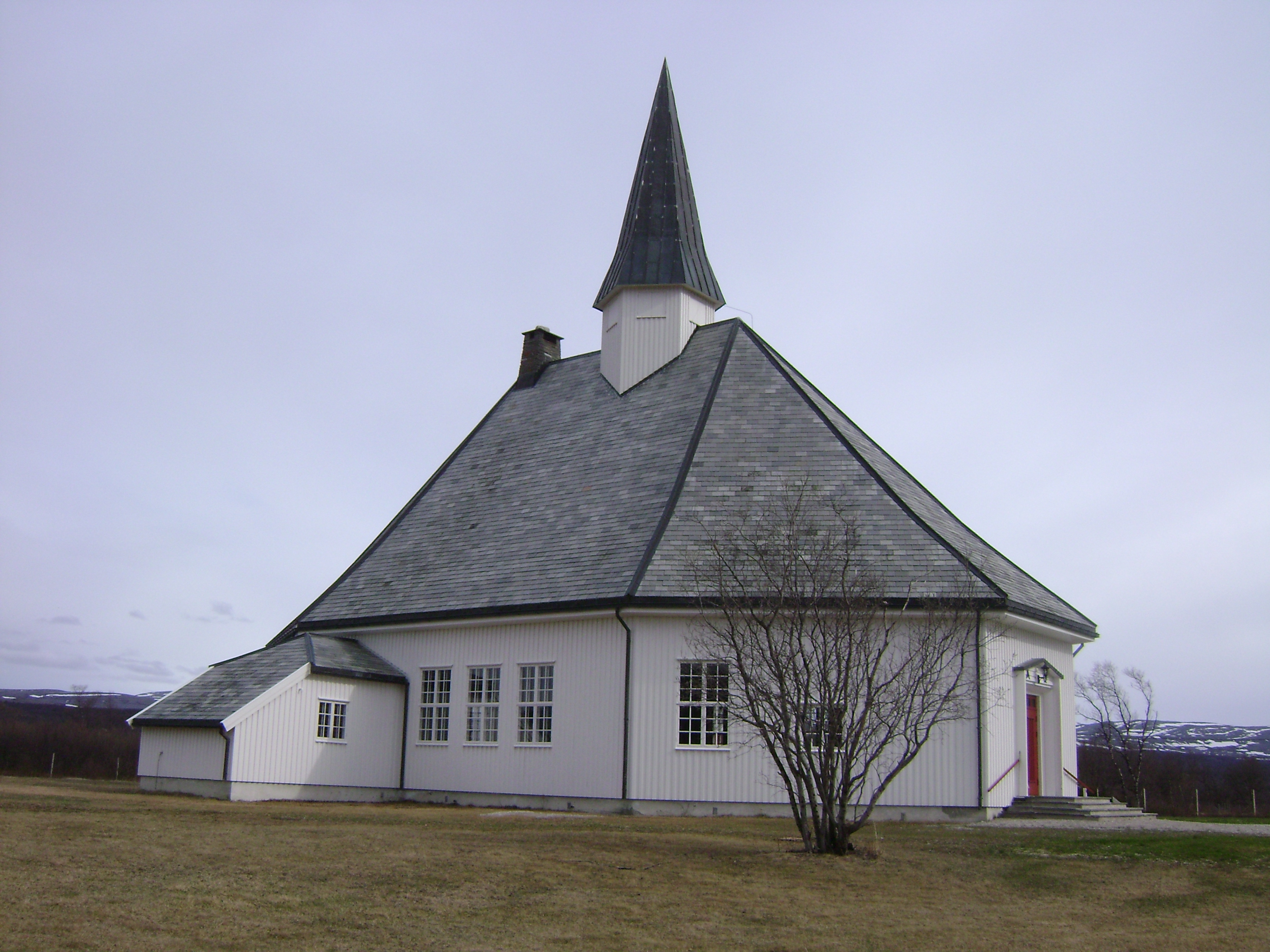
- View of the church
- Børselv Church
- 70.317178°N 25.5421159°E
- Location: Porsanger Municipality, Finnmark
- Country: Norway
- Denomination: Church of Norway
- Churchmanship: Evangelical Lutheran

History
- Former name: Børselv kapell
- Status: Parish church
- Founded: 1909
- Consecrated: 16 March 1958

Architecture
- Functional status: Active
- Architect: Valdemar Scheel Hansteen
- Architectural type: Octagonal
- Completed: 1958 (68 years ago)

Specifications
- Capacity: 300
- Materials: Wood

Administration
- Diocese: Nord-Hålogaland
- Deanery: Indre Finnmark prosti
- Parish: Porsanger
- Norwegian Cultural Heritage Site
- Type: Church
- Status: Not protected
- ID: 84002

Børselv Church (Norwegian: Børselv kirke) is a parish church of the Church of Norway in Porsanger Municipality in Finnmark county, Norway. It is located in the village of Børselv. It is one of the churches for the Porsanger parish which is part of the Indre Finnmark prosti (deanery) in the Diocese of Nord-Hålogaland. The white, wooden church was built in an octagonal style in 1958 using plans drawn up by the architect Valdemar Scheel Hansteen. The church seats about 300 people.

== History ==
The first chapel in Børselv was built in 1909 by the architect K. Tessan. It was originally founded as a Sami mission chapel, called Børselv kapell. The chapel was burned down in 1944 when the retreating German army burned most buildings in Finnmark. After the war when funds were available (in 1957–1958), the church was rebuilt. The new church was consecrated on 16 March 1958.

== See also ==
- List of churches in Nord-Hålogaland
