= Gandvik =

Dangerous sea in Norse mythology

Gandvik (northern sámi: Juvravuonna, kvääni: Juuriperä) is a city in Nesseby. The name is a compound of the words gand, and vik, meaning bay.

In Norse mythology, Gandvík is a dangerous sea, known as the "Bay of Serpents" because of its tortuous shape.

The 12th-13th century Dane Saxo Grammaticus stated that Gandvik was an old name for the Baltic Sea (a name misspelt Grandvik in some translations). The legend presumably refers to the Gulf of Bothnia. However, there are two opposite theories about where Gandvik was situated, based on the 1323 Treaty of Nöteborg: in the Arctic Ocean or the Gulf of Bothnia. Starting from the 1850s, the former received more support, in that Sweden had extended far out to the Arctic Ocean, but since the 1920s the latter has gained more support. However, Hversu Noregr byggðist, dating from the former part of the 13th century, is by most opinions referring to the White Sea when it uses the term Gandvik.
