= Lassajavre Hydroelectric Power Station =

Lassajavre Power Station
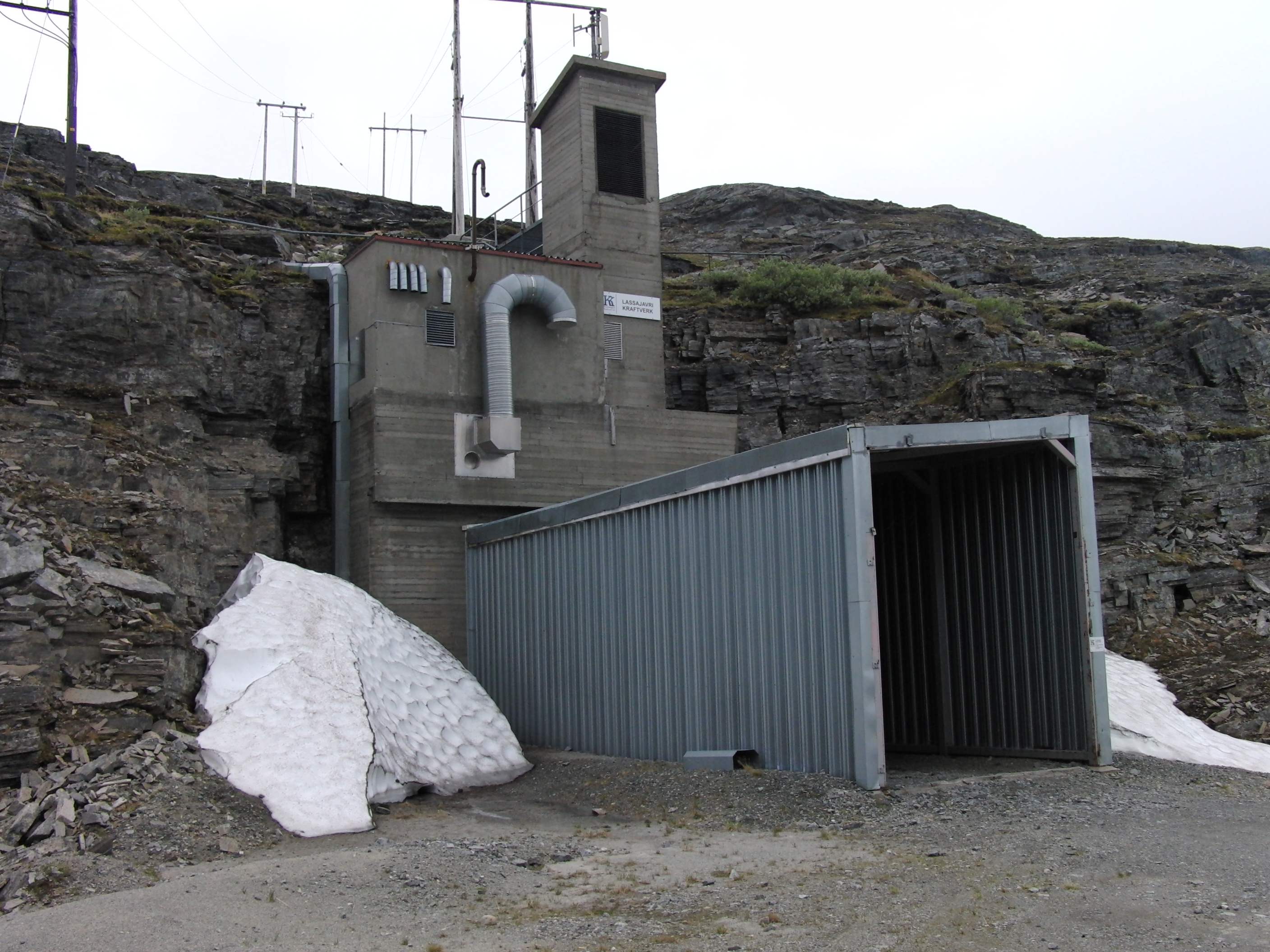
- Official name: Lassajavre kraftverk
- Country: Norway
- Location: Kvænangen, Troms
- Coordinates: 69°39′38″N 22°13′12″E
- Status: Operational
- Opening date: 1977; 48 years ago
- Owner(s): Kvænangen Kraftverk AS

Upper reservoir
- Creates: Lake Abo

Lower reservoir
- Creates: Lake Lassa

Power Station
- Turbines: 1 × 7.2 MW
- Installed capacity: 7.2 MW
- Capacity factor: 47.6%
- Annual generation: 30 GW·h

The Lassajavre Hydroelectric Power Station (Norwegian: Lassajavre kraftverk or Lassajavrre kraftverk) is a hydroelectric power station in Kvænangen Municipality in Troms county, Norway. The plant utilizes a drop between Lake Abo (Kven: Aapujärvi, Northern Sami: Ábojávri) and Lake Lassa (Kven: Lassojärvi, Northern Sami: Lássájávri). Lake Abo is regulated at a level between 689 meters (2,260 ft) and 669 m (2,195 ft), and Lake Lassa serves as the reservoir for the Småvatna Hydroelectric Power Station. The Lassajavre plant also utilizes water from Lake Mollis (Kven: Mollisjärvi, Northern Sami: Stuora Mollešjavri) and Lake Sarves (Kven: Kolmas Hirvasjärvi, Northern Sami: Sarvvesjávri). The plant came into operation in 1977. It has a Francis turbine and operates at an installed capacity of 7.2 MW, with an average annual production of about 30 GWh. The plant is controlled by Kvænangen Kraftverk AS, with a 48.2% share owned by Troms Kraft.
