= Bugøynes Chapel =

Church in Finnmark, Norway

- Bugøynes kapell
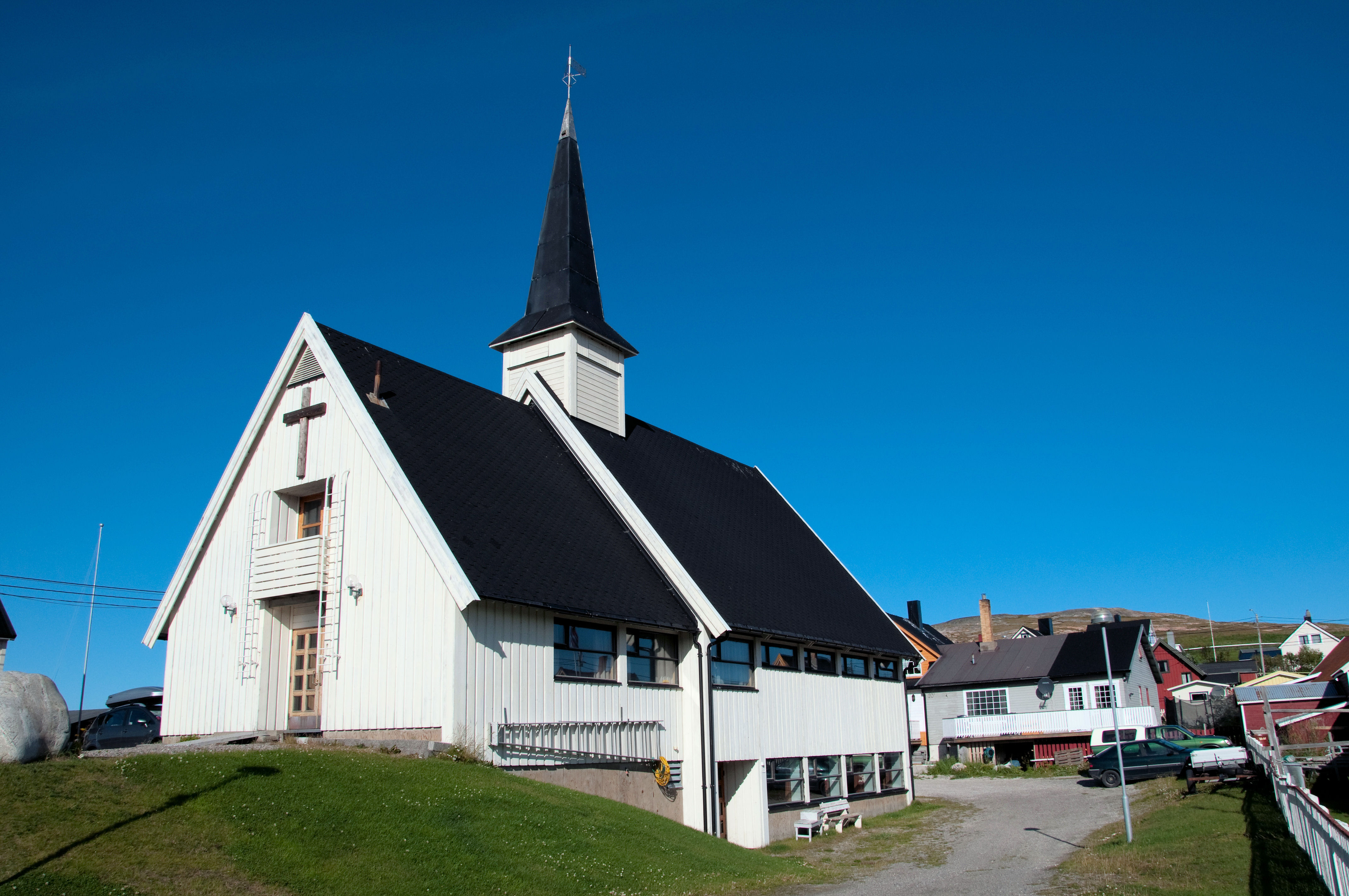
- View of the church
- Bugøynes Chapel
- 69.972861°N 29.634694°E
- Location: Sør-Varanger, Finnmark
- Country: Norway
- Denomination: Church of Norway
- Churchmanship: Evangelical Lutheran

History
- Status: Chapel
- Founded: 1989

Architecture
- Functional status: Active
- Architect(s): Lien & Risan
- Architectural type: Long church
- Completed: 1989 (37 years ago)

Specifications
- Capacity: 150
- Materials: Wood

Administration
- Diocese: Nord-Hålogaland
- Deanery: Varanger prosti
- Parish: Sør-Varanger

Bugøynes Chapel (Norwegian: Bugøynes kapell) is a chapel of the Church of Norway in Sør-Varanger Municipality in Finnmark county, Norway. It is located in the village of Bugøynes. It is an annex chapel for the Sør-Varanger parish which is part of the Varanger prosti (deanery) in the Diocese of Nord-Hålogaland. The white, wooden chapel was built in a long church style in 1989 by the architecture firm Lien & Risan Arkitektkontor. The church seats about 150 people. The church holds one regularly scheduled worship service each month.

== See also ==
- List of churches in Nord-Hålogaland
