= Norwegian Kven Organization =

Norwegian organization

Logo of the Norwegian Kven Organization

The Norwegian Kven Organization (Kven: Ruijan kvääniliitto, Norwegian: Norske kveners forbund) was established in 1987, and has about 1000 members. The organization has local branches in Skibotn, Børselv, Nord-Varanger, Tana, Lakselv, Alta, northern Troms, Tromsø, and Østlandet.

The tasks of the organization include working for a government report about the history and rights of the Kven people, improving the media coverage of Kven issues, and for the Norwegian government to establish a State Secretary for Kven issues. In addition, its goals include establishing reading and writing classes at the beginner to advanced level and a Kven kindergarten, and to incorporate the Kven language at all levels of education in Norway. It also aims to establish a Kven culture fund, road and other signs in Kven, Kven names on official maps, and museums and centers for Kven language and culture.

The organization owns a portion of the shares of the Kven newspaper Ruijan Kaiku.
