= Arctic view =

Viewpoint and restaurant in Norway

Coordinates: 71°0′19.63″N 24°37′2.18″E

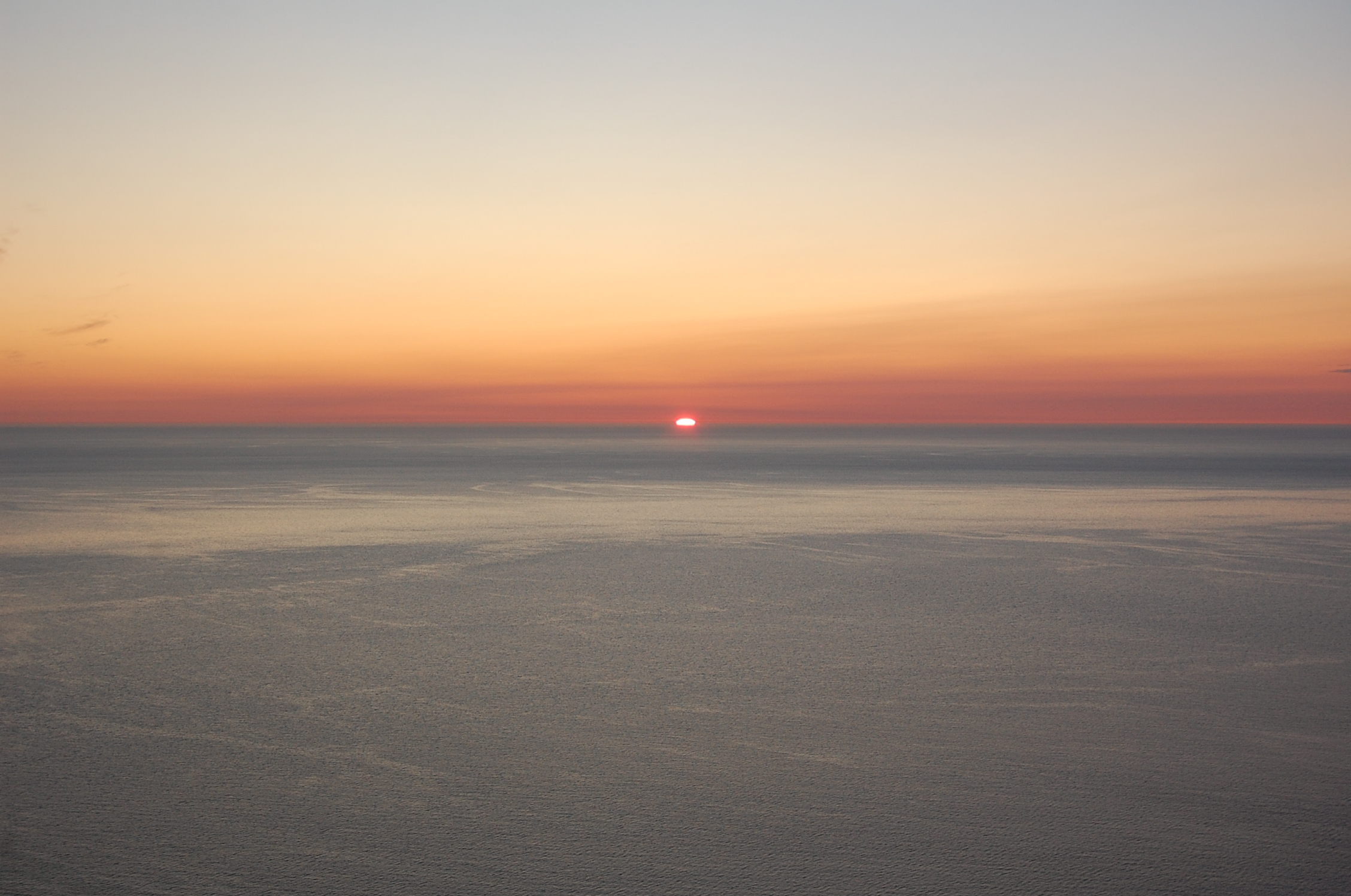
August sunset seen from Arctic View

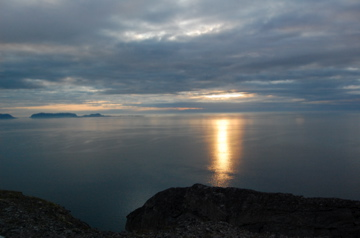
View towards Ingøya seen from Arctic View

Arctic View is the name of a viewpoint and restaurant located on the northwestern tip of the island of Havøya in Måsøy Municipality in Finnmark county, Norway. The restaurant is located 5 kilometres (3.1 mi) northwest of the village of Havøysund, the administrative centre of the municipality.

On the way to Arctic View, one drives through a wind farm that was built by Norsk Hydro. Here, at the edge of the Barents Sea, there is a view of the western part of Finnmark county, and the place is a popular spot to watch the midnight sun, which can be seen from May 14 to July 31. The sun reaches its lowest point at 12:14–12:24 a.m. The most famous and popular place to view the midnight sun, North Cape, is located about 50 kilometres (31 mi) to the northeast.

Arctic View is owned by Måsøy Municipality and it is a cooperation between the municipality and the companies Arctic Wind, Repvåg Kraftlag, Asplan Viak, and NCC Norway.
