= Truth and Reconciliation Commission (Norway) =

The Commission to Investigate the Norwegianisation Policy and Injustice Against the Sámi and Kven/Norwegian Finnish Peoples (The Truth and Reconciliation Commission) was a Norwegian state commission established by the Storting in 2018. It was led by Dagfinn Høybråten and with a committee consisting of eleven other professionals.

The purpose of the investigation was to lay the foundation for recognition of the experiences of Sámi and Kven (Norwegian Finns) subject to Norwegian authorities' policies of Norwegianization, and the consequences these experiences have had for them as groups and individuals. On 9 May 2019, the commission's mandate was extended to include the Forest Finns.

The commission completed its work and submitted the report to the Storting's Presidency on 1 June 2023. In November 2024, the Storting issued its own 17 resolutions to begin addressing the commission's findings, beginning with a formal apology to the Sámi, Kvens/Norwegian Finns, and Forrest Finns peoples.

== Mandate ==
The commission had a three-part mandate:

1. To produce a historical survey Norwegian authorities' policy and activities towards Sámi and Kvens / Norwegian Finns both locally, regionally and nationally.
2. To investigate the effects of the Norwegianization policy, including how it has affected the majority population's views of Sami, Kvens / Norwegian Finns, and the significance of Norwegianization to this day.
3. To suggest measures further reconciliation.

On 9 May 2019, the commission decided to include the Forest Finns in its mandate.

== Report ==
The commission delivered its 700-page report to the Storting at the start of June 2023. The report examined the lingering effects of official Norwegianization policies, including the ways those policies continued indirectly after the official repeal of the policies in 1963. It also identified the indirect assimilation pressures in terms of language, health and socio-politics, culture, and traditional livelihoods and businesses like Sámi reindeer herding and Kven and Sea-Sámi small-scale fisheries.

In November 2024, the Storting released its own 98-page report on the commission's findings, outlining 17 decisions the government intended to pursue to address past wrongs. The first step was the apology delivered on 12 November 2024 by First Vice President Svein Harberg on behalf of the Storting to Sámi, Kvens/Norwegian Finns, and Forest Finns. King Harald V in 2020 provided an apology to the Sámi, but this was the first apology to the Kvens and Finns.

Resolution 15: The Storting would like to express its deepest regret for the abuses that the Norwegianization policy entailed for the Sámi, Kven/Norwegian Finns and Forest Finns. The Storting hereby apologizes for the active role of previous Stortings in the Norwegianization policy, and acknowledges responsibility for the consequences of this policy for groups and individuals.

== Structure ==
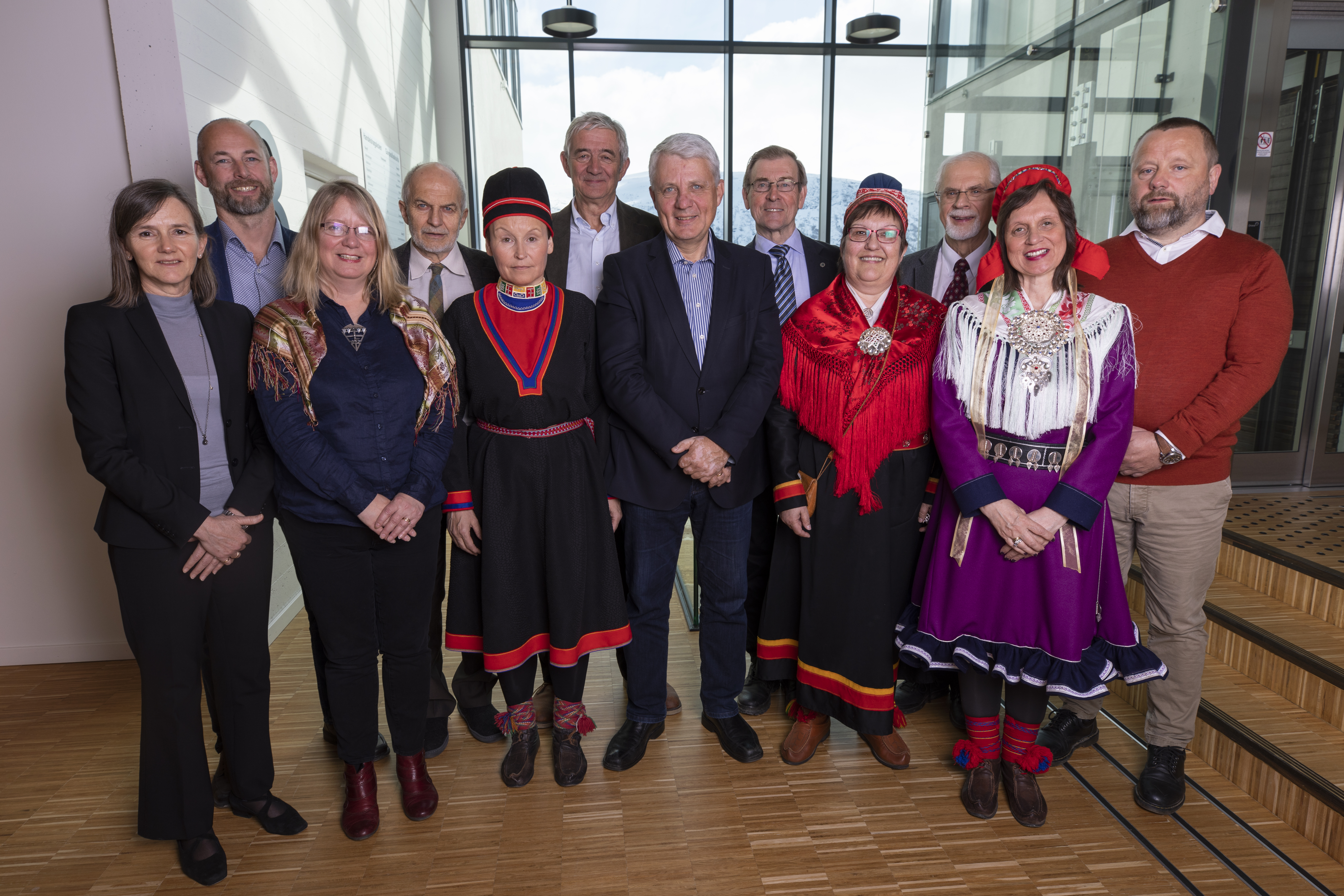
Members of the Truth and Reconciliation Commission

A secretariat for the Truth and Reconciliation Commission, headed by Liss-Ellen Ramstad, was established at University of Tromsø – The Arctic University of Norway.

=== Membership ===
- Secretary General Dagfinn Høybråten
- Professor Ivar Bjørklund
- Fellow Håkon Hermanstrand
- Bishop Emeritus Per Oskar Kjølaas
- Professor Pia Lane
- Senior advisor Anne Kalstad Mikkelsen
- Museum director Marit Myrvoll
- Professor Emeritus Einar Niemi
- Professor Anne Julie Semb
- College lecturer Liv Inger Somby
- Professor Emeritus Aslak Syse
- Associate Professor Ketil Zachariassen
