= Kainun institutti =

Center for Kven culture

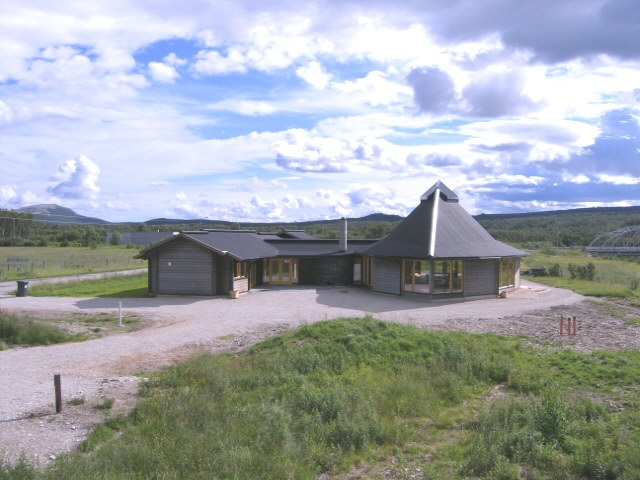
Kainun institutti.

Kainun institutti – Kvensk institutt (before 2005 known as Norsk senter for kvensk språk og kultur) is a center for Kven culture and the Kven language. It is located in Børselv in Porsangin Municipality in Finnmark county Norway. It was opened in January 2007. The chair at the institute is Hilde Skanke. In total six people are employed at the institute. Funding is provided by the Norwegian government.

The board of the institute consists of one member from: Norske Kveners Forbund/Ruijan kveeniliitto, (Porsanger) municipality, Pyssyjokilaiset and Ruijan Kväänit, University of Tromsø, and Finnmark University College.

The institute main tasks of the institute are:

- Educational and information work about the Kvens both nationally and internationally.
- Increase the usage of the Kven language locally.
- Further develop the Kven language, including writing a dictionary and education material for the Kven language.
- Cultural arrangements.

Also located at the center is the Kven language board that was established on 13 April 2007.
