= Sîrma =

- Village
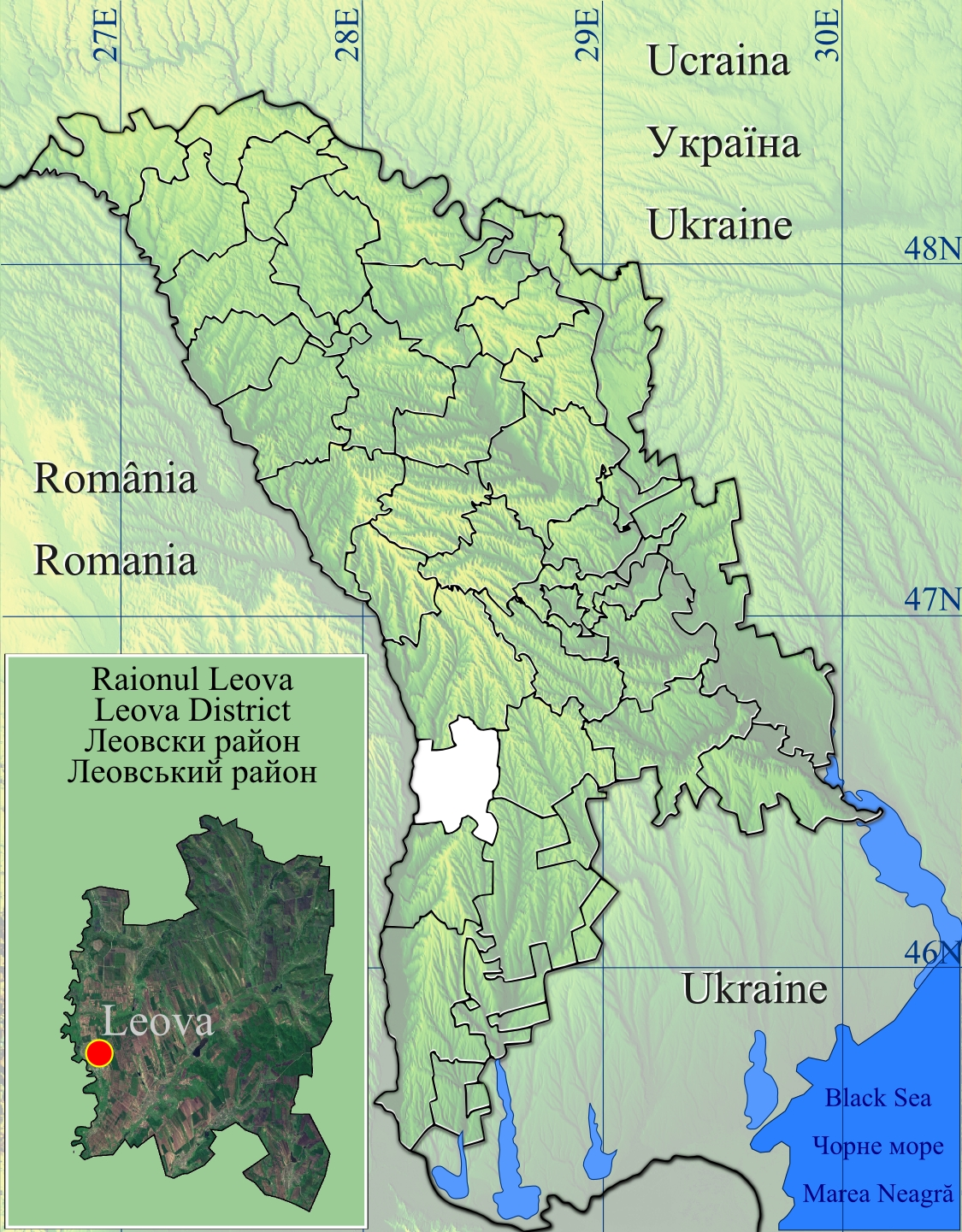
- Location within Moldova Leova
- Coordinates: 46°31′34″N 28°14′52″E
- Country: Moldova

Government
  - Mayor: Silvia Capațina (PDM)
- Elevation: 28 m (92 ft)

Population (2014 census)
  - Total: 1,045
- Time zone: UTC+2 (EET)
  - Summer (DST): UTC+3 (EEST)
- Postal code: MD-6328

Sîrma is a village in Leova District, Moldova.
