= Hjelmsøya =

Island in Måsøy, Norway

- Interactive map of Hjelmsøya

Geography
- Location: Finnmark, Norway
- Coordinates: 71.0608°N 24.6862°E
- Area: 39 km^{2} (15 sq mi)
- Length: 10 km (6 mi)
- Width: 6.7 km (4.16 mi)
- Highest elevation: 374 m (1227 ft)
- Highest point: Geitingsryggen

Administration
- Norway
- County: Finnmark
- Municipality: Måsøy Municipality

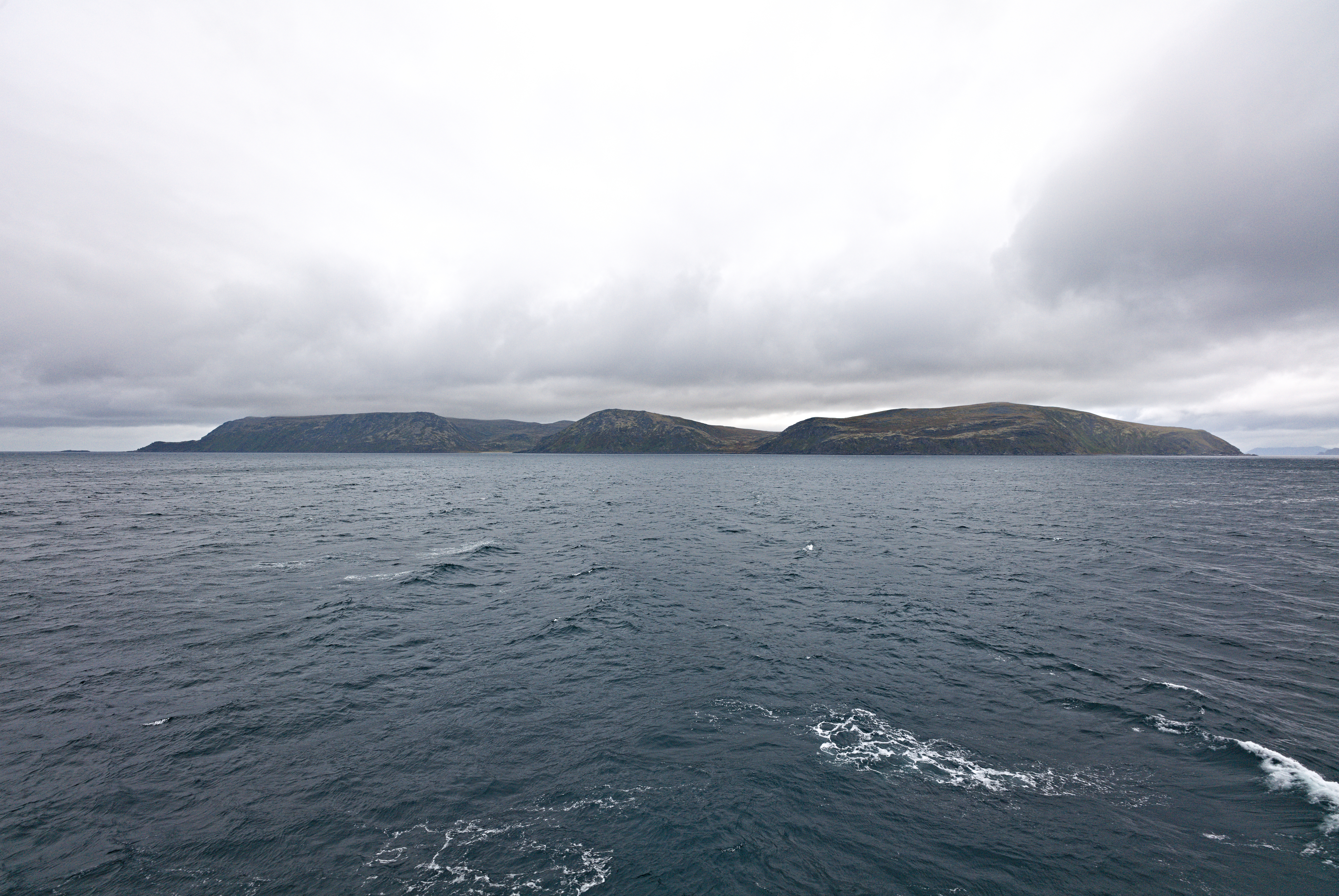
Hjelmsøya in September 2022

Hjelmsøya is an island in Måsøy Municipality in Finnmark county, Norway. The 39-square-kilometre (15 sq mi) island lies west of the islands of Måsøya and Magerøya, north of Havøya and the mainland, and east of Ingøya. The mountainous island has been uninhabited since 1967. There are connections to the island other than by private boats.

== Nature reserves ==
There are two large nature reserves on the island. The northernmost part of Hjelmsøya has a large bird cliff called Hjelmsøystauren, which is one of Norway's most important breeding colonies of guillemots. It has been designated an Important Bird Area (IBA) by BirdLife International. The other one is at Sandsfjord, a fjord surrounded by high mountain cliffs.

== See also ==
- List of islands of Norway
