= Bugøynes =

Village in Sør-Varanger, Norway

Bugøynes: Bugøynes (Norwegian); Buođggák (Northern Sami); Pykeijä (Kven)
- Village
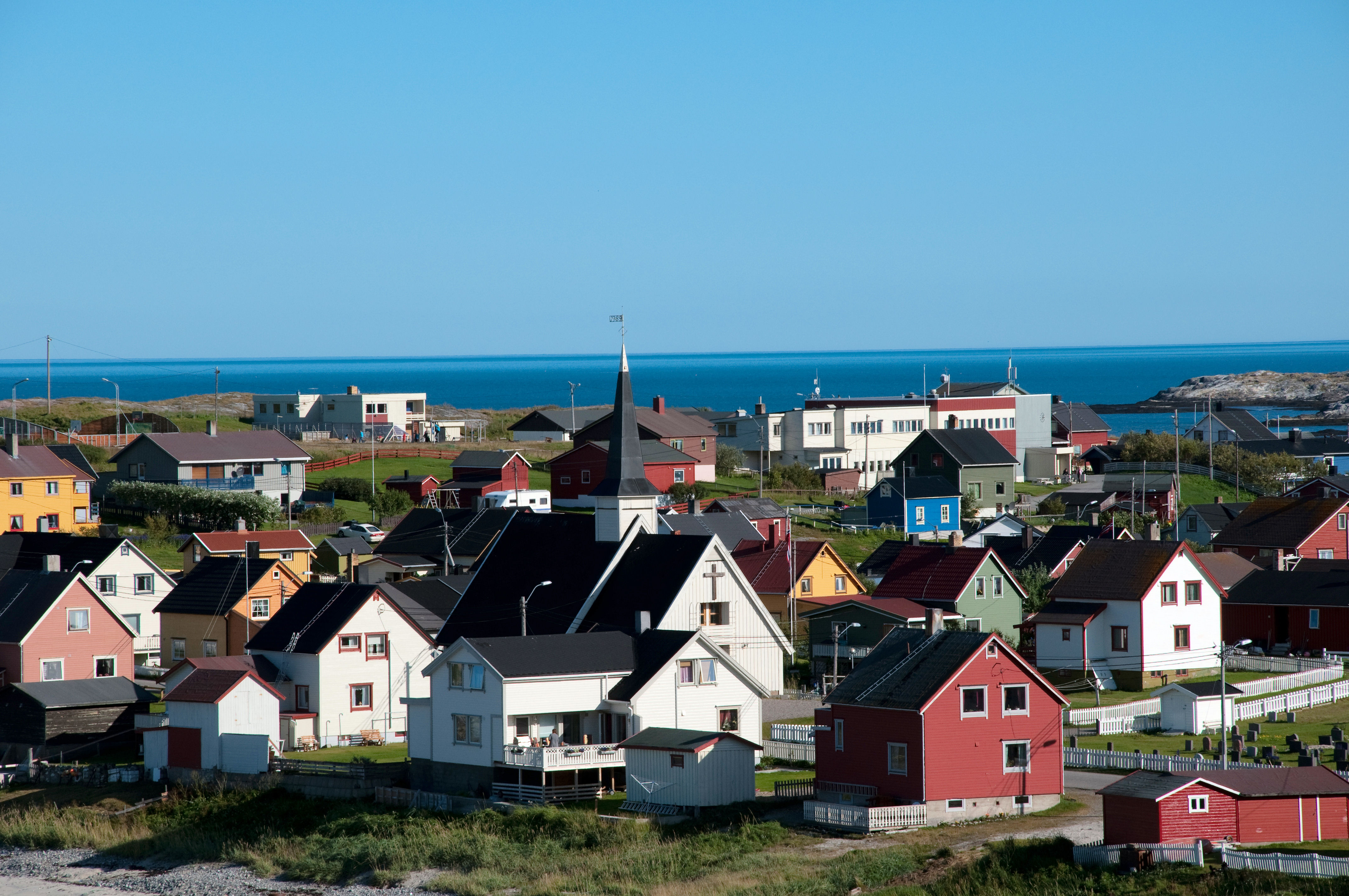
- View of the village
- Interactive map of Bugøynes
- Location within Finnmark Location within Norway
- Coordinates: 69°58′22″N 29°38′34″E
- Country: Norway
- Region: Northern Norway
- County: Finnmark
- District: Øst-Finnmark
- Municipality: Sør-Varanger Municipality
- Elevation: 7 m (23 ft)
- Time zone: UTC+01:00 (CET)
  - Summer (DST): UTC+02:00 (CEST)
- Post Code: 9935 Bugøynes

Bugøynes (Norwegian), Buođggák (Northern Sami), or Pykeijä (Kven) is a fishing village in Sør-Varanger Municipality in Finnmark county in northeastern Norway. The village is situated along the Varangerfjorden which is a vast bay off the Barents Sea (a part of the Arctic Ocean), near the border with Russia. The village is situated some 500 km (310 mi) north of the Arctic Circle, with nearly 230 inhabitants. The village is populated by many Finnish-speaking residents, leading to the village being referred to as Lille-Finland or "Little Finland".

== History ==
Bugøynes was settled by Norwegians in the 17th century – but later deserted. It was repopulated by people from Finland (Kven people) in the 18th century.

Bugøynes was one of very few places that was not burnt and destroyed under Operation Nordlicht, the German withdraw from the advancing Soviet 14th Army. According to local accounts, the commander of the German garrison arranged to spare the town in exchange for using the local fishing boats to evacuate his men.

Before the road was built to Bugøynes in 1962, the main link between Bugøynes and the rest of the world was by sea. The most-visited town in those days was Vadsø, across the Varangerfjorden. Although the town of Kirkenes, on the southern side of the fjord, was the local administrative centre for Bugøynes, it did not become the centre for shopping until people could reach it by car.

Now most trade in this part of Finnmark takes place in Kirkenes. Workplaces in Bugøynes include fishing, salmon and other fish processing, the processing of reindeer meat and game, as well as slipway and machine workshops. The village has one grocery shop, a post-office, a bistro and a doctor's surgery (every other Thursday). There are also a children's nursery, a school, a retirement home, a library branch (not anymore), a dentist (not anymore), and Bugøynes Chapel.

=== Name ===
The name "Bugøynes" means "bay island headland". The name is derived from bug (bay, inlet) + øy (island) + nes (headland). Bugøya (the island with several inlets) has also given its name to the neighbouring Bugøyfjord.

== Sights ==
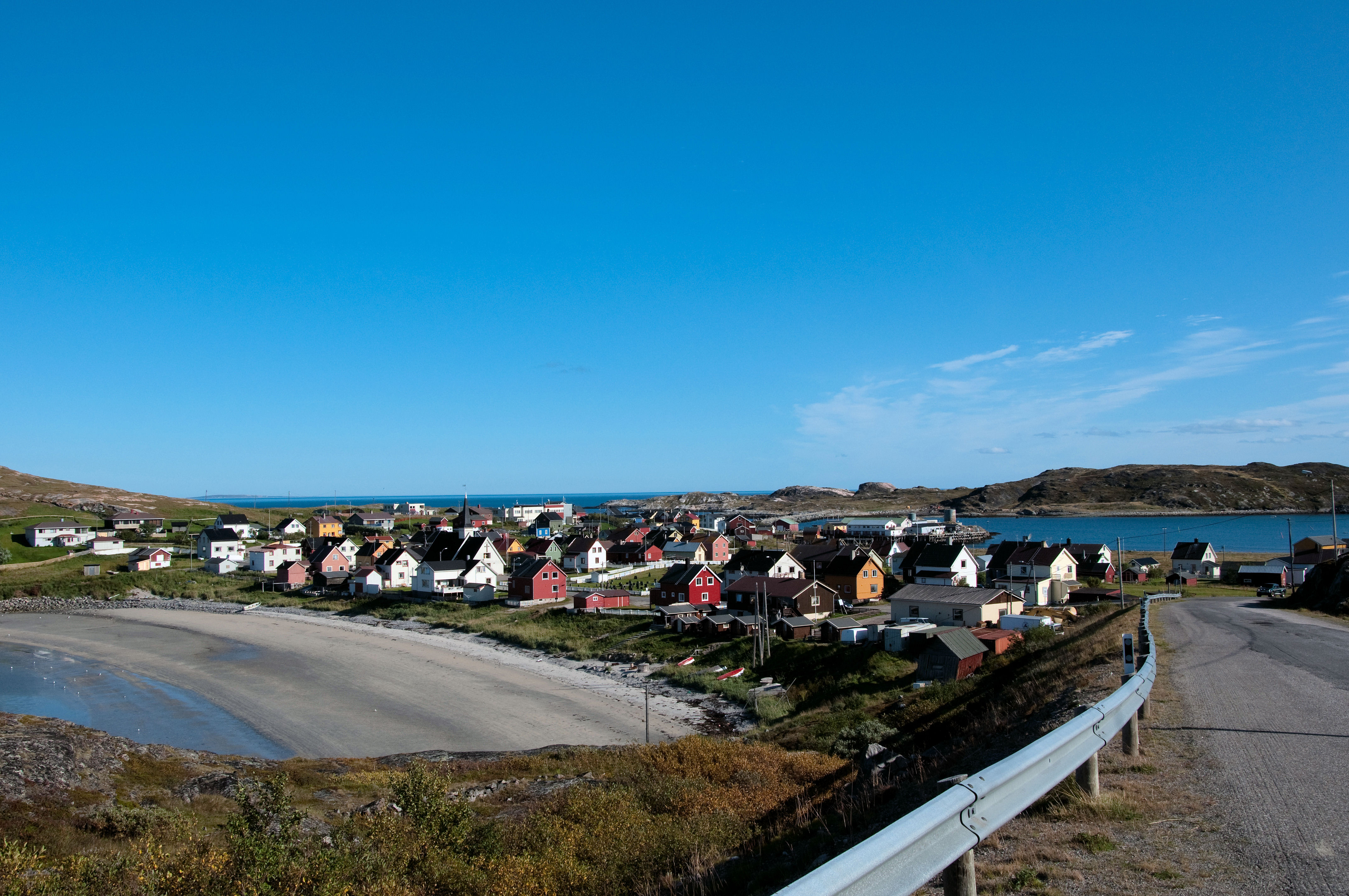
Bugøynes seen from some distance

- The Pleym Pier. Restored piers dating back to the 19th century with a museum exhibition showing old coastal culture. Open on request.
- The Lassi House (Norwegian: Lassigården), culture house dating back to the 1850s, now used as museum and public library branch.
- Ranvika Bird Sanctuary. The largest bird sanctuary in Sør-Varanger is situated about 90 minutes' walk from Bugøynes. The footpath to the sanctuary is well marked.
- The Norway King Crab. At Bugøynes, they are now fishing and farming the red king crab, which can weigh up to 10 kilograms (22 lb). Bugøynes is a center in Norway for commercial fishing of this delicacy.
