= Korsnäs (disambiguation) =

Korsnäs may refer to:

- Korsnäs AB, a company based in Sweden
- Korsnäs, Finland, a municipality and town in Ostrobothnia
- Korsnäs, Falun, a part of the town of Falun
- Korsnäs, Uppsala kommun, a small village in the Uppsala Municipality
- a residential area in the village of Östersundom in the municipality of Sipoo in Nyland
- a village in the municipality of Nagu in Åboland
- a village in the municipality of Sauvo in Finland Proper
- a village in the municipality of Vehmaa in Finland Proper
