= Havøya =

Island in Norway

Havøya (Norwegian); Ávvá (Northern Sami)
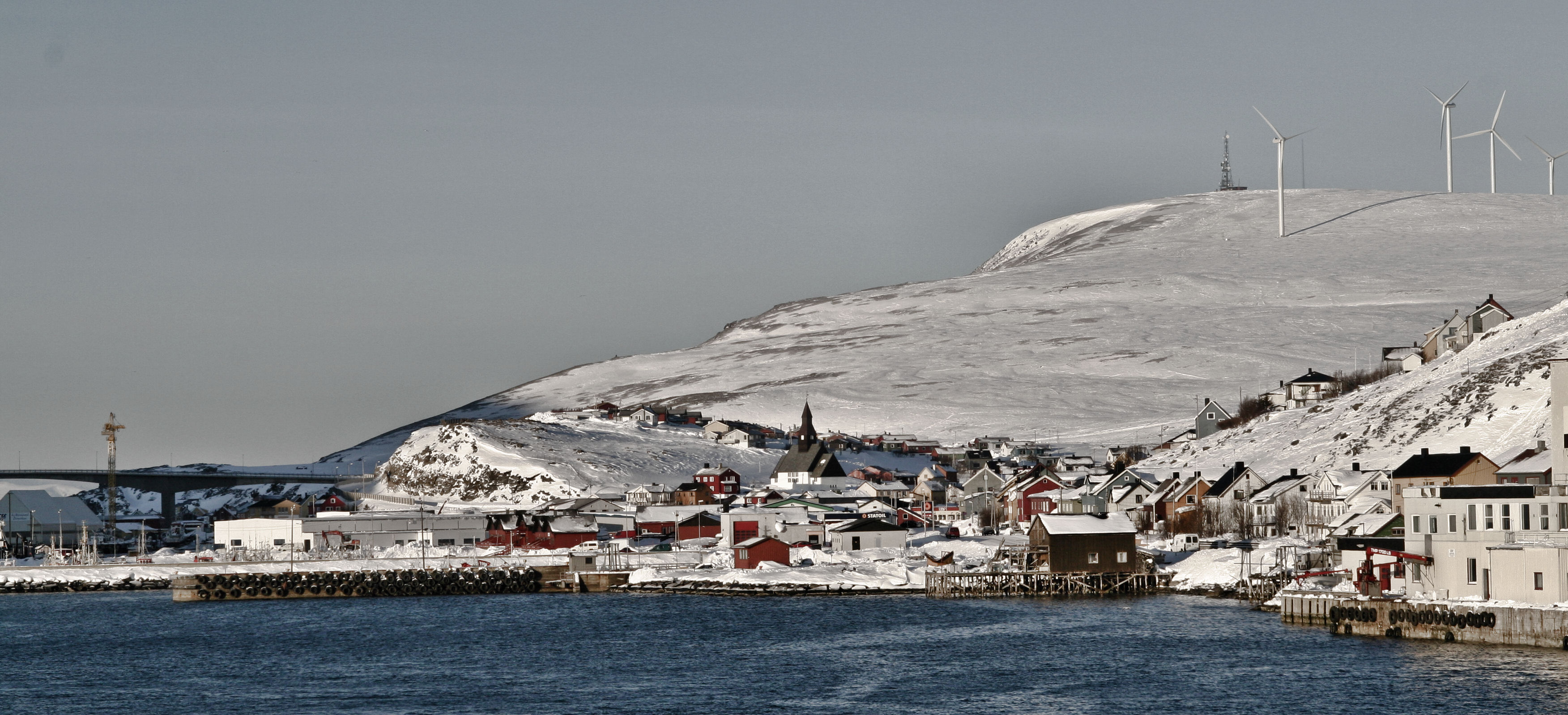
- View of the southern side of the island
- Interactive map of: Havøya (Norwegian); Ávvá (Northern Sami)

Geography
- Location: Finnmark, Norway
- Coordinates: 71.0075°N 24.6074°E
- Area: 8.28 km^{2} (3.20 sq mi)
- Length: 6.3 km (3.91 mi)
- Width: 2 km (1.2 mi)
- Highest elevation: 285 m (935 ft)
- Highest point: Havøygavlen

Administration
- Norway
- County: Finnmark
- Municipality: Måsøy Municipality

Havøya (Norwegian) or Ávvá (Northern Sami) is an island in Måsøy Municipality in Finnmark county, Norway. The island lies just off the coast of the Porsanger Peninsula with the island of Hjelmsøya to the north, Måsøya to the east, and Rolvsøya to the west. The only village on the island is Havøysund on the southern part of the island. Havøysund is the administrative centre of Måsøy Municipality, and it is the main population centre of the municipality. The island is connected to the mainland by the Havøysund Bridge along Norwegian County Road 889.

Norsk Hydro has built a windmill park on the northwestern part of the island, which has become a landmark for people at sea. The 15 windmills take 30 minutes by foot to reach from the town and are located on Havøygavlen, the highest point on the island. The Arctic view cafe and viewing area is located on the northwestern end of the island, near the windmill park, and it provides an undisturbed view towards the Barents Sea and to the surrounding arctic archipelago of Måsøya, Hjelmsøya, Ingøya, and Rolvsøya. Havøygavelen was the end of the Arctic Race of Norway competition in 2023.

== See also ==
- List of islands of Norway
