= Børselv =

Børselv Børselv (Norwegian) Bissojohka (Northern Sami) Pyssyjoki (Kven)
- Village
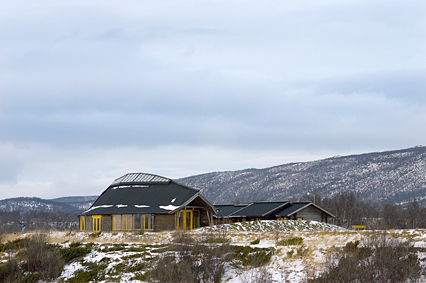
- View of the Kven Institute in Børselv
- Interactive map of Børselv
- Location within Finnmark Location within Norway
- Coordinates: 70°19′03″N 25°33′58″E
- Country: Norway
- Region: Northern Norway
- County: Finnmark
- District: Vest-Finnmark
- Municipality: Porsanger
- Elevation: 13 m (43 ft)
- Time zone: UTC+01:00 (CET)
  - Summer (DST): UTC+02:00 (CEST)
- Post Code: 9716 Børselv

Børselv (Norwegian), Bissojohka (Northern Sami), or Pyssyjoki (Kven) is a village in Porsanger Municipality in Finnmark county, Norway. It is located at the base of the Sværholt Peninsula, along the east side of the Porsangerfjorden, at the outlet of the river Børselva. The village of Brenna lies about 30 kilometres (19 mi) to the north and about 40 kilometres (25 mi) northeast of the municipal centre of Lakselv.

Børselv Church is located in this village. The area is full of Kven language-speakers and the Kvæntunet cultural and language centre for the Kven people is located in Børselv.
