= Kvens =

Balto-Finnic ethnic group

kveeni / kvääni (Kven) kvener / kvenar (Norwegian) kveanat (Northern Sami)
- Official flag (since 2017)

Total population
- 10,000–15,000; 0.2% of the Norwegian population

Regions with significant populations
- Norway (Northern Norway, particularly Finnmark and Troms)

Languages
- Kven, Sami, Norwegian

Religion
- Lutheranism, including Laestadianism

Related ethnic groups
- Finns, Peräpohjalaiset, Tornedalians, Sámi

Kvens (Kven: kvääni; Finnish: kveeni; Norwegian: kvener; Swedish: kväner; Northern Sami: kveanat) are a Balto-Finnic ethnic group in Northern Norway. In 1996, Kvens were granted minority status in Norway, and in 2005 the Kven language was recognized as a minority language in Norway.

The term Kven is sometimes used more broadly to include the Tornedalians, a closely related Balto-Finnic minority group in northern Sweden.

== Name ==
The ethnonym Cwenas is mentioned in the Old English Orosius from the 9th century, and the Old Norse forms kvenir and kvænir occur in some Icelandic sagas, such as the Orkneyinga saga and Egil's Saga. From the 16th century onward, a small number of Kvens appear in tax records from northern Norway under the names Quæn or Qvæn. The number of Kvens increased with migration from northern parts of Sweden and Finland between the 17th and 19th centuries.

Due to the Norwegianization policy that began in the late 19th century, the term Kven became to perceived as derogatory and the stigma led many to deny or conceal their identity as Kven. With the revitalization of the Kven culture in the 1970s, the term was readopted. However, even in the 1990s there was a debate whether the Norwegian terms finne, finsk, or finskætted (respectively a Finnish person, Finnish, and of Finnish origin) should be used instead. Today, the term Kven is used as an official designation, and also within the group itself. However, there are people with Kven heritage who prefer to be called Norwegian Finns or use the name kainulaiset instead.

== Demographics ==
In 2001, the number of Kvens was estimated to be about 10,000 to 15,000 in a parliamentary inquiry on national minorities in Norway. However, estimating the number of Kvens is difficult since there is no official definition of a Kven. Kven organizations have estimated the number to be 30,000–50,000. Some studies have estimated the number of Kvens to be about 50,000–60,000, based on the criteria that at least one grandparent spoke Kven. Many Kvens identify as Norwegian, Sami, or a combination of both, in addition to their Kven identity.

Depending on the criteria used, the number of people who speak Kven today is between 2,000 and 8,000.

== History ==
=== Early mentions ===
Historical mentions of Kvens appear in Norse and Anglo-Saxon literature from the 9th to 13th centuries. Texts like Egil's Saga describe the Kvens as a people residing east of the Norwegians, sometimes acting as allies and other times as adversaries. These early sources generally place Kvenland somewhere east of the Scandinavian mountains, possibly along the northern coast of the Bothnian Bay. However, these references are not evidence of permanent settlement in present-day Norway.

=== 16th–19th centuries ===
While Kvens may have been present in northern Norway earlier, the first concrete evidence dates of their presence dates to the 1520s, when a few individuals described as "Quæn" or "Qvæn" appeared in Dano–Norwegian tax censuses. Further, the 1539 map of Scandinavia by Olaus Magnus also shows a possible Kven settlement, "Berkara Qvenar", located between today's Tromsø and Lofoten. Kvens of this time are often considered to be connected to the birkarl organization in northern Sweden. In some early documents Kvens are grouped together with the Sami people, the indigenous people of Central and Northern Norway.

Larger waves of Kven migration to Norway began in the early 18th century. While traditional explanations often cite crop failures and the aftermath of the Great Northern War (1700–1721) in Finland, more recent scholarship also highlights the population growth in Finnish farming villages as a driving force which led people to seek new opportunities further north. The Kven settlers came primarily from Finnish-speaking areas in the Torne Valley, northern Ostrobothnia, and Kainuu. They established themselves along the fjords of Finnmark and northern Troms, as well as in the interior of Finnmark, favoring areas best suited for agriculture. Their livelyhoods often combined agriculture with fishing in both fjords and the rivers.

During this period, the border between Norway and Sweden had not yet been defined in the North Calotte region, and Norwegian authorities welcomed the Kvens as settlers, as they could help prevent territorial claims by Sweden or Russia to a "non-inhabited land". A notable early political event was the delegation led by Knut Olsen Kven to Copenhagen, resulting in an oath of loyalty by the Kvens to the Danish King, and royal support for Kven settlement in Alta. The settlers were also considered industrious and skillful farmers and craftsmen, who brought important new skills and economic growth to the region.

A new wave of Kven immigration began around 1830, driven by economic opportunities. The 1826 establishment of the Kåfjord Copper Works in Alta created a demand for labor, leading to the recruitment of workers from the Torne Valley and Finnish Lapland. By 1840, the fishing industry in the Varangerfjord further attracted immigrants, particularly to Vadsø and the fishing communities of Eastern Finnmark. During this period, Kvens diversified their occupations, becoming not only craftsmen, laborers, and domestic servants in growing towns and fishing villages, but also Arctic sea captains.

Throughout the 18th and 19th centuries, the Kven population steadily increased. The Kvens were registered as a separate group in the Norwegian censuses in the period 1845 to 1930. In 1845 13.3% of the population in Finnmark, and 3.2% in Troms, considered themselves as Kvens. In 1854 the numbers increased to respectively, 19.9% and 7.0%. The largest Finnish migrations occurred during the Great Famine in 1865–1870 and the number of Kvens peaked in 1875, with respectively 24.2% and 7.7%. By the late 19th century, Kvens comprised the majority of the population in Vadsø.

Laestadianism played a significant role among the Finnish-speaking population.

=== Norwegianization ===
Until the mid-19th century, the attitudes of the Norwegian authorities towards the linguistic minorities were mostly positive. However, during the 19th century, and especially after 1852, Norwegian authorities began implementing a formal policy of Norwegianization as an instrument for nation-building. Schools discouraged or banned the use of Finnish and Sami, and Norwegian was enforced as the sole language of instruction and administration.

In addition, fears of a "Finnish Danger" during the rise of Finnish nationalism and the geopolitical tensions of the early 20th century intensified state efforts to assimilate Kvens into Norwegian society. As a result, many Kvens ceased passing on the language to their children, and by the mid-20th century, the Kven language was critically endangered. Parts of the Norwegiazation policy were discontinued in 1945, but in much of the country the policy was applied until mid-1980s.

The number of Kvens started to decrease after 1875. The percentages in Troms and Finnmark were reduced to 20.2% and 3.7%, in 1890, and 13.8% and 2.0% in 1900. In the 1930 census there were 8,215 registered Kvens in Troms and Finnmark. In 1950, 1,439 people reported that they used the Finnish language, in Troms (58 people) and Finnmark (1,381 people).

=== Cultural revitalization ===
Despite the assimilation pressures, many Kvens retained a distinct sense of identity. In the late 20th and early 21st centuries, a renewed interest in Kven culture and language emerged, and the Norwegian Kven Organization was established in 1987. The Sami Act guaranteed the Sami language rights in 1990, but Kven and other minority languages did not immediately obtain the same protection. The Kven language was officially recognized as a minority language in Norway under the European Charter for Regional or Minority Languages in 2005, following a debate over its status as an independent language versus a dialect.

In 2023, the Norwegian Truth and Reconciliation Commission documented the historical injustices committed against the Kvens, and the Norwegian parliament apologized for its policy of forced assimilation.

== Language ==
Kven (kvääni or kainu; Norwegian: kvensk) is a Finnic language. It is seen by some as a mutually intelligible dialect of the Finnish language, and grouped together with the Peräpohjola dialects such as Meänkieli, spoken in Torne Valley in Sweden. Kven differs from Finnish since the Kven population was in effect isolated from other Finnish-speaking people. The Kven language has come to incorporate many Norwegian loanwords, and Finnish words that are no longer used in Finland are still used. Many Kvens themselves consider it a separate language. Since 2005, it is officially recognized as a minority language in Norway within the framework of the European Charter for Regional or Minority Languages.

There are about 1,500 to 10,000 native speakers, most of whom are over the age of 60. Middle-aged speakers tend to have a passing knowledge of the language. They use it occasionally, but not frequently enough to keep it off the endangered list. People under the age of 30 rarely speak or know the language. Children in the community of Børselv can learn Kven in their primary schools. However, Finnish is the preferred language of instruction among the Kvens. 90% of the children in the county of Troms and Finnmark that had a right to choose between Finnish and Kven chose Finnish.

== Ethnic controversies ==
In the 1990s there was a debate among Kvens whether they should be considered as an ethnic group of their own, or whether they were Finnish Norwegians. As well, during the process of legal recognition of the Kven language, there was a debate as to whether it should be considered an actual language or merely a dialect of Finnish, and whether the Kven language or Kven dialect of Finnish should be taught in schools.

Kven and Sami people share a common history of Norwegianization. However, post-Norwegianization policies have treated them differently. Sami people have been recognized as the indigenous people in Northern Norway. They have their own schools and parliament, and they elect three of the six members for the board of Finnmark Estate (the organization owning about 95% of the land in the county of Finnmark). Some Kvens believe the distribution of rights and public funds has favored the Sami people too much, whereas on the Sami side there are people who think the Norwegian minority politics and public funding should focus mostly on the Sami people.

Lately, the Norwegian Kven Organization has attempted to get the Kvens recognized, similarly to the Sami people, as an indigenous people in Norway. This has made it important for some Kvens to show that their history stretches further back in time than commonly believed. There has been some recent unofficial adoption of the word "Kainu" as the new name for "Kven", in accordance with the hypotheses put forward by Finnish historians Jouko Vahtola and Kyösti Julku. Vahtola has hypothesized that words "Kven" and "Kainu(u)" are interchangeable.

In 2018, The Storting commissioned The Truth and Reconciliation Commission to lay the foundation for recognition of the experiences of the Kven subject to Norwegianization and the subsequent consequences.

== Modern recognition ==
The Kven flag was hoisted at the Kiruna City Hall in Sweden on 16 March 2013, at 11:00, in celebration and honour of the first annual Day of the Kvens. Hereafter, that date is meant to be recognised wider in the Kven communities of the north and by others as well.

The date for the occasion was chosen from the signing in 1328 of a state treaty between Sweden and the Birkarls, known as Tälje Charter ("Tälje stadga" in Swedish). In that treaty, the king of Sweden guaranteed them their trading rights in the north (translation from Latin last printed in 1995, Wallerström, page 48).

In the past, the Kven language spoken in Norway was considered a dialect of Finnish, much like the Finnic Meänkieli language spoken in northern Sweden. Today, both are officially recognised minority languages in the areas where the languages are spoken. Finnish, Meänkieli and Sami are all officially recognised minority languages in the Kiruna Municipality in Sweden.

== Culture and media ==
=== Ruijan Kaiku ===
Ruijan Kaiku is a multilingual newspaper (Kven, Finnish and Norwegian) that is published in Tromsø, Norway. Currently one issue is published each month. The newspaper writes mostly about Kven issues, and about the work of strengthening Finnish language and culture in Norway. In addition the paper has stories about other Finnish organizations in Norway, and about other Finnic minorities in the Nordic and surrounding countries. The newspaper's chief editor was Liisa Koivulehto.

=== Baaski festival ===
Baaski is a Kven culture festival held in Nordreisa Municipality. The first festival was in June 2007, but it is intended to be an annual event. The responsible organizers is Nordreisa municipality, and the first festival director was Johanne Gaup.

=== Kven costume ===
While the Kven costume (Kväänipuku) was only 'designed' in the 1990s and beginning of the 2000s it builds on older Kven fashions and is intended to strengthen Kven identity. Much of it is in a simple white colour, which beyond its historical use serves as a reminder of the reputed cleanliness of the Kvens. The silver-ware is likewise an important part of Kven clothing and the position of kvensølvesmed (Norwegian for 'kven silver smith') is an important one.

=== Kadonu Loru ===
Kadonu Loru is the only pop music single ever recorded in the Kven language. It is based on an old Kven nursery rhyme about making sausages. The artists are Karine Jacobsen and Kine Johansen respectively from Børselv and Lakselv. The single was published by Iđut.

== Organisations and institutions ==
=== The Norwegian Kven organization ===
The Norwegian Kven Organization (Ruijan kvääniliitto in Kven, Ruijan kveeniliitto in Finnish and Norske kveners forbund in Norwegian) was established in 1987, and has currently about 700 members. The organization has local branches in: Skibotn, Børselv, Nord-Varanger, Tana, Lakselv, Alta, northern Troms, Tromsø, and Østlandet.

The tasks of the organisation include working for a government report about the history and rights of the Kven population, improving the media coverage of Kven issues, and for the Norwegian government to establish a secretary (statssekretær) for Kven issues. In addition, reading and writing classes at the beginner to advanced level, establishing a Kven kindergarten, and to incorporate the Kven language in all education levels in Norway. Also, to establish a Kven culture fund, road and other signs in Kven, Kven names in official maps, and museums and centers for Kven language and culture.

=== The Kven Finn Association ===
Kven Finn Association (Finnish: Kveeni Suomi Liitto; Norwegian: Kvensk Finsk Riksforbund) is an NGO who works for the rights of the Kven and Finn people in Norway. It was founded together with similar organizations in Sweden and Finland in 1999, that jointly uses the name Kvenlandsförbundet (Kveenimaayhistys). Kvenlandsförbundet created the Kvenflagg. The Kven Finn Association as a part of Kvenlandsförbundet is administrating the participation of the Kven people at the Finno-Ugric World Congress.

The organization reports to international bodies on how Norway is living up to various International Law conventions. The organization is very much concerned about the discrimination the Norwegian authorities are directing towards the Kvens/FInns and the Saami. 100:1 in favour of the Saami in economic terms, at least.

Furthermore, the government's bad treatment of Finnish as the de-facto ethnic language for the Kvens/Finns. In this regard, the Kven Finn Association has started a grant for young students in high school to motivate more young people to learn Finnish (Finnish, Kven, or even Meänkieli).

The Kven Finn Association has local chapters all over Norway and is also active regarding reviving the folk music traditions and documenting the history of Finnish speaking people throughout Fennoscandinavia.

=== The Kven institute ===
The Kven institute (Kainun institutti in Kven/Finnish and Kvensk institutt in Norwegian) is a center for Kven culture and language located in Børselv in Porsangi Municipality (Porsanger) in Norway.

=== Kven Language Board ===
The Kven Language Board (Kven: Kieliraati, Norwegian: Kvensk språkråd) was established in April 2007. At formation, it consisted of the leader Irene Andreassen, Terje Aronsen, Prof. Anna Riitta Lindgren, Assoc. Prof. Eira Söderholm, and Pia Lane. Its first task was to create a standard for written Kven language. The Kven Language Council (Kven: Kväänin kielitinka, Norwegian: Kvensk språkting) was founded in April 2008 as a decision-making body of the Kven Language Board; members of the council are appointed by the Kven institute.

=== Halti kvenkultursenter ===
Halti kvenkultursenter is located in Nordreisa Municipality.

=== Ruija Kven museum ===
The Ruija Kven Museum is located in Vadsø.

== See also ==
- Birkarls
- Forest Finns
- Kvenland
- Kven place names
- Sámi people
- Tornedalians
