= Kven language =

Finnic language or Finnish dialect spoken in northeast Norway

Kven
- Ruija dialects
- kvääni, kainu
- Native to: Norway
- Ethnicity: Kven people
- Native speakers: 2,000–8,000 (2005?)
- Language family: Uralic: Finnic; North Finnic; Finnish; Peräpohjola; Kven

Official status
- Recognised minority language in: Norway
- Regulated by: Kven language board

Language codes
- ISO 639-3: fkv
- Glottolog: kven1236
- ELP: Kven Finnish
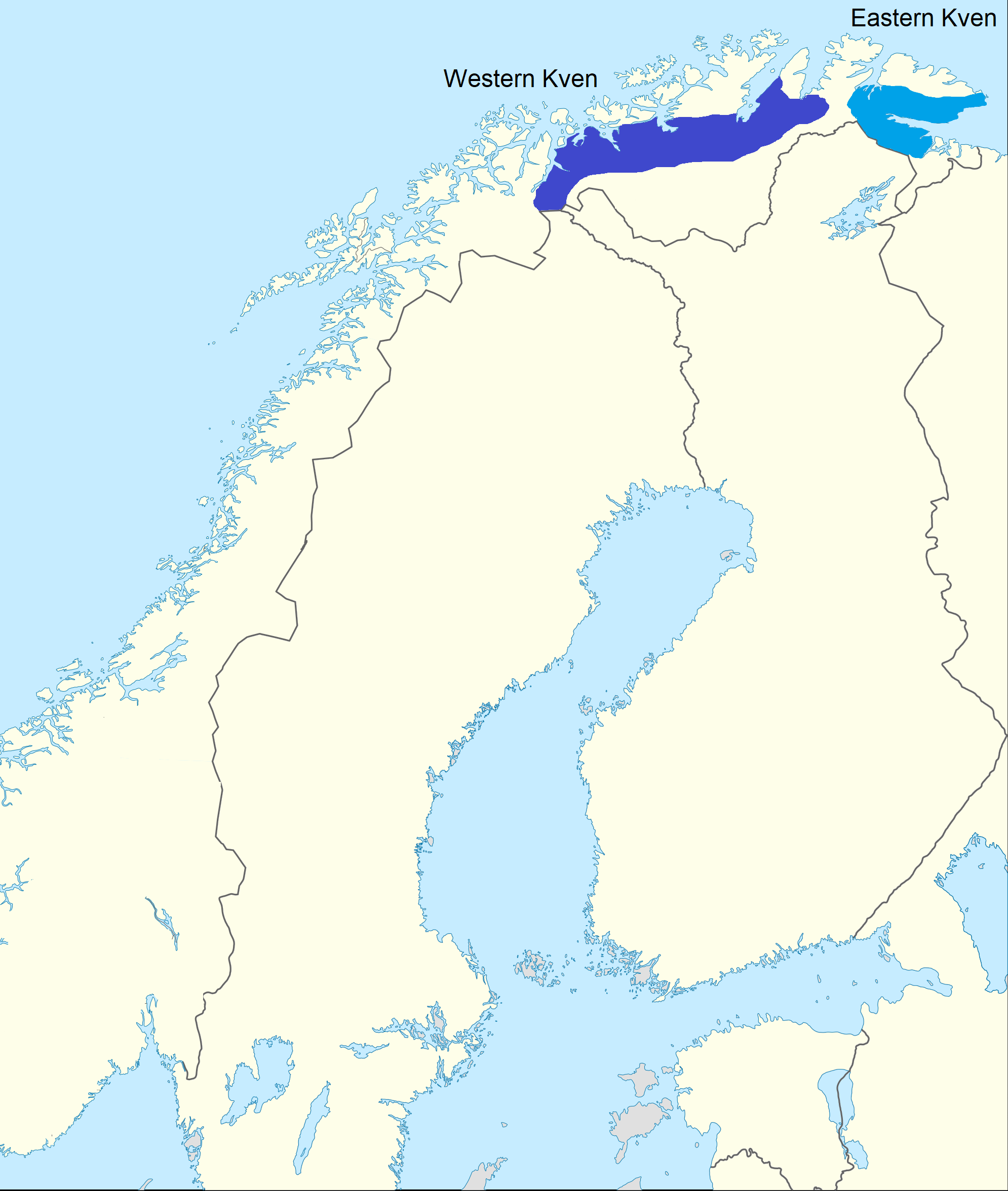

Kven (kvääni; kainu; Finnish: kveeni; Norwegian: kvensk) is a Finnic language variety spoken in the Troms and Finnmark counties of Norway by the Kven people. Its status as a distinct language versus a dialect of Finnish has been debated. It is closely related to Meänkieli, spoken in the Torne Valley in Sweden, and to the Peräpohjola dialects of Finnish spoken in Finland. Kven is treated as a separate language in Norway, where it received the status of a minority language in 2005 under the European Charter for Regional or Minority Languages.

There are about 1,500 to 10,000 known native speakers, most of whom are over the age of 60. Middle-aged speakers tend to have a passing knowledge of the language. They use it occasionally, but not frequently enough to keep it off the endangered list. People under the age of 30 rarely speak or know the language. However, children in the community of Børselv can learn Kven in their primary schools.

== History ==
The term Kven first appeared in Ohthere's tales from the 800s, along with the terms Finn and Norwegian. The area that the Kvens lived in was called Kvenland, which possibly referred to the flat areas of the Bay of Bothnia.

In Northern Norway, a small number of Kvens appear in the tax registers in the late 16th century. The Kven population increased in Norway between the 17th and 19th centuries due to migrations from northern parts of Sweden and Finland. By 1875, Kvens made up a quarter of the population in Finnmark and 8% in Troms. In the town of Vadsø (Vesisaari), Kvens accounted for nearly 60% of the population in 1870.

Until the mid-19th century, the Norwegian authorities generally held positive attitudes toward linguistic minorities, such as Kvens and the Sámi. However, from the 1850s onward, a policy of Norwegianization was implemented. Schools discouraged or banned the use of Kven (Finnish) and Sámi, and Norwegian was enforced as the sole language of instruction and administration. Because of fears of Finnish expansion into Norway, the Kvens were seen as a threat to Norwegian society and the attempt to assimilate them was much stronger than with the Sámi people.

Revitalization efforts started in the 1970s. As the Kven community continued to grow and develop a long standing culture, the name Kvens was readopted. In 1992, the European Charter for Regional and Minority Languages was enacted to protect regional and minority languages. It included Kven as a minority language; however, it was only protected under Part II. The Norwegian Kven Association deemed it important that the language be moved to Part III to obtain a stronger protection. In 2005, Kven received the status of a minority language in Norway.

== Organizations ==
The Norwegian Kven Organization was established in 1987. The organization currently (2024) has over 1200 members and about fifteen local branches. The members report to the government about the history and rights of the Kven people. The members also try and highlight Kven news by advancing Kven media coverage. The organization has also been pushing the Norwegian government to establish a state secretary for Kven issues. Moving the language of Kven into kindergarten classrooms, as well as all other education levels is also a forefront issue that the organization is aiming to tackle.

== Official status ==
Since 2006, it has been possible to study the Kven culture and language at the University of Tromsø, and in 2007 the Kven language board was formed at the Kven institute, a national centre for Kven language and culture in Børselv, Norway. The council developed a written standard Kven language, using Finnish orthography to maintain inter-Finnish language understanding. The grammar, written in Kven, was published in 2014. A Norwegian translation published in 2017 is freely available.

== Geographic distribution ==
Today, most speakers of Kven are found in two places in Norway: Storfjord Municipality and Porsanger Municipality. A few speakers can be found other places, such as Bugøynes, Neiden, Vestre Jakobselv, Vadsø, and Nordreisa.

In northeastern Norway, mainly around Varanger Fjord, the spoken language is quite similar to standard Finnish, whereas the Kven spoken west of Alta, due to the area's close ties to the Torne Valley area along the border between Finland and Sweden, is more closely related to the Meänkieli spoken there.

In government report from 2005, the number of people speaking Kven in Norway is estimated to be between 2,000 and 8,000, depending on the criteria used, though few young people speak it, which is a major obstacle to its survival.

== Phonology ==
The phonology of Kven is similar to that of Finnish. However, Kven and Finnish diverge in the phonemic realization of some words. While Standard Finnish has been replacing /ð/ with /d/, it is retained in Kven. For instance, the word syöđä ('to eat') in Kven is syödä in Finnish. In addition, due to loanwords, the sound /ʃ/ is much more common in Kven than in Finnish: for example, Kven prošekti ('project'), compared to Finnish projekti.

=== Vowels ===
Kven has 16 vowels, if one includes vowel length:

	Front		Back	
	Unrounded	Rounded	Unrounded	Rounded
Close	i iː	y yː		u uː
Mid	e eː	ø øː		o oː
Open	æ æː		ɑ ɑː	

In writing, the vowel length is indicated by doubling the letter; e.g., ⟨yy⟩ /yː/ and ⟨öö⟩ /øː/.

The graphemes representing /ø/, /æ/ and /ɑ/ are ⟨ö⟩, ⟨ä⟩ and ⟨a⟩, respectively.

The letter Đ, which is not used in standard Finnish, is used in Kven texts as of March 2025 by the Norwegian Directorate for Civil Protection (e.g. Omavalmhiuđen tarkistuslista), NRK (e.g. Pienemät piđot Hortenissa), and Kainun Institutti (e.g. Sillä heiđän kieli oon muuttunu omhaan laihiin.).

=== Consonants ===
Kven has 14 consonants found in native vocabulary, and 4 consonants found in loanwords:

		Labial	Dental	Alveolar	Postalveolar	Palatal	Velar	Glottal
Nasal		m		n			ŋ	
Plosive	voiceless	p		t			k	
Plosive	voiced	(b)		(d)			(ɡ)	
Fricative	voiceless	f		s	(ʃ ⟨š⟩)			h
Fricative	voiced		ð ⟨đ⟩					
Trill				r				
Approximant		ʋ ⟨v⟩		l		j		

/b, d, ɡ, ʃ/ are only found in loanwords.

/ŋ/ is represented in writing by ⟨n⟩ if followed by /k/, and ⟨ng⟩ if geminated; i.e., ⟨nk⟩ /ŋk/ and ⟨ng⟩ /ŋː/.

Gemination is indicated in writing by doubling the letter; e.g., ⟨mm⟩ for /mː/ and ⟨ll⟩ for /lː/.

== Grammar ==
Just like in Finnish, Kven has many noun cases. In Kven, the third person plural verb ending uses the passive form.

The word 'food' in Kven cases
case	singular	plural
nom.	ruoka	ruovat
gen.	ruovan	ruokkiin
par.	ruokkaa	ruokkii
ine.	ruovassa	ruokissa
ill.	ruokhaan	ruokhiin
ela.	ruovasta	ruokista
ade.	ruovala	ruokila
abe.	ruovatta	ruokitta
all.	ruovale	ruokile
abl.	ruovalta	ruokilta
ess.	ruokana	ruokina
tra.	ruovaksi	ruokiksi
com.	ruokine	ruokine

The letter h is also very common in Kven; there are rules on where it is used.

1. Passives – praatathaan
2. Illative cases – suomheen
3. Third infinites – praatamhaan
4. Possessive forms of words that end with s – kirvheen
5. Genitive forms of words that end with e – satheen
6. Plural past perfect and perfect – net oon ostanheet
7. Third plural ending – het syöđhään

=== Alphabet ===
Majuscule forms (also called uppercase or capital letters)
A	B	D	E	F	G	H	I	J	K	L	M	N	O	P	R	S	T	U	V	Y	Ä	Ö	Đ	Š
Minuscule forms (also called lowercase or small letters)
a	b	d	e	f	g	h	i	j	k	l	m	n	o	p	r	s	t	u	v	y	ä	ö	đ	š

25 letters are known to be used in Kven vocabulary. Some additional letters are used when using words from other languages like Norwegian and English (including C, W, and Å). Words taken directly from Norwegian (For instance titles) retain the Norwegian use of Æ and Ø, instead of turning them into Ä and Ö.

== Comparison to Standard Finnish ==
According to Katriina Pedersen, most differences with Kven and Standard Finnish are in vocabulary, for example Finnish auto 'car', in Kven is piili (from Norwegian bil).

=== Sample text ===
Kven	Finnish	English
Tromssan fylkinkomuuni oon saanu valmhiiksi mailman ensimäisen kainun kielen ja kulttuurin plaanan. Se oon seppä tekemhään plaanoi. Heilä oon esimerkiksi biblioteekkiplaana, transporttiplaana ja fyysisen aktiviteetin plaana.	Tromssan läänikunta on saanut valmiiksi maailman ensimmäisen kveenin kielen ja kulttuurin suunnitelman. Se on taitava tekemään suunnitelmia. Heillä on esimerkiksi kirjastosuunnitelma, liikennesuunnitelma ja fyysisten aktiviteettien suunnitelma.	Tromsø's county municipality has prepared the world's first Kven language and culture plan. They are skilled at making plans. They have for example a library plan, transport plan and physical activity plan.

In the above sample, some Kven terms are shared with not only Norwegian, but also Swedish (e.g. biblioteek (bibliotek), transport, kommuun (kommun), and plaan (plan, as in planning to do something)), giving Finns who learned Swedish at school a slight advantage in understanding Kven speakers, as opposed to the other way around.

The above sample from 2017 predates Ruijan Kaiku's adoption of the letter Đ, and as such the letter does not appear in the sample.

Article 1 of the Universal Declaration of Human Rights
Kven	Finnish	English
Kaikki ihmiset synnythään vaphaina, ja heilä kaikila oon sama ihmisarvo ja samat ihmisoikkeuet. Het oon saanheet järjen ja omatunnon, ja het piethään elläät toinen toisen kans niin ko veljet keskenhään.	Kaikki ihmiset syntyvät vapaina ja yhdenvertaisina arvoltaan ja oikeuksiltaan. Heille on annettu järki ja omatunto, ja heidän on toimittava toisiaan kohtaan veljeyden hengessä.	All human beings are born free and equal in dignity and rights. They are endowed with reason and conscience and should act towards one another in a spirit of brotherhood.

== See also ==
- Kven place names
