= Woodfall =

Woodfall may refer to:

== People ==
- Henry Sampson Woodfall (1739–1805), English printer and journalist
  - His brother William Woodfall (1746–1803), English printer and publisher
  - His son George Woodfall (1767–1844), English printer
- George's son Henry Dick Woodfall (1796–1869), English businessman active in Norway

== Companies ==
- Woodfall Film Productions, a British film production company

== See also ==
- Woodfalls, a village in Wiltshire, England
