= George Woodfall =

English printer (1767–1844)

George Woodfall (1767–1844) was an English printer.

== Life ==
The son of Henry Sampson Woodfall, he was his father's partner in the printing business until December 1793, when his father retired. George Woodfall later moved to Angel Court, Snow Hill, where he carried on with his business until 1840, when his eldest son, Henry Dick Woodfall, fifth in a line of printers, became his partner.

When Friedrich König, inventor of the steam printing-press, was in London in 1806, Thomas Bensley brought his fellow printers, Woodfall and Richard Taylor, into a consortium to develop a press. Woodfall, however, failed to see the potential.

Woodfall was often chosen chairman at the meetings of the London master printers. In 1812, he was elected as stock keeper of the Stationers' Company, in 1825, member of the court of assistants, and master of the company in 1833–4. He was re-elected stock keeper in 1836, and in 1841, he was elected master for the second time. In 1823, he became a fellow of the Society of Antiquaries of London, and in 1824, of the Royal Society of Literature. He served on the general committee of the Royal Literary Fund from 1820 to 1828, and, on his resignation, was elected to the council, an office which he filled until his death, with the exception of the period between March 1835 and March 1838, when he was treasurer to the corporation. He was a commissioner for the lieutenancy of the city of London. He died on 22 December 1844 at his house in Dean's Yard, Westminster.

== Identity of Junius and legacy ==
An edition of the Letters of Junius, published in 1812, was by Woodfall; John Mason Good wrote the preliminary essay and notes. John Taylor went through the files of the Public Advertiser at Woodfall's request, looking for earlier works of Junius; from the search 140 letters were marked up, and of these 113 were printed as being "by the same writer under other signatures". Some were authentic, but most were identified as the personal opinion of Woodfall and Taylor. Woodfall left it on record, on his father's authority, that Junius wrote the Letters signed "Lucius", "Brutus", and "Atticus". His father also said on the identity of Junius, to his personal knowledge, that Sir Philip Francis "did not write a line of Junius". Woodfall left in the manuscript a detailed review of John Jaques's Junius and his Works (1843), also doubting that Francis wrote the letters.

Many of Junius's letters are in manuscript, which his father had preserved, passed to Woodfall, who printed the unpublished ones and added facsimiles of the handwriting. Woodfall left these papers to his son, Henry Dick Woodfall, from whom they passed, through Joseph Parkes, to the British Museum. Another edition by John Wade of "Junius" letters was published in 1850 by Henry Bohn.

== Notes ==
Attribution

This article incorporates text from a publication now in the public domain: Lee, Sidney, ed. (1900). "Woodfall, George". Dictionary of National Biography. Vol. 62. London: Smith, Elder & Co.
