= Letters of Junius =

1769–1772 British political letters

Letters of Junius (or Junius: Stat nominis umbra) is a collection of private and open letters critical of the government of King George III from an anonymous polemicist (Junius) claimed by some to be Philip Francis (although Junius' real identity has never been verified), as well as other letters in-reply from people to whom Junius had written between 1769 and 1772. The collection was published in two volumes in 1772 by Henry Sampson Woodfall, the owner and editor of a London newspaper, the Public Advertiser.

The collection includes 69 letters, 29 to the Printer of the Public Advertiser originally intended for public readership, with the remaining 40 to individuals, then made public. It included letters written by Philo Junius, who, some say, was Junius himself.

Several unauthorised editions were published before 1772, and many others afterwards. The 1772 Woodfall edition, however, was believed to have been arranged by Junius, and includes the opening "Dedication to the English Nation" in which Junius expresses his desire to educate the public and thanks them for their support. In the "Preface" he grants ownership and copyright of the letters to Woodfall.

Woodfall was tried in 1770 before Lord Mansfield for printing the Letters; the contention of the Attorney-General, de Grey, was that it constituted seditious libel. The jury returned a verdict of "guilty of printing and publishing only." Woodfall was defended by Serjeant Glynn and Mr. Lee; the Solicitor-General was Thurlow. Mansfield decided in favour of a mistrial, and Woodfall went free. John Almon, a bookseller, and John Miller, a printer of the London Evening Post, were tried at the same time, only for Miller to be found not guilty; Almon was convicted, but seems to have had no punishment. Separate trials were afforded all three.

In the following year the Speaker of the House ordered the apprehension of John Wheble on charges of publishing the debates in Parliament, but the charges were dismissed by John Wilkes in his capacity as alderman/magistrate. Miller was then in turn prosecuted for this offence, but the Lord Mayor of London, Brass Crosby, dismissed the charges, following the lead of Wilkes.

== See also ==
- Identity of Junius
