= Edwin Wilkins Field =

English painter (1804–1871)

- from A Memorial Sketch by Thomas Sadler
- Born: 12 October 1804; Leam, Warwickshire
- Died: 30 July 1871 (aged 66); Goring-on-Thames
- Occupation: Lawyer

Edwin Wilkins Field (12 October 1804 – 30 July 1871) was a British lawyer and painter who committed much of his life to law reform.

== Early life ==
Edwin, a descendant of Oliver Cromwell through his grandmother, was the eldest of thirteen children of William Field and Mary Wilkins, of Leam, near Warwick. He was educated at his father's school, and on 19 March 1821 was articled to the firm of Taylor & Roscoe, solicitors, of King's Bench Walk, Temple. For some years after arriving in London he lived in the family of the junior partner, Robert Roscoe, to the influence of whose artistic tastes he attributed much of the pleasures of his later life. Edgar Taylor (died 1839), the senior partner, was also known as a scholar. At Michaelmas term, 1826, Field was admitted attorney and solicitor. He had thoughts of beginning business in Warwick, but remained in London on the advice of James Booth, joining his fellow-clerk, William Sharpe (1804–1870), brother to Daniel and Samuel and nephew to the poet Samuel Rogers, to form the firm of Sharpe & Field, in Bread Street, Cheapside in 1827. Henry Ellwood was their first clerk. In 1835 Taylor, who was then alone, took Sharpe and Field into partnership with him. The office of the firm was long in Bedford Row, London, afterwards in Lincoln's Inn Fields.

== Jurist and dissenter ==
In 1840 Field came forward as an advocate of chancery reform. His Observations of a Solicitor attracted much attention. In 1841 two of his suggestions were carried out, by the abolition of the Exchequer of pleas as a court of equity, and the appointment of two additional Vice-Chancellors. The energy with which he continued to press his views had much to do with the passing of the Court of Chancery Act 1842 (5 & 6 Vict. c. 103), by which the Six Clerks and Sworn Clerks were abolished, and the path was opened for further improvements in the efficiency and economy of chancery proceedings. In 1844 Field was in communication with the Board of Trade on the subject of a winding-up act for joint-stock companies. The Joint Stock Companies Act 1848 substantially embodied the proposals contained in a draft bill laid before the legal adviser of the Board of Trade on 27 April 1846, by Field and his friend Rigge, who had formerly been in his office.

As early as 1846 Field took up the question of reform in the system of legal remuneration, advocating an ad valorem system, with the option of special contract. He had the support of Lord Langdale, then Master of the Rolls, and pressed the matter on various legal societies, giving evidence on the subject in July 1851 before a committee of the House of Lords. Lord Westbury's bill of 1865, on which Field was consulted, was not passed but the Attorney's and Solicitors' Act 1870 gave effect to his views so far as regards the option of contract. In 1861 he was appointed on a royal commission to report on the Accountant General's department of the Court of Chancery. The Courts of Justice Building Act 1865 (28 & 29 Vict. c. 48) and Courts of Justice Concentration (Site) Act 1865 (28 & 29 Vict. c. 49) were largely promoted by his exertions. He was secretary to the royal commission appointed in that year to prepare a plan for the new Royal Courts of Justice, and declined any remuneration for his services.

As a unitarian dissenter, Field was naturally interested in the decisions in the Hewley Fund and other cases, which invalidated the title of unitarians to any trust property created before 1813, the date of their legal toleration. Field suggested the remedy of an act of parliament, and was the mainspring of the agitation which secured the passing of the Dissenters' Chapels Act 1844, making the legal toleration of unitarian opinion retrospective and, in the case of all dissenting trusts not in favour of specific doctrines, legalising the usage of twenty-five years. His co-religionists raised a sum of £530 in acknowledgment of Field's unpaid services. He applied it towards the rebuilding of his father's meeting-house at Kenilworth. A further memorial of the passing of the act was the building of University Hall, Gordon Square (opened 16 October 1849), towards which Field himself collected much money. In 1847 he was consulted by Robert Hibbert about a trust which he was proposing to create, with the aim of securing a higher culture in the ministry of his denomination. The provisions of the trust deed (executed 19 July) were mainly due to Field's suggestions. He induced Hibbert to modify his original plan in favour of what has become practically an endowment for research, and which produced, since 1878, the annual series of Hibbert Lectures. His third cousin Thomas Field Gibson assisted him with both the Hibbert Trust and University Hall.

== Art ==
From 1857 Field exerted himself in procuring a measure for establishing artistic copyright. He worked hard for the Fine Arts Copyright Act 1862, though it did not do all he desired. In reply to the thanks of the Society of Arts, he wrote that no labour he could ever give would repay his obligations to art and artists.

Field's maxim was, Have one horse, and one hobby. The beginning of his love for art he traced to a Warwickshire artist, William Ryder. Early in his professional life he introduced a drawing class at the Harp Alley school, and taught it once a week. Forced to rusticate at Ventnor by a broken leg, he spent a long vacation in sketching. From this period art was the perpetual joy of his busy life. He taught it to working men, cultivated it in the "conversation society" founded at his residence, Squire's Mount, Hampstead, and pursued it in successive long vacations on the Thames, at Mill House, Cleve, near Goring-on-Thames, Oxfordshire. His original sketches fill many folios. He greatly assisted Henry Crabb Robinson in forming the Flaxman Gallery at University College, London. He was a member of the committee of the fine art section of the 1862 International Exhibition. In 1868 he took a leading part in framing the scheme for the Slade School of Art (opened 1871) in connection with University College. Few things gratified him more than the token of regard presented to him in 1863 by his artist friends of the Old Water-colour Society, in the shape of a portfolio of their original drawings.

== Personality, family, death and memorial ==
Writing in 1888, Gordon observed, "Field's character impressed even casual acquaintances, and accounted for the warmth and range of his friendships. All his ideals were high; and his pace and force were tremendous. His convictions were strong; equally strong was his love of independence in others. ‘Do you believe that heresy is the salt of the earth?’ was a characteristic question of his. A certain bluffness of manner expressed the rapidity of his mind, without veiling his robust goodness of heart."

He was twice married:

- In 1830, to Mary, daughter of Sutton Sharpe and sister of Samuel and Daniel Sharpe. Mary died at Leamington in 1831, soon after the birth of her son Rogers, named after his great-uncle, the poet Samuel Rogers; and
- In 1833, to Letitia Kinder (1801–1890), daughter of Robert Kinder, by whom he had seven children. His sons Basil and Allen followed the legal profession, Walter Field devoted himself to art. His granddaughter Daisy Field married Nathaniel Lloyd who with Daisy built Great Dixter, Northiam, East Sussex, the home of Edwin's great grandson, the celebrated gardener and author Christopher Lloyd.

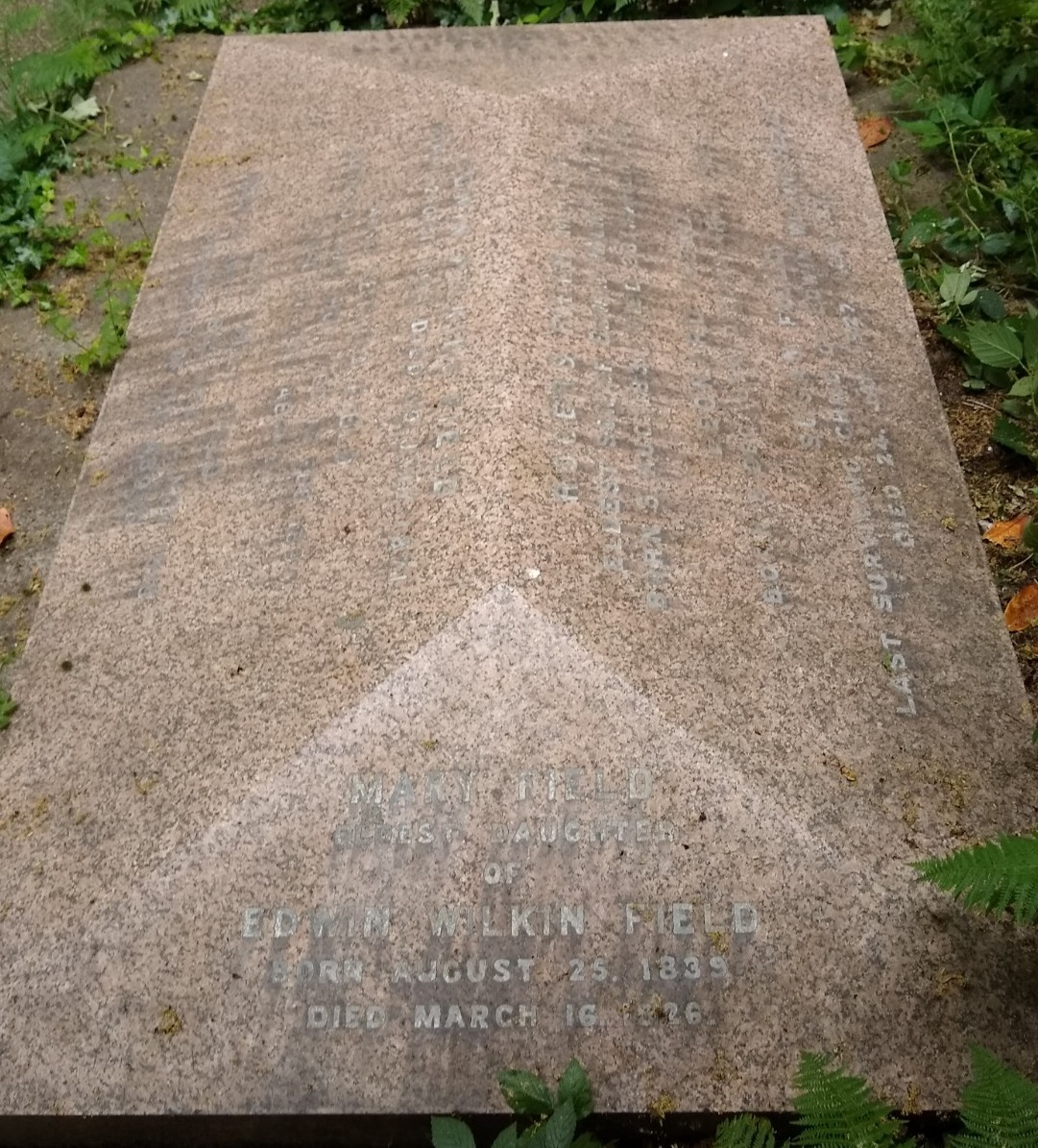
Family vault of Edwin Wilkins Field in Highgate Cemetery

The Fields lived in Squire's Mount, Hampstead, a Grade II* listed building later bequeathed by Edwin's daughters to the National Trust, the western end of which Edwin's nephew, the architect Horace Field, altered to create his own house, Chestnut Lodge.

Edwin Wilkins Field drowned in the River Thames at Cleve on 30 July 1871 when his boat Yankee capsized while in company with Henry Ellwood, his old clerk. Both men were good swimmers, but their strength had been exhausted in supporting another clerk, who could not swim, and was saved.

On 4 August he was buried on the eastern side of Highgate Cemetery, in a family vault next to that of his friend Henry Crabb Robinson and just to the right of the grave of George Eliot. A statue of Field stands in the Royal Courts of Justice.

== Collections ==
University College London Special Collections holds letters to Field from Arthur Hugh Clough which discuss religious issues and accomodation.

== Bibliography ==
- Gordon, A. (1888) "Field, Edwin Wilkins (1804–1871)", in S. Lee Dictionary of National Biography The first edition of this text is available at Wikisource: "Field, Edwin Wilkins" . Dictionary of National Biography. London: Smith, Elder & Co. 1885–1900.
- — rev. C. Pease-Watkin (2004) "Field, Edwin Wilkins (1804–1871)", Oxford Dictionary of National Biography, Oxford University Press (subscription, Wikipedia Library access or UK public library membership required)
- Sadler, T. (1872). Edwin Wilkins Field: A Memorial Sketch. London: MacMillan. ISBN 9780554550930. (Google Books)

Attribution

This article incorporates text from a publication now in the public domain: "Field, Edwin Wilkins". Dictionary of National Biography. London: Smith, Elder & Co. 1885–1900.
