= Joseph Parkes =

English political reformer (1796 – 1865)

Joseph Parkes (22 January 1796 – 11 August 1865) was an English political reformer. Born into Unitarian Whig circles, Parkes developed an association with the Philosophical Radicals. In 1822 he established a Birmingham solicitor's practice specializing in election law. He was an advocate of legal reform, and was active in local efforts for parliamentary reform. Although he initially opposed the formation of the Birmingham Political Union, and remained less radical than Thomas Attwood, the BPU's founder, Parkes worked with it during the period of agitation for the Reform Act – acting in effect as an intermediary between radicals and whigs.

In 1833 Henry Brougham appointed Parkes secretary of the commission on municipal corporations; he combined this work with a successful Westminster practice as a parliamentary solicitor. In 1847, ill health prompted his retirement to work on literary projects.

== Life ==
Born in Warwick on 22 January 1796, he was younger son of John Parkes, manufacturer, and a close friend of Samuel Parr and Basil Montagu, in a circle that included William Field. After Warwick grammar school, he went as his elder brother Josiah Parkes had done to be educated at Greenwich in the school of Charles Burney. He then spent some time at Glasgow University, studying under George Jardine initially.

Parkes was articled to a London solicitor, and became one of the young men who surrounded Jeremy Bentham. When his apprenticeship was finished Parkes returned to Birmingham, and worked as a solicitor from 1822 to 1833. During this time he came into association with American writer, critic, activist, and fellow Benthamite, John Neal, with whom he maintained a correspondence after Neal's return to the United States.

In January 1828 he was secretary to the committee for getting the East Retford seats transferred to Birmingham, and during 1830 spent time opposing a scheme for Birmingham grammar school, which had been introduced in the House of Lords. From the introduction of the Great Reform Bill he took an active part in Birmingham politics, though he did not at first openly join Thomas Attwood and the Birmingham Political Union. He kept up a constant correspondence with George Grote, Francis Place, and other radicals in London.

The government found it convenient, during the agitation which followed the first rejection of the Reform Bill (8 October 1831), to use Parkes as a means of communication with the avowed leaders of the union in Birmingham. He drafted resolutions for the union, and perhaps at the time thought the violent conflict was possible. When Lord Grey's ministry resigned (9 May 1832) he became a member of the Birmingham Political Union, and on 12 May addressed a meeting in the City of London as a delegate of the union. By then, he was making active preparations for an armed rebellion. He was in correspondence with Sir William Napier, who was to have been offered the command at Birmingham; but Napier later ridiculed the idea.

In 1833 the government made Parkes secretary of the commission on municipal corporations, and he moved to 21 Great George Street, Westminster, where he built up a business as a parliamentary solicitor. His house was used as a meeting-place for Whig Members of Parliament. When the Municipal Reform Bill of 1835 was introduced into the House of Lords, Lord Lyndhurst attacked the commission on the grounds of Parkes's former connection with the Birmingham Political Union.

In 1847 Parkes became a taxing-master in chancery, and retired from active political work. He died on 11 August 1865, at home in Wimpole Street, London.

== Works ==
He published in 1828 a History of the Court of Chancery, and collected the materials for a memoir on Sir Philip Francis and the identity of Junius, which was completed by Herman Merivale, and published in 1867. Co-proprietor of the Birmingham Journal from 1832 to 1844, Parkes also wrote anonymous leaders for the Morning Chronicle and The Times.

== Family ==
At the age of twenty-eight Parkes married Elizabeth, eldest daughter of Joseph Priestley the younger (son of Joseph Priestley the theologian). Their daughter Bessie Rayner Parkes married in 1868 Louis Belloc, and was known as a writer on literary and social subjects. Their children Marie Belloc Lowndes and Hilaire Belloc were both also known as writers.
