= Henry Woodfall =

Henry Woodfall may refer to:

- Henry Sampson Woodfall (1739–1805), English printer and journalist
- Henry Dick Woodfall (1796–1869), English businessman
