= Edmund Barker =

Edmund Barker may refer to:

- Edmund Henry Barker (1788–1839), English classical scholar
- Edmund W. Barker (1920–2001), Singaporean politician
