= William Woodfall =

English printer (1745–1803)

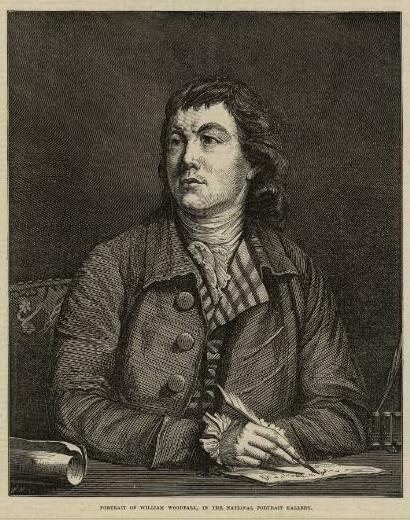
Portrait of Portrait of William Woodfall, in the National Portrait Gallery (4672211).

William Woodfall (baptised 7 February 1745 – 1803) was an English printer, publisher and Parliamentary reporter.

== Life ==
William's father, Henry Woodfall, printed and published the Public Advertiser. William served an apprenticeship with bookseller Richard Baldwin after attending St. Paul's School, London, and Tonbridge School, where his nickname was "Memory Woodfall".

Following his father's retirement, Woodfall shared the running of the Public Advertiser with his brother Henry Sampson Woodfall. William edited the London Packet from 1772 to 1774, then joined the Morning Chronicle as publisher, editor, and reporter.

In 1770 London papers began to report Parliamentary debates fully, against the rules of the House of Commons. Woodfall published long reports of over 17,000 words, often copied by other papers. He would walk down to the House of Commons "with a hard-boiled egg in his pocket, take his seat in the gallery, sit out the longest debate and -- not being allowed to take notes -- return to his printing office and write out fifteen or sixteen small columns of speeches." The Commons tried to have Woodfall and other printers arrested, but City of London officials challenged the right of Commons messengers to make arrests within the City; there were riots, and the Commons backed down, and no longer challenged the reporting of its debates.

In 1789 he sold his interest in the Morning Chronicle and founded The Diary, or Woodfall's Register. Because of the ban on note-taking in the House of Commons, he had memorised what was said, writing it down afterwards. The Diary was published from 30 March 1789 to 31 August 1793. Under the name "Adams", Woodfall acted on the stage in Scotland. His son Thomas, a publisher and printer of theatre bills, married the actress Clementina Collins in 1796.

William Woodfall's reporting was frequently controversial. Edmund Burke sued him for libel and, in 1779, Woodfall was found guilty of printing and publishing a leaflet supporting the acquittal of Admiral Augustus Keppell and sentenced to 12 months in Newgate Prison.

In 1789, he passed control of The Morning Chronicle to James Perry. The Diary closed in 1793.
