= Andrew Kippis =

English nonconformist clergyman and biographer

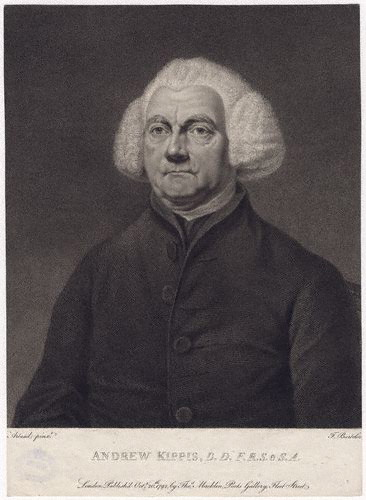
Andrew Kippis, 1792 engraving by Francesco Bartolozzi, after William Artaud

Andrew Kippis (28 March 1725 – 8 October 1795) was an English nonconformist clergyman and biographer.

== Life ==
The son of Robert Kippis, a silk-hosier, he was born at Nottingham. Having gone to Carre's Grammar School in Sleaford, Lincolnshire he passed aged 16 to the Dissenting academy at Northampton, of which Dr Philip Doddridge was then president. In 1746 Kippis became minister of a church at Boston; in 1750 he moved to Dorking, Surrey; and in 1753 he became pastor of a Presbyterian congregation at Westminster, where he remained till his death.

Kippis took a prominent part in the affairs of his church. From 1763 till 1784 he was classical and philological tutor in the Coward Trust's academy at Hoxton, and subsequently in the New College at Hackney. In 1778 he was elected a fellow of the Antiquarian Society, and a fellow of the Royal Society in 1779.

== Works ==
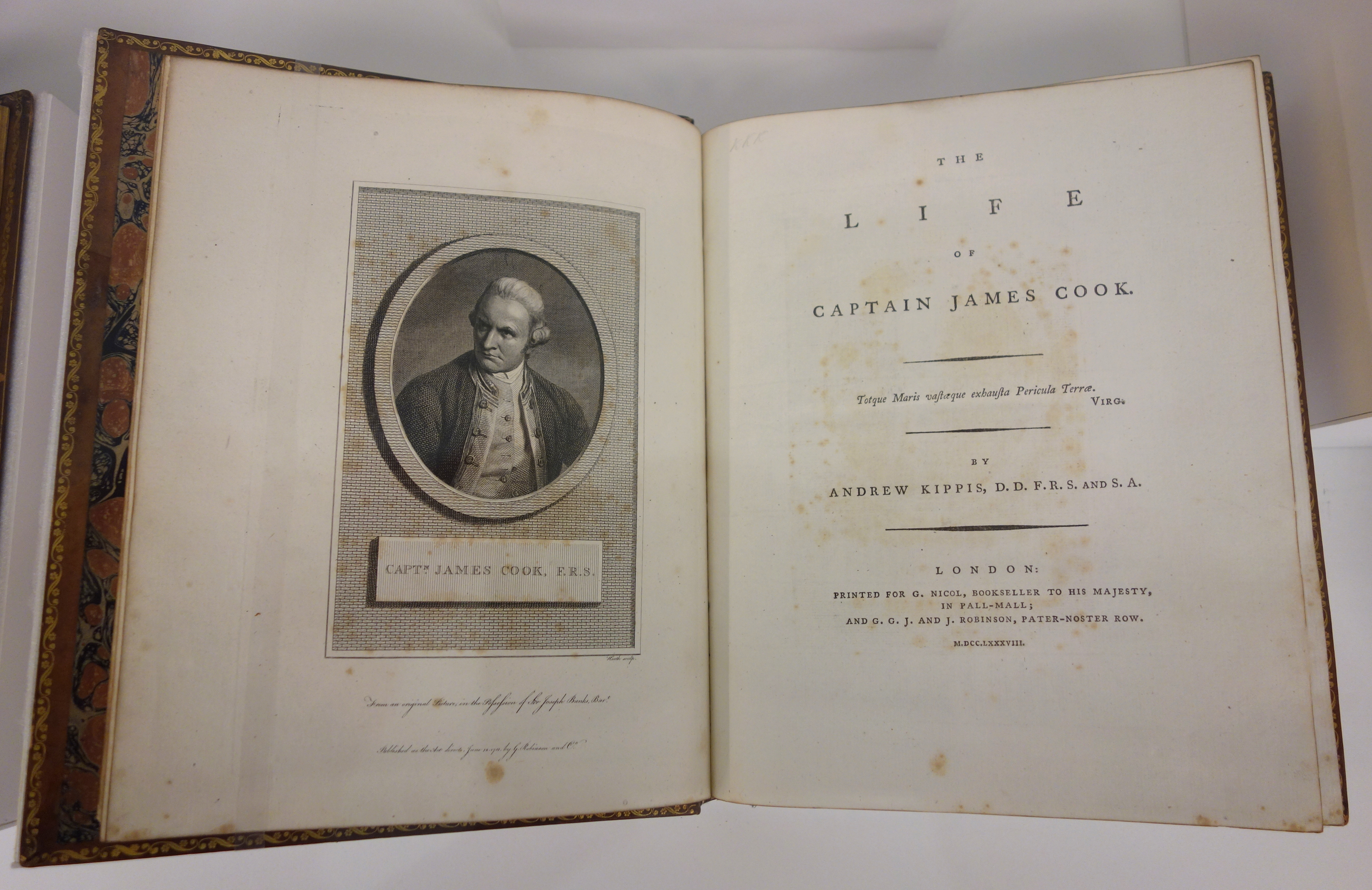
The Life of Captain James Cook, London, 1788

Kippis was a voluminous writer. He contributed largely to The Gentleman's Magazine, The Monthly Review and The Library; and he established the New Annual Register. He published sermons and pamphlets; and he prefixed a life to Nathaniel Lardner's Works (1788). He wrote a life prefixed to Philip Doddridge's Exposition of the New Testament (1792). His major work is his edition of the Biographia Britannica; he only lived to publish five volumes (folio, 1778–1793). In this work he had the assistance of Joseph Towers, minister of Newington Green Unitarian Church.

One of the works by Kippis is Cook's Voyages. This was first published in London in 1788 and includes a letter by Kippis to George III of the United Kingdom dated 13 June 1788. The book has accounts of the three voyages – 1768–1771, 1772–1775, and 1776–1779 – as well as an account of the character of James Cook, the effects of his voyages, and a commentary on his services.

== See also ==
- Josiah Tucker
