= William Field (minister) =

English Unitarian minister (1768–1851)

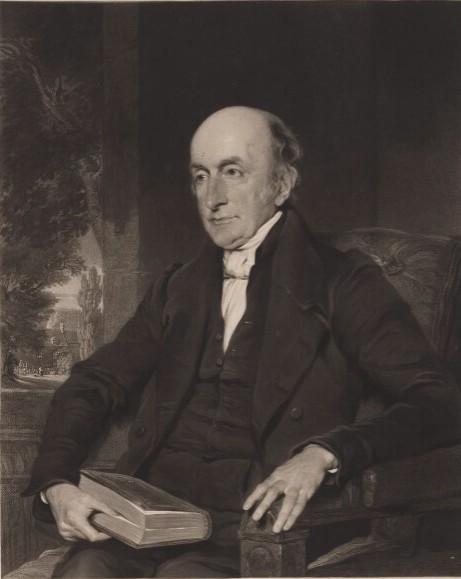
William Field

William Field (6 January 1768 – 16 August 1851) was an English Unitarian minister.

== Early life ==
Field was born at Stoke Newington on 6 January 1768, the son John Field, his father, a London medical practitioner, and founder of the London Annuity Society, and his wife Anne Cromwell, daughter of Thomas Cromwell, a grocer, and sister of Oliver Cromwell (c.1742–1821), the biographer and lawyer; the apothecary Henry Field was his brother.

While at school Field corresponded with his father in Latin. He studied for the ministry first at Homerton College, but left for doctrinal reasons soon after the appointment of John Fell. In 1788 he entered Daventry Academy under Thomas Belsham, and left when Belsham resigned (June 1789).

== Career ==
Field succeeded James Kettle in 1789 as minister of the presbyterian congregation at Warwick, where he was ordained on 12 July 1790. On this occasion Belsham gave the charge, and Joseph Priestley preached. Dr. Samuel Parr, who then first met Priestley, attended the service and the ordination dinner. Thus began Field's close intimacy with Parr, a connection fostered by their common devotion to classical studies.

In 1791 Field started a Sunday school, the first in Warwick. This led him to clash with some of the local clergy. Field then became a pamphleteer. His meeting-house, rebuilt 1780, was fitted with a sloping floor, to improve its quality as an auditorium; Field excited some comment by surmounting the front of the building with a stone cross. He kept a boarding-school for many years at Leam, near Warwick.

About 1830 Field took charge of an old Presbyterian meeting-house at Kenilworth. There he conducted afternoon service in addition to his Warwick duties. This meeting-house was rebuilt (1846) by his son Edwin Wilkins Field. Field remained in active duty for nearly 60 years. He resigned Warwick in 1843, and was succeeded in 1844 by Henry Ashton Meeson, M.D. At Kenilworth he was succeeded in 1850 by John Gordon.

== Death ==
Field died at Leam on 16 August 1851; a marble slab to his memory was placed in High Street Chapel, Warwick.

== Family ==
Field married Mary Wilkins, daughter of William Wilkins "of Bury Field", Gloucestershire, who died at Liverpool on 2 October 1848, aged 64. Her father was a Baptist minister, the Rev. William Wilkins of Buryfield House, Bourton-on-the-Water, who became assistant to Benjamin Beddome in 1777, continuing to 1795 in Bourton. He was later minister in Cirencester, where he was succeeded in 1804 by the Rev. Daniel White. He died in 1812.

William and Mary Field had thirteen children. Of the sons:

- Edwin Wilkins Field (1804-1871), the eldest, married Mary Sharpe, sister of the geologist Daniel and the banker and Egyptologist Samuel and niece of Samuel Rogers the man of letters.
- Algernon Sydney Field (1813-1907) was a solicitor. His elder daughter, Margaret (1847-1936), married James Beale (1840-1912) and they commissioned the architect Philip Webb to design Standen in West Sussex, now owned by the National Trust.
- Alfred Field (1814–1884) was a founder of the hardware company that became Alfred Field & Co. of Sheffield. It was set up in Birmingham with his elder brother Frederick Emans Field (1810–1885). By 1829 Ferdinand was in New York, where he became a good friend and hiking companion of the poet William Cullen Bryant, whom he saw on later visits Bryant made to England. In 1836 the hardware company was founded, and it began to trade from a New York office in 1840, as Field, Parker & Field. Ferdinand was back in England in May 1840. When Bryant was in England in the summer of 1845, he visited the Fields in Warwick and Birmingham. He thought Mary Field "a very remarkable woman".
- Horace Field (1823-1879) was an architect and District Surveyor of Putney. His son, Horace Field, was a successful artistic architect.

== Publications ==
Field's major works were his history of Warwick and his life of Samuel Parr. He published many pamphlets and sermons: they included

- "Letter to the Inhabitants of Warwick," &c., 1791.
- "Letter to the Inhabitants ... of Kenilworth," &c., 1848.

Other publications were:

- A Series of Questions ... as a Guide to the Critical Study of the Four Gospels, &c., 1794; second edition, printed 1805; recommended in the Critical Review (June 1794) to theological students.

Copies were issued from time to time for private use (with various title-pages), but it was not published till 1846, with large introduction

- An Historical and Descriptive Account of ... Warwick and ... Leamington, &c., Warwick, 1815, (anon., "advertisement" signed W. F.; plates).
- Memoirs of the Rev. Samuel Parr, LL.D., 1828, 2 vols.

Field was a frequent contributor of critical and other articles to the Monthly Repository and Christian Reformer.
