= Elias Palairet =

Dutch scholar

Elias Palairet (1713–1765) was a Dutch minister and classical scholar, who spent his later life in England.

== Life ==
Born in Rotterdam, Palairet was from a Huguenot background. After studying at Leyden he took Protestant holy orders, and became successively preacher at Aardenburg (1741), Doornik (1749), and Tournai.

On coming to England Palairet acted as pastor of the French church at Greenwich, and of St. John's Church, Spitalfields, and latterly preacher in the Dutch chapel at St. James's, Westminster. His abilities attracted the notice of Bishop John Egerton, who made him his chaplain.

Palairet died in Marylebone on 2 January 1765; he left all his property to his wife Margaret.

== Works ==
Palairet wrote:

- Histoire du Patriarche Joseph mise en vers héroïques, Leyden, 1738.
- Observationes philologico-criticæ in sacros Novi Fœderis libros, quorum plurima loca ex autoribus potissimum Græcis exponuntur, Leyden, 1752; his explanations were called in question in the Acta eruditorum Lipsiensium for 1757, pp. 451–8, and by Karl Ludwig Bauer in the first volume of Stricturarum Periculum.
- Proeve van een oordeelkundig Woordenboek over de heiligeboeken des Nieuwen Verbonds, Leyden, 1754.
- Specimen exercitationum philologico-criticarum in sacros Novi Fœderis libros, London, 1755 (another edit. 1760); intended as a prospectus of a revised edition of his Observationes.
- Thesaurus Ellipsium Latinarum, sive vocum quæ in sermone Latino suppressæ indicantur, London, 1760 (new edition by Edmund Henry Barker, 1829). In the preface Palairet promised a revised edition of Lambert Bos's Ellipses Græcæ, but he did not complete it.

In 1756 Palairet corrected for William Bowyer the Ajax and Electra of Sophocles, published in 1758. His annotations on the treatises of Xenophon the Ephesian were printed in Petrus Hofman Peerlkamp's edition (Haarlem, 1818).

== Notes ==
Attribution

This article incorporates text from a publication now in the public domain: Lee, Sidney, ed. (1895). "Palairet, Elias". Dictionary of National Biography. Vol. 43. London: Smith, Elder & Co.
