= John Black (journalist) =

British journalist and newspaper editor

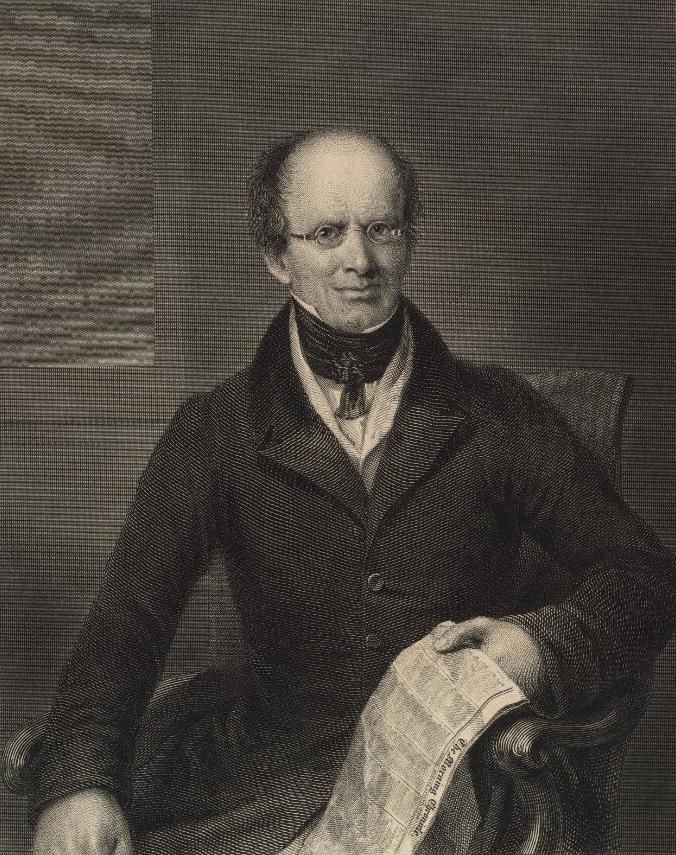
- Born: 7 November 1783; Duns, Berwickshire, Scotland
- Died: 15 June 1855 (aged 71); Birling, Kent, England
- Education: University of Edinburgh
- Occupations: Journalist and editor
- Spouse: Elizabeth Frances 'Fanny' Cropley
- Children: Charles William Mudford Black

John Black (7 November 1783 – 15 June 1855) was a British journalist and newspaper editor.

== Early years ==
Born in Berwickshire, Black's father was Ebenezer Black, a farm worker and former peddler who had married a co-worker on the farm, Janet Gray. Ebenezer Black died four years after they were married, leaving Janet to raise both a son and a daughter by herself. Within a decade, both Black's mother and sister had died as well. He was taken in by his uncle, also a worker on the farm, who sent him to the parish school at Duns before articling him out to a local writer. During this time, Black read extensively from the local subscription library and began a book collection that would become a major preoccupation of his life.

After a brief period as a clerk for the British Linen Bank, Black went to work for an accountant in Edinburgh. In his spare time he attended classes at the University of Edinburgh and he undertook such literary work as translating German for David Brewster Edinburgh Encyclopædia. During this time, he met William Mudford, who became a close friend and important associate. When Mudford moved to London and became editor of Universal Magazine, Black contributed articles on Italian drama and German literature.

In 1809, Black became engaged (probably a Miss Birkett of Carlisle), but he subsequently broke it off, leading to a change in behavior that worried his friends and cost Black his job. Persuaded by Mudford to join him in London, Black traveled there with a letter of introduction to Robert Cromek, who welcomed him into his home. Within three months of his arrival, Black found employment as a reporter and translator for James Perry. In December 1812 he married Elizabeth Frances 'Fanny' Cropley, the mistress of a London friend William Fisher; the union was short and loveless, and she plagued Black financially for years afterward. John Black did have a son Charles William Black 1813-1876 by Fanny, but soon after the marriage failed, he began a long-lasting common-law relationship with Anne Cromek.

== Editor of The Morning Chronicle ==
Black was employed by Perry as a reporter for The Morning Chronicle. In 1817, a worsening illness led Perry to turn over the editorial duties to Black. As editor, Black maintained the paper's opposition to the Tory government of the time, condemning its handling of the Peterloo Massacre in 1819. Yet he came out against Queen Caroline during her trial in 1820, a stance that precipitated a drop in the newspaper's circulation. Black remained as editor after the paper was purchased by William Innell Clement in 1821, though the paper continued to decline especially as it faced growing competition from The Times for whig subscribers.

When Clement sold the paper to Sir John Easthope in 1834, the circulation was down to only 800 copies a day. Yet it soon rose to over 9,000, aided in part by the decision of The Times the following year to shift its political stance to support for Robert Peel's administration, a move that led many subscribers to abandon it in favor of Black's pro-Whig paper. When Peel was succeeded by Lord Melbourne, Black enlisted his pen in the service of the Whig government, writing numerous articles supporting its policies and attacking Peel. Among the reporters he employed during this period was a young Charles Dickens, who later referred to Black as "my first hearty out-and-out appreciator".

== Retirement ==
By 1843, Black's energy was failing him, and Easthope sought to replace him with his son-in-law Andrew Doyle, the Chronicle's foreign editor. Lacking any retirement savings, Black was forced to part with his library of 30,000 books, which he had lovingly and painstakingly accumulated over the years. Its sale, along with the additional efforts of his friends and a contribution by Easthope, provided an annuity of £150. His friend Walter Coulson lent him a cottage in Snodland, where he spent the remaining years of his life gardening and studying the Greek language. Black died at Birling, Kent, in 1855.

Media offices
Preceded by James Perry	Editor of the Morning Chronicle; 1817–1843	Succeeded by Andrew Doyle
