= Josiah Parkes =

British engineer

Josiah Parkes (1793–1871) was an English civil engineer, inventor of a deep drainage system.

== Early life ==
The brother of Joseph Parkes, and third son of John Parkes, a manufacturer, he was born at Warwick on 27 February 1793. He was educated at Charles Burney's school at Greenwich.

At the age of 17 Parkes started to work in his father's mill; in 1820 the factory at Warwick closed, and Parkes moved to Manchester, where he knew William Henry and John Dalton. He worked on inventions for the prevention of smoke, and then took up a new process for refining salt, near Woolwich. On 11 March 1823 he was chosen an associate of the Institution of Civil Engineers, and became a member on 26 December 1837.

In 1825 Parkes removed to Puteaux-sur-Seine and set up in business; he was often visited by Louis-Philippe, then the Duc d'Orléans. He took part in the July Revolution of 1830 in Paris, but lost his business and he returned to England.

== Drainage engineer ==
For Mr. Heathcote of Tiverton, Parkes carried out a plan for draining a part of Chat Moss, Lancashire, which he tried to cultivate by using steam power. The steam cultivation was a failure. Parkes, however, observed the deep cuttings on the bog, and found that deep drains began to run after wet weather, not from the water above, but from rising water. Draining the stagnant moisture from about a metre below the surface had a marked effect on the soil. Parkes's views replaced the convention wisdom of the time, of James Smith of Deanston.

A Birmingham manufacturer on Parkes's suggestion produced in 1844 the first set of drain-cutting implements, and in 1843 John Reade, a self-taught mechanic, invented a cylindrical clay pipe as a cheap conduit for the water. Sir Robert Peel in 1846 helped finance drainage on Parkes's principle. Parkes, though, had less success with practical projects, was touchy, and rejected innovations in his field by John Bailey Denton and others. His last major work was for the War Department: the draining, forming and fixing of sea slopes in the fortifications at Yaverland and Warden Point, Isle of Wight, from 1862 to 1869. Immediately afterwards he retired from business.

== Death ==
Parkes died at Freshwater, Isle of Wight, on 16 August 1871.

== Works ==
Parkes's main contributions to agricultural literature were:

- On the Influence of Water on the Temperature of Soils, and On the Quantity of Rain-water and its Discharge by Drains (Journal Royal Agricultural Society of England, 1845, v. 119–58);
- On Reducing the Permanent Cost of Drainage (JRASE 1845, vi. 125–9); and
- On Draining (JRASE 1846, vii. 249–72).

To the minutes of the Proceedings of the Institution of Civil Engineers he contributed five communications:

- On the Evaporation of Water from Steam Boilers, (1838) for which a Telford Silver Medal was awarded;
- On Steam Boilers and Steam Engines (1839);
- On Steam Engines, principally with reference to their Consumption of Fuel, (1840) for which a Telford Gold Medal was awarded;
- On the Action of Steam in Cornish Single-pumping Engines (1840); and
- On the Percussive or Instantaneous Action of Steam and other Aëriform Fluids (1841).

Parkes was also the author of:

- Lecture on Draining, 1846.
- Work on Draining, with observations upon it by the Duke of Portland, 1847.
- Essay on the Philosophy and Art of Land Drainage, 1848.
- Fallacies on Land-Drainage Exposed.
- A Refutation of a Letter by Lord Wharncliffe to P. Pusey, 1851.
