= Thomas Sadler (Unitarian) =

English Unitarian minister & writer (1822–1891)

Thomas Sadler (1822–1891) was an English Unitarian minister and writer.

== Life ==
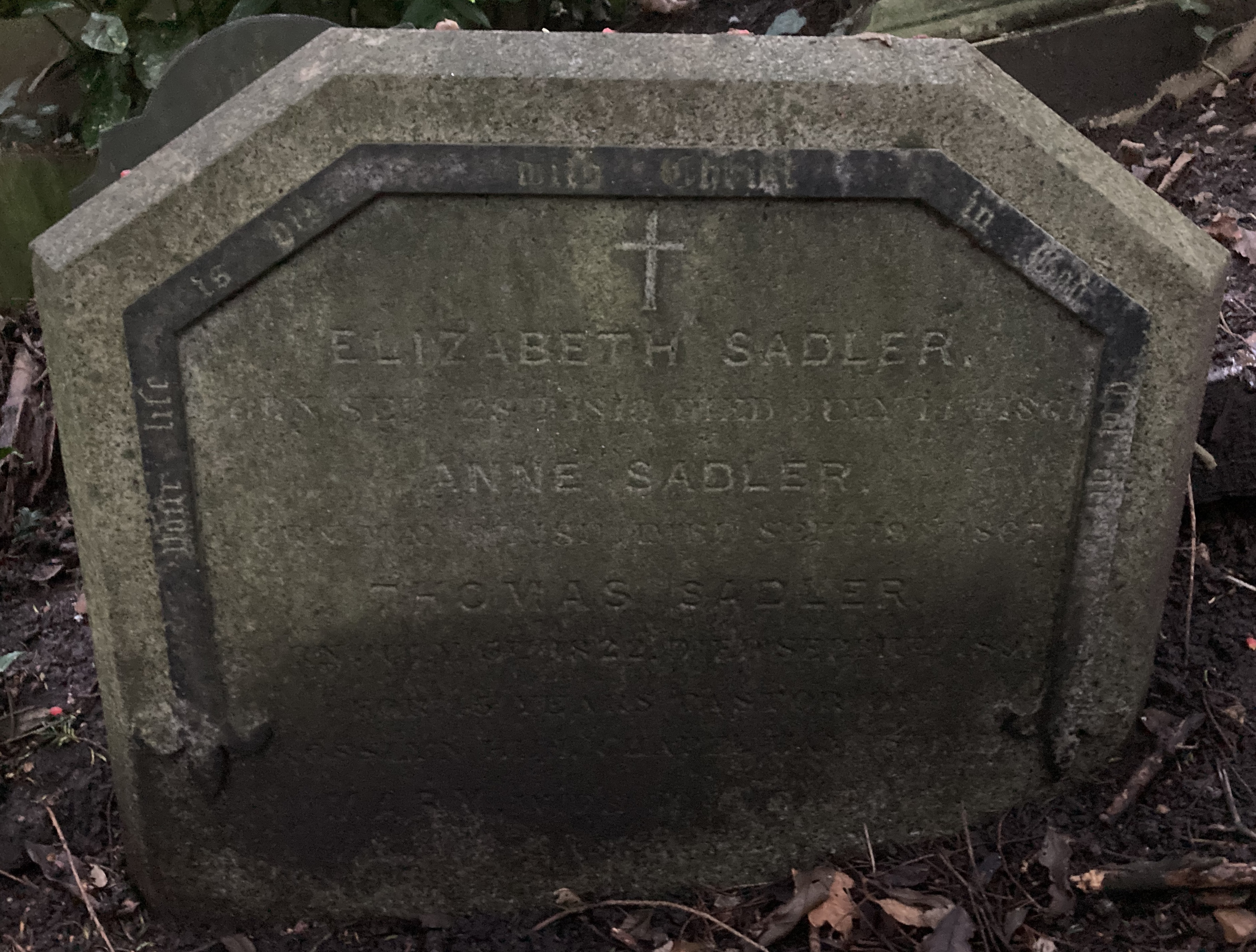
Family grave of Thomas Sadler in Highgate Cemetery

He was the son of Thomas Sadler, unitarian minister of Horsham in Sussex, and was born there on 5 July 1822. He was educated at University College, London, studied for some months in Bonn, and went on to the University of Erlangen, whence he graduated Ph.D. in 1844. He entered the Unitarian ministry at Hackney, but migrated in 1846 to become minister of Rosslyn Hill Chapel in Hampstead, London, where he stayed for the remaining 45 years of his life.

Through Sadler's efforts, a new chapel on Rosslyn Hill was opened on 5 June 1862. He died at Rosslyn Manse on 11 September 1891, and was buried on the 16th on the western side of Highgate Cemetery.

At the time of his death he was the senior trustee of Dr. Williams's Library, and visitor of Manchester New College.

== Works ==
In 1859 Sadler published Gloria Patri: the Scripture Doctrine of the Father, Son, and Holy Spirit, in which he defended the Unitarian position against the views expressed in Rock of Ages by Edward Henry Bickersteth. James Martineau preached the opening discourse of the new Rosslyn Hill Chapel; it was printed, with Sadler's sermon on the closing of the old chapel, and an appendix on the former ministers of Hampstead.

Sadler was specially interested in the history of the older English presbyterianism. His tastes led to a commission, in 1867, to edit Henry Crabb Robinson's Diaries. The work appeared in 1869, and went to a third edition in 1872; but only a small portion of the Crabb Robinson papers were used utilised. With some devotional works, Sadler was also author of Edwin W Field: a memorial sketch, 1872; The Man of Science and Disciple of Christ, a funeral speech for William Benjamin Carpenter, 1885; and Prayers for Christian Worship, 1886.

== Family ==
Sadler married, in 1849, Mary, daughter of Charles Colgate, but left no issue.

== Notes ==
Attribution

This article incorporates text from a publication now in the public domain: Lee, Sidney, ed. (1897). "Sadler, Thomas (1822-1891)". Dictionary of National Biography. Vol. 50. London: Smith, Elder & Co.
