= Richard Duppa =

English writer and draughtsman

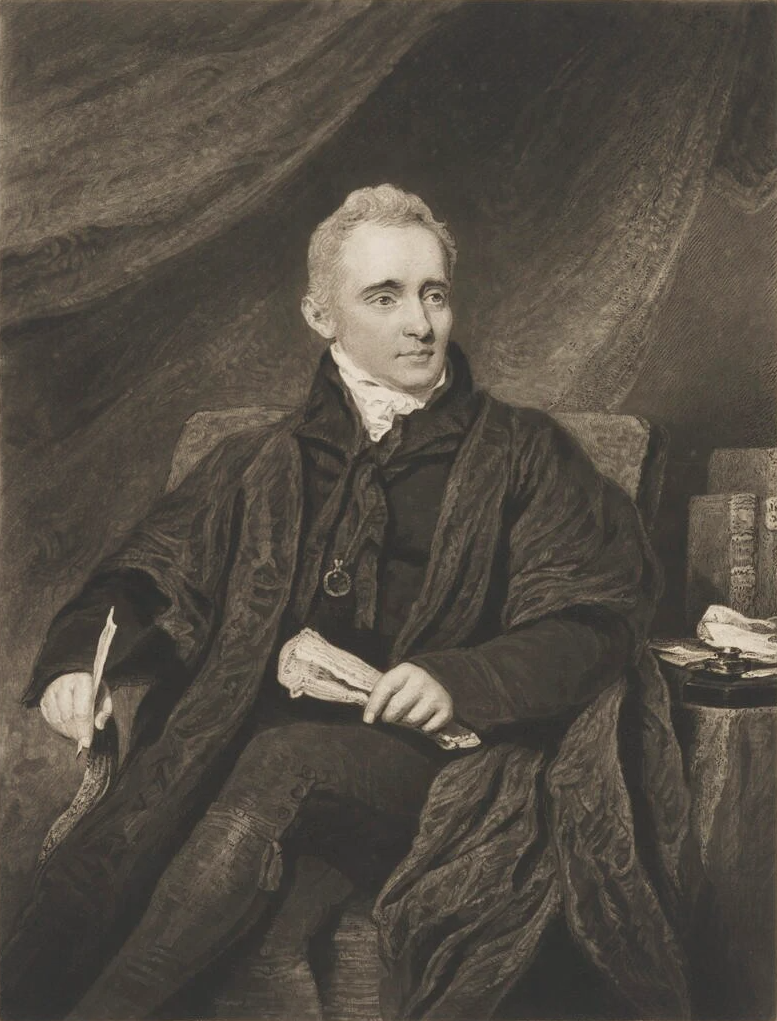
Richard Duppa, engraved by Charles Turner (1819) after a portrait by Henry Edridge

Richard Duppa (1770–1831) was an English writer and a draughtsman.

== Life ==
He was the son of William Duppa of Culmington, Shropshire. He studied art in Rome in his youth, and showed himself a skilful draughtsman. He matriculated at Trinity College, Oxford, on 9 November 1807, aged 37, and became a student of the Middle Temple on 7 February 1810. He graduated LL.B. at Trinity Hall, Cambridge, in 1814.

He wrote on botanical, artistic and political topics and was elected Fellow of the Society of Antiquaries. He died in Lincoln's Inn on 11 July 1831.

== Works ==
Duppa's chief works were:

- A Journal of … the subversion of the Ecclesiastical Government in 1798, London, 1799, 3rd ed. 1807.
- A Selection of twelve heads from the Last Judgment of Michael Angelo, 1801, imperial folio.
- Heads from the Fresco Pictures of Raffaele in the Vatican, 1803, folio.
- Memoirs [1742–57] of a Literary and Political Character, i.e. Richard Glover (1712–1785), whom Duppa seeks to identify with Junius, London, 1803.
- The Life and Literary Works of Michael Angelo Buonarotti, with his Poetry and Letters, London, 1806, with fifty etched plates; 2nd ed. 1807, 3rd ed. 1816 (reissued in Bohn's European Library, 1846, and in Bohn's Illustrated Library, 1869).
- Elements of [Linnæan] Botany, 1809.
- Illustrations of the Lotus of Antiquity, London, 1813, 4to; reissued in folio, 1816, in an edition of twenty-five copies (cf. Pritzel, Thes. Lit. Bot. 2nd ed. p. 95).
- The Classes and Orders of the Linnæan System of Botany. Illustrated by select specimens of foreign and indigenous plants, 1816, octavo.
- Dr. Johnson's Diary of a Journey into North Wales in 1774, first printed and elaborately edited by Duppa in 1816 with Mrs. Piozzi's help (incorporated in John Wilson Croker's Boswell).
- Life of Raffaele,’ 1816.
- Outlines of Michael Angelo's Works, with Plans of St. Peter's, Rome, 1816.
- Miscellaneous Observations on the Continent, 1825; reissued in 1828 as Travels in Italy, Sicily, and the Lipari Islands.
- Maxims and Reflections, 1830.

Duppa also issued pamphlets on literary copyright (1813), on Junius (1814), and on the price of corn (1815), besides many classical schoolbooks. His library was sold on 3–7 September 1831.

== Family ==
A relative of the same name died at Cheney Longville, Shropshire, on 25 February 1831, while high sheriff of Radnorshire. An elder brother, John Wood Duppa (1762–1840), was rector of Puddlestone, Herefordshire.
