= Francesco Cordasco =

Francesco M. Cordasco (November 2, 1920 – October 4, 2001) was an American sociologist and bibliographer who wrote and edited over 100 books. He specialized in immigration history and educational sociology.

== Life ==
Francesco Condasco was born in West New York, living there throughout his life. He was one of three children born to Carmela (née Madorna) and Giovanni Cordasco, a factory worker. The first language in the house was Italian. He served in the US Army from 1941 to 1943 before graduating BA from Columbia University and gaining a masters and PhD from New York University. He went on to teach at Long Island University, the City University of New York, New York University and the University of Puerto Rico.

Although Cordasco's main area of expertise was in immigration to America, bilingualism and education, his initial publications dealt with eighteenth century bibliography. In 1949 Cordasco assembled evidence that the identity of Junius was Colonel Lauchlin Macleane.

In 1963 Cordasco was appointed Professor of Education at Montclair State College, where he would remain for 26 years. As an educational consultant in the late 1960s, he recommended parental involvement in ghetto schools, and worked to encourage community participation in poor areas in Philadelphia. He was also Education Editor at USA Today.

He retired from Montclair in 1989.

He died from heart failure at a hospital in Teaneck, New Jersey.

== Works ==
- 'Colonel Macleane and the Junius Controversy', ELH, Vol. 16, No. 4 (December 1949), pp. 172–83
- The Bohn Libraries. A history and checklist,1951
- A brief history of education; a handbook of information on Greek, Roman, medieval, Renaissance, and modern educational practice,1963
- The social background of the Italo-American school child. A study of the southern Italian family mores and their effect on the school situation in Italy and America, 1967
- Jacob Riis revisited; poverty and the slum in another era, 1968
- Puerto Rican children in mainland schools; a source book for teachers, 1968
- The School in the social order; a sociological introduction to educational understanding, 1970
- (with David N. Alloway) Minorities and the American city: a sociological primer for educators, 1970
- Eighteenth century bibliographies: handlists of critical studies relating to Smollett, Richardson, Sterne, Fielding, Dibdin, 18th century medicine, the 18th century novel, Godwin, Gibbon, Young, and Burke. To which is added John P. Anderson's Bibliography of Smollett, 1970
- Puerto Ricans on the United States mainland; a bibliography of reports, texts, critical studies, and related materials, 1972
- The Puerto Ricans, 1493-1973; a chronology & fact book, 1973
- ( with Eugene Bucchioni) The Puerto Rican experience; a sociological sourcebook, 1973
- The Italians; social backgrounds of an American group, 1974
- The Italian-American experience; an annotated and classified bibliographical guide, with selected publications of the Casa Italiana Educational Bureau, 1974
- A Bibliography of American educational history : an annotated and classified guide, 1975
- (ed.) Studies in Italian American social history : essays in honor of Leonard Covello, 1975
- Bilingual schooling in the United States : a sourcebook for educational personnel, 1976
- (with Thomas M. Pitkin) The Black Hand : a chapter in ethnic crime, 1977
- Sociology of education : a guide to information sources, 1978
- The immigrant woman in North America : an annotated bibliography of selected references, 1985
- Crime in America : historical patterns and contemporary realities : an annotated bibliography, 1985
