= Robert Carey Sumner =

Robert Carey Sumner (1729–1771) was Master of Harrow School in England.

== Life ==
Born on 9 March 1728–9 at Windsor, he was grandson of a Bristol merchant and nephew of John Sumner the headmaster of Eton College. He was educated at Eton College and at King's College, Cambridge, where he was admitted a scholar on 18 December 1747 and a Fellow on 28 December 1750, graduating B.A. in 1752, and proceeding M.A. in 1755.

Sumner became assistant master at Eton in 1751, and then Master at Harrow School. His marriage meant he vacated his fellowship. In 1768 he obtained the degree of D.D., and, dying on 12 September 1771, he was buried in Harrow church. He was the friend of Samuel Johnson and the master of Samuel Parr and Sir William Jones, both of whom in later years remembered him favourably. William Whately called him "the best schoolmaster in England".

== Works ==
Sumner published Concio ad Clerum (London, 1768), which Samuel Parr praised for its Latinity.

== Family ==
On 3 August 1760 Sumner married the sister of William Arden, a scholar of King's College.
