= Philosophical Radicals =

19th century English political radicals

The Philosophical Radicals were a philosophically minded group of English political radicals in the nineteenth century inspired by Jeremy Bentham (1748–1832) and James Mill (1773–1836). Individuals within this group included Francis Place (1771–1854), George Grote (1794–1871), Joseph Parkes (1796–1865), John Arthur Roebuck (1802–1879), Charles Buller (1806–1848), John Stuart Mill (1806–1873), Edward John Trelawny (1792–1881), and William Molesworth (1810–1855).

Several became Radical members of Parliament, and the group as a whole attempted to use the Westminster Review to exert influence on public opinion. They rejected any philosophical or legal naturalism and furthered Jeremy Bentham's utilitarian philosophy. Utilitarianism as a moral philosophy argues that maximizing happiness should be the moral standard by which our actions should be measured. It thereby stands in contrast to the rationalistic ethics of Immanuel Kant as well as to the convictions of idealism, amongst others.

== Background ==
Born in the first half of the eighteenth century, Bentham proved a conduit for Enlightenment ideas to reach nineteenth century Britain. A disciple of Helvetius, who saw all society as based on the wants and desires of the individual, Bentham began with a belief in reform through enlightened despotism, before becoming a philosophical radical and supporter of universal suffrage.

G. M. Trevelyan considered that “Parliamentary, municipal, scholastic, ecclesiastical, economic reform all sprang from the spirit of Bentham’s perpetual enquiry, ‘what is the use of it?’ - his universal shibboleth”.

== Peak activity ==
The philosophical radicals, as a group, came to prominence in the 1820s. When radicalism re-emerged from the defeat of the Six Acts, it was (in Elie Halévy’s words) “the Radicalism – respectable, middle-class, prosaic, and calculating – of Bentham and his followers”. Central to their political aims was the reduction of aristocratic power, privilege and abuse. In his article in the opening number of the Westminster Review, James Mill dissected the aristocratic nature of the British Constitution, the House of Commons largely nominated by some hundred borough-managers, the landlord culture propped up by the Law and the Church. His son veered in many respects from his views, but never ceased (in his own words) to consider “the predominance of the aristocratic classes, the noble and the rich, in the English Constitution, an evil worth any struggle to get rid of”.

Some of their remedies – universal suffrage and the ballot – would a century later have become taken-for-granted realities of British life; others – abolition of the monarchy and the House of Lords, disestablishment of the Church of England – have not yet materialised.

Alongside their political radicalism, the group shared a liberal view of political economy influenced by David Ricardo, and favouring laissez faire; while codification and centralisation also formed component elements (not always compatible with laissez faire) of the Benthamite creed.

== Later developments ==
By the second half of the 19th Century, much of the philosophical radicals’ program had been realised, much had become to be seen as inadequate – aristocratic privilege no longer appearing as the central social problematic. Setting out “to free philosophical radicalism from the reproach of sectarian Benthamism”, J. S. Mill introduced new themes – the dangers of excessive centralisation; of the tyranny of the majority – which laid the broader foundations of British liberalism. And a New Liberalism would succeed to the formative role of the philosophical radicals.

== Criticism ==
- Sir Walter Scott in 1819 wrote that "Radical is a word in very bad odour...a set of blackguards".
- J. C. D. Clark has stressed that the actual term 'Philosophical Radical' was only introduced as late as 1837 by the younger Mill (and for his own specific purposes); and notes as well the diversity, political and theoretical, of those who have come to be identified under its broad umbrella.

== See also ==
- Fabianism
- Encyclopédistes
- Panopticon
- T. H. Green
- Voltaire
- Manchester Liberalism

== Sources ==
- Steven Krees (May 1, 2027). Lecture 20: The French Revolution and the Socialist Tradition: English Democratic Socialists
- The Stanford Encyclopedia of Philosophy – John Stuart Mill
