= Identity of Junius =

Junius was the pseudonym of a writer who contributed a series of political letters critical of the government of George III to the Public Advertiser, from 21 January 1769 to 21 January 1772 as well as several other London newspapers such as the London Evening Post.

Charges were brought against several people, of whom two were convicted and sentenced. The pseudonymous Junius was aware of the advantages of concealment. Two generations after the appearance of the letters, speculation as to the authorship of Junius was rife. Sir Philip Francis is now generally, but not universally, believed to be the author.

== Current scholarly views ==
According to Alan Frearson there is scholarly consensus in favour of Sir Philip Francis; he divides the evidence into four classes, and reports that each class "points most strongly to Francis". This scholarly theory has been called the "Franciscan theory", at least since Abraham Hayward's More About Junius: The Franciscan Theory Unsound (1868). Numerous subsequent publications have been written by those sceptical about the identification with Francis. John Cannon, editor of an edition of the Letters published in 1978, adhered to the Franciscan theory. As Francesco Cordasco puts it, "while the Franciscan theory has recently enjoyed new life, it remains contested and impossible to demonstrate categorically".

In 2026, Harvard professor Danielle Allen argued in her biography of Charles Lennox, 3rd Duke of Richmond that Junius was a secret consortium of political writers, organized by the so-called "radical duke", to criticize the government and the monarch. However, literary historian Joseph Hone questioned Allen's theory, claiming in a review that the book offered no solid evidence to overturn the established attribution of Junius to Francis.

== Early guesses ==
Joseph Parkes, author with Herman Merivale of the Memoirs of Sir Philip Francis (1867), gave a list of more than forty persons who had been supposed to be Junius.

| Candidate | Comments |
|---|---|
| Isaac Barré | John Britton (1848), The Authorship of the Letters of Junius Elucidated: Including a Biographical Memoir of Lieutenant-Colonel Isaac Barré, M. P. |
| Henry Grattan, William Eden, Hugh Boyd (a "cabal") | George Lewis Smyth (1826), "[In London, Grattan] formed intimate acquaintances with Hugh Boyd and Mr. Eden, afterwards Lord Auckland,—facts mentioned ... here, because letters of Junius were at one time attributed to this trio" (The Monuments and Genii of St. Paul's Cathedral and of Westminster Abbey (2:533). See, also, George Godfrey Cunningham (1836) Lives of Eminent and Illustrious Englishmen (pp. 235–237); Charles Wentworth Dilke (1875) The Papers of a Critic (2:30–33 & 2:97); Robert Dunlop (1889) Life of Henry Grattan (pp. 181 & 227). |
| Hugh Macaulay Boyd | George Chalmers (1817), The Author of Junius Ascertained, from a Concatenation of Circumstances amounting to Moral Demonstration. "His claims to a place in the history of English literature rest very much on the assumption—maintained by Almon and by George Chalmers—that he is the veritable 'Junius'." Edward Smith in the Dictionary of National Biography. |
| Edmund Burke | Burke denied authorship consistently, claiming: "I could not if I would, and I would not if I could". In 1770 he taunted the government in parliament for their inability to capture Junius. A Rockingham Whig, he was against the shortened parliaments that Junius had favoured. Later Burke seems to have discovered Junius's true identity but refused to reveal his name. |
| William Burke | Jelinger Cookson Symons (1859), William Burke the Author of Junius: An Essay of His Era. "An attempt has been made to show that he was or may have been the author of 'Junius's Letters'." William Hunt in the Dictionary of National Biography. |
| John Butler | |
| Charles Wolfran Cornwall | |
| John Dunning, 1st Baron Ashburton | "The joint authorship of 'Junius's Letters' has also been attributed to him." G. F. R. Barker, writing in the Dictionary of National Biography. |
| Henry Flood | Author of letters signed "Sindercombe". |
| Dr. Philip Francis | John Taylor at first had been inclined to attribute the letter to Sir Philip's father, Dr Francis, author of translations of Horace and Demosthenes. |
| Sir Philip Francis | Warren Hastings's second in charge as governor-general of India was John Macpherson, who was once an anti-Junius pamphleteer, and may have begun the first rumour of Francis being Junius in defence of Hastings. In 1816 John Taylor was led by a study of Woodfall's edition of 1812 to publish The Identity of Junius with a Distinguished Living Character Established, in which he claimed the letters for Sir Philip Francis. Taylor approached to Sir Philip for leave to publish, and received evasive answers. Charles Chabot was convinced of the identity of Junius and Francis, based on the handwriting and other collateral evidence. The similarity of his handwriting to the disguised hand used by the writer of the letters is close. His family maintained that Sir Philip addressed a copy of verses to a Miss Giles in the handwriting of Junius. The similarity of Junius and Francis in regard to their opinions, their likes and dislikes, their knowledge, and their known movements are also close. John Neal in 1818 criticized Taylor's arguments in Junius Identified, saying he "worked himself into a belief that Sir Philip and Junius were one—and then he proceeded to prove it." Edward Turner Boyd Twistleton employed Chabot to report again on the handwriting, based on manuscripts in the British Museum. He published Chabot's evidence that Francis was the writer as Handwriting of Junius Professionally Investigated (1871). In 1962, a computer-aided analysis by Alvar Ellegård examined the styles and word-usages of the Junius letters. This allowed some statistical conclusions to be drawn about the author—they used "among" thirty-five times, but never used "amongst", for example. Comparing this to the writings of some of the suspects proved informative; Sir Philip Francis used "among" 66 times, and "amongst" only once. A group of general writers of the time, tested as a control, used "among" 512 times and "amongst" 114. Several hundred such words and phrases were found that could be tests of style—"farther" or "further", for example. Ellegård concluded that it was 30,000 times more likely than not that Junius was, in fact, Francis. |
| Edward Gibbon | James Smith, Junius Unveiled (1909), called an "unconvincing attempt" in the Cambridge History of English and American Literature (1907–1921). |
| George Grenville | |
| James Grenville | |
| Richard Grenville-Temple, 1st Earl Temple | Isaac Newhall (1831), Letters on Junius: Addressed to John Pickering, Esq. "The authorship of Junius's 'Letters' has also been ascribed to him", G. F. R. Barker, writing in the Dictionary of National Biography. |
| William Gerard Hamilton | "Though he never spoke in the house after his return from Ireland, yet he contrived to retain his fame as an orator; and so highly were his literary talents rated that many of his contemporaries attributed to him the authorship of the 'Letters of Junius'." G. F. R. Barker, writing in the Dictionary of National Biography. |
| William Cavendish-Bentinck, 3rd Duke of Portland | |
| William Greatrakes | "Greatrakes acquired some posthumous importance from his supposed connection with the authorship of the letters of Junius." Gordon Goodwin in the Dictionary of National Biography. |
| Richard Glover | According to Leslie Stephen writing in the Dictionary of National Biography, Richard Duppa's 1814 An Inquiry Concerning the Author of the Letters of Junius convinced himself but nobody else that Junius was Glover. |
| Henry Grattan | |
| Thomas Hollis (aka James Hollis and John Hollis) | In a footnote to the 1890 edition of Thomas Paine's The Age of Reason, editor Moncure Daniel Conway reports that Paine likely thought Hollis to be Junius; his friend F. Lanthenas, in his French edition of Paine, advertised an English translation of Junius whom he named as 'Thomas Hollis' (scil. the English Deist John Hollis). |
| Sir William Jones | |
| A junto or committee of writers who used a common name | Horace Walpole's idea. Fortunatus Dwarris, Some New Facts and a Suggested New Theory as to the Authorship of Junius, privately printed, 1850. "The opinion of Dwarris was that the letters were written by several persons, of whom Sir Philip Francis was the chief." (William Prideaux Courtney in the Dictionary of National Biography). |
| John Kent | |
| Charles Lee | "Lee was one of the persons credited with the authorship of the 'Letters of Junius'. The idea appears to have originated with a communication by Thomas Rodney to the 'Wilmington Mirror' in 1803, relating a conversation with Lee thirty years previously, in which Lee had declared himself to be the writer of the letters. The communication was copied into the 'St. James's Chronicle' (London, 1803), and the idea was afterwards worked up with much ingenuity by Dr. Thomas Girdlestone [q.v.] in 'Facts tending to prove that General Lee was never absent from this country for any length of time during the years 1767–72, and that he was the author of 'Junius's Letters', London, 1813." Henry Manners Chichester in the Dictionary of National Biography, article on Lee. The DNB article on Girdlestone speaks of Arthur [sic] Lee. |
| Thomas Lyttelton, 2nd Baron Lyttelton | "A volume of 'Letters of the late Thomas, Lord Lyttelton', ... was accepted as genuine, but these letters were afterwards claimed by William Combe as his own composition, and have since been generally so regarded" Quarterly Review, December 1851, art. iv., where they are treated as authentic, and an attempt is made to identify Junius with Lyttelton; and cf. Frost's Life of Thomas, Lord Lyttelton, where the authenticity of the letters is also assumed. |
| Charles Lloyd | "absurdly suspected by Lord North of being the author of the 'Letters of Junius'", according to G. P. Moriarty in the Dictionary of National Biography. Edmund Henry Barker (1828), The Claims of Sir Philip Francis, K. B., to the Authorship of Junius's Letters Disproved, James McMullen Rigg, writing in the Dictionary of National Biography. |
| Jean-Louis de Lolme | A Swiss political philosopher, who moved to England in the late 1760s. In political sympathies, he was close to moderate intellectuals of his time, both Tories and Whigs. He was proposed as Junius by Thomas Busby in 1816. |
| Catharine Macaulay (1733–1791) | |
| Laughlin Macleane (1727?–1778) | Reward is Secondary: The Life of a Political Adventurer and an Inquiry into the Mystery of 'Junius' (1963), James Noel Mackenzie MacLean. |
| William Pitt, 1st Earl of Chatham | |
| Thomas Pownall | Frederick Griffin (1854), Junius Discovered. |
| Lieut.-General Sir Robert Rich, 5th Baronet | "On Rich's sustained opposition to the government F. Ayerst based, in 1853, an absurd endeavour to identify him with the author of the 'Letters of Junius'." William Rees Williams writing in the Dictionary of National Biography. |
| John Roberts | |
| Philip Rosenhagen | William Prideaux Courtney wrote in the Dictionary of National Biography that "It was industriously circulated at one time that Rosenhagen was the author of the 'Letters of Junius', and in the hopes of getting a pension to write no more, he endeavoured to instil this belief in the mind of Lord North." |
| George Germain, 1st Viscount Sackville | John Elwyn, Joseph Bolles Manning, William Allen (1828), Junius Unmasked; or Lord George Sackville Proved to be Junius. At the time of publication, a leading candidate (with Edmund Burke) for Junius; Sir William Draper was confident that the author was one of the two. "The evidence in favour of Sackville's authorship, collected by J. Jaques, will be found among the Woodfall letters in the British Museum (Addit. MS. 27783), but the opinion has never been accepted by writers of authority." Henry Manners Chichester, in the Dictionary of National Biography. |
| Philip Stanhope, 4th Earl of Chesterfield | Proposal of William Cramp, in an 1851 pamphlet of Facsimile Autograph Letters of Junius, Lord Chesterfield, and Mrs. C. Dayrolles, Showing that the Wife of Mr. Solomon Dayrolles Was the Amanuensis Employed in Copying the Letters of Junius for the Printer. |
| John Horne Tooke | A case for John Horne Tooke is based on Tooke's involvement with the Society of the Supporters of the Bill of Rights. This organisation existed during the same years as the appearance of the Letters of Junius. John Brickdale Blakeway, a clergyman who had trained as a barrister, argued for the identification of Horne Tooke as Junius in two pamphlets, An Attempt to Ascertain the Author of the Letters Published Under the Signature of Junius (1813), and A Sequel of the Attempt to Ascertain the Author of the Letters Published Under the Signature of Junius (1815), according to Thompson Cooper, writing on Blakeway in the Dictionary of National Biography. However, Horne Tooke was himself a vigorous correspondent against Junius in 1771, and is said to have succeeded in "largely disarming his masked antagonist". |
| Horace Walpole | |
| Alexander Wedderburn, 1st Earl of Rosslyn | |
| John Wilkes | "During 1769 there was a widespread belief that Junius was Wilkes himself, writing from the King's Bench Prison. This assumption tickled his vanity. 'Would to Heaven that I could have written them' was his reputed reply when accused of being the author. That idea was killed by the publication on 19 December 1769 of Letter XXXV addressed by Junius to the King. ... That letter is replete with scorn for the popular hero ... Junius advised the King that the best way to deal with Wilkes would be a contemptuous pardon" P. D. G. Thomas, John Wilkes: A Friend to Liberty (Oxford University Press, 1996), p. 126. |
| Daniel Wray | James Falconer's The Secret Revealed, 1830. "Wray is one of those who have been identified with Junius. In 1830 James Falconar published an ingenious work entitled 'The Secret Revealed', in which he made out a plausible case for the identification. An examination of his evidence shows, however, that it is untrustworthy (cf. Notes and Queries, 2nd ser. ii. 164, 212)." Edward Irving Carlyle, writing in the Dictionary of National Biography. |

== Other candidates ==
There have been other hypotheses put forward. In most cases the attribution is based on nothing more than a vague guess.

| Candidate | Comments |
|---|---|
| Benjamin Franklin | Franklin was in London at the times that these papers were being published. |
| John Miller | John Miller published the Junius Letters in the London Evening Post. Miller himself was accused of being the Junius of these letters and he was brought to trial in 1770 at the Guild Hall along with John Almon and Woodfall. Miller was found not guilty while the other men were convicted. |
| Thomas Paine | An 1872 book by Joel Moody, Junius Unmasked: or Thomas Paine the Author of the Letters of Junius, and a 1917 book by William Henry Graves, Junius Finally Discovered. Graves' biographical and literary study was supported by the Thomas Paine National Historical Association. |
| James Wilmot | Olivia Serres insisted that her uncle James Wilmot was really her grandfather – and that he was Junius. This was part of her larger claim that he was a sufficiently significant individual to have secretly married into royalty. |
