= The Morning Chronicle =

Newspaper in London, England (1769–1865)

The Morning Chronicle was a newspaper founded in 1769 in London. It was notable for having been the first steady employer of essayist William Hazlitt as a political reporter and the first steady employer of Charles Dickens as a journalist. It was the first newspaper to employ a salaried woman journalist, Eliza Lynn Linton; for publishing the articles by Henry Mayhew that were collected and published in book format in 1851 as London Labour and the London Poor; and for publishing other major writers, such as John Stuart Mill. Samuel Taylor Coleridge wrote sonnets for the newspaper in the 1790s.

The newspaper published under various owners until 1862, when its publication was suspended, with two subsequent attempts at continued publication. From 28 June 1769 to March 1789 it was published under the name The Morning Chronicle, and London Advertiser. From 1789 to its final publication in 1865, it was published under the name The Morning Chronicle.

== Founding ==
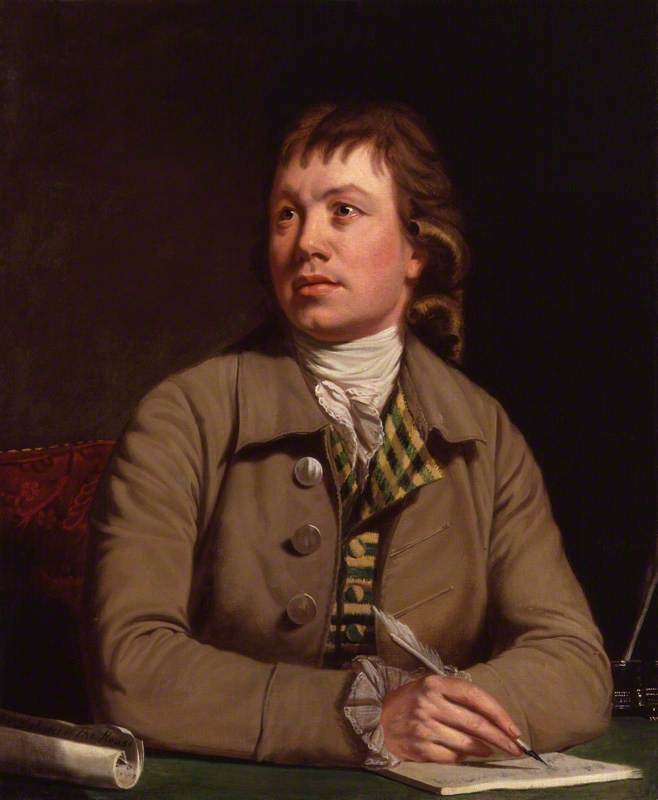
William Woodfall

The Morning Chronicle and London Advertiser was founded in 1769 by William Woodfall as publisher, editor, and reporter. From 1769 to 1789 the editor was William Woodfall. (In 1789 he sold his interest in the Morning Chronicle and in the same year founded The Diary, or Woodfall's Register, which was the first to fully report on proceedings in Parliament as a regular feature. Since note-taking was prohibited, he worked from memory, at least to the extent of writing notes outside the chamber.) Woodfall's journalism slanted toward the Whig party in the House of Commons.

Newspapers of the time were subject to persecution by the government, and in typical fashion Woodfall was convicted of libel and spent a year in Newgate prison in 1779; a similar fate also befell some of his successors.

== Later owners and reporters ==
The Chronicle was bought by James Perry in 1789, bringing the journal firmly down on the Whig side against the Tory-owned London Gazette. Circulation increased, and by 1810, the typical sale was 7,000 copies. Circulation was 6,200 in 1837, and had fallen to 2,800 by 1854. The content often came from journalists labelled as radicals, a dangerous connotation in the aftermath of the French Revolution.

From 1801 the former United Irishman Peter Finnerty combined reporting for the Chronicle on Parliament with active participation in the election campaigns of Sir Francis Burdett (1802 and 1804); Richard Brinsley Sheridan, the Irish playwright and satirist (1807); and the abolitionist and proponent of minimum wages, Samuel Whitbread (1811). As a war correspondent in 1809 he reported on the disasters of the Walcheren Campaign, laying blame at the feet of Lord Castlereagh. 1811 Castlereagh succeeded in having him imprisoned for libel.

In 1809, David Ricardo, then a successful banker and friend of Perry's, anonymously published an article in the Morning Chronicle titled "The Price of Gold". It was Ricardo's first published work, and decried the inflationary consequences of the Bank Restriction Act 1797, advocating for a return to the gold standard. The publication of Ricardo's article started an extensive correspondence in the newspaper, and precipitated the creation of the Bullion Committee.

William Hazlitt joined to report on Parliament in 1813, by which time several charges of libel and seditious libel had been levelled against the newspaper and its contributors at one time or another, Perry being sentenced to three months in gaol in 1798. Woodfall died in 1803.

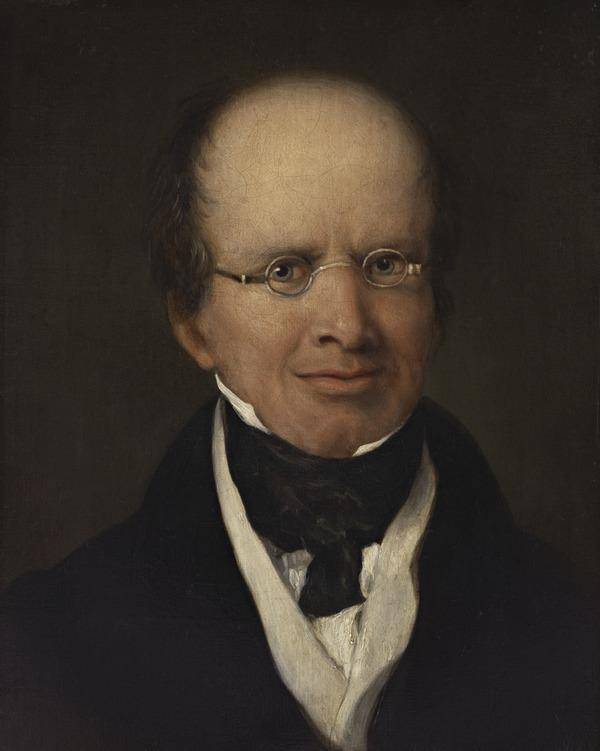
John Black, (1783-1855). Journalist, editor

Perry was succeeded by John Black, probably in 1817 when Perry developed a severe illness. It was Black who later employed Dickens, Mayhew, and John Stuart Mill. William Innel(l) Clement (the owner of several titles) purchased the Morning Chronicle on the death of James Perry in 1821 for £42,000, raising most of the purchase money by bills. The transaction involved him with Messrs. Hurst & Robinson, the publishers, and their bankruptcy in 1825 hit him very hard. After losing annually on the Morning Chronicle, Clement sold it to John Easthope in 1834 for £16,500.

Charles Dickens began reporting for the Chronicle in 1834. It was in this medium that he also began publishing short stories under the pseudonym "Boz".

The articles by Henry Mayhew were published in 1849, accompanied by similar articles about other regions of the country, written by other journalists.

Eliza Lynn Linton joined the newspaper in 1849 and, in doing so, became the UK's first salaried woman journalist on a daily newspaper.

The Morning Chronicle was suspended with the 21 December 1862 issue and resumed with the 9 January 1864 issue. Then it was suspended again with the 10 January 1864 issue and again resumed with the 2 March 1865 issue.

== Editors ==
1769: William Woodfall
1789: James Perry
1817: John Black
1834: Andrew Doyle
1848: John Douglas Cook

== Letters from Sydney, 1829 ==
A series of letters, penned by Edward Gibbon Wakefield, actually in prison at the time for the abduction of a minor but purporting to come from a gentleman settler in Sydney, New South Wales, were published in the Chronicle in 1829. Each was dubbed "A letter from Sydney". These outlined his theory of systematic colonisation, which were embraced with enthusiasm by Robert Gouger, widely promulgated after being published as a book, and later led to the British colonisation of South Australia.

== In Fiction ==
In Jules Verne's Around the World in Eighty Days, The Morning Chronicle is mentioned among the papers reporting on Phileas Fogg's travel around the world. Verne attributes to the Chronicle a position hostile to Fogg and skeptical of his chances to complete his journey in 80 days.
