= William Artaud =

British artist

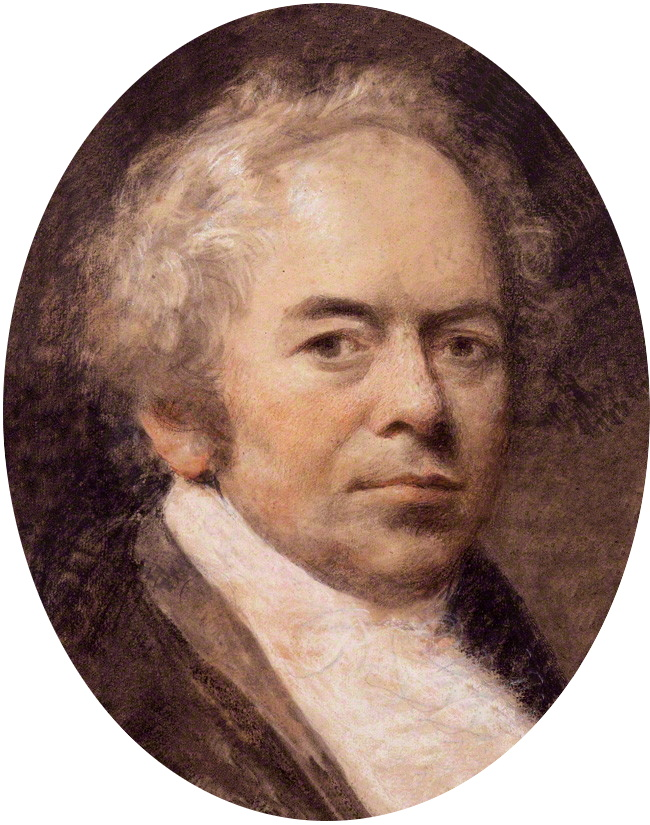
Self-portrait, circa 1822. Now at the National Portrait Gallery.

William Artaud (1763–1823) was an English painter of portraits and biblical subjects.

== Biography ==
Artaud was the son of a London jeweller. He was awarded a premium at the Society of Arts in 1776, and first exhibited at the Royal Academy in 1780. He was a student at the Royal Academy Schools, winning a silver medal in 1783, the gold medal, (for a subject from Paradise Lost) in 1786, and the travelling studentship nine years later.

He painted both portraits and biblical subjects. His sitters included Francesco Bartolozzi, Samuel Parr (now in the collection of the Warwickshire Museum Service) Joseph Priestley, William Herschel and other leading figures of the day. Some of his biblical subjects were engraved for Thomas Macklin's Bible. The art historian Georg Kasper Nagler (1801–1866) gives a list of engravings after Artaud's paintings in his New General Dictionary of Artists.

He last exhibited at the Royal Academy in 1822. The date of his death was 16 February 1823.

Samuel Redgrave said of him "his portraits were cleverly drawn, and painted with great power. They have individuality of character, but want expression."

== Sources ==
- This article incorporates text from a publication now in the public domain: "Artaud, William". Dictionary of National Biography. London: Smith, Elder & Co. 1885–1900.
