= Junius (writer) =

Anonymous British writer

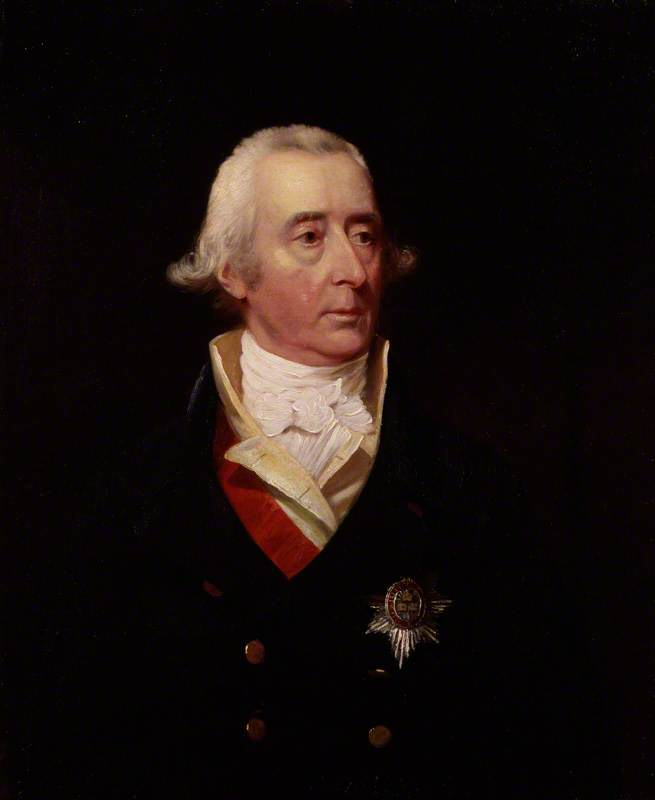
Sir Philip Francis, a possible identity of Junius

Junius was the pseudonym of an anonymous British writer who contributed a series of letters to the Public Advertiser, a London-based political newspaper run by Henry Sampson Woodfall, from 21 January 1769 to 21 January 1772. The signature had been already used, apparently by the same writer, in a letter written on 21 November 1768. These works, along with numerous other personal letters, were included in his Letters of Junius collection that was published in 1772.

== Choice of "Junius" as a pseudonym ==
The name may have been chosen because the same author had already signed Lucius and Brutus, and wished to exhaust the name of Lucius Junius Brutus, the Roman patriot who led the overthrow of the Roman monarchy. Alternatively, the name may have been derived from the Roman poet Juvenal, who was thought also to have had the nomen Junius. Some say that the author of the Junius letters had previously written under numerous other pseudonyms, and that he continued to do so, under different pseudonyms, after the 36-month period (January 1769 – January 1772) in which the Junius letters were published. He may, for example, have written as Philo-Junius, a character who came to the rescue of Junius when it was clear that the public was misinterpreting his messages. There is weak evidence that he also wrote as Veteran, Nemesis and other anonymous correspondents published in the Public Advertiser.

== Objectives, goals and achievements ==
There is a marked distinction between the main Letters of Junius, intended for the erudite public, and his miscellaneous letters. The latter deal with a variety of subjects, some of a purely personal nature, such as the alleged injustice of the Viscount Barrington, the secretary at war, to the officials of his department.

The Letters of Junius had a definite objective:

- to inform the public of their historical and constitutional rights and liberties as Englishmen;
- to highlight where and how the government had infringed upon these rights.

Foremost in his sights was the ministry of Augustus Henry Fitzroy, 3rd Duke of Grafton, a fellow Whig whom Junius viewed as particularly corrupt. Grafton's administration had been formed in October 1768, when William Pitt the Elder was compelled by ill health to retire from office, and was a reconstruction of his cabinet of July 1766. Junius fought for the return to power of Pitt, who had recovered and was not on good terms with his successors.

Amongst the letters' promotion of Whig causes (e.g. sympathy with the American colonists and with John Wilkes) is the recurrent Whig hostility towards Scots and a resentment of perceived Scottish political and Court influence. As with Wilkes's satirically named publication The North Briton, Junius resented the King's identity as a Briton, not an Englishman, claiming "believe me, Sir, you were persuaded to pay a very ill-judged compliment to one part of your subjects at the expense of another" and asserting that the Scots "have no claim to your favour".

Junius' private correspondence has been preserved, written in his usual disguised handwriting. He communicated with Pitt, with George Grenville, with Wilkes (all opponents of the Duke of Grafton), and also with Henry Sampson Woodfall, printer and part owner of the Public Advertiser.

The letters are of interest on three grounds:

- their political significance;
- their style; and
- the mystery which long surrounded their authorship.

The matter of his letters is considered by some to be invective, though close inspection of his writings reveals a principled man ahead of his time, exposing blatant corruption by the only means available (anonymity) in a country struggling with the idea of freedom of speech.

He began with a general attack on the ministry for their personal immorality. An ill-judged defence of John Manners, Marquess of Granby, the popular Commander-in-Chief of the Forces, by Sir William Draper gave Junius an easy victory over a vulnerable opponent with weak arguments. It was in this short tussle that Junius' style and wit first developed a reputation and public audience. Junius then realised the potential he had to influence public opinion.

Confidently, Junius then went on to expose the problems at their cause—the ministries of Grafton, Lord North (Grafton's cousin) and the Duke of Bedford. The core of Junius' arguments were the arbitrary appointments made by Grafton, presumably to stay in favour with the Duke of Bedford and his party (also known as the Bedfordites or Bloomsbury Gang). Most notable was Col. Henry Lawes Luttrell (later 2nd Earl Carhampton), whom Grafton appointed MP for Middlesex (instead of the duly elected Wilkes), and Richard Rigby, whom Grafton made Paymaster of the Forces. Junius ended with an assault on Lord Chief Justice Mansfield, who Junius argued had set dangerous legal precedents regarding press freedom and political libel from the Wilkes affair.

Junius was highly disappointed not to have influenced King George III in his 19 December 1769 letter. He tried to encourage the King to overcome his resentments towards the petty Wilkes and also to relinquish his trust in corrupt officials. Junius was not a radical anti-royal Whig, as many texts suggest, though he did trouble himself with explaining to the public the real constitutional role of the royal prerogative, and (if engaged correctly) how it benefited the country.

Contrary to some opinions, the practical effect of the letters was highly significant—they made Grafton unpopular enough to end his ministry in January 1770. Junius could only have been disappointed by Grafton's replacement, Lord North. Junius confessed himself beaten in his private letter to Woodfall of 19 January 1773 for not having achieved his goals. Despite this, Junius' letters were noticed and talked about for generations afterwards and spread throughout Europe in many languages. His concepts on democratic elections, freedom of the press, legal history and the constitutional rights of individuals are now common-place. Few in history have influenced so many and sparked an interest in such real concepts of liberty.

== Style ==
Latin literature (such as the satires of Juvenal, and the speeches of Cicero against Verres and Catiline) was not only studied but imitated at that time, and supplied the inspiration for numerous writings. If Junius was doing what others did, he did it better than anybody else, a fact which sufficiently explains his rapid popularity. His superiority lay in his style. Here also he was by no means original, and he was uneven. There are passages in his writings which can be best described in the words which Burke applied to another writer: "A mere mixture of vinegar and water, at once vapid and sour". But at his best Junius attains to a high degree of artificial elegance and vigour. He shows the influence of Bolingbroke, of Swift, and above all of Tacitus, who appears to have been his favourite author. The imitation is never slavish. Junius adapts, and does not only repeat. No single sentence will show the quality of a style which produces its effect by persistence and repetition, but a typical passage as follows displays at once the method and the spirit. It is taken from Letter XLIX to the Duke of Grafton, 22 June 1771:

"The profound respect I bear to the gracious prince who governs this country with no less honour to himself than satisfaction to his subjects, and who restores you to your rank under his standard, will save you from a multitude of reproaches. The attention I should have paid to your failings is involuntarily attracted to the hand which rewards them; and though I am not so partial to the royal judgment as to affirm that the favour of a king can remove mountains of infamy, it serves to lessen at least, for undoubtedly it divides, the burden. While I remember how much is due to his sacred character, I cannot, with any decent appearance of propriety, call you the meanest and the basest fellow in the kingdom. I protest, my Lord, I do not think you so. You will have a dangerous rival in that kind of fame to which you have hitherto so happily directed your ambition, as long as there is one man living who thinks you worthy of his confidence, and fit to be trusted with any share in his government.... With any other prince, the shameful desertion of him in the midst of that distress, which you alone had created, in the very crisis of danger, when he fancied he saw the throne already surrounded by men of virtue and abilities, would have outweighed the memory of your former services. But his majesty is full of justice, and understands the doctrine of compensations; he remembers with gratitude how soon you had accommodated your morals to the necessities of his service, how cheerfully you had abandoned the engagements of private friendship, and renounced the most solemn professions to the public. The sacrifice of Lord Chatham was not lost on him. Even the cowardice and perfidy of deserting him may have done you no disservice in his esteem. The instance was painful, but the principle might please."

== Readership ==
The pre-established harmony between Junius and his readers accounts for the rapidity of his success, and for the importance attributed to him by Burke and Johnson. Before 1772 there appeared at least twelve unauthorized republications of his letters, made by speculative printers. In that year he revised the collection titled Junius: Stat nominis umbra, with a dedication to the English people and a preface. Other independent editions followed in quick succession. In 1801 one was published with annotations by Robert Heron. In 1806 another appeared with notes by John Almon. The first new edition of real importance was issued by the Woodfall family in 1812. It contained the correspondence of Junius with Henry Sampson Woodfall, a selection of the miscellaneous letters attributed to Junius, facsimiles of his handwriting, and notes by John Mason Good. Curiosity as to the mystery of the authorship began to replace political and literary interest in the writings. Junius himself had been early aware of the advantage he secured by concealment. "The mystery of Junius increases his importance" is his confession in a letter to Wilkes dated 18 September 1771.

Woodfall felt assured that

when kings and ministers are forgotten, when the force and direction of personal satire is no longer understood, and when measures are only felt in their remotest consequences; this book will, I believe, be found to contain principles worthy to be transmitted to posterity.

== Identity of Junius ==
The identity of Junius is open to question and debate, and may never be finally resolved unless documents are found which establish his identity. Some scholars support the identification of Philip Francis. William Petty, 2nd Earl of Shelburne claimed to know the identity of Junius a fortnight before his death on 7 May 1805, but died without revealing what he thought he knew.

== More recent use of Junius ==
Samuel Saenger, political editor of the Fischer publishing house's journal Neue Rundschau from 1908 to 1934, signed several of his articles as 'Junius'. Most of these were political chronicles that presented a critical left-liberal perspective on German politics. Many of these texts were titled 'Aus Junius' Tagebuch' – 'From Junius' Diary'.

Rosa Luxemburg published the Junius Pamphlet in Switzerland in April 1916, and it was secretly distributed in Germany. The text, also known as The crisis in German Social Democracy, had been started in prison in February 1915. It was adopted as the founding policy statement of the International Group, better known as the Spartacus League, which became one element of the Communist Party of Germany in January 1919.

The pseudonym was used as well by the great Italian economist Luigi Einaudi, who expressed his liberal beliefs in two series of letters signed 'Junius': the former published in 1920, the latter in 1944, while he was living as a refugee in Switzerland.

Irish novelist James Joyce satirised the style of Junius in the 14th episode of his 1922 novel Ulysses, known as "Oxen of the Sun", which takes place in a maternity hospital. The Junius passage is one of 32 parodies of English prose style that make up the episode, in which Joyce charts the development of literary style through history alongside a complex reflection on fecundity and human reproduction.

Robert Goddard's 2005 suspense novel Sight Unseen is set in the present day; however, the identity of Junius is a major theme in the novel.

The Canadian newspaper The Globe and Mail has carried the following legend on its editorial or front page for many years: "The subject who is truly loyal to the Chief Magistrate will neither advise nor submit to arbitrary measures. Junius".

A Boston, Massachusetts, indie-rock band has been performing and recording under the name Junius since around 2003.

In the third season of the HBO series True Detective, Junius is a central figure to the cover-up and mystery. The character had been identified earlier as "Mr. June."

== See also ==
- Letters of Junius
- Identity of Junius
