= John Almon =

English journalist and writer (1737–1805)

John Almon (17 December 1737 – 12 December 1805) was an English journalist and writer on political subjects, notable for his efforts to secure the right to publish reports on the debates in Parliament.

== Life and career ==
He was born in Liverpool, where in early life he was apprenticed to a printer, and he also spent two years at sea. In 1758 he came to London and began his writing career. The Whig opposition, hampered and harassed by the Government to an extent that threatened the total suppression of independent opinion, were in great need of a channel of communication with the public, and they found what they wanted in Almon. He had become personally known to the leaders through various publications of his own which had a great though transient popularity; the more important of these were The Conduct of a late Noble Commander Examined (a reference to Lord George Sackville) (1759); a Review of his late Majesty's Reign (1760); a Review of Mr Pitt's Administration (1761); and a number of letters on political subjects. The review of Pitt's administration passed through four editions, and secured for its author the friendship of Earl Temple, to whom it was dedicated.

Brought thus into the counsels of the Whig party, he was persuaded in 1763 to open a bookseller's shop in Piccadilly, chiefly for the publication and sale of political pamphlets. This involved considerable personal risk, and though he generally received with every pamphlet a sum sufficient to secure him against all contingencies, he deserves the credit of having done much to secure the freedom of the press.

The government strengthened his influence by their repressive measures. In 1765 Attorney General Fletcher Norton moved to have him tried for the publication of the pamphlet entitled Juries and Libels, but the prosecution failed. In 1770 he reprinted a letter of "Junius", for which he was put on trial and by a jury found guilty, although it is unclear what, if anything, was his punishment. Almon himself published an account of the trial, and of course did not let slip the opportunity of reprinting the matter that had been the ground of indictment; but no further proceedings were taken against him.

In 1774 Almon commenced the publication of his Parliamentary Register, a monthly report of the debates in parliament, and he also issued an abstract of the debates from 1742, when Richard Chandler's History and Proceedings of the House of Commons from the Restoration to the Present Time ceased, to 1774. About the same time, having earned a moderate fortune, he retired to Boxmoor in Hertfordshire, though he still continued to write on political subjects.

During the American Revolution, in the year 1776, J. Almon published the "Journal of the Proceedings of the Congress Held at Philadelphia May 10, 1775", which was originally published in Philadelphia in 1775 by order of the Congress. He also published a monthly series of papers entitled The Remembrancer on events in America. A new edition of Thomas Paine's Common Sense was re-printed in London, with much censorship, for "J. Almon" in May 1776.

In 1784 he established a newspaper, the General Advertiser, but it was unsuccessful and he was declared insolvent. To these calamities was added an imprisonment for libel. The claims of his creditors compelled him to leave the country, but after some years in France he was enabled to return to Boxmoor, where he continued a career of undiminished literary activity, publishing among other works an edition of Junius. He published Biographical, Literary, and Political Anecdotes in 1797, and his Correspondence with friend John Wilkes, with a memoir, appeared posthumously.

Almon’s works, most of which appeared anonymously, may have had no great literary merit, but they are of very considerable value to the student of the political history of the period.

== Bibliography ==
- 1762 - A review of the reign of George the Second. In which a new light is thrown on the transactions, and the effects of ministerial influence are traced and laid open
- 1762 - A review of Mr. Pitt's administration
- 1763 - A review of Lord Bute's administration. By the author of the Review of Mr. Pitt's
- 1765 - A letter concerning libels, warrants, the seizure of papers, and sureties for the peace or behaviour; with a view to some late proceedings, and the defence of them by the majority
- 1766 - The history of the late minority. Exhibiting the conduct, principles, and views, of that party, during the years 1762, 1763, 1764, and 1765
- 1767 - The peerage of Scotland a genealogical and historical account of all the peers of that ancient kingdom ...
- 1770 - The trial of John Almon, bookseller, upon an information, filed ex officio, ... for selling Junius's letter to the K----. ... To which is prefixed a copy of the information. ... 1770
- 1770 - A Candid Enquiry Into the Present Ruined State of the French Monarchy. With Remarks on the Late despotick reduction of the interest of the national debt of France
- 1777 - A Collection of interesting, authentic papers relative to the dispute between Great Britain and America, shewing the causes and progress of that misunderstanding from 1764 to 1775
- 1785 - An Asylum for fugitive pieces, in prose and verse, not in any other collection: with several pieces never before published. A new ed., including pieces not in the former edition, and several never before printed

== See also ==
- Letters of Junius
