= Petrus Hofman Peerlkamp =

Dutch classical scholar and critic

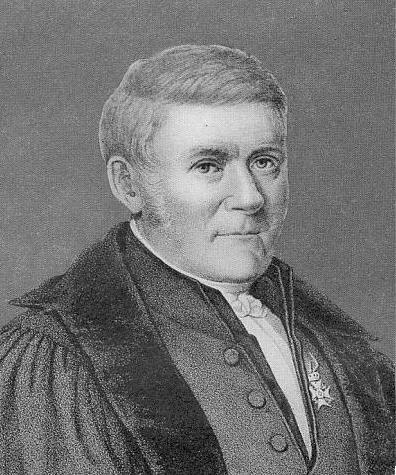
Petrus Hofman Peerlkamp

Petrus Hofman Peerlkamp (February 2, 1786 – March 28, 1865) was a Dutch classical scholar and critic.

== Life ==
He was descended from a family of French refugees named Perlechamp, was born at Groningen.

He was professor of ancient literature and universal history at Leiden from 1822 to 1849, when he resigned his post and retired to Hilversum, where he died on 28 March 1865.

He was the founder of the subjective method of textual criticism, which consisted in rejecting in a classical author whatever failed to come up to the standard of what that author, in the critic's opinion, ought to have written. His ingenuity in this direction, in which he went much further than Bentley, was chiefly exercised on the Odes of Horace (the greater part of which he declared spurious), and the Aeneid of Virgil.

He also edited the Ars poetica and Satires of Horace, the Agricola of Tacitus, the romance of Xenophon of Ephesus, and was the author of a history of the Latin poets of the Netherlands (De vita, doctrina, et facultate Nederlandorum qui carmina latina composuerunt, 1838).

See L Müller, Gesch. der klassischen Philologie in den Niederlandes (1869), and JE Sandys, Hist. of Class. Schol. (1908), ii. 276.
