= Samuel Parr =

English schoolmaster, writer, minister and Doctor of Law

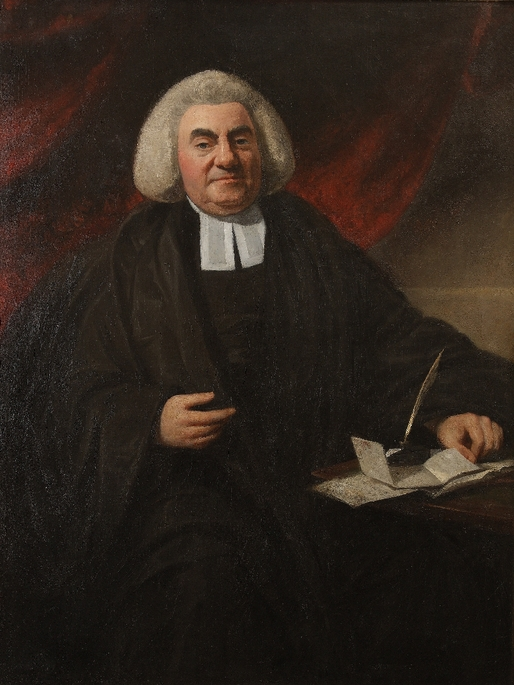
- Portrait by William Artaud, c. 1804
- Born: 26 January 1747; Harrow on the Hill, Middlesex, England
- Died: 6 March 1825 (aged 78); Hatton, Warwickshire, England
- Occupation: Schoolmaster
- Known for: Schoolmaster, Writer

Samuel Parr (26 January 1747 – 6 March 1825), was an English schoolmaster, writer, minister and Doctor of Law. He was known in his time for political writing, and (flatteringly) as "the Whig Johnson", though his reputation has lasted less well than Samuel Johnson's, and the resemblances were at a superficial level; Parr was no prose stylist, even if he was an influential literary figure. A prolific correspondent, he kept up with many of his pupils, and involved himself widely in intellectual and political life.

== Life ==
=== Early life and education ===
Parr was born at Harrow on the Hill to Samuel Parr, a surgeon, and his wife Ann. Samuel was a determined and educated man who taught his only son Latin grammar at the age of four. At Easter 1752 Parr was sent to Harrow School as a free scholar, and when he left in the spring 1761, he began to assist his father in his medical practice. His father tried to direct Samuel towards a medical career. Stubbornly, Parr repeatedly turned down offers to extend his medical knowledge. In early November 1762, Parr's mother died. Less than a year later, his father married again, this time to Margaret Coxe, much to the displeasure of his son, who was sixteen at the time.

Samuel was eventually allowed to swap medicine for divinity. To this end, Parr entered the University of Cambridge, perhaps as a sizar as his stepmother had suggested or perhaps not. In 1765 he was admitted to Emmanuel College, Cambridge, where, as he wrote later, his "tutors were eminently able, and to me uniformly kind". On 23 January 1766, only a few months into his 14-month stay at Cambridge, Parr's father died at the age of 54. Even with financial support from Harrow, money now became a problem, and Parr, unable to continue his studies without going into debt, was forced to leave Cambridge. Because of Cambridge's rules regarding bachelorships in divinity, he could claim one after ten years practising and would not have to be a member of the university to do so.

=== Teaching career ===
Needing both funds and intellectual stimulus, he decided to return to Harrow. From February 1767 to the close of 1771 he served under Robert Carey Sumner (by that time a personal friend) as head assistant at Harrow, where he had Richard Brinsley Sheridan among his pupils and enjoyed an income of about £100 p.a., consisting of £50 salary and about the same amount in fees from private pupils. When the headmaster died in September 1771, Parr immediately applied for the position, but was not selected. Harrow demanded every applicant had a Master of Arts degree; an honorary one was swiftly granted to him from Cambridge, where all of his previous teachers spoke highly of him.

He was ordained deacon by Richard Terrick, Bishop of London, on Christmas Eve 1769, and for a short time he served curacies at the nearby parishes of Willesden and Kingsbury. Parr obtained a licence from the bishop, on 14 October 1771, and he opened a school at Stanmore. Perhaps hastened from need of a female superintendent at the school, he married Jane Marsingale the next month. Despite his taking between 20 and 40 pupils from Harrow with him, the school failed after five years, mainly because it could not compete with the extensive interests of Harrow. During his time there, however, he successfully introduced various curriculum developments, particularly the teaching of English and its grammar (as opposed to purely Latin), on which topic he published his Introduction to English Grammar, which appeared in 1765.

In 1776 he was elected to the post of head master of Colchester Royal Grammar School, and moved his family to the town during the spring of 1777. He repaired the buildings that had fallen into decay and he took a house near it for the reception of private boarders. In recognition of his achievements there, a school house was named after him in 1908. Though his stay at the school was short – he left after only twelve or fourteen months, having quarrelled with the trustees – he made two friendships he would keep for life: that of Thomas Twining, curate of Fordham, and of the Rev. Dr. Nathaniel Forster, rector of All Saints near Colchester. He was also ordained priest on 15 March 1775 by Bishop Lowth, another supporter of the teaching of English in schools. At the request of his friend Dr Forster, he entered upon the cures of the Hythe and the Trinity Church in Colchester.

On 1 August 1778, at a full court of mayoralty, Parr was elected master of the grammar school of Norwich and early in the following year moved to the city to start work. Though money remained a concern of Parr's, he did manage to find happiness at Norwich, surrounded, as he was, by a group of committed academics. Shortly afterwards he became curate to the Reverend William Tapps, serving the churches of St. George's Colgate and St Saviour's. Parr, turning his attention to obtaining a doctorate and with one in divinity not forthcoming, swapped his studies to law. The degree of LL.D. was duly conferred on him by the University of Cambridge in 1781.

=== Retirement ===
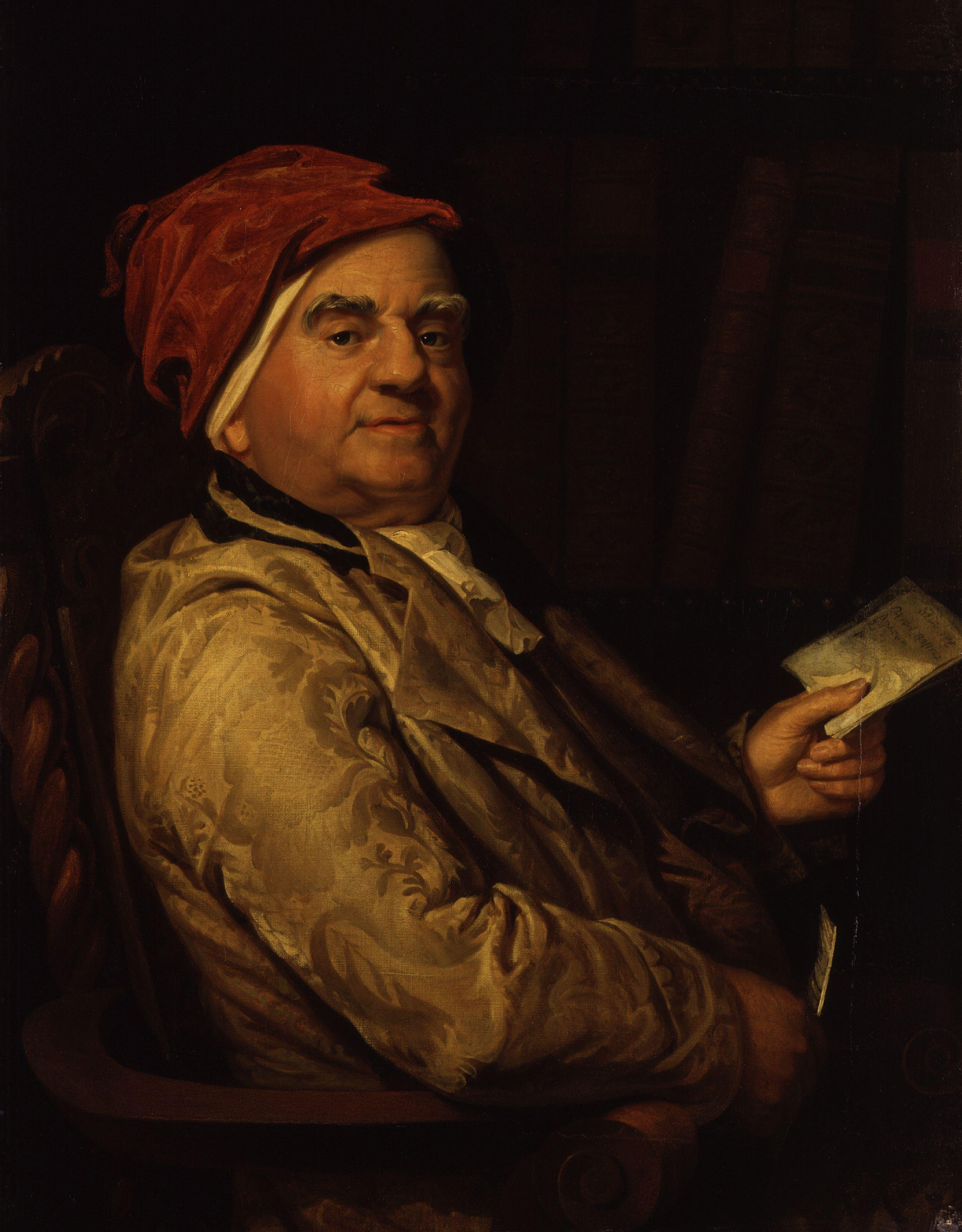
Samuel Parr by George Dawe

Towards the close of 1785, he decided to leave Norwich – principally because his post as headmaster did not pay well but required a great deal of his time. In addition, in 1780, he was presented to the small rectory of Asterby in Lincolnshire, and three years later the vicarage of Hatton near Warwick. The first of these was worth £36 a year; the latter, however, around £100. He duly then resigned the former in favour of his curate at Hatton. These posts gave him both better pay and more free time with which to tutor privately and derive more income from those endeavours.

In late 1788, the installation of the Prince of Wales as regent almost saw Parr become the bishop of Gloucester. William Pitt the Younger had been in power on the authority of George III, but, as the King's health worsened, parliament came close (by a matter of weeks) to instating the Prince of Wales as regent. Prinny, as he was known, was a supporter of Charles James Fox, who was in turn a friend of Parr's; it was likely, therefore, that if the prince had come into power as regent, he would have chosen Fox to be the prime minister; Fox in turn who would have nominated Parr as Bishop of Gloucester. Unfortunately for Parr, the King's health improved, and the Regency Bill never passed. The Whigs did grant him a £300 annuity, however, which he needed at times during his retirement.

In 1789 he exchanged the benefice in Hatton for Wadenhoe, Northamptonshire, stipulating to be allowed to reside, as assistant curate, in the parsonage of Hatton, where he took a limited number of pupils. Here he spent the rest of his days, enjoying his excellent library, described by Henry George Bohn in Bibliotheca Parriana (1827). His friends Richard Porson and Edmund Henry Barker passed many months in his company.

In later years Parr was prone to bad colds and from two he developed erysipelas. The first he eventually recovered from; the second he did not. He bore a long illness with patience and piety, and died at Hatton parsonage on 6 March 1825. His library was auctioned by R. H. Evans in London on 29 May (and two following days) and 31 October (and seven following days); a copy of the sale catalogue for the first part is held at Cambridge University Library (shelfmark Munby.c.132(8)).

== Political and personal views ==
Even amid the terrors of the French Revolution, Parr adhered to Whiggism, and his correspondence included every man of eminence, either literary or political, who adopted the same creed. He was an adamant support of Charles James Fox, and vehemently disliked William Pitt the Younger.

In private life, his model was Johnson. He succeeded in copying Johnson's uncouthness and pompous manner, but had neither his humour nor his real authority. He was famous as a writer of epitaphs and wrote inscriptions for the tombs of Burke, Charles Burney, Johnson, Fox and Gibbon.

Parr challenged the views of the anarchist writer William Godwin in a Spital Sermon delivered at Christ Church Greyfriars in 1800, arguing against Godwin's views that family affections, gratitude and other natural sentiments were inappropriate determinants of moral obligations. Godwin replied at length to Parr, noting critically that:

It may appear at first sight a little surprising that all there is of gall, intolerance and contempt in Dr. Parr’s publication, is contained in that part of it which was delivered by him from the pulpit in the character of a Christian preacher, and that whatever is gentlemanlike, liberal or candid is thrown back into the Notes.

Parr wrote of his views in his memoirs:

My principles, I am sure, will never endanger the church [of England] – my studies, I hope, are such as do not disgrace it – and my actions, I can say with confidence, have ever tended to preserve it from open, and what I conceive to be unjust attacks.

== Writings ==
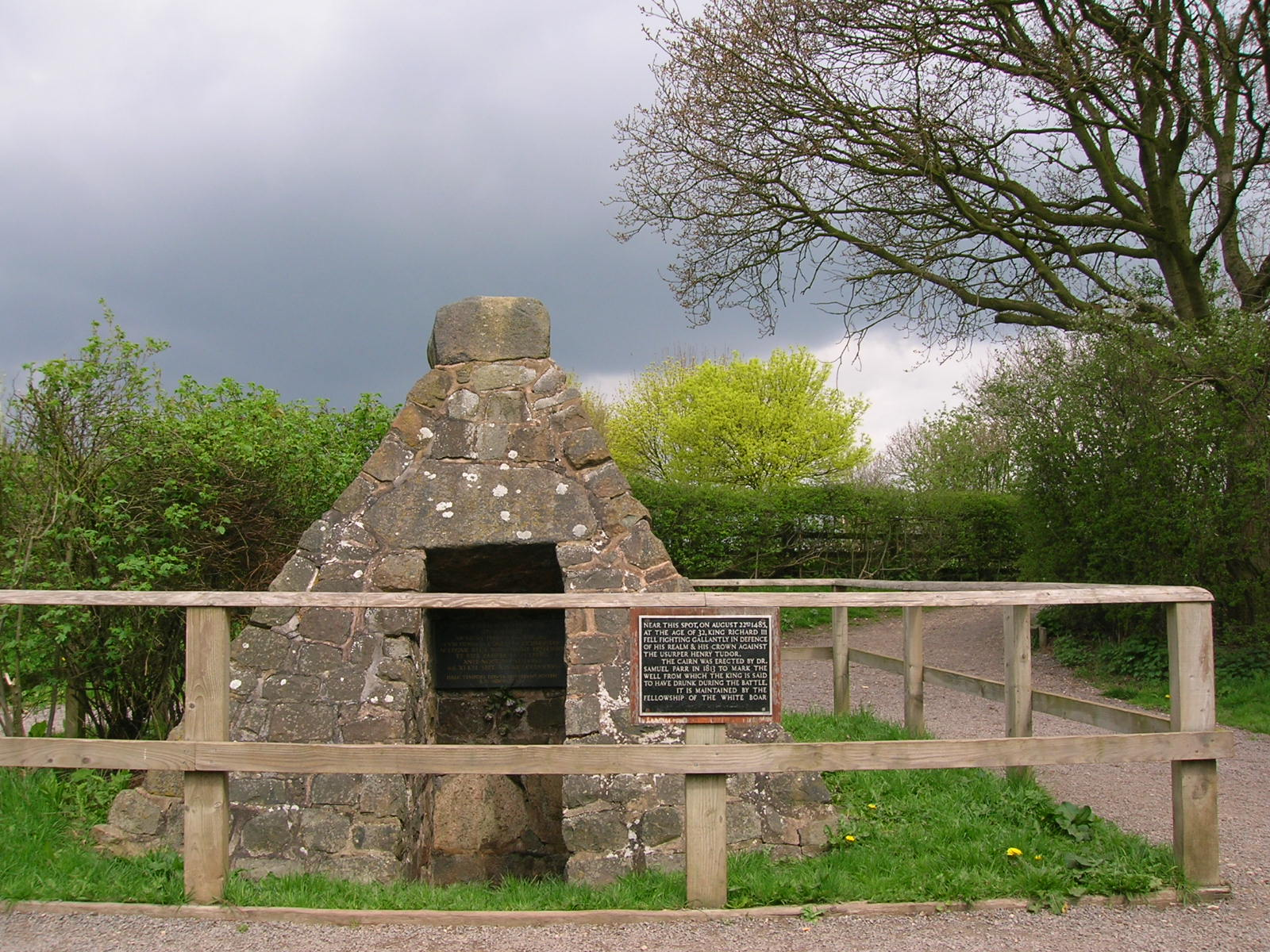
King Richard's Well, Bosworth Field

Parr's writings fill several volumes, but all may be seen as beneath the reputation which he acquired through the variety of his knowledge and dogmatism of his conversation. The chief of them are his Characters of Charles James Fox (1809) and his edited reprint of Tracts of Warburton and a Warburtonian, which caused controversy; in his critique of Warburton, he focused on the worst written by William Warburton and Richard Hurd, which probably did not deserve to be reprinted, even if they were deliberately being suppressed by their authors. His Latin preface to The Three Treatises of Bellendenus should also not be forgotten, regarded, as it was, as a great work of modern Latin.

John Johnstone lists approximately 1500 of Parr's correspondents, including two members of the royal family, four archbishops and a vast selection of dukes, marquesses, earls, viscounts, lords, knights, judges and members of parliament.

In Parr 1813 he wrote the Latin inscription on King Richard's Well at the presumed site of the Battle of Bosworth, Shenton.

== Memoirs ==
There are two memoirs of his life, one by William Field (1828), the other, with his works and his letters, by John Johnstone (1828); and Edmund Henry Barker published in 1828–1829 two volumes of Parriana, a confused mass of information on Parr and his friends. An essay on his life, Dr. Samuel Parr: or, Whiggism in its relations to literature, is included in Thomas de Quincey's works, vol. v., and a little volume of the Aphorisms, Opinions and Reflections of the late Dr Parr appeared in 1826.
