= James Perry (journalist) =

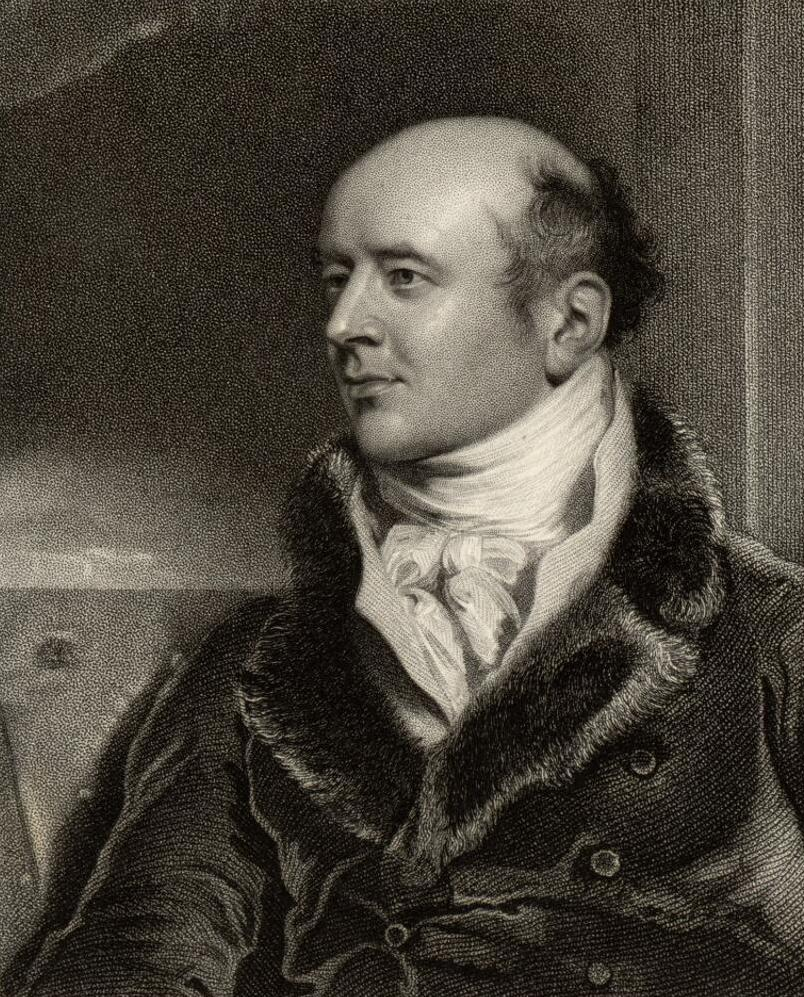
- Born: James Pirie; 30 October 1756; Aberdeen, Scotland
- Died: 4 December 1821 (aged 65); Brighton, England
- Education: Marischal College, Aberdeen
- Occupations: Journalist and editor
- Spouse: Anne Hull
- Children: Thomas Erskine Perry

James Perry, born James Pirie (30 October 1756 – 4 December 1821) was a British journalist and newspaper editor.

== Biography ==
Admitted to Marischal College, Aberdeen, in 1771, he began studying for the Scottish bar. Forced to abandon his studies after his father's building business failed in 1774, he moved to London in 1777. He became a reporter for The General Advertiser and the London Evening Post, where he raised sales in 1779 by his court reporting from the Portsmouth trial of Admiral Keppel and Admiral Palliser. He established The European Magazine in 1782, leaving it a year later to edit The Gazeteer as "the Paper of the People". In 1790 he managed to become owner and editor of the Morning Chronicle. In 1791–92 he reported from Paris on the progress of the French Revolution. His political influence was sufficient for Pitt and Lord Shelburne to offer him a parliamentary seat, though he refused.

Perry's Foxite journalism occasionally led to government prosecution. On two occasions he was acquitted: for printing an advertisement for a Derby meeting of the Society for Constitutional Information in 1792, and for copying a paragraph from Leigh Hunt's Examiner about the Prince of Wales in 1810. However, he was sentenced to three months' imprisonment in Newgate for allegedly libelling the house in 1798.

In August 1798 he married Anne Hull: their eight children included the Indian judge and politician Thomas Erskine Perry (1806–1882). Their daughter, Horatia Ann, married John Crawfurd, and accompanied him on his Mission to Siam and Cochin China from 1821 to 1822. Two of his daughters, Jane and Kate, were good friends with William Makepeace Thackeray and were present at a party hosted by Thackeray to meet Charlotte Brontë on 12 June 1850.
