= Henry Dick Woodfall =

English businessman

Henry Dick Woodfall (1796 – April 13, 1869) was an English businessman. Together with John Rice Crowe, he founded Alten Copper Works in Kåfjord, Norway, later renamed the Kåfjord Copper Works.

Henry Woodfall was born in Scotland in 1796, the son of the printer George Woodfall, whose business he inherited. After relocating to Norway, he had a relationship with a local woman, Ane Helene Johannesdotter Muotka, and their son Salamon Woodfall was born in 1831. As director of Alten Copper Works, Woodfall was skeptical of bringing labor from England because he believed that the work was better served by building up a permanent mining community with Norwegian workers. He was also concerned that the mining company should take care of the miners and their families, and together with Crowe he founded Kåfjord as a society with a number of welfare services for the growing local population. Woodfall died in Nice, France in 1869.

The various mines in Kåfjord were named after the stakeholders in the copper works, and one of the mines was called the Woodfall Mine.

John Rice Crowe named one of his sons, Henry Woodfall Crowe, after his business partner.
