= Daniel Sharpe =

Daniel Sharpe FRS (6 April 1806 – 31 May 1856) was an English geologist. He was born at Nottingham Place, Marylebone, Middlesex. He studied a number of mountainous formations in Great Britain and Continental Europe and arrived at important conclusions about cleavage in rocks.

== Life ==
Orphaned before his first birthday, he was looked after by a half-sister. His mother's family owned a bank in the City of London, and his uncle was Samuel Rogers, the poet and literary figure, so Daniel was not abandoned. At the age of 16 he entered the counting house of a Portuguese merchant in London. At the age of 25, after spending a year in Portugal, he joined his elder brother as a partner in a Portuguese mercantile business.

As a geologist he first became known by his researches (1832–1840) on the geological structure of the neighbourhood of Lisbon. He studied the Silurian rocks of the Lake District and North Wales (1842–1844), and afterwards investigated the structure of the Alps (1854–1855). He was elected to the Royal Society in 1850.

He published several essays on cleavage (1847–1852), and showed from the evidence of distortion of organic remains that the direction of the pressure producing contortions in the rocks was perpendicular to the planes of cleavage.

Most of his papers were published in the Quarterly Journal of the Geological Society, but one "On the Arrangement of the Foliation and Cleavage of the Rocks of the North of Scotland," was printed in the Philosophical Transactions of the Royal Society in 1852. He was author also of a Monograph on the Cephalopoda of the Chalk, published by the Palaeontographical Society (1853–1857). In 1856 he was elected president of the Geological Society of London, but he died in London, from the effects of a riding accident, on 31 May that year.
