= Henry Sampson Woodfall =

English journalist

Henry Sampson Woodfall (21 June 1739 – 12 December 1805) was an English printer and journalist. He was born and lived in London.

== Biography ==
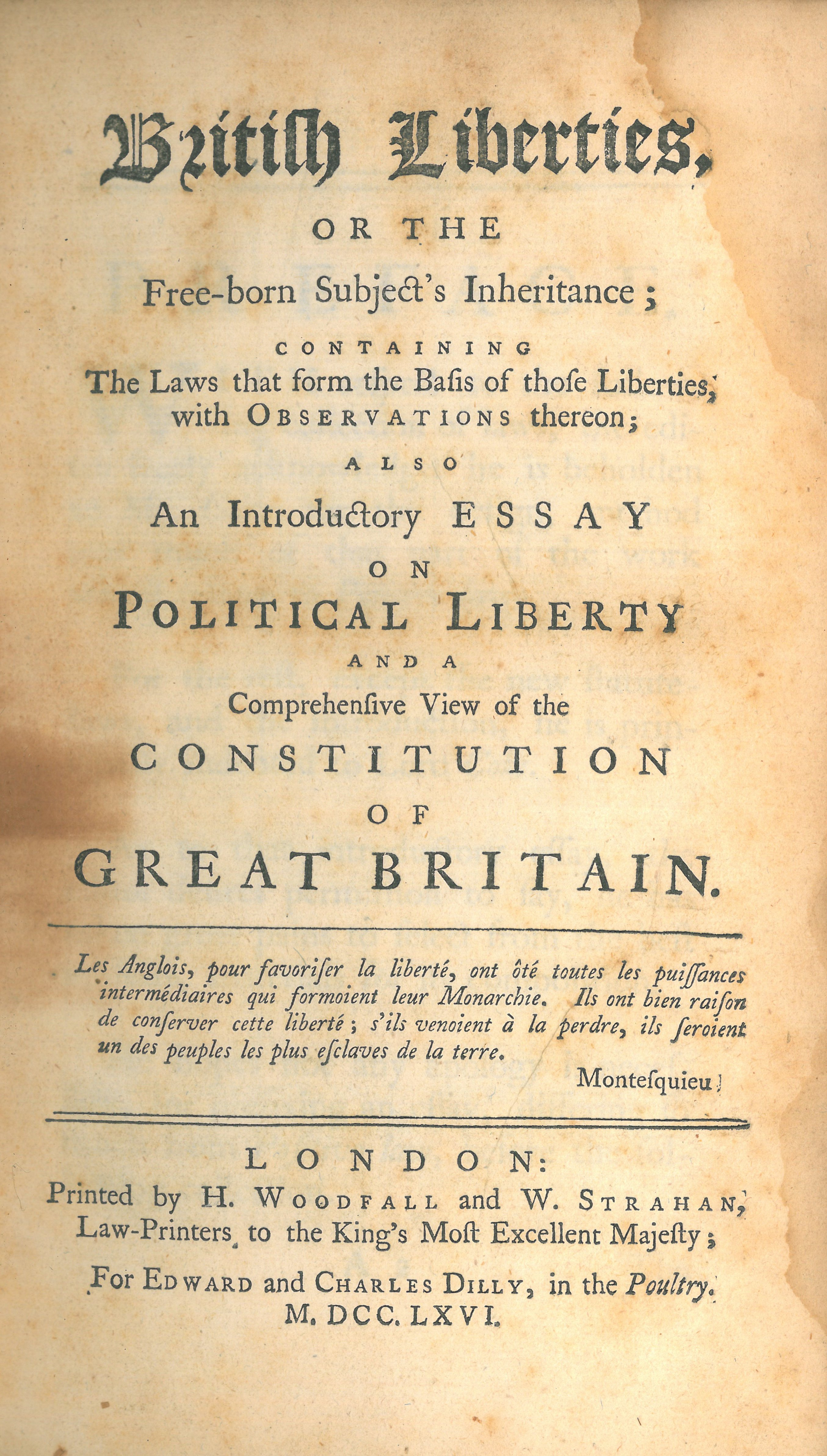
British Liberties, or the Free-born Subject's Inheritance, an anonymous 1766 book published by Woodfall and William Strahan, "Law-Printers to the King's Most Excellent Majesty"

Woodfall's grandfather Henry Woodfall (c. 1686–1747), was the author of the ballad Darby and Joan, for which John Darby and his wife were the originals: the elder Woodfall had been apprenticed in 1701 to Darby, a printer in Bartholomew Close in the Little Britain area of London, who died in 1730.

Woodfall's grandfather printed many of the works of Alexander Pope. Woodfall's uncle George was a bookseller in Charing Cross. His father, Henry Woodfall (1713–1769), was the printer of the newspaper the Public Advertiser, and Woodfall was apprenticed to his father. At the age of nineteen, Woodfall took over the control of the newspaper.

In it appeared, between 21 January 1769 and 21 January 1772, the famous letters of Junius. In December 1769 Woodfall published a "Letter to the King" by Junius that brought legal charges against Woodfall and five others for seditious libel; Woodfall's case went before a jury in June 1770 but a verdict of mistrial was handed down by Lord Mansfield in November 1770. Woodfall sold his interest in the Public Advertiser in 1793.

His son George Woodfall (1767–1844) was also in the family printing business. Woodfall's younger brother, William Woodfall (1746–1803), a journalist, established in 1789 a daily paper called the Diary, or Woodfall's Register, in which, for the first time, reports of parliamentary debates were published on the morning after they had taken place. William Woodfall's nickname was "Memory" Woodfall based on his ability to memorize Parliamentary speeches at a time when journalists were not allowed to take notes or write down speeches while they were being delivered.
