= Public Advertiser =

The Public Advertiser was a London newspaper in the 18th century.

The Public Advertiser was originally known as the London Daily Post and General Advertiser, then simply the General Advertiser consisting more or less exclusively of adverts. It was taken over by its printer, Henry Woodfall (1713–1769), and relaunched as the Public Advertiser with much more news content. In 1758, the printer's nineteen-year-old son, Henry Sampson Woodfall took it over. H. S. Woodfall sold his interest in the Public Advertiser in November 1793. A successor Public Advertiser, or Political and Literary Diary was printed for some months by N. Byrne but was out of business by 1795.

The anonymous polemicist Junius sent his public letters to the Public Advertiser.

Benjamin Franklin published eleven essays attacking the controversial Townsend Acts in the Public Advertiser early in 1770. The letters can be viewed in volume seventeen of The Papers of Benjamin Franklin.
