= Banak =

Banak may refer to:

== People ==
- Łukasz Banak (born 1983), an amateur Polish Greco-Roman wrestler

== Places ==
=== China ===
- Banak Shöl Hotel, a historical hotel in Lhasa, Tibet

=== Iran ===
- Banak, alternate name of the city of Bank, Iran
- Banak, Fars, a village in Fars Province, Iran
- Banak, Kerman, a village in Kerman Province, Iran

=== Norway ===
- Banak, Norway, a peninsula in Porsanger, Finnmark county, Norway
- Lakselv Airport, Banak, an airport in Finnmark county, Norway
- Station Group Banak, a military airbase in Finnmark county, Norway

=== Turkey ===
- Banak Cathedral, a medieval Armeno-Georgian cathedral in Penek, Turkey

== Other uses ==
- Banak, a common name for the lobed river mullet from the Philippines
