= Bazgir =

Bazgir or Baz Gir (Persian: بازگير) may refer to:

Afghanistan

- Bazgir, Badakhshan, Afghanistan
- Bazgir, Helmand, Afghanistan
- Bazgir, Orūzgān, Afghanistan

Iran

- Baz Gir, Golestan, Iran
- Bazgir, Hormozgan, Iran
- Bazgir, Kerman, Iran
- Bazgir, Kermanshah, Iran
- Bazgir, Lorestan, Iran
