= Dargaz (disambiguation) =

Dargaz, also known as Darreh Gaz, is a city in Razavi Khorasan Province, Iran.

Dargaz (Persian: درگز) or Darreh Gaz may also refer to:

- Dargaz, Bandar Abbas, Hormozgan Province
- Dargaz, Bashagard, Hormozgan Province
- Dargaz, Hajjiabad, Hormozgan Province
- Dargaz Kulak, Kerman Province
- Dargaz, Sistan and Baluchestan
- Dargaz, Chabahar, Sistan and Baluchestan Province
- Dargaz County, in Razavi Khorasan Province
