= Taleqan, Kerman =

Taleqan طالقان
- Village
- Location within Iran
- Coordinates: 27°27′00″N 57°33′18″E
- Country: Iran
- Province: Kerman
- County: Manujan
- Bakhsh: Central
- Rural District: Qaleh

Population (2006)
  - Total: 849
- Time zone: UTC+3:30 (IRST)
  - Summer (DST): UTC+4:30 (IRDT)

Taleqan (Persian: طالقان, also Romanized as Ţāleqān) is a village in Qaleh Rural District, in the Central District of Manujan County, Kerman Province, Iran. At the 2006 census, its population was 849, in 180 families.
