= Vesterbotn =

Arm of a fjord in northern Norway

- Leavdnjavuotna
- Location within Finnmark Location within Norway Location within Europe
- Location: Porsanger Municipality, Finnmark County, Norway
- Coordinates: 70°5′34.43″N 24°58′38.08″E
- Type: Fjord
- Part of: Porsangerfjorden
- Average depth: 17.5 metres (57 ft)
- Max. depth: 27 metres (89 ft)
- Surface elevation: 39 metres (128 ft)

Vesterbotn (Northern Sami: Leavdnjavuotna, Kven: Lemmivuono, and Finnish: Lemmivuono) is an arm of the Porsangerfjorden located in Porsanger Municipality, Finnmark county, Norway.

== Geography ==
The fjord is particularly shallow, especially along the sides and in its outer half, Vesterbotn reaches a depth of only 8 metres (26 ft). Banak Airport is situated south of the fjord, with the northern section of the fjord being up to 27 metres (89 ft) deep, marking the fjord's deepest point. Overall, the fjord has an average depth of 17.5 metres (57 ft). The airport's runway extends nearly one kilometer into the fjord. At this point, the fjord takes a slight eastward turn before continuing south on the eastern side of Banak, forming the section known as Brennelvfjorden.

== Climate ==
Vesterbotn experiences varying weather conditions throughout the year. Located in the Arctic, this area witnesses distinct seasonal changes. The highest recorded temperature occurred in June 2022, reaching 24 °C (75 °F) during a heat wave. Conversely, the lowest recorded temperature was observed in March, reaching −17 °C (1 °F). Furthermore, the highest amount of snowfall in 2022 was 164 centimetres (65 in) on 22 March.

== Location ==
It spans the entire western side of Oldereidneset, a peninsula in Norway. The fjord features an inlet between Stabbursnes in the northwest and Reassetnjárga in the southeast, stretching 12 kilometres (7.5 mi) to its southernmost point at Lakselv, where the fjord ends.

E6 runs alongside the western side of Vesterbotn, while County Road 91 follows the eastern side of Brennelvfjorden. Brennelv and Lakselv are located at the head of Brennelvfjorden, with Lakselva flowing into the fjord west of the airport.
