= Godar Takht =

Godar Takht گدارتخت
- Village
- Country: Iran
- Province: Kerman
- County: Manujan
- Bakhsh: Central
- Rural District: Nurabad

Population (2006)
  - Total: 77
- Time zone: UTC+3:30 (IRST)
  - Summer (DST): UTC+4:30 (IRDT)

Godar Takht (Persian: گدارتخت, also Romanized as Godār Takht) is a village in Nurabad Rural District, in the Central District of Manujan County, Kerman Province, Iran. At the 2006 census, its population was 77, in 17 families.
