= Chah Amuzi =

Chah Amuzi چاه اموزي
- Village
- Location within Iran
- Coordinates: 27°26′05″N 57°35′34″E
- Country: Iran
- Province: Kerman
- County: Manujan
- Bakhsh: Central
- Rural District: Qaleh

Population (2006)
  - Total: 1,471
- Time zone: UTC+3:30 (IRST)
  - Summer (DST): UTC+4:30 (IRDT)

Chah Amuzi (Persian: چاه اموزي, also Romanized as Chāh Āmūzī and Chāhāmūzī) is a village in Qaleh Rural District, in the Central District of Manujan County, Kerman Province, Iran. At the 2006 census, its population was 1,471, in 295 families.
