= Østerbotn =

Bay in Porsanger, Finnmark, Norway

Coordinates: 70°5′45.59″N 25°9′0.39″E

Østerbotn or Austerbotn (Northern Sami: Soggovuotna, Finnish: Sokkuvuono) is the innermost part of Porsangerfjorden in Porsanger Municipality in Finnmark county, Norway.

== Details ==
The fjord stretches 9 kilometres (5.6 mi) south to the Østerbotnhalsen at the end of the fjord, a short distance east of Lakselv. The fjord runs along the east side of Oldereidneset and has an inlet between Gáhkkorláttonjárga in the west and Store Bjørnnes in the east. On the other side of Oldereidneset lies Vesterbotn and Brennelvfjorden. Østerbotn is much deeper than the shallow Vesterbotn and is 106 metres (348 ft) at its deepest, a good distance out into the fjord. There are several smaller settlements along the fjord, such as Handelsbukt and Fluberg on the east side, and Hamnbukt on the west side.

County Road 98 runs along the end and east side of the fjord.
