= Chil Dahanu =

Chil Dahanu چيل دهنو
- Village
- Location within Iran
- Coordinates: 27°30′31″N 57°53′42″E
- Country: Iran
- Province: Kerman
- County: Manujan
- Bakhsh: Central
- Rural District: Qaleh

Population (2006)
  - Total: 621
- Time zone: UTC+3:30 (IRST)
  - Summer (DST): UTC+4:30 (IRDT)

Chil Dahanu (Persian: چيل دهنو, also Romanized as Chīl Dahanū; also known as Chīlābād) is a village in Qaleh Rural District, in the Central District of Manujan County, Kerman Province, Iran. At the 2006 census, its population was 621, in 120 families.
