= Rowzeh-ye Eram =

Rowzeh-ye Eram روضه ارم
- Village
- Location within Iran
- Coordinates: 27°19′13″N 57°29′38″E
- Country: Iran
- Province: Kerman
- County: Manujan
- Bakhsh: Central
- Rural District: Nurabad

Population (2006)
  - Total: 157
- Time zone: UTC+3:30 (IRST)
  - Summer (DST): UTC+4:30 (IRDT)

Rowzeh-ye Eram (Persian: روضه ارم, also Romanized as Rowẕeh-ye Eram; also known as Rowẕeh-ye Ḩaram) is a village in Nurabad Rural District, in the Central District of Manujan County, Kerman Province, Iran. At the 2006 census, its population was 157, in 32 families.
