= Mogh Mohammad =

Mogh Mohammad مغ محمد
- Village
- Location within Iran
- Coordinates: 27°20′43″N 57°47′10″E
- Country: Iran
- Province: Kerman
- County: Manujan
- Bakhsh: Central
- Rural District: Qaleh

Population (2006)
  - Total: 127
- Time zone: UTC+3:30 (IRST)
  - Summer (DST): UTC+4:30 (IRDT)

Mogh Mohammad (Persian: مغ محمد, also Romanized as Mogh Moḩammad and Mogh-e Moḩammad) is a village in Qaleh Rural District, in the Central District of Manujan County, Kerman Province, Iran. At the 2006 census, its population was 127, in 32 families.
