= Abnama =

Abnama ابنما
- Village
- Location within Iran
- Coordinates: 27°15′24″N 57°52′28″E
- Country: Iran
- Province: Kerman
- County: Manujan
- Bakhsh: Central
- Rural District: Geshmiran

Population (2006)
  - Total: 64
- Time zone: UTC+3:30 (IRST)
  - Summer (DST): UTC+4:30 (IRDT)

Abnama (Persian: ابنما, also Romanized as Ābnamā) is a village in Geshmiran Rural District, in the Central District of Manujan County, Kerman Province, Iran. At the 2006 census, its population was 64, in 10 families.
