= Bon-e Hur =

Bon-e Hur بن هور
- Village
- Location within Iran
- Coordinates: 27°18′26″N 57°33′57″E
- Country: Iran
- Province: Kerman
- County: Manujan
- Bakhsh: Central
- Rural District: Qaleh

Population (2006)
  - Total: 69
- Time zone: UTC+3:30 (IRST)
  - Summer (DST): UTC+4:30 (IRDT)

Bon-e Hur (Persian: بن هور, also Romanized as Bon-e Hūr; also known as Bon-e ‘Ūr) is a village in Qaleh Rural District, in the Central District of Manujan County, Kerman Province, Iran. At the 2006 census, its population was 69, in 15 families.
