= Bongajg =

Bongajg بن گجگ
- Village
- Location within Iran
- Coordinates: 27°16′08″N 57°33′30″E
- Country: Iran
- Province: Kerman
- County: Manujan
- Bakhsh: Central
- Rural District: Nurabad

Population (2006)
  - Total: 36
- Time zone: UTC+3:30 (IRST)
  - Summer (DST): UTC+4:30 (IRDT)

Bongajg (Persian: بن گجگ) is a village in Nurabad Rural District, in the Central District of Manujan County, Kerman Province, Iran. At the 2006 census, its population was 36, in 7 families.
