= Nowrudbar =

Nowrudbar نورودبار
- Village
- Location within Iran
- Coordinates: 27°21′30″N 57°52′55″E
- Country: Iran
- Province: Kerman
- County: Manujan
- Bakhsh: Central
- Rural District: Qaleh

Population (2006)
  - Total: 51
- Time zone: UTC+3:30 (IRST)
  - Summer (DST): UTC+4:30 (IRDT)

Nowrudbar (Persian: نورودبار, also Romanized as Nowrūdbār) is a village in Qaleh Rural District, in the Central District of Manujan County, Kerman Province, Iran. At the 2006 census, its population was 51, in 11 families.
