= Dahandar Mig =

Dahandar Mig دهندرميگ
- Village
- Location within Iran
- Coordinates: 27°08′55″N 57°35′39″E
- Country: Iran
- Province: Kerman
- County: Manujan
- Bakhsh: Central
- Rural District: Geshmiran

Population (2006)
  - Total: 27
- Time zone: UTC+3:30 (IRST)
  - Summer (DST): UTC+4:30 (IRDT)

Dahandar Mig (Persian: دهندرميگ, also Romanized as Dahandar Mīg) is a village in Geshmiran Rural District, in the Central District of Manujan County, Kerman Province, Iran. At the 2006 census, its population was 27, in 5 families.
