= Tomzardan =

Tomzardan تم زردان
- Village
- Location within Iran
- Coordinates: 27°24′37″N 57°44′46″E
- Country: Iran
- Province: Kerman
- County: Manujan
- Bakhsh: Central
- Rural District: Qaleh

Population (2006)
  - Total: 253
- Time zone: UTC+3:30 (IRST)
  - Summer (DST): UTC+4:30 (IRDT)

Tomzardan (Persian: تم زردان, also Romanized as Tomzardān) is a village in Qaleh Rural District, in the Central District of Manujan County, Kerman Province, Iran. At the 2006 census, its population was 253, in 58 families.
