= Gimord =

Gimord گيمرد
- Village
- Location within Iran
- Coordinates: 27°14′49″N 57°43′10″E
- Country: Iran
- Province: Kerman
- County: Manujan
- Bakhsh: Central
- Rural District: Qaleh

Population (2006)
  - Total: 55
- Time zone: UTC+3:30 (IRST)
  - Summer (DST): UTC+4:30 (IRDT)

Gimord (Persian: گيمرد, also Romanized as Gīmord; also known as Gīvmard) is a village in Qaleh Rural District, in the Central District of Manujan County, Kerman Province, Iran. At the 2006 census, its population was 55, in 13 families.
