= Ab Gel =

Ab Gel or Ab Gol or Abgel or Abgol (Persian: ابگل) may refer to:

- Abgol, Fars
- Ab Gel, Kerman
- Ab Gol, Kohgiluyeh and Boyer-Ahmad
