= Sungan =

Sungan سونگان
- Village
- Interactive map of Sungan
- Country: Iran
- Province: Kerman
- County: Manujan
- Bakhsh: Central
- Rural District: Qaleh

Population (2006)
  - Total: 28
- Time zone: UTC+3:30 (IRST)
  - Summer (DST): UTC+4:30 (IRDT)

Sungan (Persian: سونگان, also romanized as Sūngān) is a city in Qaleh Rural District, in the Central District of Manujan County, Kerman Province, Iran. At the 2006 census, its population was 28, in 4 families.
