= Posht-e Sar =

Posht-e Sar پشت سر
- Village
- Location within Iran
- Coordinates: 26°59′46″N 57°54′50″E
- Country: Iran
- Province: Kerman
- County: Manujan
- Bakhsh: Central
- Rural District: Geshmiran

Population (2006)
  - Total: 189
- Time zone: UTC+3:30 (IRST)
  - Summer (DST): UTC+4:30 (IRDT)

Posht-e Sar (Persian: پشت سر) is a village in Geshmiran Rural District, in the Central District of Manujan County, Kerman Province, Iran. At the 2006 census, its population was 189, in 39 families.
