= Rigzar-e Riz =

Rigzar-e Riz ريگ زرريز
- Village
- Location within Iran
- Coordinates: 27°26′34″N 57°33′06″E
- Country: Iran
- Province: Kerman
- County: Manujan
- Bakhsh: Central
- Rural District: Qaleh

Population (2006)
  - Total: 777
- Time zone: UTC+3:30 (IRST)
  - Summer (DST): UTC+4:30 (IRDT)

Rigzar-e Riz (Persian: ريگ زرريز, also Romanized as Rīgzar-e Rīz) is a village in Qaleh Rural District, in the Central District of Manujan County, Kerman Province, Iran. At the 2006 census, its population was 777, in 158 families.
