= Abbadbibi =

Abbadbibi ابادبي بي
- Village
- Location within Iran
- Coordinates: 27°17′53″N 57°27′55″E
- Country: Iran
- Province: Kerman
- County: Manujan
- Bakhsh: Central
- Rural District: Nurabad

Population (2006)
  - Total: 299
- Time zone: UTC+3:30 (IRST)
  - Summer (DST): UTC+4:30 (IRDT)

Abbadbibi (Persian: ابادبي بي, also Romanized as Ābbādbībī) is a village in Nurabad Rural District, in the Central District of Manujan County, Kerman Province, Iran. At the 2006 census, its population was 299, in 74 families.
