= Dar Eshkut =

Dar Eshkut دراشكوت
- Village
- Location within Iran
- Coordinates: 27°18′26″N 57°40′41″E
- Country: Iran
- Province: Kerman
- County: Manujan
- Bakhsh: Central
- Rural District: Qaleh

Population (2006)
  - Total: 33
- Time zone: UTC+3:30 (IRST)
  - Summer (DST): UTC+4:30 (IRDT)

Dar Eshkut (Persian: دراشكوت, also Romanized as Dar Eshkūt; also known as Dar Eshkū and Darreh Eshkū) is a village in Qaleh Rural District, in the Central District of Manujan County, Kerman Province, Iran. At the 2006 census, its population was 33, in 6 families.
