= Kahur Lut =

Kahur Lut كهورلوت
- Village
- Location within Iran
- Coordinates: 27°16′35″N 57°51′05″E
- Country: Iran
- Province: Kerman
- County: Manujan
- Bakhsh: Central
- Rural District: Geshmiran

Population (2006)
  - Total: 28
- Time zone: UTC+3:30 (IRST)
  - Summer (DST): UTC+4:30 (IRDT)

Kahur Lut (Persian: كهورلوت, also Romanized as Kahūr Lūt) is a village in Geshmiran Rural District, in the Central District of Manujan County, Kerman Province, Iran. At the 2006 census, its population was 28, in 9 families.
