= Now Dozu =

Now Dozu نودزو
- Village
- Location within Iran
- Coordinates: 27°14′39″N 57°37′43″E
- Country: Iran
- Province: Kerman
- County: Manujan
- Bakhsh: Central
- Rural District: Qaleh

Population (2006)
  - Total: 18
- Time zone: UTC+3:30 (IRST)
  - Summer (DST): UTC+4:30 (IRDT)

Now Dozu (Persian: نودزو, also Romanized as Now Dozū; also known as Nowdozo) is a village in Qaleh Rural District, in the Central District of Manujan County, Kerman Province, Iran. At the 2006 census, its population was 18, in 4 families.
