= Sar Garu =

Sar Garu سرگرو
- Village
- Location within Iran
- Coordinates: 27°14′53″N 57°40′43″E
- Country: Iran
- Province: Kerman
- County: Manujan
- Bakhsh: Central
- Rural District: Qaleh

Population (2006)
  - Total: 132
- Time zone: UTC+3:30 (IRST)
  - Summer (DST): UTC+4:30 (IRDT)

Sar Garu (Persian: سرگرو, also Romanized as Sar Garū) is a village in Qaleh Rural District, in the Central District of Manujan County, Kerman Province, Iran. At the 2006 census, its population was 132, in 24 families.
