= Rustai-ye Choghuki =

Rustai-ye Choghuki روستاي چغوکي
- Village
- Location within Iran
- Coordinates: 27°26′37″N 57°34′34″E
- Country: Iran
- Province: Kerman
- County: Manujan
- Bakhsh: Central
- Rural District: Qaleh

Population (2006)
  - Total: 948
- Time zone: UTC+3:30 (IRST)
  - Summer (DST): UTC+4:30 (IRDT)

Rustai-ye Choghuki (Persian: روستاي چغوکي, also Romanized as Rūstāī-ye Choghūkī; also known as Choghūkī) is a village in Qaleh Rural District, in the Central District of Manujan County, Kerman Province, Iran. At the 2006 census, its population was 948, in 176 families.
