= Stabbursnes Nature Reserve =

Protected area in Finnmark County, Norway

- Stabbursnes Naturhus
- IUCN category II (national park)
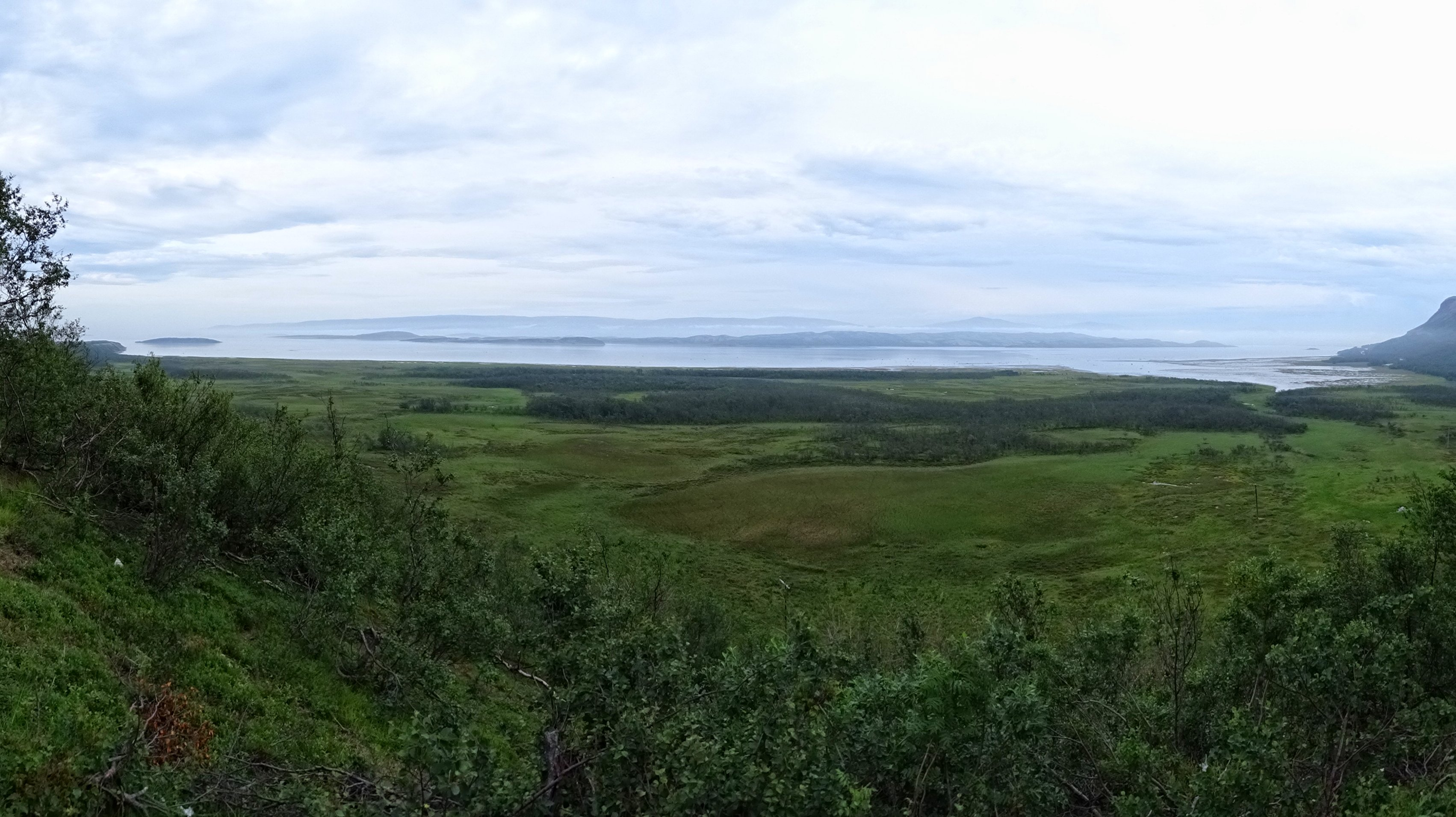
- Panoramic view of Stabbursnes Nature Reserve
- Interactive map of Stabbursnes Nature Reserve
- Location: Porsanger Municipality, Finnmark county, northern Norway
- Coordinates: 70°10′45″N 24°54′34″E
- Area: 16 km^{2} (6.2 sq mi)
- Established: 1983
- Governing body: Norwegian Directorate for Nature Management
- Website: https://www.stabbursnes.no/home/

Stabbursnes Nature Reserve (Norwegian: Stabbursnes Naturreservat) is a protected area located in Porsanger Municipality, Finnmark County, northern Norway. It has many habitats, including forests, wetlands, and rivers.

== Geography and location ==
Situated on the southern bank of the Stabburselva River, the Stabbursnes Nature Reserve covers an area of approximately 16 square kilometres (6.2 sq mi). It is positioned in the municipality of Porsanger, approximately 20 kilometres (12 mi) southwest of the village of Lakselv. The reserve extends from the river delta and its bordering floodplains to the mountainous areas further inland.

== History ==
The Sami (or Sámi) people have inhabited the Finnmark region for centuries, relying on reindeer herding and fishing. These activities have been closely tied to the Stabbursnes Nature Reserve as an area of great importance to the Sami and the conservation of the natural environment.

Recognizing the significance of Stabbursnes, the Norwegian government designated it as a nature reserve in 1983. Since then, the reserve has been managed with a focus on maintaining conservation and sustainable resource use.

Ongoing research and monitoring have been conducted within the reserve to understand its ecosystems better and inform effective management strategies.

== Flora and fauna ==
Stabbursnes Nature Reserve has various plants and animal species that have adapted to the Arctic environment. The reserve's forests primarily consist of coniferous trees such as pine (Pinus sylvestris) and birch (Betula spp.), providing a habitat for numerous bird species like the Siberian jay (Perisoreus infaustus) and the European pied flycatcher (Ficedula hypoleuca).

The Stabburselva River, which runs through the reserve, supports a population of salmon (Salmo salar) and sea trout (Salmo trutta). These fish species are highly valued both ecologically and economically and play a vital role in the local ecosystem. Additionally, the river attracts various waterfowl, including the common merganser (Mergus merganser) and the Arctic tern (Sterna paradisaea).

== Cultural heritage ==
Stabbursnes Nature Reserve holds significant cultural importance, as it is home to the indigenous Sami (or Sámi) people, who have inhabited the region for centuries. The Sami, traditionally a nomadic reindeer-herding community, have a deep connection to the land and continue to practicing their cultural heritage there.

One of the notable cultural landmarks within the reserve is the Stabbursnes Sami Museum. The museum showcases the Sami way of life, displaying traditional artifacts, clothing, and tools the indigenous population uses. It is an educational and cultural center, showing insights into Sami history, traditions, and their relationship with nature.

== Preservation and management ==
Stabbursnes Nature Reserve is managed by the Norwegian Directorate for Nature Management, with the primary goal of preserving its unique ecosystems and cultural heritage. Conservation efforts aim to maintain the natural balance, protect vulnerable species, and ensure sustainable use of the reserve's resources.

Strict regulations govern activities within the reserve to minimize human environmental impact. These regulations include restrictions on fishing practices, camping, and off-trail exploration to minimize the environmental impact.
