= Marich =

Marich may refer to:

== People ==
- Marietta Marich (1930–2017), American actress and director
- George Marich (born 1992), South African rugby union player
- László Szőgyény-Marich (disambiguation)

== Places ==
- Marich, Iran, a village in Kerman Province, Iran
- Marich, Kenya, a town in Kenya, north of Nairobi where a cement works is proposed

== Others ==
- Maricha, a demon in the Indian epic Ramayana
- Maarrich, a 2022 Indian murder mystery film by Dhruv Lather
- Maareesan (lit. 'Maricha'), a 2025 Indian drama thriller film by Sudheesh Sankar

== See also ==
- Marici (disambiguation)
- Marić
