= Durkan-e Pain =

Durkan-e Pain دوركان پائين
- Village
- Location within Iran
- Coordinates: 27°09′37″N 57°50′31″E
- Country: Iran
- Province: Kerman
- County: Manujan
- Bakhsh: Central
- Rural District: Geshmiran

Population (2006)
  - Total: 21
- Time zone: UTC+3:30 (IRST)
  - Summer (DST): UTC+4:30 (IRDT)

Durkan-e Pain (Persian: دوركان پائين, also Romanized as Dūrkān-e Pā’īn; also known as Dūrkān-e Pāeen) is a village in Geshmiran Rural District, in the Central District of Manujan County, Kerman Province, Iran. At the 2006 census, its population was 21, in 5 families.
