= Bonkaram =

Bonkaram (Persian: بنكرم) may refer to:

- Bonkaram, Hormozgan
- Bonkaram, Kerman
