= Sakukan =

Sakukan or Sekukan (Persian: سكوكان) may refer to:

- Sakukan, Manujan
- Sekukan, Zarand
