= Ab Damil =

Ab Damil (Persian: اب دميل) may refer to:

- Ab Damil, Hormozgan
- Ab Damil, Kerman
