= Gazhak, Kerman =

Gazhak گزهك
- village
- Location within Iran
- Coordinates: 27°18′00″N 57°56′07″E
- Country: Iran
- Province: Kerman
- County: Manujan
- Bakhsh: Central
- Rural District: Qaleh

Population (2006)
  - Total: 420
- Time zone: UTC+3:30 (IRST)
  - Summer (DST): UTC+4:30 (IRDT)
- ISO 3166 code: IRN

Gazhak (Persian: گزهك) is a village in Qaleh Rural District, in the Central District of Manujan County, Kerman Province, Iran. At the 2006 census, its population was 420, in 118 families.
