= Saras =

Saras (in some cases written variously as Sarras) may refer to:

- Saras, Sudan (sometimes divided into "Saras East" and "West" by its placement along the Nile)
- Saras S.p.A., oil refining company of the Massimo Moratti family
- National Aerospace Laboratories (NAL) Saras
- Saras, Iran
- Saras, Kerman, Iran
- Šarūnas Jasikevičius, Lithuanian basketball player

== See also ==
- Sarasa (disambiguation)
- Sarras (disambiguation)
