= Qadirpur =

Qadirpur قديرپور
- Village
- Location within Iran
- Coordinates: 27°27′45″N 57°32′07″E
- Country: Iran
- Province: Kerman
- County: Manujan
- Bakhsh: Central
- Rural District: Qaleh

Population (2006)
  - Total: 676
- Time zone: UTC+3:30 (IRST)
  - Summer (DST): UTC+4:30 (IRDT)

Qadirpur (Persian: قديرپور, also Romanized as Qadīrpūr) is a village in Qaleh Rural District, in the Central District of Manujan County, Kerman Province, Iran. At the 2006 census, its population was 676, in 139 families.
