= Durkan =

Durkan may refer to:

== Geography ==
- Durkan-e Bala - Upper Durkan, a village in Kerman Province, Iran
- Durkan-e Pain - Lower Durkan, a village in Kerman Province, Iran

== People ==
- Bernard Durkan (b. 1945), Irish politician
- Frank Durkan (1930-2006), American lawyer
- Jenny Durkan, American politician
- Kieron Durkan (1973-2018), footballer
- Mark Durkan (b. 1960), Northern Irish politician
- Mark H. Durkan, Northern Irish politician
- Martin Durkan (1923-2005), American attorney, politician, and lobbyist

== See also ==
- Durkan's test
