= Choghuki =

Choghuki (Persian: چغوکي) may refer to:

- Choghuki-ye Olya
- Rustai-ye Choghuki
