= Bonkaram, Kerman =

Bonkaram بنكرم
- Village
- Location within Iran
- Coordinates: 27°14′57″N 57°48′30″E
- Country: Iran
- Province: Kerman
- County: Manujan
- Bakhsh: Central
- Rural District: Qaleh

Population (2006)
  - Total: 54
- Time zone: UTC+3:30 (IRST)
  - Summer (DST): UTC+4:30 (IRDT)

Bonkaram (Persian: بنكرم) is a village in Qaleh Rural District, in the Central District of Manujan County, Kerman Province, Iran. At the 2006 census, its population was 54, in 8 families.
