= Ab Gel, Kerman =

Ab Gel ابگل
- Village
- Location within Iran
- Coordinates: 27°02′00″N 57°52′41″E
- Country: Iran
- Province: Kerman
- County: Manujan
- Bakhsh: Central
- Rural District: Geshmiran

Population (2006)
  - Total: 108
- Time zone: UTC+3:30 (IRST)
  - Summer (DST): UTC+4:30 (IRDT)

Ab Gel (Persian: ابگل, also Romanized as Āb Gel) is a village in Geshmiran Rural District, in the Central District of Manujan County, Kerman Province, Iran. At the 2006 census, its population was 108, in 30 families.
