= Stabbursnes Naturhus og Museum =

Museum in Finnmark county, Norway

Coordinates: 70.17921°N 24.90960°E

The Stabbursnes Naturhus og Museum (English: Stabbursnes Naturehouse and Museum) is a cultural and natural heritage institution located in Porsanger Municipality in Finnmark county, Norway. Located on the banks of the Stabburselva River, the museum displays the history, nature, and cultural traditions of the surrounding region. It is in both the Stabbursdalen National Park and Stabbursnes Nature Reserve, the world's northernmost pine forest.

== Geography ==
The region surrounding the museum includes forests, mountainous terrain, and rivers. The Stabburselva River, which flows near the museum, is notable for its clear waters and serves as a habitat for various fish species, such as salmon and trout. It runs through the Stabbursdalen Valley. There are several hiking trails in the area.

=== Climate ===
The climate in the region is classified as having a subarctic climate, which means that it has cold winters and cool summers. The area experiences noticeable seasonal differences, with snow cover during the winter months and a relatively short summer period. The animals and plants in the regions have had to adapt to live in the subarctic climate.

== History ==
The Stabbursnes Naturehouse and Museum was established in 1990 as a joint effort between the Porsanger Museum and the Norwegian Institute for Nature Research (NINA). The museum was created as a center for research, education, and conservation, focusing on the unique ecosystems found in the area and the traditional Sámi culture.

== Exhibitions and collections ==
The museum's exhibitions explain the natural and cultural heritage of Stabbursdalen National Park and its surroundings. The displays include topics like geology, flora and fauna, Sámi history and traditions, and the conservation efforts in the region.

One of the main attractions of the museum is the Sámi cultural exhibition, which showcases the customs, crafts, and traditional way of life of the indigenous Sami people. Finds from the ice-ages in this area have been linked to the Sami people.

In addition to the cultural displays, the museum features natural history exhibits that explain the ecosystems and wildlife of the Stabbursdalen area. Visitors can learn about the various plant and animal species that inhabit the national park, including rare and endangered species such as the Arctic fox and the golden eagle.

The museum also houses a significant collection of artifacts, photographs, and documents related to the local history and Sami heritage.

== Research and conservation ==
The museum conducts scientific research to better understand the ecosystems, wildlife, and heritage of Stabbursdalen National Park. These research efforts provide have helped better understand the surrounding region. The museum works with policymakers to protect endangered species and habitats, including habitat restoration and wildlife population monitoring.

== See also ==
- Stabbursdalen National Park
- Sami people
