= Marich, Iran =

Marich مريچ
- Village
- Location within Iran
- Coordinates: 27°04′28″N 57°54′03″E
- Country: Iran
- Province: Kerman
- County: Manujan
- Bakhsh: Central
- Rural District: Geshmiran

Population (2006)
  - Total: 39
- Time zone: UTC+3:30 (IRST)
  - Summer (DST): UTC+4:30 (IRDT)

Marich (Persian: مريچ, also Romanized as Marīch; also known as Marīj) is a village in Geshmiran Rural District, Central District, Manujan County, Kerman Province, Iran. At the 2006 census, its population was 39, in 7 families.
