= Geshmiran =

Village in Kerman province, Iran

Geshmiran Persian: گشميران
- Village
- Location within Iran
- Coordinates: 27°06′33″N 57°55′12″E
- Country: Iran
- Province: Kerman
- County: Manujan
- District: Central
- Rural District: Geshmiran

Population (2016)
  - Total: 526
- Time zone: UTC+3:30 (IRST)

Geshmiran (Persian: گشميران) (Note: Also romanized as Gashmiran and Geshmīrān; also known as Keshmīrān) is a village in, and the capital of, Geshmiran Rural District (Note: Formerly Poshtkuh Rural District) of the Central District of Manujan County, Kerman province, Iran.

== Demographics ==
=== Population ===
At the time of the 2006 National Census, the village's population was 421 in 106 households. The following census in 2011 counted 398 people in 97 households. The 2016 census measured the population of the village as 526 people in 139 households. It was the most populous village in its rural district.
