= Darkaz Baluk =

Darkaz Baluk دركزبلوك
- Village
- Location within Iran
- Coordinates: 27°06′06″N 57°33′27″E
- Country: Iran
- Province: Kerman
- County: Manujan
- Bakhsh: Central
- Rural District: Geshmiran

Population (2006)
  - Total: 46
- Time zone: UTC+3:30 (IRST)
  - Summer (DST): UTC+4:30 (IRDT)

Darkaz Baluk (Persian: دركزبلوك, also Romanized as Darkaz Balūk; also known as Dargaz Kūlak) is a village in Geshmiran Rural District, in the Central District of Manujan County, Kerman Province, Iran. At the 2006 census, its population was 46, in 12 families.
