= Choghuki-ye Olya =

Choghuki-ye Olya چغوکي عليا
- Village
- Location within Iran
- Coordinates: 27°27′25″N 57°35′01″E
- Country: Iran
- Province: Kerman
- County: Manujan
- Bakhsh: Central
- Rural District: Qaleh

Population (2006)
  - Total: 1,094
- Time zone: UTC+3:30 (IRST)
  - Summer (DST): UTC+4:30 (IRDT)

Choghuki-ye Olya (Persian: چغوکي عليا, also Romanized as Choghūkī-ye 'Olyā; also known as Chaghūkī) is a village in Qaleh Rural District, in the Central District of Manujan County, Kerman province, Iran. At the 2006 census, its population was 1,094, in 210 families.
