= Tejdanu =

Village in Kerman province, Iran

Tejdanu Persian: تجدانو
- Village
- Location within Iran
- Coordinates: 27°18′43″N 57°30′55″E
- Country: Iran
- Province: Kerman
- County: Manujan
- District: Central
- Rural District: Nurabad

Population (2016)
  - Total: 1,110
- Time zone: UTC+3:30 (IRST)

Tejdanu (Persian: تجدانو) (Note: Also romanized as Tajdanoo and Tejdānū; also known as Nezhdānlū and Tizdānu) is a village in Nurabad Rural District of the Central District of Manujan County, Kerman province, Iran.

== Demographics ==
=== Population ===
At the time of the 2006 National Census, the village's population was 885 in 219 households. The following census in 2011 counted 1,099 people in 282 households. The 2016 census measured the population of the village as 1,110 people in 332 households. It was the most populous village in its rural district.
