= Naziabad =

Naziabad (Persian: نازی آباد) may refer to:

- Nazi Abad, Tehran neighborhood
- Naziabad, Chaharmahal and Bakhtiari
- Naziabad, Manujan, Kerman Province
- Naziabad, Rafsanjan, Kerman Province
