= Sakukan, Manujan =

Sakukan سكوكان
- Village
- Location within Iran
- Coordinates: 27°01′13″N 57°54′42″E
- Country: Iran
- Province: Kerman
- County: Manujan
- Bakhsh: Central
- Rural District: Geshmiran

Population (2006)
  - Total: 138
- Time zone: UTC+3:30 (IRST)
  - Summer (DST): UTC+4:30 (IRDT)

Sakukan (Persian: سكوكان, also Romanized as Sakūkān) is a village in Geshmiran Rural District, in the Central District of Manujan County, Kerman Province, Iran. At the 2006 census, its population was 138, in 35 families.
