= Chah-e Shahi =

Village in Kerman province, Iran

Chah-e Shahi Persian: چاه شاهي
- Village
- Location within Iran
- Coordinates: 27°14′03″N 57°30′46″E
- Country: Iran
- Province: Kerman
- County: Manujan
- District: Central
- Rural District: Nurabad

Population (2016)
  - Total: 957
- Time zone: UTC+3:30 (IRST)

Chah-e Shahi (Persian: چاه شاهي (Note: Also known as Nurabad (نورآباد)) is a village in, and the capital of, Nurabad Rural District of the Central District of Manujan County, Kerman province, Iran.

== Demographics ==
=== Population ===
At the time of the 2006 National Census, the village's population was 954 in 267 households. The following census in 2011 counted 1,086 people in 292 households. The 2016 census measured the population of the village as 957 people in 259 households.
