= Sirsa (disambiguation) =

Sirsa is a city and municipal council in Haryana, India.

Sirsa may also refer to:

== Places ==
- Sirsa district, the district of the Indian city
- Sirsa (tehsil), a tehsil (sub-district) of Sirsa district, centred on the city
- Sirsa (Lok Sabha constituency), a Lok Sabha (Indian parliamentary) constituency centred on the city
  - Sirsa (Vidhan Sabha constituency), in the Haryana Legislative Assembly
- Sirsa, Uttar Pradesh, a town and nagar panchayat in Uttar Pradesh, India
- Sirsa, Mainpuri, a village in Uttar Pradesh, India
- Sirsa, Raebareli, a village in Uttar Pradesh, India

== Other uses ==
- Sirsa (1983), a steamship owned by the British India Steam Navigation Company
- Sirsa Air Force Station, an Indian Air Force station in Sirsa

== See also ==
- Sarsa (disambiguation)
