= Sarasa =

Sarasa may refer to:

== Places ==
- Sarasa, Altai Krai, a rural locality in Russia
- Sarasa River, Guam
- Sarasa, a village in Iza – Itza, Navarre, Spain

== People ==
- Sarasa Balussery, Indian actress
- Sarasa Venkatanarayana Bhatti (born 1962), judge of the Supreme Court of India
- Alphonse Antonio de Sarasa (1618–1667), Jesuit mathematician

== Other uses ==
- Sarasa, the female protagonist of the manga Basara, by Tamura Yumi
- Sarasa, a type of comet goldfish
- Sarasa (pen), a brand of gel pen sold by Japanese manufacturer Zebra
- Sarasa, the name of a floral design
- Sarasa, a slang term used in Spain to refer to a effeminate man

== See also ==
- Sarsa (disambiguation)
