= Chah Narenj =

Chah Narenj or Chahnarenj (Persian: چاه نارنج) may refer to:

- Chah Narenj, Faryab
- Chahnarenj, Manujan
