= Sarras (disambiguation) =

Sarras may refer to:

- Sarras, a legendary location in the King Arthur legends
- Sarras, Ardèche, a commune in France
- Sarras, Iran

== See also ==
- Saras (disambiguation), including some sites variously written as "Sarras"
