= Naziabad, Manujan =

Naziabad نازي اباد
- Village
- Location within Iran
- Coordinates: 27°27′59″N 57°34′25″E
- Country: Iran
- Province: Kerman
- County: Manujan
- Bakhsh: Central
- Rural District: Qaleh

Population (2006)
  - Total: 283
- Time zone: UTC+3:30 (IRST)
  - Summer (DST): UTC+4:30 (IRDT)

Naziabad (Persian: نازي اباد, also Romanized as Nāzīābād) is a village in Qaleh Rural District, in the Central District of Manujan County, Kerman Province, Iran. At the 2006 census, its population was 283, in 58 families.
