= Gazhak =

Gazhak or Gazahak (Persian: گزهك) may refer to:

- Gazhak, Kerman
- Gazhak, Sistan and Baluchestan
