= List of Iranian artists killed during 2026 massacres =

The following is a list of Iranian artists, musicians, actors, filmmakers, photographers, and cultural workers reported by human rights organizations and news outlets to have been killed during government suppression of the 2026 Iranian protests.

== Background ==
Nationwide protests erupted across Iran on 8 January 2026 following a series of political and economic grievances, rapidly spreading to dozens of cities across the country.Iranian authorities responded with a large-scale security crackdown involving the deployment of police forces, Basij militia units, and other state security institutions. During this period, the Iranian government has perpetrated widespread massacres of civilians to suppress public dissent nationwide.

Human rights organizations reported widespread use of lethal force against demonstrators, mass arrests, enforced disappearances, internet shutdowns, and restrictions on journalists and independent monitors. As of 25 January 2026, the total death toll estimates ranged from 6,488 people to upwards of ~36,500 people. Amnesty International described the events as "the deadliest period of repression by the Iranian authorities in decades".

During the crackdown, a number of Iranian artists and cultural workers were reported killed in different parts of the country, including musicians, actors, filmmakers, photographers, theatre practitioners, and writers. Several international organizations, including Artists at Risk Connection and Hengaw Organization for Human Rights, documented the deaths of artists as part of broader efforts to record civilian casualties during the protests.

The scale of the killings remains disputed. Iranian state media reported 3,117 deaths during the protests, while the Human Rights Activists News Agency (HRANA) reported thousands of confirmed civilian deaths and additional cases under investigation. Reporting and documentation efforts were complicated by nationwide internet restrictions and limitations imposed on journalists and independent observers.

== Partial list ==
The following is a partial list of Iranian artists and cultural workers reported killed during the 2026 Iranian protest crackdown.

Name	Profession	Age	Date of death	Location	Reference
Soroush Soleimani	Hip Hop Artist	28	4 January 2026	Hafshejan	
Mahan Qadami	Rapper	23	4 January 2026	Eslamshahr	
Ahmad Abbasi	Theatre director and actor		8 January 2026	Tehran	
Mohadiseh Shahbazi	Multidisciplinary Artist	20	8 January 2026	Tehran	
Amirhossein Malekshahi	Singer and Musician	28	8 January 2026	Tehran	
Rubina Aminian	Textile Designer	23	8 January 2026	Tehran	
Yaghoub Dalir	Singer and Musician	47	8 January 2026	Astaneh-ye Ashrafiyeh	
Mehdi Salahshour	Sculptor	50	8 January 2026	Mashhad	
Hossein Tehranchi	Musician	31	8 January 2026	Narmak, Tehran	
Yaser Modir Rousta	Musician		8 January 2026	Karaj	
Foad Safaei	Singer	24	8 January 2026	Karaj	
Melika Dastyab	Kurdish Musician	21	8 January 2026	Kermanshah	
Pouya Faragerdi	Musician	37	8 January 2026	Majidiieh, Tehran	
Aria Honarmand	Rapper	27	8 January 2026	Naziabad, Tehran	
Ghazal Aghaei Lindi	Photographer	28	9 January 2026	Tehran	
Reyhaneh Yousefi	Actress	28	9 January 2026	Tehran	
Abolfazl Yaghmouri	Rapper	17	9 January 2026	Karaj	
Babak Jamali	Singer		9 January 2026	Arak	
Javad Ganji	Filmmaker	39	9 January 2026	Sadeghiyeh, Tehran	
Sahba Rashtian	Visual artist	23	15 January 2026	Isfahan	
Shokoufeh Abdi	Photographer		18 January 2026	Arak	
Sanam Pour Babayi	Violinist	26	18 January 2026	Lahijan	
Amir Ali Zarei	Musician	35	18 January 2026	Tehran	
Shabnam Ferdowsi	Puppet maker and graphic artist	37	18 January 2026	Tehran	
Zohreh Shamaizadeh	Script Supervisor and Actress		(unclear) January 2026	(unknown)	

== Repression of artistic expression ==
Human rights organizations and advocacy groups have documented increasing restrictions on artistic expression in Iran in the years preceding the 2026 protest crackdown. Following the outbreak of the Woman, Life, Freedom movement in 2022, several reports described intensified censorship, surveillance, arrests, work bans, and prosecutions targeting artists, musicians, filmmakers, and cultural workers.

According to a 2024 report published by the Artistic Freedom Initiative and Voices Unbound, Iranian authorities increased efforts to control artistic production and public expression through legal prosecution, online monitoring, and restrictions imposed on cultural figures accused of supporting protest movements.

The report documented cases involving visual artists, musicians, filmmakers, photographers, and performers prosecuted under laws relating to national security, propaganda, and public morality.
