= Station Group Banak =

Norwegian military airbase

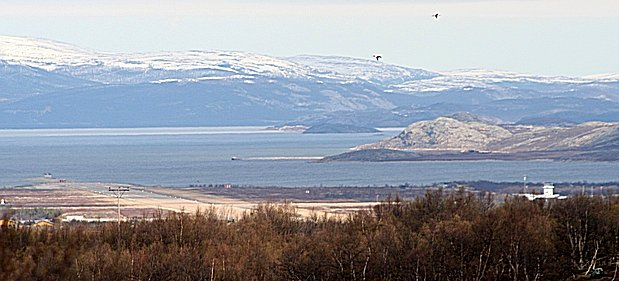
- IATA: LKL; ICAO: ENNA

Summary
- Airport type: Joint (military and civilian)
- Operator: Royal Norwegian Air Force
- Location: Banak, Porsanger, Finnmark, Norway
- Elevation AMSL: 8 m / 25 ft
- Coordinates: 70°04′00″N 24°58′26″E

Map

Runways
| Direction | Length | | Surface |
| Direction | m | ft | Surface |
|---|---|---|---|
| 17/35 | 2,784 | 9,134 | Asphalt, some concrete |

Station Group Banak (Norwegian: Stasjonsgruppe Banak), formerly Banak Air Station (Banak flystasjon), is a military airbase located at Banak, just north of Lakselv in Porsanger Municipality in Finnmark, Norway. Operated by the Royal Norwegian Air Force (RNoAF), it serves a detachment of the 330 Squadron, which operates two Westland Sea King helicopters used for search and rescue operations in Finnmark, Svalbard and surrounding Arctic sea areas (the northern Norwegian Sea, the Barents Sea and the Arctic Sea). Of the station's two helicopters, one is on standby at any given time. The station group is co-located with the civilian Lakselv Airport, Banak and is administratively under the 132nd Air Wing and Bodø Main Air Station. Banak is RNoAF's most northerly base and has fifty employees.

The airfield was first built with triangular runways in 1938. It was captured by the Luftwaffe in 1940, who expanded it and laid down two wooden runways. Banak was taken over by the RNoAF in 1945, but abandoned in 1952. Plans for re-opening emerged in 1955, but uncertainty regarding its value in a war caused a prolonged debate about financing. The air station was largely funded by the North Atlantic Treaty Organization (NATO) and was opened on 4 May 1963, along with a civilian terminal. During the Cold War, Norway did not allow allies peacetime use of the airfield. The runway was extended in 1968 and the 330 Squadron was established in 1973.

== History ==
=== First airfield ===
The first proposals for an airport in Lakselv stemmed from military considerations. Despite a Norwegian policy of neutrality, there was a fear that Norway could be occupied by foreign powers to take advantage of the country's strategic position. The Norwegian military therefore wanted airfields constructed throughout the country to increase the air force's mobility. Finnmark was regarded as a key location, given the increased Soviet militarization on the Kola Peninsula. Increased military funding was granted from 1937, which allowed triangular runway to be built Banak the following year. It was used by a detachment of the Royal Norwegian Navy Air Service.

Banak was taken over by the Luftwaffe during the German occupation of Norway during World War II. The Wehrmacht was planning an attack on the Soviet Union from Finnmark and designated Banak as their primary air base in Northern Norway. By September 1940, the main runway was extended to 1,000 by 200 meters (3,280 by 660 ft), constructed in wood. Three hangars were built, allowing the air base to house bombers. The air station's prime function during the war was to facilitate attacks on the Arctic convoys. Expansion continued, and by 1943 there were two parallel runways, both 1,800 meters (5,900 ft) long. The air station was blasted in October 1944 during Operation Nordlicht, the German retreat from Finnmark.

In 1945 the Norwegian Air Force took control over the airfield and commenced reconstruction. That year, the air force operated a service from Bardufoss Air Station via Banak to Kirkenes Airport, Høybuktmoen, with correspondence to Oslo at Bardufoss. The service lasted only the one season. Later the runway was used to serve air ambulances. During the late 1940s, part of the wooden runway was removed and used for other construction projects.

Interest in Banak rose with the Czechoslovak coup d'état of 1948 and fears of Soviet intervention in Norway. Finnmark, located on the Norway–Soviet Union border, became of particular interest for the military. Although specific plans were articulated, no construction of an airbase was carried out. However, Norway's entry into the North Atlantic Treaty Organization (NATO) in 1949 had a dramatic effect on the military strategy and Banak. Finnmark was regarded as a tripwire and was to be sacrificed in case of a Soviet invasion. The airfield was closed in 1952, but the runway remained, consisting of a short section of unmaintained wooden runway and the rest a grass strip. It was occasionally used by small aircraft.

=== Plans for reestablishment ===
Interest from military leaders for an airport at Banak returned in 1955. The Air Force was mainly concerned that they could not reach the easternmost parts of Norway from Bodø Main Air Station. This allowed for several Soviet infringements of Norwegian air space. Alternative locations were considered, such as Kautokeino, where a radar had been built. NATO supported a reconstruction of Banak, partially raised by increased focus towards NATO's northern flank, and also to serve as part of the nuclear program. NATO was ready to provide funding in 1957, but by then Norwegian authorities were wanting to delay its construction. They cited lack of personnel to man the station as well as a lack of usability in times of war. The government decided in 1957 to disallow nuclear warheads to be stored in Norway during peacetime, thus eliminating NATO's strategic need for Banak. The air station was therefore removed from the investment program.

By 1959 the United States was concerned that the militarization of the Kola Peninsula would become the prime source of a Soviet attack on North America. A new discussion about location arose, with Alta and Kautokeino as the main alternatives. Banak was estimated to cost NOK 4.9 million, NOK 2.8 million less than Alta, had better instrument landing and weather conditions and allowed a longer runway. The main advantage of Alta was that it would be better suited for civilian traffic. The government and Parliament approved construction of Banak in 1959 on condition that it receive NATO funding.

By then new concerns had been raised by NATO regarding the defense of Banak, caused by its proximity to the Soviet Union, lack of military forces in Finnmark and lack of natural obstacles. The initial response from the Norwegian Air Force was that the airfield could easily be used by the Soviet Union in its current shape and that a means of destruction could make it useless following a Norwegian retreat. Later costs estimates rose to NOK 8.9 million, which would include a 2,000-meter (6,600 ft) runway, a 400-meter (1,300 ft) taxiway and a 1,000 square meters (11,000 sq ft) apron. Lack of funding meant the airport would not meet all of NATO's air base standards. This would be permitted because the airfield, from NATO's point of view, would only be used for emergency landings.

NATO's proposal for an investment program was approved by the Norwegian Government on 7 December 1959 and by the North Atlantic Council on 1 June 1960. Parliament passed the plans on 5 August. Construction was carried out simultaneously at Banak, Alta Airport and Kirkenes Airport, Høybuktmoen, which would combined give Finnmark three primary airports. All three airports opened on 4 May 1963.

=== Cold War ===
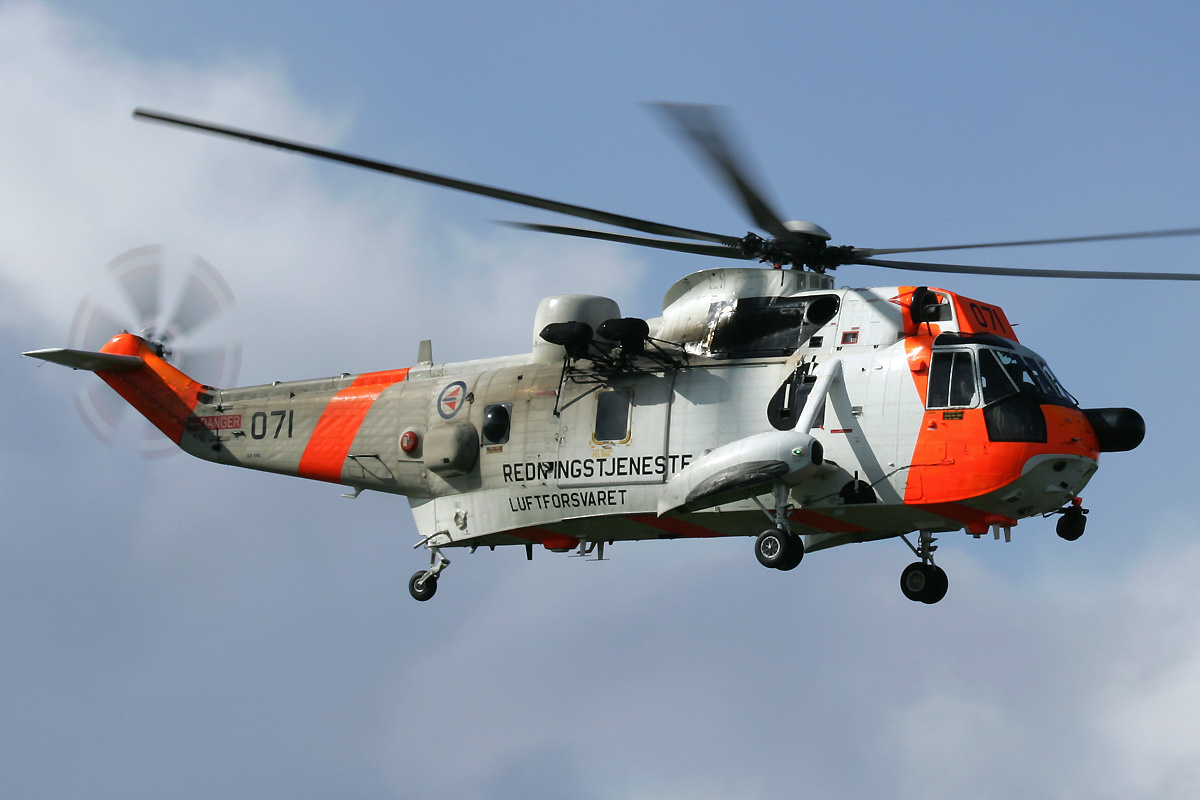
The Westland Sea King has been based at Banak since 1973

The dwindling credibility of the massive retaliation strategy caused NATO to shift to the flexible response strategy. This increased the importance of Banak, as it would be used to fly in reinforcements in a war situation. In 1962, both RNoAF and NATO proposed that Banak be expanded to full NATO standards. RNoAF planned that Banak should host a detachment of up to six fighters or fighter-bombers and act as a stopover for fighters, transports and helicopters. The airfield was to stockpile supplies, including fuel and ammunition, for one month of war efforts. NATO saw need, in case of a Soviet attack on Finnmark, to deploy two brigades consisting of 10,000 men in the course of a week and simultaneously host a squadron of tactical aircraft.

The expansion was estimated to cost NOK 17.8 million, of which NATO would fund 15.6 million, and approved by Parliament on 7 May 1965. NATO adjusted the plans later that year, reducing the apron area by 9,000 square meters (97,000 sq ft) while increasing from one to two hangars. Construction lasted from 1967 to 1968. It consisted of extending the runway with 600 meters (2,000 ft), constructing two hangars, a communications building and a network of internal roads and taxiways. The upgrades were followed up by pressure from the armed forces to establish a squadron of fighters at Banak. Following the Warsaw Pact invasion of Czechoslovakia in August–September 1968, the ministry decided to upgrade the Garrison of Porsanger from 400 to 1000 men. This was followed up with an extension of the runway and better air defense at Banak.

Throughout the Cold War, Norway enforced a policy to disallow allied aircraft to operate further north than Bardufoss and Andøya, in an effort to minimize tension with the Soviet Union. Specifically, allied aircraft were not permitted to operate east of the 24th meridian east, which was just west of Banak, thus hindering use of the airfield. This was motivated in part to not unnecessarily provoke the Soviet Union, with which Norway shared a land border, and in part because increased allied military presence could decrease the popular support for NATO membership. The restrictions were strengthened following the 1960 U-2 incident, in which a US spy aircraft en route to Bodø was shot down over Soviet territory. During the mid-1960s, NATO unsuccessfully attempted to convince Norwegian authorities to move the allied operational border from the 24th to the 27th meridian east.

Norway prohibited nuclear warheads to be stored on its soil, preventing Banak from serving in a role as a base for US nuclear-armed bombers. NATO's military interest for Banak peaked during the late 1960s. Increased range of Soviet aircraft during the 1970s diminished the need for troops in Finnmark; combined with Norwegian tension and nuclear policies, this caused the United States to favor Vestfjorden and Troms over Banak as the primary areas of defense.

Since 1970, the 332 Squadron and later the 334 Squadron and 336 Squadron have operated regular training missions out of Banak with fighter aircraft. In 1969 Parliament decided to establish a search and rescue squadron. Ten Sea King helicopters were bought by the Ministry of Justice in December 1970 and the 330 Squadron was re-enacted on 25 May 1973. Banak was one of four original stations for the helicopters, the others being Bodø, Ørland and Sola. The first major mission was on 7 April 1974, when thirteen fishermen were rescued when the trawler Longvabakk sank in the Oksefjorden at Cape Nordkinn.

=== Later history ===
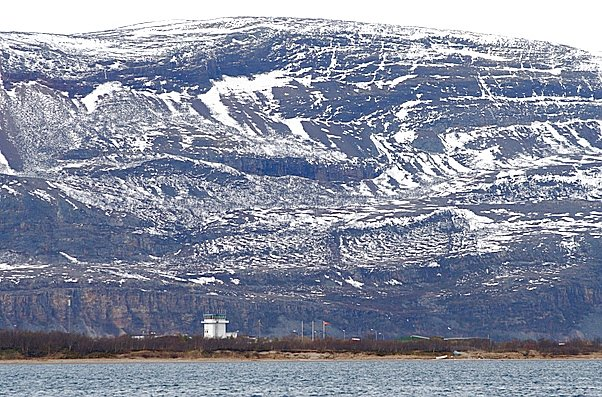
The control tower with Stabbursdalen in the background

The responsibility for Banak's Sea Kings originally included Svalbard. After a 1992 sinking, the government decided to instead lease a Super Puma helicopter for Svalbard, removing the archipelago from Banak's portfolio. Banak's runway was extended in 1992 and 1993, including widening to 45 meters (148 ft) and receiving new runway lighting. The range of the Sea Kings is in part determined by their radio range. Until 1998, some long-range missions with Sea Kings were flown with assistance of P-3 Orion aircraft to serve as radio relays, at one point allowing for a record 3,148 kilometers (1,956 mi) mission. The air station was in 1998 converted to a station group under Bodø Main Air Station.

In 2001, the Ministry of Justice considered reorganizing the search and rescue services, and looked into moving the 330 Squadron from Banak to Hammerfest Airport. The rationale was the proximity to Hammerfest Hospital and a typical 40-minute shorter flight time to the coast. However, such a location would give longer travel time to the inner parts of Finnmark. The plans were hindered by opposition from the Air Force, as they would have to establish a military station at Hammerfest. The Norwegian Armed Forces announced in 2007 that they would carry out a major restructuring and decrease of activity in Finnmark, with the long-term plan to close the Garrison of Porsanger.

== Facilities ==
Station Group Banak is located on the Banak peninsula, which sticks into Porsangerfjorden, just north of Lakselv. It is the northernmost station of the RNoAF. The military facilities are located on the western side of the runway, while the civilian facilities are on the eastern side. The runway is 2,788 by 45 meters (9,147 by 148 ft) and aligned 17–35 (roughly north–south). It is mostly asphalt, although parts are concrete. There is instrument landing system category I in both directions. The airfield saw 10,953 aircraft movements in 2011, including civilian.

== Operations ==
The 330 Squadron has a detachment with two Westland Sea King Mk 43B helicopters at Banak. They are part of the Norwegian Air Ambulance service, organized by the four regional health authorities. Medical personnel is provided by Finnmark Hospital Trust, while the remaining personnel are military. The detachment flew 271 missions and 854 hours in 2009. The Sea Kings' primary role is for search and rescue (SAR) mission, with a portfolio of northern Troms, Finnmark and the Barents Sea. In SAR missions, the squadron operates under the management of the Joint Rescue Coordination Centre of Northern Norway located in Bodø. The detachment's secondary responsibility is as an air ambulance, under management of Hammerfest Hospital.

During winter the helicopters must often follow a coastal flight route of Porsangerfjorden before heading east to Kirkenes or west to Tromsø, to avoid icing. The Sea Kings have an operational radius of 740 kilometers (460 mi); in combination with refueling possibilities at Bjørnøya and Hopen, this allows all parts of the Norwegian exclusive economic zone to be covered. Because of issues with icing, the helicopters cannot fly higher than 200 meters (660 ft) altitude.

The General Dynamics F-16 Fighting Falcons based at Bodø regularly use Banak both for monitoring and training. Fighter aircraft can reach the Norway–Russia border in about ten minutes, while helicopters can reach the border in thirty minutes. The primary use for fighters is training at the Halkkavarre Shooting Range.

== Civilian sector ==
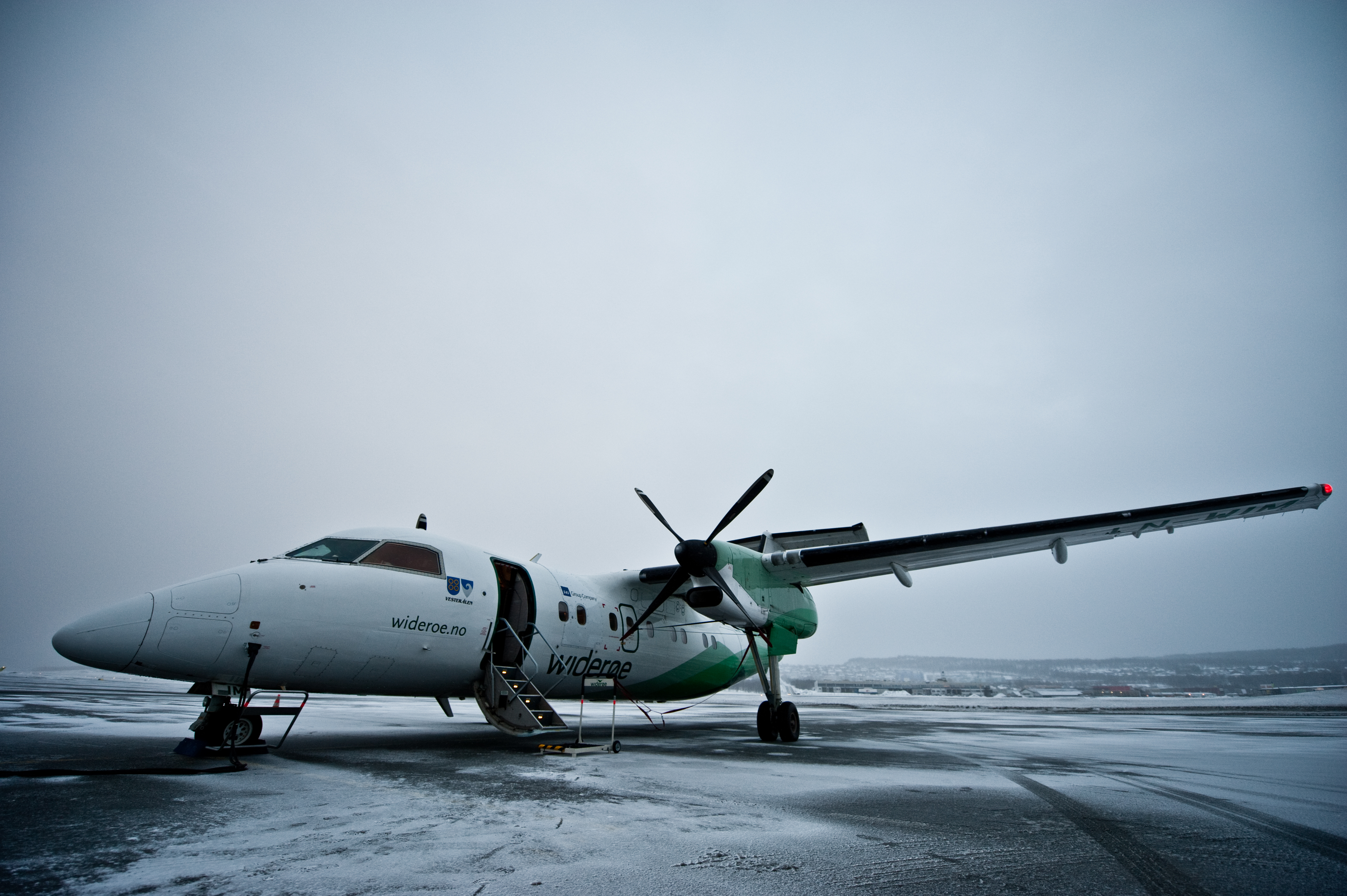
Widerøe Dash 8-100 at Lakselv Airport

Lakselv Airport, Banak is the main airport serving central Finnmark, with its catchment areas including the municipalities of Porsanger, Karasjok and Lebesby. Widerøe is the primary airline operating at the airport, with daily flights to Alta and Tromsø using Bombardier Dash 8 aircraft. In 2011, the airport had 63,537 passengers. It is classified as an international airport.

== Accidents and incidents ==
- On 12 June 1985, an F-16B with two people on board experienced control problems north of Banak. The pilot ejected and survived while an officer was killed.
- On 23 March 1992, an F-16A lost power at 5,500 meters altitude (18,000 ft). The pilot survived after aiming the aircraft at an unpopulated area and ejecting at an altitude of 1,400 meters (4,600 feet).
- On 29 June 2005, an ICP Savannah micro aircraft crashed only a few minutes after its departure from Banak, with two flight instructors on board. Both instructors were killed in the accident.
