= Qadirpur Ran =

- Town
- Qadirpur Ran
- Nickname: Ranwan
- Location in Pakistan
- Coordinates: 30°17′30″N 71°40′0″E
- Country: Pakistan
- Region: Punjab
- District: Multan District

Government
  - Type: Town Committee

Area
  - Metro: 25 km^{2} (9.7 sq mi)

Population (2016)
  - Town: 200,000
- Time zone: UTC+5 (PST)
- Postal code: 59000
- Area code: 061

Qadirpur Ran (Urdu: قادِرپُور راں) is a town in the Multan District of Punjab, Pakistan. The town has fourteen wards and three Union Councils: Qadirpur Ran City, Sharqi and Gharbi.

The most commonly spoken language here is Saraiki. While the Raan caste is dominant, other communities such as Ansari, Gazar, Thaheem, Khichi, Khral and Awan also reside there.

Qadirpur Ran is located on the Lahore–Multan Highway in a fertile agricultural area known for its mangoes and citrus (oranges), which are among its main crops and are exported outside the region. A canal called the Sindhai Canal passes through or near the town, aiding irrigation. The main roads in the town include Tatypur Road, Riazabad Road, Mattital Road, Khanewal–Multan Road and Hospital Road.

The name Qadirpur Ran originates from the Raan tribe (or caste). According to local lore, during the British colonial period, a British officer was impressed by the strength and presence of the Raan clan in the area and ordered that the land be recognized as theirs up to the limits of their grazing. Over time, the area became known as Ran (Raan) and the Raan family’s influence solidified. Even today, many of the leading landowners, politicians, and social figures belong to branches of the Raan family.

Politically, the town is split into two major groups: Mazhar Raan Group and Muhammad Hassan Raan Group. The Mazhar Raan group currently holds the MPA seat through Malik Wasif Mazhar Raan, who is recognized as a prominent leader of his group and the area.

Among past notable personalities is Malik Mazhar Abbas Raan (1953–2019), who served multiple terms as a Member of the Provincial Assembly of Punjab. His funeral was held in Qadirpur Ran, attended by many dignitaries.

Education is a growing priority in Qadirpur Ran. The following institutions are known to exist there:

Government Graduate College Qadirpur Ran (a public college)

The Educators Qadir Pur Ranwan Campus (private campus)

Educator Laureate is also mentioned locally as an educational institution (though detailed official records are harder to find)

Government Associate College (Boys / Co-education) is reported to exist, with co-education being introduced in some parts

Besides formal schools and colleges, many private coaching centers and tuition academies operate in the town. Locals also report that several of the youth have gone on to become engineers, doctors, and government employees. According to local sources, the literacy rate in Qadirpur Ran is estimated to be around 65%.

The town also produces professionals in various fields. For example, doctors such as Dr. Javeed, Dr. Shabir, Dr. Ramzan, Dr. Majeed, Dr. Zafar Bhukari and Dr. Zaheer are among well-known medical practitioners in the area. In education, many science teachers from the Government Higher Secondary School Qadirpur Ran.

Cricket is the most popular sport in the town, followed by football and tennis.

Economically, the town is growing quickly: many medical stores, pharmacies, banks and commercial companies have opened. A large bazaar acts as its main marketplace. The town also has all the infrastructure expected of a Tehsil, including offices such as NADRA, Passport Office, Rescue 1122, and the Land Record / Arazi Center. The housing society Rahat Garden City Qadirpur Ran is a modern residential development, and the DHA Fatima Jinnah Gate lies adjacent to the town, further increasing its importance.

== Education ==
Qadirpur Ran has primary and secondary educational institutions. Virtual University of Pakistan is accessible online.

=== Colleges and Universities ===
The higher education institutions are Government Boys Degree College Qadirpur Raan, Government Girls Degree College Qadirpur Raan, The NFC Institute of Engineering and Technology, and Bahauddin Zakariya University (formerly Multan University) located in Multan.

=== Elementary and Secondary Schools ===
- Quaid e azam public school, Qadirpur Raan Campus
- Allama Iqbal Public School
- Al-Ilm Public School
- Saadat Public School, Boys Branch
- The Perfect Educators School
- Government boys Higher Secondary School
- Government Girls Higher secondary School
- Allied School, Qadirpur Raan Campus
- Madni Qadri School
- The Educators School
- Dar e Arqam School
- Paradise Education School
- Usman Ghani Public School
- Government Girls Primary School Dheely Wala
- Government Girls Primary School Bahoo Wala
- Government primary school Qadir pur ran no.1. The biggest school in punjab (strength & quality of education)
