= Banac =

Banac is a surname. Notable people with the surname include:

- Grozdana Banac (born 1951), Serbian politician
- Ivo Banac (1947–2020), Croatian-American historian

== See also ==
- Banach
- Banak (disambiguation)
