= Marici =

Marici may refer to:

- Marici (Ligures), a Ligurian people of Gallia Transpadana
- Marici (Buddhism), Buddhist deity
- Marichi, masculine Sanskrit term for one of the Saptarshis
- Marići, Sveta Nedelja, a village in Istria, Croatia
- Marići, Kanfanar, a village in Istria, Croatia

== See also ==
- Marich (disambiguation)
