= Sarras, Iran =

Village in Kerman province, Iran

Sarras Persian: سرراس
- Village
- Location within Iran
- Coordinates: 27°29′19″N 57°31′08″E
- Country: Iran
- Province: Kerman
- County: Manujan
- District: Central
- Rural District: Qaleh

Population (2016)
  - Total: 2,350
- Time zone: UTC+3:30 (IRST)

Sarras (Persian: سرراس) (Note: Also romanized as Sar Rā's, Sārās, and Sarrās) is a village in Qaleh Rural District of the Central District of Manujan County, Kerman province, Iran.

== Demographics ==
=== Population ===
At the time of the 2006 National Census, the village's population was 1,883 in 389 households, when it was in Deh Kahan Rural District of Aseminun District. The following census in 2011 counted 2,186 people in 549 households, by which time the village had been transferred to Qaleh Rural District in the Central District. The 2016 census measured the population of the village as 2,350 people in 649 households. It was the most populous village in its rural district.
