= Banak, Norway =

Peninsula in Finnmark, Norway

Coordinates: 70.067°N 24.966°E

Banak is a small peninsula in Porsanger Municipality in Finnmark county, Norway. It juts into the Vestbotn bay of the vast Porsangerfjorden. Located immediately north of the village of Lakselv, the peninsula has Brennelvfjorden to its east and the river Lakselva to the east. Banak is the site of Lakselv Airport, Banak and Banak Air Station.

A temperature of 32 °C (90 °F) was recorded in Banak on 30 July 2018, considered very unusual for a location in the Arctic Circle, as part of the 2018 European heat wave. On 29 June 2022, as part of the June 2022 European heat wave, a temperature of 32.5 °C (90.5 °F) was recorded, reported as the highest temperature ever recorded in the Arctic circle. However, both Verkhoyansk and Fort Yukon, Alaska have recorded higher temperatures of 38.0 °C (100.4 °F) and 37.8 °C (100.0 °F) respectively.
