= Stabburselva =

River in Finnmark, Norway

Stabburselva Rávttošjohka (Northern Sami) Rautusjoki (Kven)
- Interactive map of the river

Location
- Country: Norway
- County: Finnmark
- Municipality: Porsanger

Physical characteristics
- Source: Nordre Stabbursdalsvannet
  - location: Porsanger, Finnmark, Norway
  - coordinates: 69°51′35″N 24°14′26″E
  - elevation: 368 m (1,207 ft)
- Mouth: Stabbursnes
  - location: Porsanger Municipality, Finnmark, Norway
  - coordinates: 70°11′07″N 24°55′34″E
  - elevation: 0 m (0 ft)
- Length: 60 km (37 mi)
- Basin size: 1,112 km^{2} (429 sq mi)

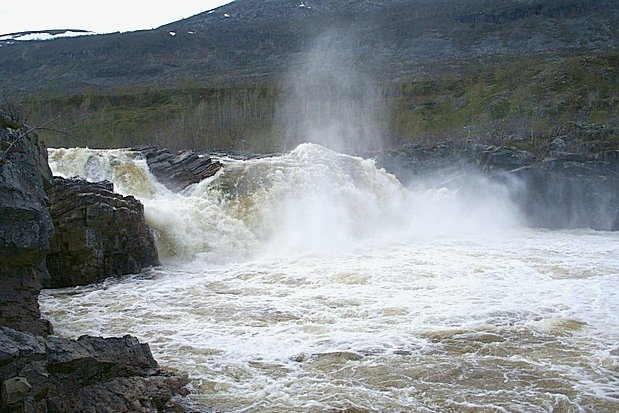

Stabburselva (Kven: Rautusjoki; Northern Sami: Rávttošjohka) is a river in Porsanger Municipality in Finnmark county, Norway. The 60-kilometre (37 mi) long river runs through the Stabbursdalen valley which is in the Stabbursdalen National Park which contains the world's most northerly pine forest. The river empties into the Porsangerfjorden about 15 kilometres (9.3 mi) north of Lakselv, along the European route E06 highway.

The Stabburselva river has the reputation of being a good salmon fishing river, along with the nearby rivers Lakselva and Børselva.
