= Manujan =

City in Kerman province, Iran

Manujan Persian: منوجان
- City
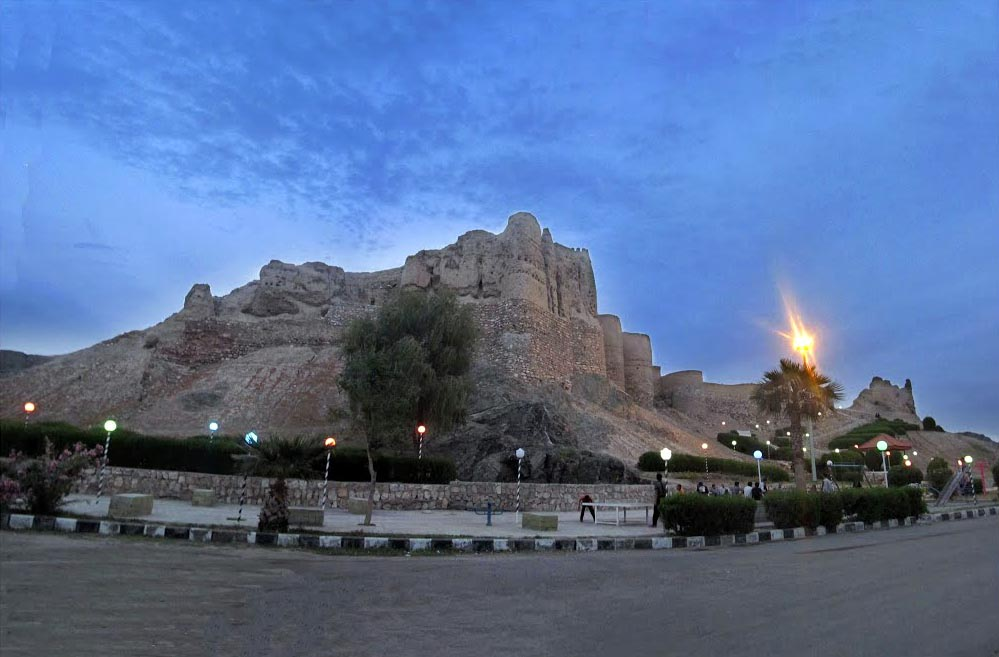
- Manujan Castle, an example of Sasanian architecture

- Location within Iran
- Coordinates: 27°24′11″N 57°29′30″E
- Country: Iran
- Province: Kerman
- County: Manujan
- District: Central

Population (2016)
  - Total: 15,634
- Time zone: UTC+3:30 (IRST)

Manujan (Persian: منوجان) (Note: Also romanized as Manūjān; also known as Qal‘eh-ye Manūjān (Fort Manujan); formerly Posht Qalāt) is a city in the Central District of Manujan County, Kerman province, Iran, serving as capital of both the county and the district. It is also the administrative center for Qaleh Rural District. The village of Manujan was elevated to the status of a city in 1996.

== Demographics ==
=== Population ===
At the time of the 2006 National Census, the city's population was 12,110 in 2,501 households. The following census in 2011 counted 14,286 people in 3,471 households. The 2016 census measured the population of the city as 15,634 people in 4,314 households.
