= Brennelvfjorden =

Fjord in Finnmark, Norway

Brennelvfjorden (Norwegian); Lavttevuotna (Northern Sami); Lohtivuono (Kven)
- Interactive map of the fjord
- Location: Finnmark county, Norway
- Coordinates: 70.06774°N 25.01064°E
- Type: Fjord
- Basin countries: Norway
- Max. length: 4 kilometres (2.5 mi)
- Max. depth: 24 metres (79 ft)

Brennelvfjorden (Norwegian) or Lavttevuotna (Northern Sami) or Lohtivuono (Kven) is a fjord in the most innermost section of Vesterbotn and Porsangerfjorden in Porsanger Municipality in Finnmark county, Norway. The fjord reaches 4 kilometres (2.5 mi) south to Lakselv. Situated on the western side of Oldereidneset, the fjord is bordered by Langneset to the north and Banakneset to the south, near Banak Airport. On the eastern side of the fjord lies the small settlement of Skogende. Its name is derived from Brennelva (also known as Palojoki in Kven), a river that flows into the innermost part of the fjord. The municipal center of Lakselv is located southwest of Fjordbotnen. The maximum depth of the fjord is 24 metres (79 ft) and it features shallow areas along the shore.

County Road 98 follows the inner section of the fjord, while the European route E6 highway runs along its western side and County Road 98 runs along the eastern side.
