= Sekukan, Zarand =

Sekukan سكوكان
- Village
- Location within Iran
- Coordinates: 30°50′54″N 56°48′28″E
- Country: Iran
- Province: Kerman
- County: Zarand
- Bakhsh: Central
- Rural District: Hotkan

Population (2006)
  - Total: 96
- Time zone: UTC+3:30 (IRST)
  - Summer (DST): UTC+4:30 (IRDT)

Sekukan (Persian: سكوكان, also Romanized as Sekūkān) is a village in Hotkan Rural District, in the Central District of Zarand County, Kerman Province, Iran. At the 2006 census, its population was 96, in 24 families.
