= Sirsa, Raebareli =

Sirsa
- Village
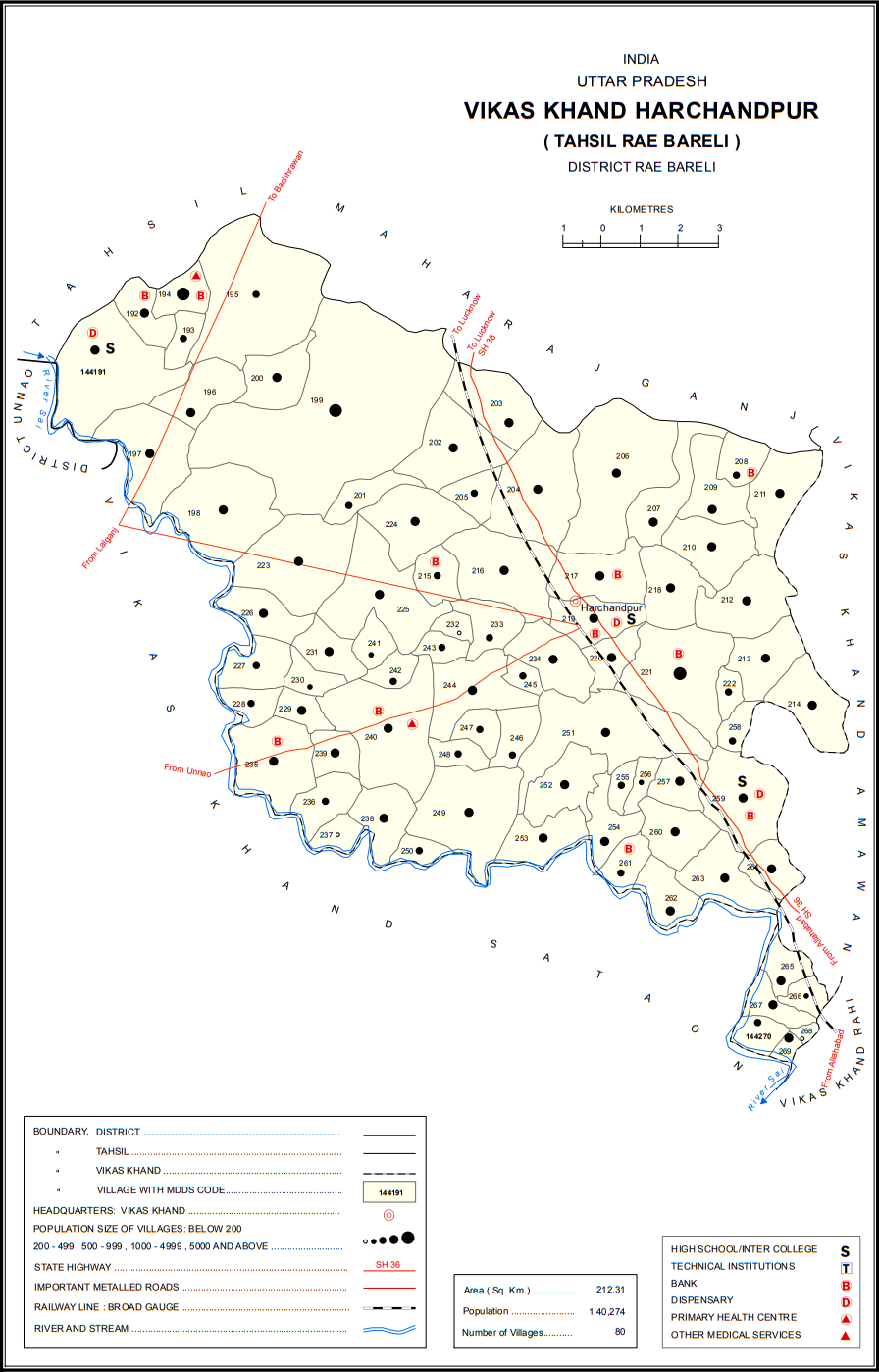
- Map showing Sirsa (#236) in Harchandpur CD block

- Location in Uttar Pradesh, India
- Coordinates: 26.293621°N 81.095613°E
- Country India: India
- State: Uttar Pradesh
- District: Raebareli

Area
  - Total: 3.64 km^{2} (1.41 sq mi)

Population (2011)
  - Total: 829
  - Density: 228/km^{2} (590/sq mi)

Languages
  - Official: Hindi
- Time zone: UTC+5:30 (IST)
- PIN: 229308
- Vehicle registration: UP-35

Sirsa is a village in Harchandpur block of Rae Bareli district, Uttar Pradesh, India. As of 2011, its population is 829, in 159 households. It has one primary school and no healthcare facilities.

The 1961 census recorded Sirsa (as "Sersa") as comprising 2 hamlets, with a total population of 279 people (157 male and 122 female), in 70 households and 69 physical houses. The area of the village was given as 412 acres.

The 1981 census recorded Sirsa as having a population of 565 people, in 106 households, and having an area of 174.83 hectares.
