= Ab Gol, Kohgiluyeh and Boyer-Ahmad =

Ab Gol ابگل
- Village
- Location within Iran
- Coordinates: 31°23′52″N 50°31′49″E
- Country: Iran
- Province: Kohgiluyeh and Boyer-Ahmad
- County: Boyer-Ahmad
- Bakhsh: Margown
- Rural District: Zilayi

Population (2006)
  - Total: 97
- Time zone: UTC+3:30 (IRST)
  - Summer (DST): UTC+4:30 (IRDT)

Ab Gol (Persian: ابگل, also Romanized as Āb Gol) is a village in Zilayi Rural District, Margown District, Boyer-Ahmad County, Kohgiluyeh and Boyer-Ahmad Province, Iran. At the 2006 census, its population was 97, in 17 families.
