= Dargaz, Bandar Abbas =

Dargaz درگز
- Village
- Location within Iran
- Coordinates: 27°49′44″N 56°17′29″E
- Country: Iran
- Province: Hormozgan
- County: Bandar Abbas
- Bakhsh: Fin
- Rural District: Siyahu

Population (2006)
  - Total: 876
- Time zone: UTC+3:30 (IRST)
  - Summer (DST): UTC+4:30 (IRDT)

Dargaz (Persian: درگز; also known as Darreh Gaz) is a village in Siyahu Rural District, Fin District, Bandar Abbas County, Hormozgan Province, Iran. At the 2006 census, its population was 876, in 227 families.
