= Sarasa, Altai Krai =

Sarasa Сараса
- Selo
- Location within Altai Krai Location within Russia
- Coordinates: 51°52′N 85°21′E
- Country: Russia
- Region: Altai Krai
- District: Altaysky District
- Time zone: UTC+7:00

Sarasa (Russian: Сараса) is a rural locality (a selo) and the administrative center of Proletarsky Selsoviet, Altaysky District, Altai Krai, Russia. The population was 1,023 as of 2013. There are 6 streets.

== Geography ==
Sarasa is located 11 km south of Altayskoye (the district's administrative centre) by road. Rudnik is the nearest rural locality.
