= Bazgir, Badakhshan =

Bazgir Bāzgīr Bāzgīrān
- Location in Afghanistan
- Coordinates: 36°38′24″N 71°27′46″E
- Country: Afghanistan
- Province: Badakhshan Province
- District: Ishkashim
- Elevation: 9,090 ft (2,770 m)
- Time zone: + 4.30

Bazgir is a village in Badakhshan Province in north-eastern Afghanistan. It is located on the western side of the Ishkashim Pass, roughly 5 miles from it on the western side of the valley.

It lies in a fertile area, and the inhabitants have been known to historically graze large numbers of cattle and donkeys there. There were roughly 40 houses there around 1900. When the area was under Badakhshi rule, there were no rents, with the residents instead paid with a tribute of hawks. The location derives its name from this fact.
