= Sarsa =

Sarsa may refer to:

Places

- Sarsa, Anand, a village in the Anand district of the Indian state of Gujarat
- Sarsa, Bhiwani, a village in the Bhiwani district of the Indian state of Haryana
- Sarsa, Kheda, a village in the Kheda district of the Indian state of Gujarat
- Sarsa, Bharuch, a village in the Bharuch district of the Indian state of Gujarat
- Sarsa, Kurukshetra, a village in the Kurukshetra district of the Indian state of Haryana
- Sarsa river (or Sirsa river), a river in north India
  - Battle of Sarsa (1704), during the Mughal–Sikh Wars

Food

- Sarsa, the Philippine Spanish term for sawsawan dipping sauces in Filipino cuisine
- Sarsa na uyang, a Philippine dish made with freshwater shrimp, coconut, and chilis

Others

- SARSA, State-Action-Reward-State-Action, a Markov decision process policy, used in the reinforcement learning area of machine learning
- Sarsa (singer), a Polish singer

== See also ==
- Sirsa (disambiguation)
