= Bazgard =

Bazgard بازگرد
- Village
- Location within Iran
- Coordinates: 26°21′13″N 57°10′36″E
- Country: Iran
- Province: Hormozgan
- County: Minab
- Bakhsh: Byaban
- Rural District: Byaban

Population (2006)
  - Total: 486
- Time zone: UTC+3:30 (IRST)
  - Summer (DST): UTC+4:30 (IRDT)

Bazgard (Persian: بازگرد, also Romanized as Bāzgard; also known as Bāzgar and Bāzgīr) is a village in Byaban Rural District, Byaban District, Minab County, Hormozgan Province, Iran. At the 2006 census, its population was 486, in 77 families.
