= Ab Damil, Hormozgan =

Ab Damil اب دميل
- Village
- Location within Iran
- Coordinates: 27°59′40″N 56°53′49″E
- Country: Iran
- Province: Hormozgan
- County: Hajjiabad
- Bakhsh: Ahmadi
- Rural District: Kuh Shah

Population (2006)
  - Total: 11
- Time zone: UTC+3:30 (IRST)
  - Summer (DST): UTC+4:30 (IRDT)

Ab Damil (Persian: اب دميل, also Romanized as Āb Damīl) is a village in Kuh Shah Rural District, Ahmadi District, Hajjiabad County, Hormozgan Province, Iran. At the 2006 census, its population was 11, in four families.
