= Abgol, Fars =

Abgol ابگل
- Village
- Location within Iran
- Coordinates: 28°53′01″N 52°53′06″E
- Country: Iran
- Province: Fars
- County: Firuzabad
- Bakhsh: Meymand
- Rural District: Par Zeytun

Population (2006)
  - Total: 1,579
- Time zone: UTC+3:30 (IRST)
  - Summer (DST): UTC+4:30 (IRDT)

Abgol (Persian: ابگل) is a village in Par Zeytun Rural District, Meymand District, Firuzabad County, Fars province, Iran. At the 2006 census, its population was 1,579, in 356 families.
