= Bazgir, Lorestan =

Bazgir بازگير
- Village
- Location within Iran
- Coordinates: 33°46′00″N 48°39′00″E
- Country: Iran
- Province: Lorestan
- County: Borujerd
- Bakhsh: Central
- Rural District: Hemmatabad

Population (2006)
  - Total: 31
- Time zone: UTC+3:30 (IRST)
  - Summer (DST): UTC+4:30 (IRDT)

Bazgir (Persian: بازگير, also Romanized as Bāzgīr) is a village in Hemmatabad Rural District, in the Central District of Borujerd County, Lorestan Province, Iran. At the 2006 census, its population was 31, in 7 families.
