= Naziabad, Rafsanjan =

Naziabad نازي اباد
- Village
- Location within Iran
- Coordinates: 30°17′44″N 56°30′52″E
- Country: Iran
- Province: Kerman
- County: Rafsanjan
- Bakhsh: Central
- Rural District: Kabutar Khan

Population (2006)
  - Total: 21
- Time zone: UTC+3:30 (IRST)
  - Summer (DST): UTC+4:30 (IRDT)

Naziabad (Persian: نازي اباد, also Romanized as Nāzīābād) is a village in Kabutar Khan Rural District, in the Central District of Rafsanjan County, Kerman Province, Iran. According to the 2006 census its population was 21, consisting of 4 families.
