= Banak Shöl Hotel =

Hotel in Lhasa, Tibet, China

Coordinates: 29°39′17″N 91°08′10″E

- 八朗学旅馆
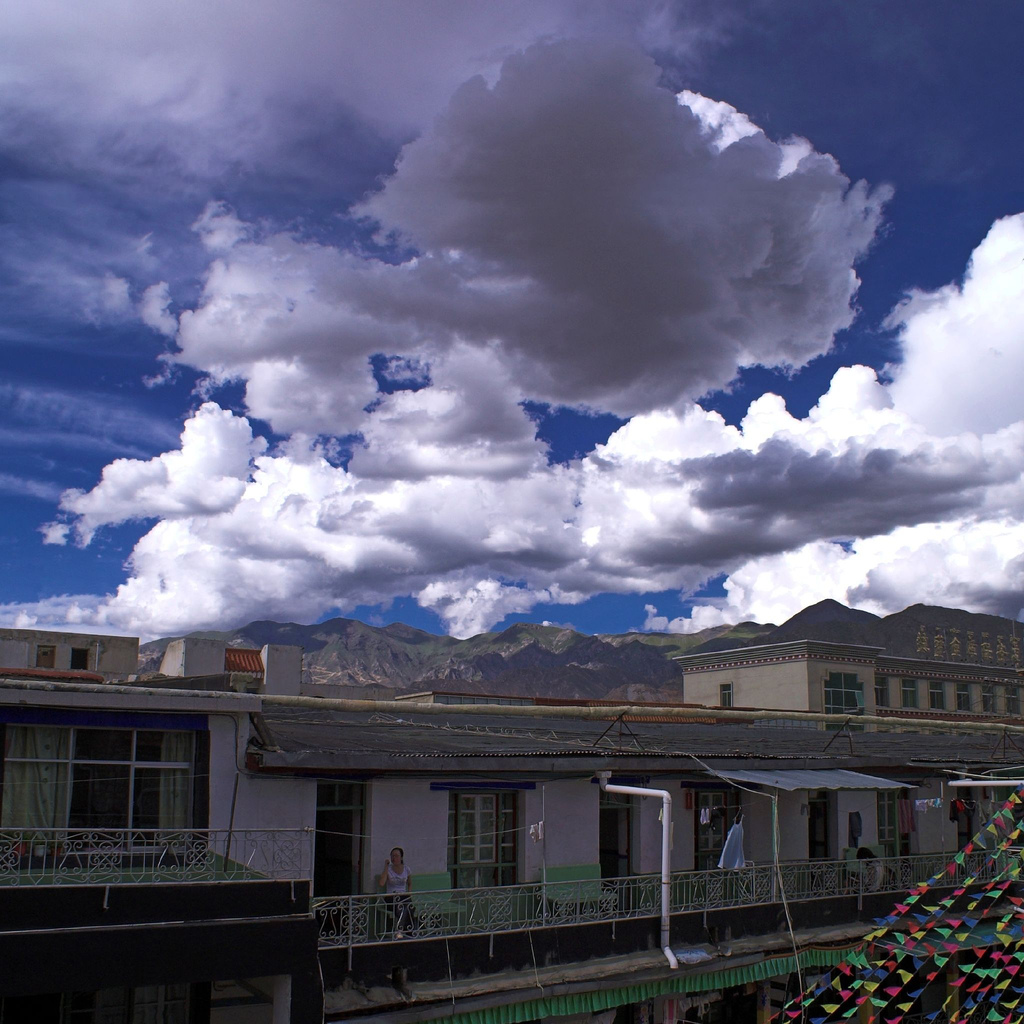
- Interactive map of the Banak Shöl Hotel area

General information
- Type: Hotel
- Location: Lhasa, Tibet, China

Banak Shöl Hotel (Chinese: 八朗学旅馆; pinyin: Bālǎng Xué Lǚguǎn) is a historic hotel in the city of Lhasa, Tibet, China. It is located at 8 Beijing Road. The hotel is known for its distinctive wooden verandas. The Nam-Tso Restaurant is located inside the hotel and is popular with tourists visiting Lhasa.
