= Dargaz, Hajjiabad =

Dargaz درگز
- Village
- Location within Iran
- Coordinates: 28°02′21″N 56°43′52″E
- Country: Iran
- Province: Hormozgan
- County: Hajjiabad
- Bakhsh: Ahmadi
- Rural District: Kuh Shah

Population (2006)
  - Total: 24
- Time zone: UTC+3:30 (IRST)
  - Summer (DST): UTC+4:30 (IRDT)

Dargaz (Persian: درگز; also known as Dargazū, and Dargezū) is a village in Kuh Shah Rural District, Ahmadi District, Hajjiabad County, Hormozgan Province, Iran. At the 2006 census, its population was 24, in 6 families.
