= Dargaz-e Palaki =

Dargaz-e Palaki درگازپلكي
- Village
- Location within Iran
- Coordinates: 26°51′52″N 57°46′48″E
- Country: Iran
- Province: Hormozgan
- County: Bashagard
- Bakhsh: Gowharan
- Rural District: Gowharan

Population (2006)
  - Total: 101
- Time zone: UTC+3:30 (IRST)
  - Summer (DST): UTC+4:30 (IRDT)

Dargaz-e Palaki (Persian: درگازپلكي, also Romanized as Dargāz-e Palakī; also known as Dargāz) is a village in Gowharan Rural District, Gowharan District, Bashagard County, Hormozgan Province, Iran. At the 2006 census, its population was 101, in 27 families.
