= László Szőgyény-Marich =

László Szőgyény-Marich is the name of:

- László Szőgyény-Marich, Sr., Hungarian Court Chancellor, Speaker of the House of Magnates
- László Szőgyény-Marich, Jr., Hungarian diplomat, ambassador, Minister besides the King
