= Bazgir-e Qaleh Parvar =

Bazgir-e Qaleh Parvar بازگيرقلعه پرور
- Village
- Location within Iran
- Coordinates: 34°31′43″N 45°52′01″E
- Country: Iran
- Province: Kermanshah
- County: Sarpol-e Zahab
- Bakhsh: Central
- Rural District: Howmeh-ye Sarpol

Population (2006)
  - Total: 408
- Time zone: UTC+3:30 (IRST)
  - Summer (DST): UTC+4:30 (IRDT)

Bazgir-e Qaleh Parvar (Persian: بازگيرقلعه پرور, also Romanized as Bāzgīr-e Qal‘eh Parvar; also known as Bāzgar, Bāzgīr, and Mojtame‘-e Maskūnī-ye Bāzgīr va Qal‘eh Parvar) is a village in Howmeh-ye Sarpol Rural District, in the Central District of Sarpol-e Zahab County, Kermanshah Province, Iran. At the 2006 census, its population was 408, in 95 families.
