= Lakselv Airport =

Airport in Banak, Norway

Lakselv Airport Lakselv lufthavn

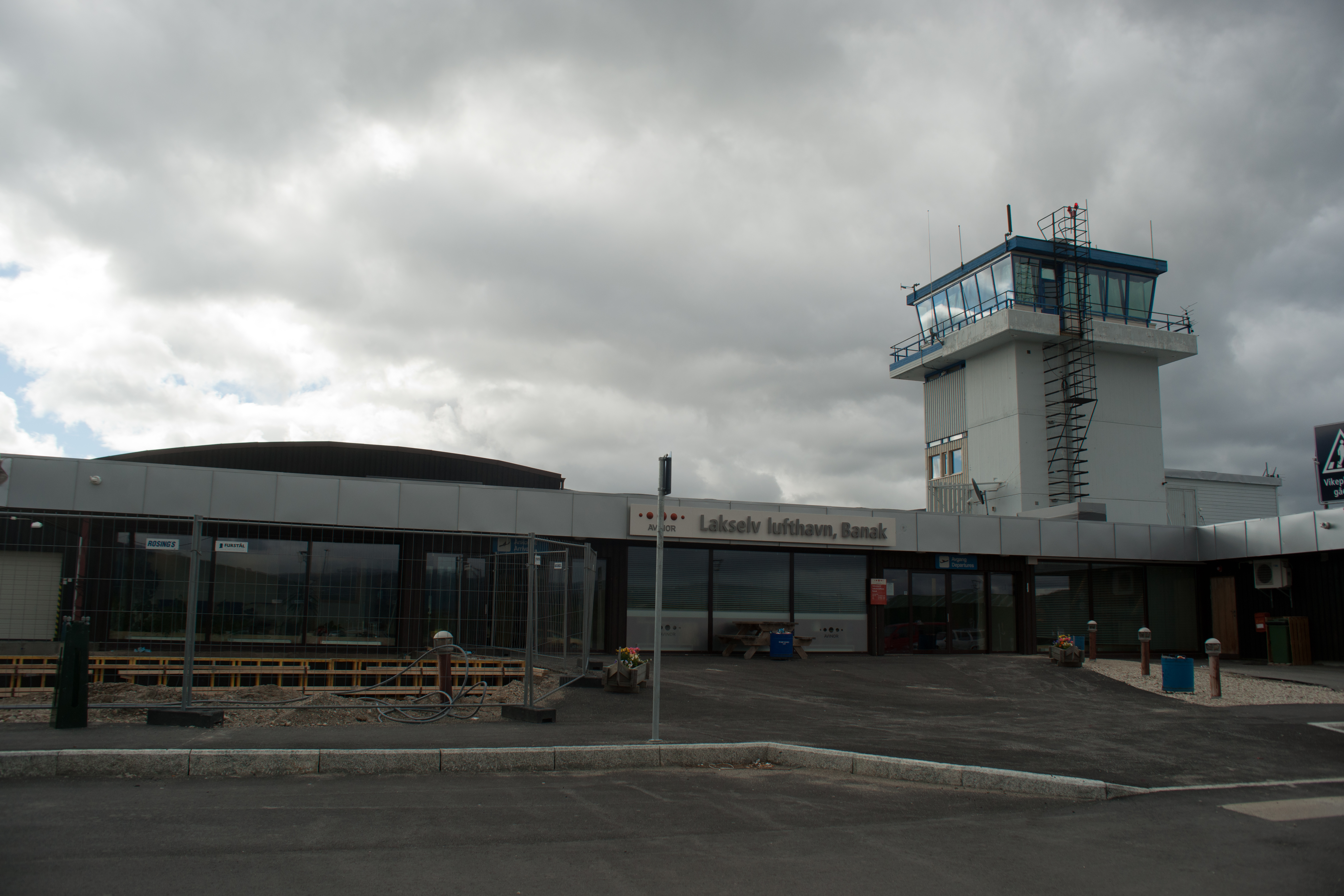
- IATA: LKL; ICAO: ENNA

Summary
- Airport type: Joint (Public and military)
- Operator: Avinor
- Serves: Lakselv, Norway
- Location: Banak, Porsanger, Finnmark
- Elevation AMSL: 8 m (26 ft)
- Coordinates: 70°04′00″N 024°58′26″E
- Website: Official website

Map
- Location in Norway

Runways
Direction	Length		Surface
Direction	m	ft	Surface
17–35	2,788	9,147	Asphalt/concrete

Statistics (2012)
- Passengers: 71,763
- Aircraft movements: 3,699
- Cargo (tonnes): 330

Lakselv Airport (Norwegian: Lakselv lufthavn; IATA: LKL, ICAO: ENNA) is an international airport located at Banak, 1.5 kilometers (1 mile) north of the village of Lakselv in Porsanger Municipality in Finnmark county, Norway. Co-located with the military Station Group Banak, the airport is owned and operated by the state-owned Avinor. The airport is also branded as North Cape Airport, although the North Cape is 190 km (120 mi) away, and the nearest airport is Honningsvåg Airport, Valan.

The runway is 2,788 meters (9,147 feet) long and aligned nearly north–south. The airport is served by Widerøe with daily direct flights to Tromsø and Kirkenes. Scandinavian Airlines offer weekly direct flights from Lakselv to Oslo, in addition to seasonal international charter services. The airport served 71,763 passengers in 2012. In addition to serving Porsanger, the airport's catchment area includes Karasjok Municipality, Måsøy Municipality, and Lebesby Municipality.

The airfield was constructed with triangular runways in 1938. During the German occupation of Norway in World War II, it was taken over by the Luftwaffe in 1940, who expanded it and laid down two wooden runways. In 1945, it was taken over by the NoRAF and then abandoned in 1952. It reopened in 1963 and was largely funded by the North Atlantic Treaty Organization (NATO). Scandinavian Airlines operated out of the airport to the other primary airports in Finnmark and to Tromsø and Oslo. The runway was extended in 1968. From 1990, flights were taken over by SAS Commuter and the direct flights to Oslo were halted. From the mid-1990s there have been occasional charter flights out of Banak. Widerøe took over SAS' services in 2002. In 2022 Danish Air Transport operates flights to and from Tromsø.

== History ==
=== First airport ===
Military considerations led to a proposed airport at Lakselv. Despite a Norwegian neutrality policy, there was fear that Norway could be occupied by foreign powers who wanted to take advantage of the country's strategic position. The military, therefore, wanted to construct airfields throughout the country to increase the air force's mobility. Especially Finnmark was regarded as a key location, given the increased Soviet militarization on the Kola Peninsula. Increased military funding was granted beginning in 1937 and the following year. The result was a triangular runway built at Banak.

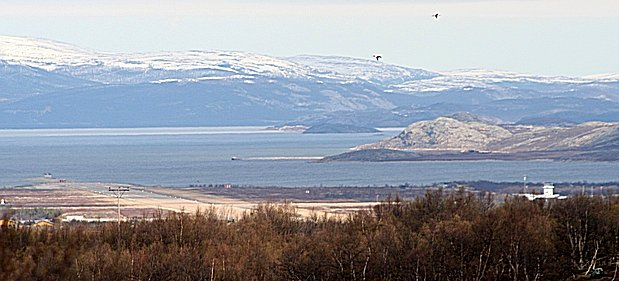
Overview of the runway

=== German Occupation ===
In May 1940, the airport was occupied by the Royal Air Force, before the Luftwaffe took over control. During the World War II German occupation of Norway, Banak was taken over by the Luftwaffe. They were planning an attack on the Soviet Union from Finnmark and decided to designate Banak as their main air base in Northern Norway. By September 1940, the main runway was extended to 1,000 by 200 m (3,280 by 660 ft) with a wooden surface. In addition, three hangars were built, allowing the air base to house bombers. The main function of the air station was to attack the Arctic convoys. By 1943 there were two parallel runways, both 1,800 m (5,900 ft) long. The air base mainly operated Torpedo bombing missions on allied convoys in and out from Russia.

The air station was blasted in October 1944 during Operation Nordlicht, the German retreat from Finnmark. The Royal Norwegian Air Force took control over the airfield in 1945 and started reconstruction. In 1945, the Air Force operated scheduled flights from Bardufoss Air Station via Banak to Kirkenes Airport, Høybuktmoen; at Bardufoss a corresponding flight was offered to Oslo. The service lasted only the one season. Later the runway was used to serve air ambulances. During the late 1940s, part of the wooden runway was removed and used for other construction projects.

Interest in Banak rose with the Czechoslovak coup d'état of 1948 and fears of Soviet intervention in Norway. Finnmark, located on the Norway–Soviet Union border, became of particular interest for the military. Although specific plans were articulated, no construction was carried out. Norway's entry into the North Atlantic Treaty Organization (NATO) in 1949 had a dramatic effect on military strategy and Banak. Norwegian authorities and NATO regarded Finnmark as a tripwire. It was to be sacrificed and used to delay attacking forces during a Soviet invasion. The airfield was closed in 1952, but the runway remained, with a short section of an unmaintained wooden runway and otherwise consisting of a grass strip. It was occasionally used by small aircraft.

=== Re-establishment ===
Interest from military leaders for an airport at Banak returned in 1955. For the air force the main concern was that they could not reach the easternmost parts of Norway from Bodø Main Air Station. This resulted in several Soviet infringements of Norwegian air space. Alternative locations were considered, such as Kautokeino Municipality, where a radar had been built. NATO supported a reconstruction of Banak, partially due to an increased focus on flanking maneuver strategies, and also to serve as a part of the nuclear program. NATO was ready to provide funding in 1957, but the Norwegian authorities wanted to delay its construction, citing lack of personnel to man the station and that it would not be usable in times of war. The government decided in 1957 to not allow nuclear warheads to be stored in Norway during peacetime, thus eliminating NATO's strategic need for Banak. The airport was therefore removed from the investment program.

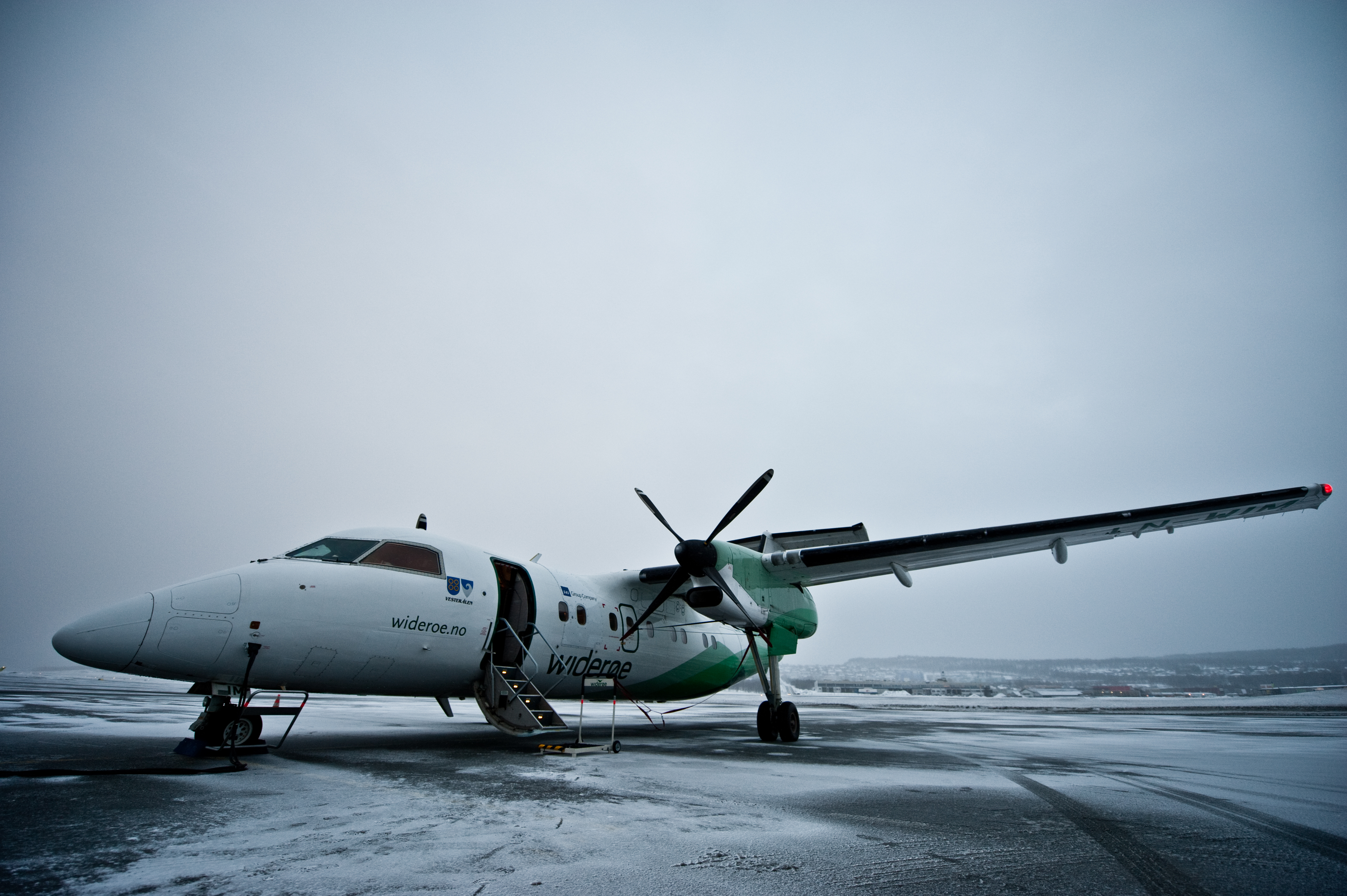
Widerøe de Havilland Canada Dash 8-100

By 1959 the United States was concerned that the militarization of the Kola Peninsula would become the prime point of a Soviet attack on North America. A new discussion about location arose, with Alta and Kautokeino as the main alternatives. Banak was estimated to cost 4.9 million Norwegian krone (NOK), NOK 2.8 million less than Alta; it had better instrument landing capabilities and weather conditions; it allowed for a longer runway. The main advantage of Alta was that it would be better suited for civilian traffic. The government and Parliament approved construction of Banak in 1959 on condition that it receive NATO funding. Construction was estimated at NOK 8.9 million, which would include a 2,000-meter (6,600 ft) runway, but lack of funding meant the airport would not meet all of NATO's air base standards. The project was approved by NATO on 1 June 1960 and by Parliament on 5 August.

Construction was carried out simultaneously at Banak, Alta Airport and Kirkenes Airport in Høybuktmoen, which combined would give Finnmark three primary airports. All three airports opened on 4 May 1963, while Tromsø Airport opened the following year. Services were at first operated by Scandinavian Airlines System (SAS). At first the airline used 56-passenger Convair CV-440 Metropolitan aircraft, which flew flights south to Oslo in combination with flights to Alta and Kirkenes—from 1964 also to Tromsø. The general route scheme of flying multi-legged flights from Oslo to Finnmark would remain until 1990.

=== Operational history ===
To allow increased military use of the air station, the airport received an upgrade in 1967 and 1968 costing NOK 17.8 million. This included a 600-meter (2,000 ft) extension of the runway, a taxiway and various military hangars and structures. Following the Warsaw Pact invasion of Czechoslovakia in 1968, Norway decided to further strengthen the Finnmark defenses, which among many measures included a further extension of the runway at Banak. From 7 April 1969, SAS introduced the 85-passenger Douglas DC-9-21 jetliner on the Finnmark service; the last Metropolitan flew on 1 April 1970. The 330 Squadron, which operates the Westland Sea King search and rescue helicopters, was established at Banak Air Station in 1973. SAS' traffic increased throughout the 1970s, resulting in SAS gradually increasing the frequency of its services, and later also using larger DC-9s. The McDonnell Douglas MD-80 was first flown on the Finnmark route on 11 July 1986.

SAS Commuter was established in 1988 and started operations in Northern Norway in May 1990, making Alta its central hub for Finnmark. Lakselv Airport had been proposed by among others Finnmark County Council as the hub, but SAS and other found Alta better suited. For Banak this meant that the Oslo services were terminated and smaller Fokker 50 aircraft were flown to Alta and Tromsø, and passengers could continue to Oslo with direct flights from there. The runway was extended in 1992 and 1993, including widening to 45 m (148 ft) and receiving new runway lighting. Lakselv Airport started using the brand "North Cape Airport" in 1996, in an attempt to increase tourist traffic to the airport. Honningsvåg Airport, Valan in Nordkapp Municipality was already using the name, but the latter had a short runway only suitable for regional aircraft, and Banak is the closest airport serving jetliners. The Civil Aviation Administration followed up by investing NOK 21 million, expanding the terminal to allow international passengers, and Stolt Seafarm started the export of fish via the airport. From 1997, LTU started charter services from Düsseldorf to Lakselv, and Condor operated flights from Barcelona. In June 2001, Finnair started a scheduled service from Lakselv via Rovaniemi to Helsinki three times a week. North Cape Golf Club, located immediately next to the airport, opened in 2001.

All SAS Commuter services in Northern Norway were taken over by Widerøe in October 2002. Norwegian Air Shuttle took over the routes to Alta and Tromsø from 1 April 2003, but already at the start of operations announced they would retire their fleet of Fokker 50 aircraft, resign from short-haul routes and become a low-cost airline. Widerøe won the subsequent tender and started operating to Lakselv from 1 January 2004. SAS Braathens introduced low-frequency summer services from Oslo beginning in 2006, which lasted for three seasons. SAS cited too low ridership from foreign tourists as the reason for the closure. Widerøe took over SAS Ground Services' operations at Banak in 2008. Norwegian introduced a new summer seasonal route from Oslo to Lakselv from 2011. Outgoing charter services started in 2012 to Burgas and Antalya. Scandinavian Airlines operated one charter flight from Tokyo and back in 2011.

== Facilities ==
Lakselv Airport is equipped with a café and a duty-free shop. The airport is staffed with customs and police during international flights. It is located three to five minutes from Lakselv and 74 kilometers (46 mi) by road to Karasjok. Taxis and an airport bus are available; there are 172 paid parking spaces. The runway is 2,788 by 45 m (9,147 by 148 ft) and aligned 17–35 (roughly north–south). It is mostly asphalt, although parts are concrete. There is a category I instrument landing system for both directions. In 2012, the airport had 71,763 passengers, 3,699 aircraft movements and 330 tonnes of cargo.

== Airlines and destinations ==
Danish Air Transport had been the main airline operating at Banak, with daily flights to Tromsø from 1 April 2012.

Airlines	Destinations
Norwegian Air Shuttle	Oslo
Widerøe	Tromsø

== Statistics ==
Annual passenger traffic
Year	Passengers	% Change
2025	74,377	▲5.9%
2024	70,264	▲16.7%
2023	60,227	▲1.0%
2022	59,646	▲9.9%
2021	54,287	▲19.7%
2020	45,348	▼ -22.8%
2019	58,763	▼ -1.4%
2018	59,604	▼ -2.3%
2017	60,979	▼ -0.4%
2016	61,208	▼ -6.7%
2015	65,624	

== Military ==
Station Group Banak, formerly Banak Air Station, comprises the airfield's military activity. It is organizationally part of Bodø Main Air Station. The 330 Squadron has a detachment at Banak, which is responsible for operating the Westland Sea King for search and rescue missions in the Barents Sea. The air station is regularly visited by the General Dynamics F-16 Fighting Falcon for use in the shooting range at Halkavarre. The Garrison of Porsanger is located close to Lakselv.

== Accidents and incidents ==
- On 12 June 1985 an F-16B with two people on board experienced control problems north of Banak. The pilot ejected and survived while an officer died.
- On 23 March 1992 an F-16A lost power at 5,500 meters altitude (18,000 ft). The pilot survived after aiming the aircraft at an unpopulated area and ejecting at an altitude of 1,400 meters (4,500 ft).
- On 29 June 2005 an ICP Savannah micro aircraft crashed only a few minutes after its departure from Banak, with two flight instructors on board. Both instructors were killed in the accident.
