= Lakselva =

River in Finnmark, Norway

Coordinates: 69.9904°N 24.9574°E

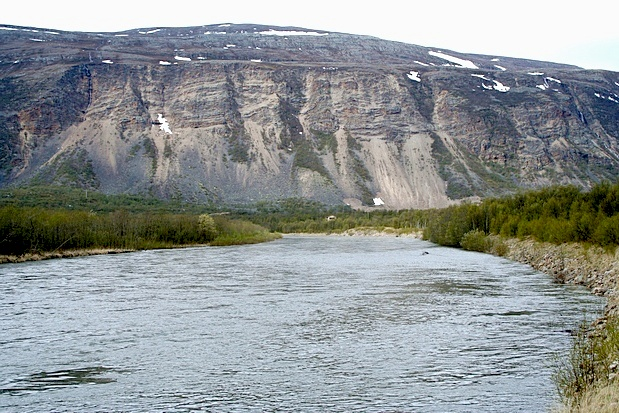
- View of the river
- Interactive map of the river
- Native name: Leavdnjajohka (Northern Sami); Lemmijoki (Kven)

Location
- Country: Norway

Physical characteristics
- Source
  - location: Finnmarksvidda
- Mouth
  - location: Lakselv
- Length: 103 km (64 mi)
- Basin size: 1,539 km^{2} (594 sq mi)
- Discharge
  - average: 26.93 m^{3}/s (951 cu ft/s)

Lakselva (Northern Sami: Leavdnjajohka; Kven: Lemmijoki) is a river in Finnmark county in northern Norway. It begins in Karasjok Municipality runs north through Porsanger Municipality into the Porsangerfjorden, a fjord off of the Barents Sea. The 103-kilometre (64 mi) long river runs past the village of Lakselv. The European route E06 highway runs along the river for much of its course. The river is famous for its Atlantic salmon fishing.
