= Nurabad Rural District (Manujan County) =

Rural district in Kerman province, Iran

Nurabad Rural District Persian: دهستان نورآباد
- Rural District
- Location within Iran
- Coordinates: 27°14′08″N 57°29′58″E
- Country: Iran
- Province: Kerman
- County: Manujan
- District: Central
- Capital: Chah-e Shahi

Population (2016)
  - Total: 2,878
- Time zone: UTC+3:30 (IRST)

Nurabad Rural District (Persian: دهستان نورآباد) is in the Central District of Manujan County, Kerman province, Iran. Its capital is the village of Chah-e Shahi. (Note: Also known as Nurabad)

== Demographics ==
=== Population ===
At the time of the 2006 National Census, the rural district's population was 2,508 in 642 households. There were 2,863 inhabitants in 739 households at the following census of 2011. The 2016 census measured the population of the rural district as 2,878 in 803 households. The most populous of its 24 villages was Tejdanu, with 1,110 people.
