= Lakselv =

Village in Porsanger, Norway

Lakselv Lakselv (Norwegian) Leavdnja (Northern Sami) Lemmijoki (Kven)
- Village
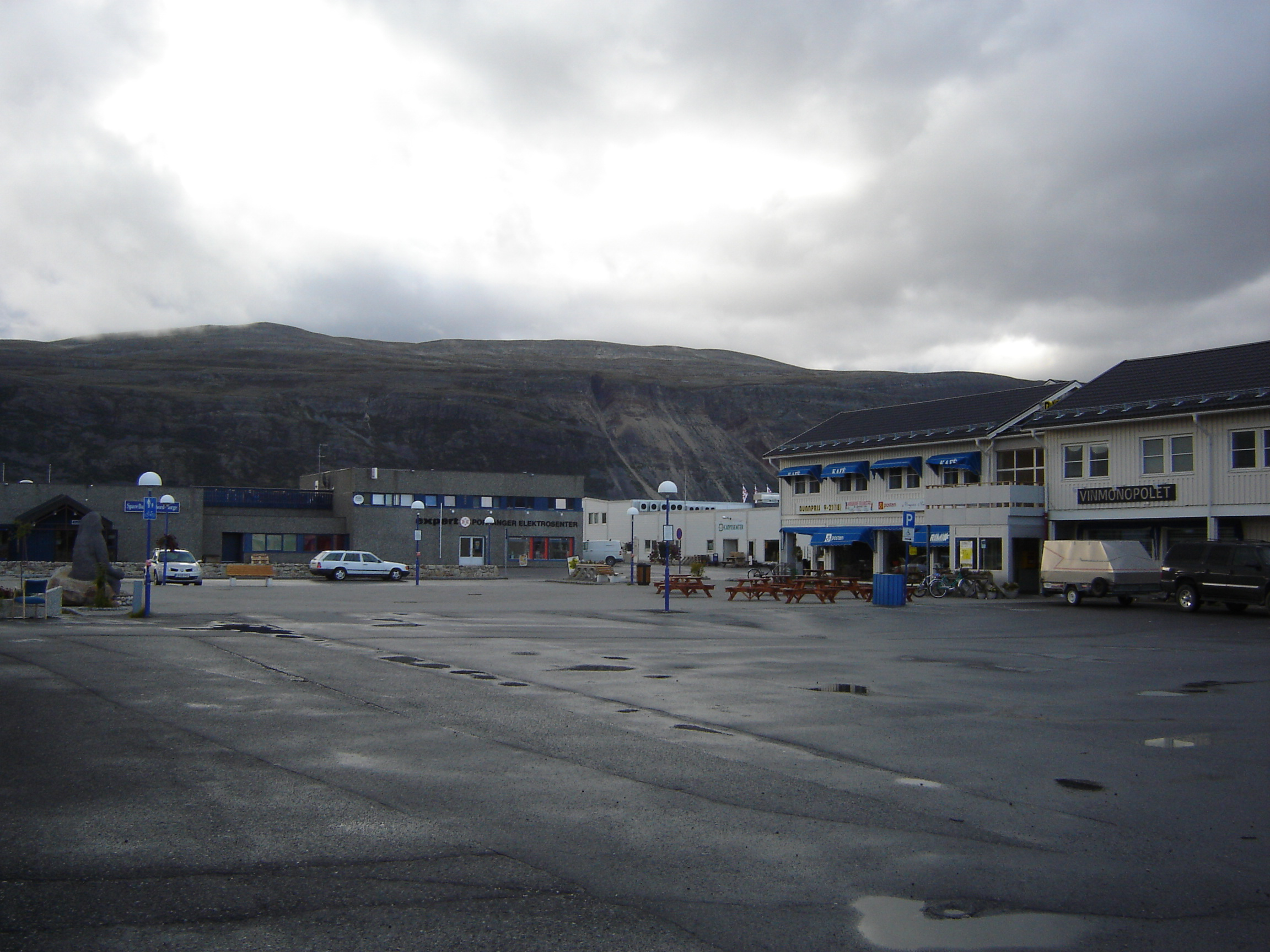
- View of the village
- Interactive map of Lakselv
- Location within Finnmark Location within Norway
- Coordinates: 70°03′04″N 24°58′18″E
- Country: Norway
- Region: Northern Norway
- County: Finnmark
- District: Vest-Finnmark
- Municipality: Porsanger

Area
  - Total: 2.36 km^{2} (0.91 sq mi)
- Elevation: 18 m (59 ft)

Population (2023)
  - Total: 2,224
  - Density: 942/km^{2} (2,440/sq mi)
- Time zone: UTC+01:00 (CET)
  - Summer (DST): UTC+02:00 (CEST)
- Post Code: 9700 Lakselv

Lakselv (Norwegian; lit. 'Salmon River'), Leavdnja (Northern Sami) or Lemmijoki (Kven) is the largest village and administrative centre of Porsanger Municipality in Finnmark county, Norway. The village lies at the southern end of the large Porsangerfjorden. The 2.36-square-kilometre (580-acre) village has a population (2023) of 2,224 which gives the village a population density of 942 inhabitants per square kilometre (2,440/sq mi).

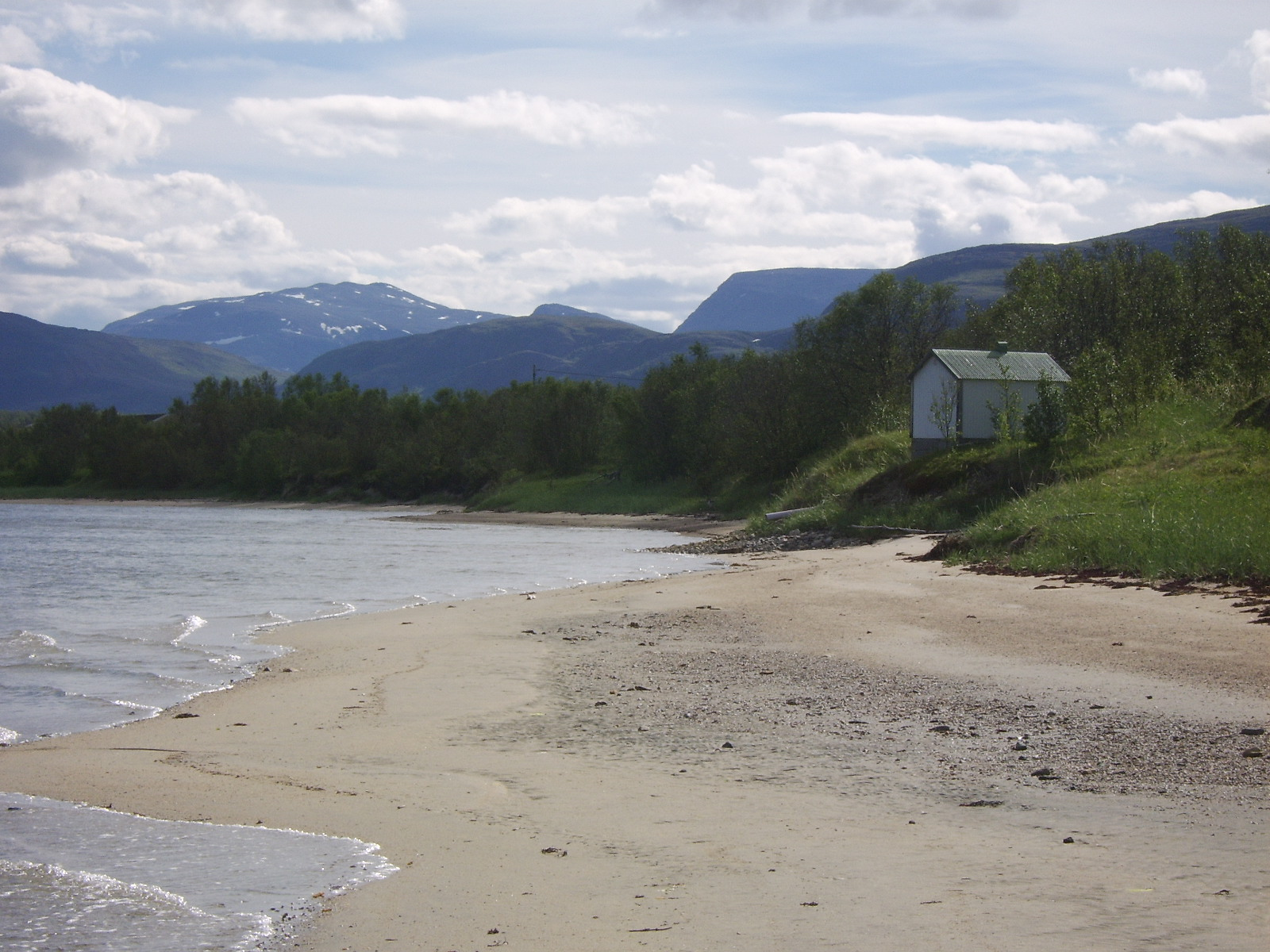
The fjord beach at Lakselv

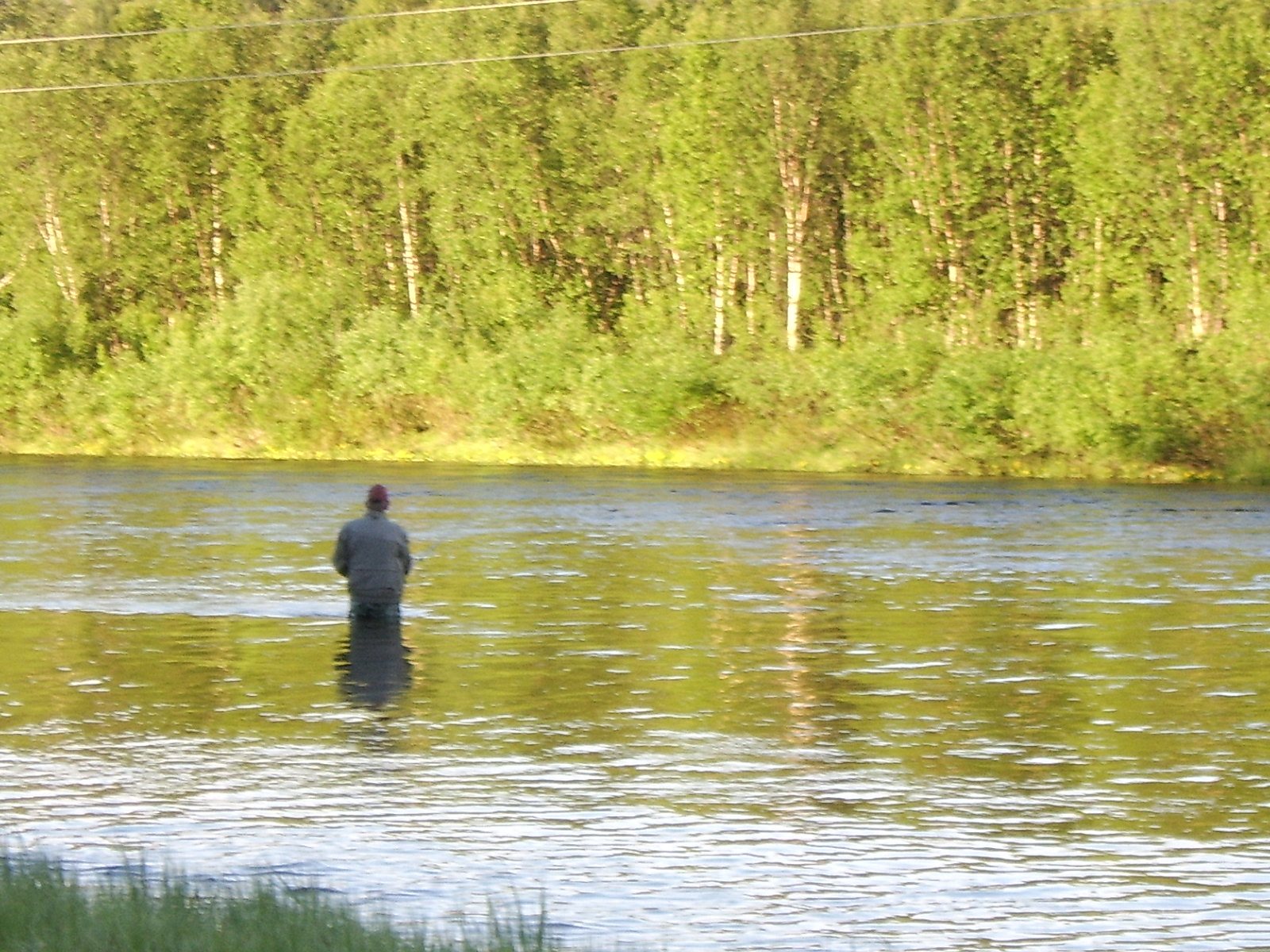
Fishing in the summer in Lakselv

There are a number of shops and supermarkets in Lakselv, as well as private and public sector services that cater for the village and its surrounding settlements. Lakselv Church is located in the central part of the village.

== Transportation ==
The European route E6 highway runs through the village. Lakselv Airport, Banak is located in Lakselv on the Banak peninsula. The airport has connections to Tromsø, Alta, and Kirkenes operated by Widerøe, as well as charter flights in the summer season.

== Activities ==
The area is popular for salmon, trout, Arctic char, and grayling fishing throughout the summer months in the Lakselva river which runs through the village. There are also great hiking opportunities in the surrounding arctic wilderness, including in Stabbursdalen National Park just west of the village.

During the winter, skiing, snowmobile safaris, ice fishing, and dog sledding are popular activities.

== Notable people ==
- Lars Iver Strand, a footballer who plays for Sandefjord Fotball is from Lakselv
