= Geshmiran Rural District =

Rural district in Kerman province, Iran

Geshmiran Rural District Persian: دهستان گشمیران
- Rural District
- Location within Iran
- Coordinates: 27°06′35″N 57°46′01″E
- Country: Iran
- Province: Kerman
- County: Manujan
- District: Central
- Capital: Geshmiran

Population (2016)
  - Total: 1,584
- Time zone: UTC+3:30 (IRST)

Geshmiran Rural District (Persian: دهستان گشمیران) (Note: Formerly Poshtkuh Rural District (دهستان پشتكوه)) is in the Central District of Manujan County, Kerman province, Iran. Its capital is the village of Geshmiran.

== Demographics ==
=== Population ===
At the time of the 2006 National Census, the rural district's population was 2,110 in 489 households. There were 1,857 inhabitants in 443 households at the following census of 2011. The 2016 census measured the population of the rural district as 1,584 in 442 households. The most populous of its 33 villages was Geshmiran, with 526 people.
