= Qaleh Rural District (Manujan County) =

Rural district in Kerman province, Iran

Qaleh Rural District Persian: دهستان قلعه
- Rural District
- Location within Iran
- Coordinates: 27°25′29″N 57°41′46″E
- Country: Iran
- Province: Kerman
- County: Manujan
- District: Central
- Capital: Manujan

Population (2016)
  - Total: 29,332
- Time zone: UTC+3:30 (IRST)

Qaleh Rural District (Persian: دهستان قلعه) is in the Central District of Manujan County, Kerman province, Iran. It is administered from the city of Manujan. (Note: Also known as Qaleh)

== Demographics ==
=== Population ===
At the time of the 2006 National Census, the rural district's population was 21,981 in 4,387 households. There were 29,132 inhabitants in 7,416 households at the following census of 2011. The 2016 census measured the population of the rural district as 29,332 in 7,945 households. The most populous of its 138 villages was Sarras, with 2,350 people.
