= Manujan County =

County in Kerman province, Iran

Manujan County Persian: شهرستان منوجان
- County
- Location of Manujan County in Kerman province (bottom left, yellow)

- Location of Kerman province in Iran
- Coordinates: 27°26′N 57°38′E
- Country: Iran
- Province: Kerman
- Capital: Manujan
- Districts: Central, Aseminun

Population (2016)
  - Total: 65,705
- Time zone: UTC+3:30 (IRST)

Manujan County (Persian: شهرستان منوجان) is in Kerman province, Iran. Its capital is the city of Manujan.

== History ==
After the 2006 National Census, Deh Kahan Rural District was transferred to the Central District of Kahnuj County.

== Demographics ==
=== Language and ethnicity ===
The people of Manujan are Baloch and Balochi is the predominant language.

=== Population ===
At the time of the 2006 census, the county's population was 63,270 in 13,361 households. The following census in 2011 counted 64,528 people in 16,442 households. The 2016 census measured the population of the county as 65,705 in 18,352 households.

=== Administrative divisions ===
Manujan County's population history and administrative structure over three consecutive censuses are shown in the following table.

Manujan County Population
Administrative Divisions	2006	2011	2016
Central District	38,709	48,138	49,428
Geshmiran RD (Note: Formerly Poshtkuh Rural District)	2,110	1,857	1,584
Nurabad RD	2,508	2,863	2,878
Qaleh RD	21,981	29,132	29,332
Manujan (city)	12,110	14,286	15,634
Aseminun District	24,561	16,390	16,268
Bajgan RD (Note: Formerly Manujan Rural District)	6,545	6,796	6,463
Deh Kahan RD (Note: Transferred to Kahnuj County)	9,476		
Nowdezh RD	3,030	4,310	4,243
Nowdezh (city)	5,510	5,284	5,562
Total	63,270	64,528	65,705
RD = Rural District

== See also ==
Media related to Manujan County at Wikimedia Commons
