= Central District (Manujan County) =

District in Kerman province, Iran

Central District (Manujan County) Persian: بخش مرکزی شهرستان منوجان
- District
- Location within Iran
- Coordinates: 27°17′26″N 57°42′12″E
- Country: Iran
- Province: Kerman
- County: Manujan
- Capital: Manujan

Population (2016)
  - Total: 49,428
- Time zone: UTC+3:30 (IRST)

The Central District of Manujan County (Persian: بخش مرکزی شهرستان منوجان) is in Kerman province, Iran. Its capital is the city of Manujan.

== Demographics ==
=== Population ===
At the time of the 2006 National Census, the district's population was 38,709 in 8,019 households. The following census in 2011 counted 48,138 people in 12,069 households. The 2016 census measured the population of the district as 49,428 inhabitants in 13,504 households.

=== Administrative divisions ===
Central District (Manujan County) population
Administrative divisions	2006	2011	2016
Geshmiran RD (Note: Formerly Poshtkuh Rural District)	2,110	1,857	1,584
Nurabad RD	2,508	2,863	2,878
Qaleh RD	21,981	29,132	29,332
Manujan (city)	12,110	14,286	15,634
Total	38,709	48,138	49,428
RD = Rural District
