= Kvænangen =

Kvænangen (historically Quenangen; Northern Sami: Návuotna; Kven: Naavuono) may refer to:

== Places ==
- Kvænangen Municipality, a municipality in Troms county, Norway
- Kvænangen (fjord), a fjord in Troms county, Norway
- Kvænangen concentration camp, a World War II era concentration camp located in Troms county, Norway

== Other ==
- Quenangen Mining Association, a now-defunct English mining association located in Troms county, Norway
