= Kjækan =

Village in Kvænangen, Norway

Kjækan (Norwegian); Kätkänen (Kven); Geahkkán (Northern Sami)
- Village
- Interactive map of: Kjækan (Norwegian); Kätkänen (Kven); Geahkkán (Northern Sami)
- Location within Troms Location within Norway
- Coordinates: 69°46′44″N 22°5′0″E
- Country: Norway
- Region: Northern Norway
- County: Troms
- District: Nord-Troms
- Municipality: Kvænangen Municipality
- Elevation: 16 m (52 ft)
- Time zone: UTC+01:00 (CET)
  - Summer (DST): UTC+02:00 (CEST)
- Post Code: 9162 Sørstraumen

Kjækan (Norwegian), Kätkänen (Kven), or Geahkkán (Northern Sami) is a village in Kvænangen Municipality in Troms county, Norway.

== Geography ==
The village is located along the shore of Kjækan Bay (Norwegian: Kjækanbukta, Kven: Kätkäsenmukka, Northern Sami: Geahkánmohkki or Geahkkánluokta) at the southeast end of the Kvænangen fjord, about 18 kilometers (11 mi) south of the municipal center of Burfjord. County Road 367 runs through the village. The Kjækan River (Norwegian: Kjækanelva, Kven: Kätkäsenjoki, Northern Sami: Geahkkánjohka) flows into the village from the east and empties into the bay.

== Name ==
The name of the village is semantically opaque; neither the Norwegian name Kjækan nor Northern Sami name Geahkán has a clear meaning. However, the Kven name Kätkynen indicates that the name may be derived from Sami geatki 'wolverine, glutton'. If so, the name of the village was originally Sami (now lost), the Kven name was borrowed from Sami, the Norwegian name from Kven, and the current Sami name from Norwegian. A pseudoetymology of the name associates it with the Kven verb kätkeä 'hide, conceal', referring to copper ore "hidden" up in the valley above the village.

== History ==
Copper ore was discovered above Kjækan in the 19th century by agents for the Alta-based Alten Copper Works, a firm owned by the British merchant John Rice Crowe (1795–1877). Copper ore was mined at the site from 1840 to 1878. However, the effort of transporting the ore down to the bay for transport to the nearby village of Kåfjord for smelting made it difficult to exploit the deposit. The mining activity corresponded to a population surge: in 1835 there were only 100 people in the village, but by 1865 the population had grown to 546. The population declined to 357 in 1875, as the mine was shutting down, and by 1900 there were only 201 people living in Kjækan.
