= Quenangen Mining Association =

Mining company

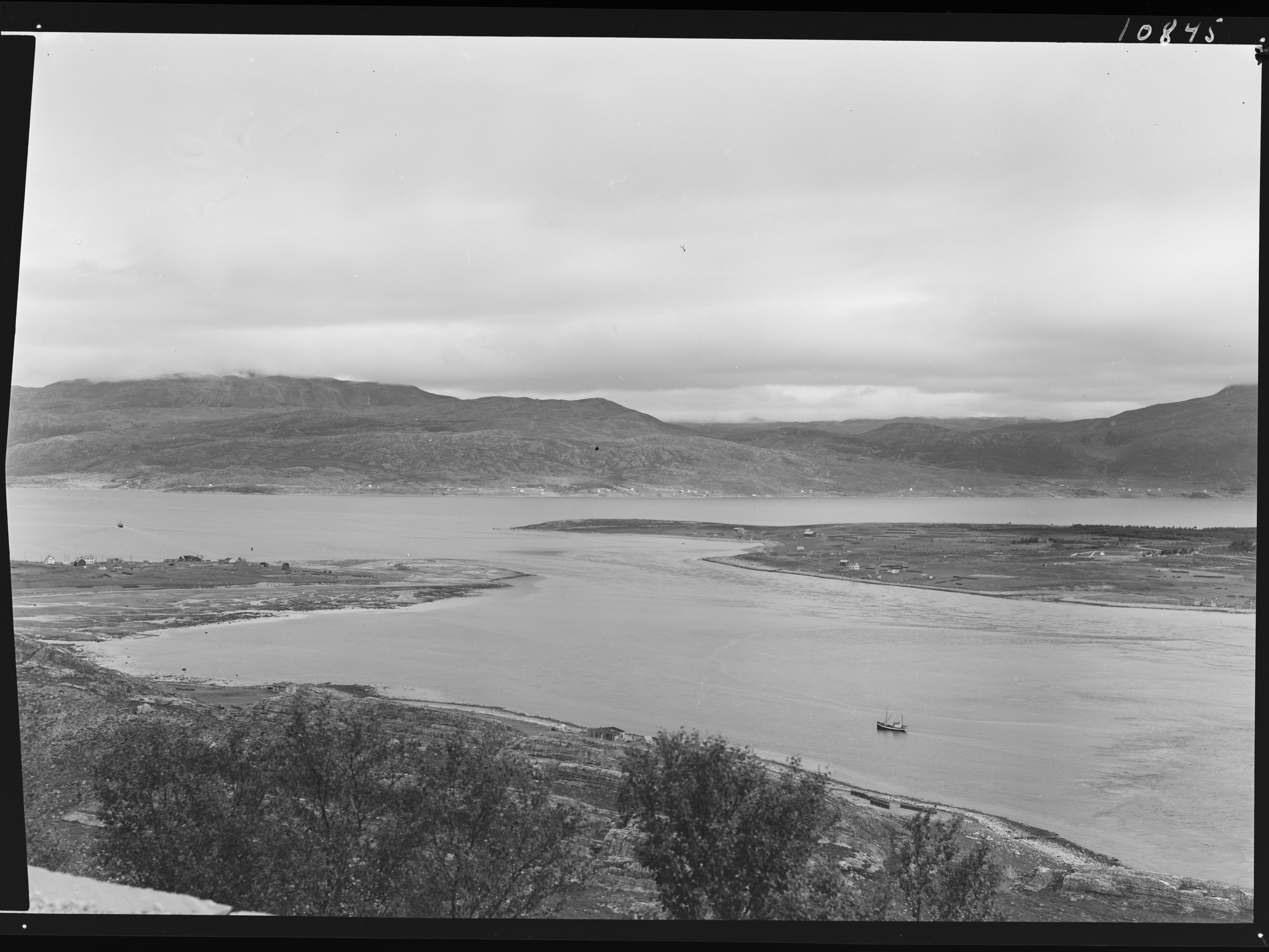
Kvænang Fjord, where the Quenangen Mining Association was established around 1826.

The Quenangen Mining Association was an English industry that operated copper mines in the area surrounding the Kvænangen fjord in Northern Norway in the 1800s.

== Background ==
Around 1826, the Englishmen John Rice Crowe and Henry Dick Woodfall started a company to extract copper ore in the prestegjeld (parish]] of Alta. This company was named the Alten Copper Works and was later renamed the Kåfjord Copper Works (Kåfjord kobberverk).

John Rice Crowe (1795–1877) had started trading in Hammerfest around 1820.

On May 17, 1827 the reindeer herder Maret Aslaksdatter signed a contract whereby she transferred the right to exploit the copper ore deposits found near the village of Kåfjord to John Rice Crowe. As payment, she received 50 våger (about 900 kilograms or 2,000 pounds) of whole-grain rye flour.

== Mining in Kvænangen ==
Not long after the start of operations Alta, John Rice Crowe took an interest in the ore deposits in the neighboring parish of Kvænangen, a large area surrounding the Kvænangen fjord. As early as 1743, there were reports of copper ore in Kvænangen, but no one had taken steps to start mining there based on the finds.

Together with merchants from Hammerfest, Crowe founded the Quenangen Mining Association to mine in Kvænangen (Quenangen is the historic spelling of the area, the modern spelling is Kvænangen). Around 1827, they began investigated the ore deposits, and the surveys continued for many years. It was not until 1840 that mining operations got underway in Kvænangen, starting with Kjækan.

Several mines were established in Kvænangen; the largest were the Edward Mine (Edwards gruve) and Cedar Mine (Cedars gruve). The Edward Mine was the first to be opened. It was located on the Kjækan River (Kjækanelva), a few kilometers from the sea. The company built housing for workers at Kjækan. When copper ore was found further up in the mountains, on the Badder River (Badderelva), new mines were established there. It was too far for the workers to commute daily, so the Quenangen Mining Association built temporary housing for the workers near the new mines and introduced five-day work weeks so that workers could visit their families down in the valley on weekends.

However, copper prices fell on the world market, and the Quenangen Mining Association experienced financial problems. At the end of the 1840s, the company sold its mines in Kvænangen to the Kåfjord plant, but the Kvænangen plant remained independent until 1857. Then the two works were formally merged into one company.

== Later years ==
The Alta works, which the Kvænangen mines were part of, were closed together with the company Sulitjelma Aktiebolag in 1896. After that, the old trading site of Badderen became the center for new mining operations in Kvænangen. An ore quay was built at Badderen with a road to the mines, and a telephone line was also set up.
