= Norwegian County Road 362 (Troms) =

Road in the municipality of Kvænangen in Troms county, Norway

County Road 362

Route information
- Length: 5.4 km (3.4 mi)

Major junctions
- South end: E6 at Undereidet, Kvænangen Municipality
- North end: Doarrás, Kvænangen Municipality

Location
- Country: Norway
- Counties: Troms

Highway system
- Roads in Norway; National Roads; County Roads

County Road 362 (Norwegian: fylkesvei 362) is a 5.4-kilometer (3.4 mi) road in Kvænangen Municipality in Troms county, Norway.

The road branches off from European Route E6 at Undereidet north of the village of Badderen and runs northwest along the coast of the Badderfjord before terminating at Bankenes on the Doarrás peninsula.

The road is also named Jafet Lindebergs vei (Jafet Lindeberg Road) after Jafet Lindeberg (1874–1962), a gold prospector and co-founder of the city of Nome, Alaska.
