= Sekkemo Church =

- Sekkemo kirke
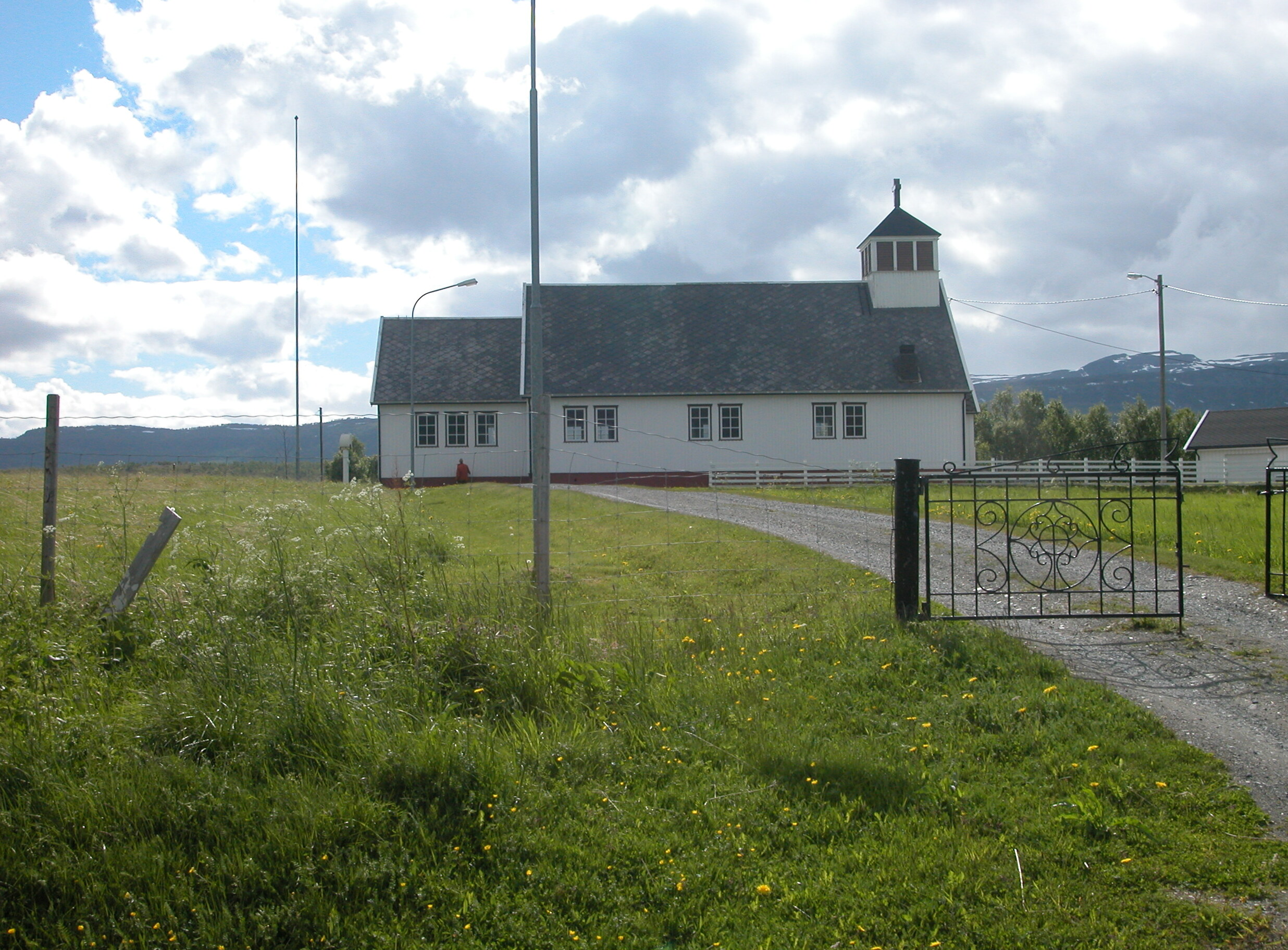
- View of the church
- Sekkemo Church
- 69.839301°N 21.934579°E
- Location: Kvænangen, Troms
- Country: Norway
- Denomination: Church of Norway
- Churchmanship: Evangelical Lutheran

History
- Status: Parish church
- Founded: 1956
- Consecrated: 16 Sept 1956

Architecture
- Functional status: Active
- Architect: Olaug Kaasen
- Architectural type: Long church
- Completed: 1956 (70 years ago)

Specifications
- Capacity: 330

Administration
- Diocese: Nord-Hålogaland
- Deanery: Nord-Troms prosti
- Parish: Kvænangen
- Norwegian Cultural Heritage Site
- Type: Church
- Status: Not protected
- ID: 85411

Sekkemo Church (Norwegian: Sekkemo kirke) is a parish church of the Church of Norway in Kvænangen Municipality in Troms county, Norway. It is located in the village of Sekkemo. It is one of the churches for the Kvænangen parish which is part of the Nord-Troms prosti (deanery) in the Diocese of Nord-Hålogaland. The white, wooden church was built in a long church style in 1956 using plans drawn up by the architect Olaug Kaasen. The church seats about 330 people.

== History ==
The first church in Sekkemo was built in 1956 to replace the historic Skorpa Church as the main church for the municipality since Skorpa Church was on the island of Skorpa in the middle of the Kvænangen fjord and the majority of the population lived on the mainland. This new church was much more accessible to the people. The new church was consecrated on 16 September 1956 by the Bishop Alf Wiig.

== See also ==
- List of churches in Nord-Hålogaland
