= Norwegian County Road 367 =

Road in the municipality of Kvænangen in Troms County, Norway

County Road 367

Route information
- Length: 38.94 km (24.20 mi)

Major junctions
- East end: E6 at Karvik
- Fv361 at Kjøllefjord
- West end: E6 Sekkemo

Location
- Country: Norway
- Counties: Troms

Highway system
- Roads in Norway; National Roads; County Roads

County Road 367 (Norwegian: Fylkesvei 367) is 38.94 kilometers (24.20 mi) long and runs between the villages of Karvik and Sekkemo in Kvænangen Municipality in Troms County, Norway. Until the Sørstraumen Bridge was opened in the summer of 1980, the road was part of European route E6.
