= Norwegian County Road 7958 =

Road in Kvænangen Municipality in Troms County, Norway

County Road 7958

Route information
- Length: 5.18 km (3.22 mi)

Major junctions
- East end: E6 at Nordstraumen
- West end: Fv367 Kjøllefjord

Location
- Country: Norway
- Counties: Troms

Highway system
- Roads in Norway; National Roads; County Roads

County Road 7958 (Norwegian: Fylkesvei 7958) is 5.18 kilometers (3.22 mi) long and runs between Nordstraumen and Kjøllefjord in Kvænangen Municipality in Troms County, Norway. The road branches off of European route E6 and circles around the Sekkemo marsh (Norwegian: Sekkemomyra, Kven: Isojänkkä, Northern Sami: Stuorajeaggi) to the north and runs along the edge of Kvænangen fjord until connecting with County Road 367. Farms occupy the land descending from the road to the fjord, and the land above the road is covered in low-growing deciduous trees and heather. Historically, the road was called County Road 361.
