= Veidal Prison Camp =

World War II prison camp in Norway

Coordinates: 69.8964°N 21.6071°E

The Veidal Prison Camp (Norwegian: Veidal fangeleir, German: Gefangenenlager Veidal Kvænangen) was established in Kvænangen Municipality in Troms county, Norway, in August 1942 by the German occupation authorities. The prison camp was a subunit of the Grini Prison Camp and, together with the Badderen Prison Camp, was created to erect snow fences and build snow sheds along a 6-kilometer (3.7 mi) length of roadway over Kvænangsfjellet mountain. Four hundred prisoners from the Grini camp were sent to Kvænangsfjellet to assist Norwegian civilian laborers with the construction. The prisoners remained on the mountain for three months, from August 14, 1942, to November 11, 1942.

The construction work for the snow sheds and snow fences was led by Organisation Todt, and the camp was guarded by the Wehrmacht.

The prisoners that were sent from Grini to the Veidal camp to work on the snow sheds included the artist Per Krohg and the architect Odd Nansen. Both of them wrote about their time on Kvænangsfjellet: Per Krohg in Memoarer – minner og meninger (Memoirs: Memories and Opinions; 1966) and Odd Nansen in Fra dag til dag (Day after Day; vol. 2, 1946).
