= Henry Woodfall Crowe =

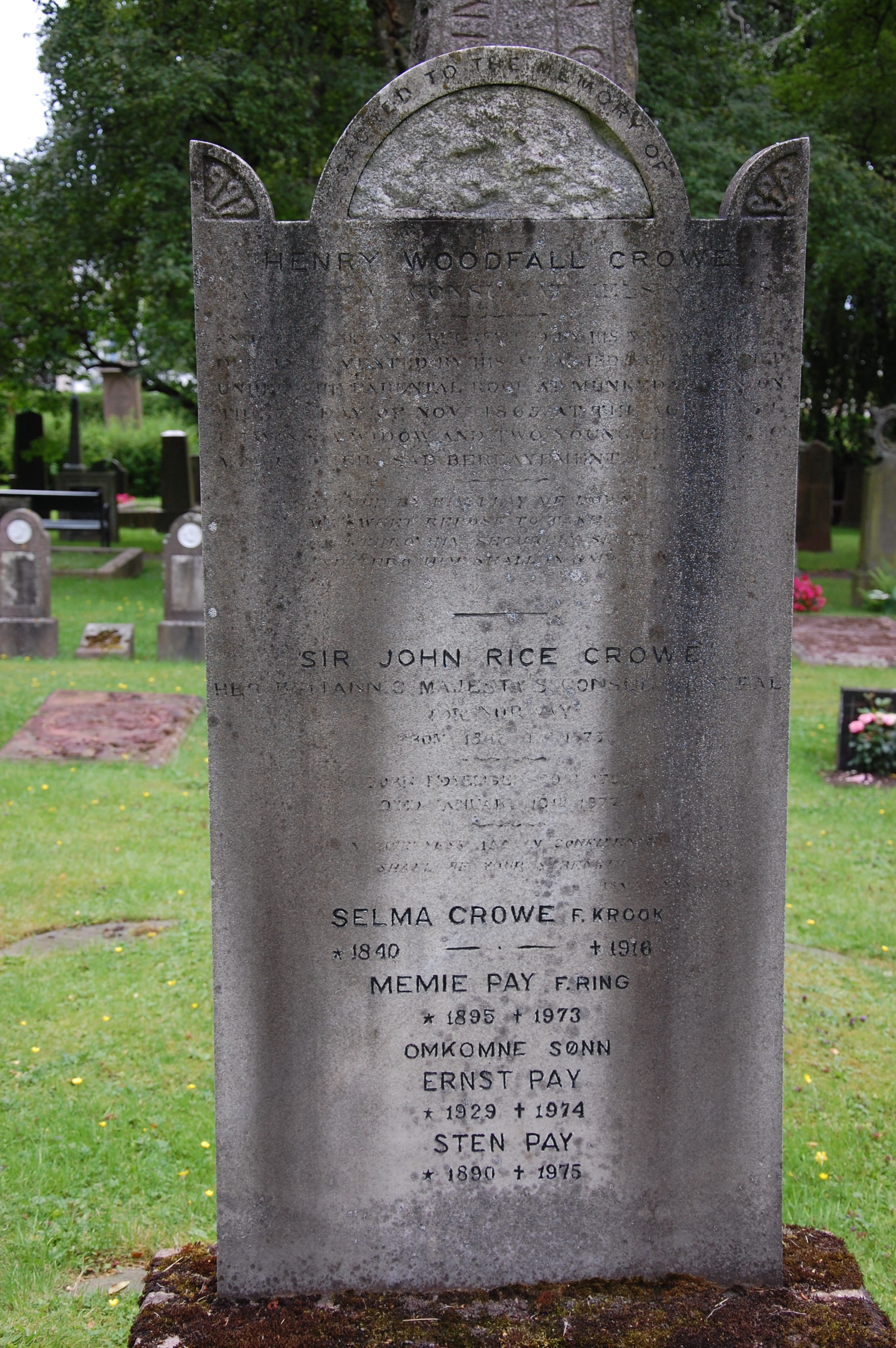
Henry Woodfall Crowe's gravestone in Oslo

Henry Woodfall Crowe (April 29, 1832 – November 7, 1865) was a British-Norwegian interpreter, translator, and author.

== Biography ==
Crowe was born in Kåfjord, Norway, the son of John Rice Crowe (1795–1877) and Malene Marie Waad (1802–1843). Together with Henry Dick Woodfall, his father started the company Alten Copper Works near Alta around 1826. The company was later renamed the Kåfjord Copper Works. Henry Woodfall Crowe was named after his father's business partner.

He participated in the Crimean War in 1854 and 1855 as the interpreter general to the British fleet. Crowe's diary of his experiences on the warship HMS Duke of Wellington during the war was issued as a book in 2012 by one of his relatives. At the time, The Duke of Wellington was the world's largest battleship and the ship's commander, Charles Napier, was a legend in his own time.

Crowe later served as the British consul in Helsinki.

Crowe died in Christiania and is buried there in Our Savior's Cemetery.

== Works ==
- The Bothnia Pilot, by Admiral G. af Klint, translated by C. Bernard Coster, revised by Henry Woodfall Crowe (1855)
- The Crimean War Journals (1854–1855) of Henry Woodfall Crowe on Board H.M.S. Duke of Wellington, researched and transcribed by Bernard Robert Crowe (2012)
