= Badderen =

Village in Kvænangen, Norway

Badderen: Badderen (Norwegian); Báttár (Northern Sami); Paattari (Kven)
- Village
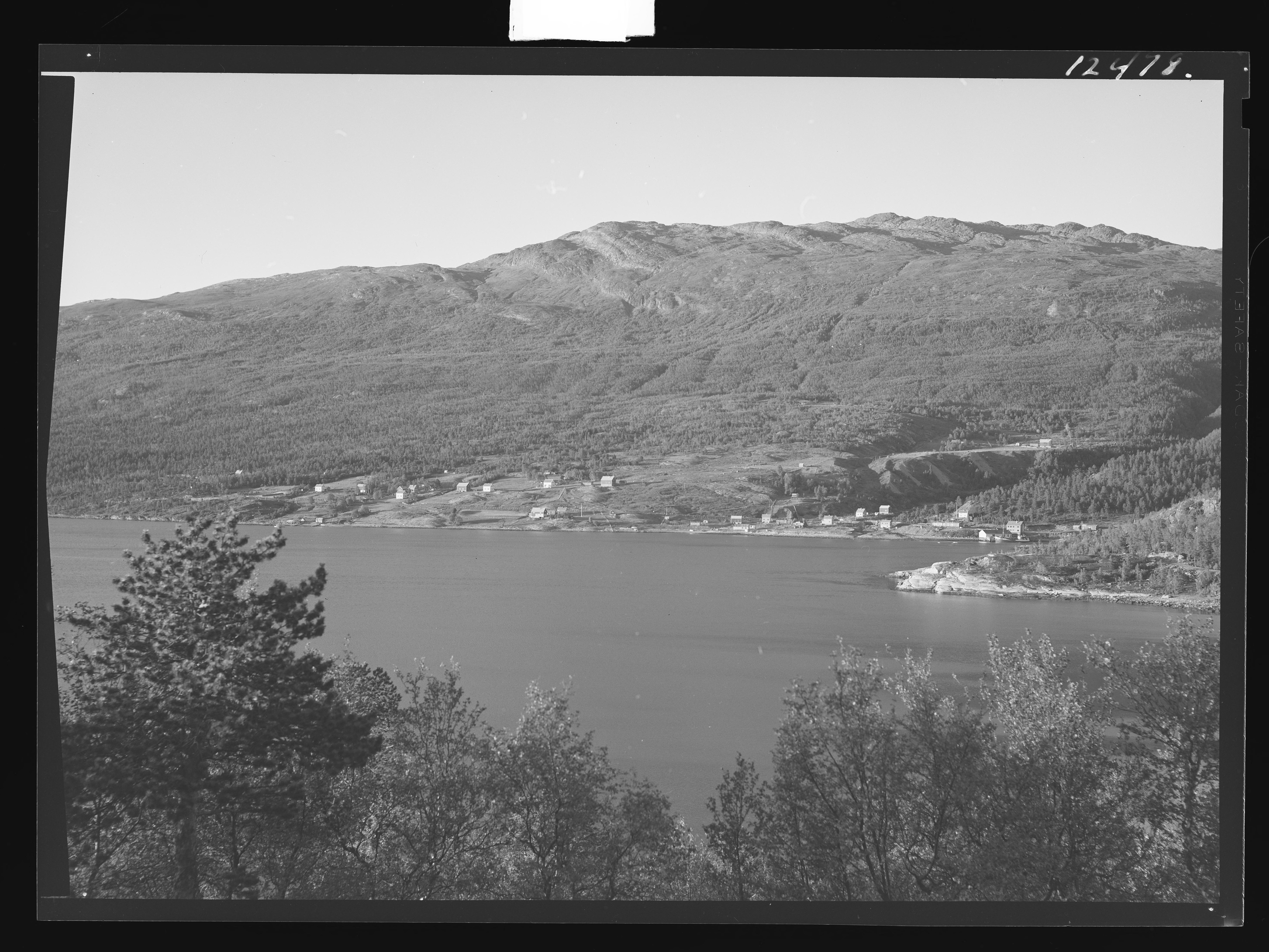
- Badderen in 1952 or 1953
- Interactive map of Badderen
- Location within Troms Location within Norway
- Coordinates: 69.8451°N 22.0261°E
- Country: Norway
- Region: Western Norway
- County: Troms
- District: Nord-Troms
- Municipality: Kvænangen Municipality
- Elevation: 11 m (36 ft)
- Time zone: UTC+01:00 (CET)
  - Summer (DST): UTC+02:00 (CEST)
- Post Code: 9162 Sørstraumen

Badderen (Norwegian), Báttár (Northern Sami), or Paattari (Kven) is a village in Kvænangen Municipality in Troms county, Norway. It lies at the head of the Badderfjord, about 13 kilometers (8.1 mi) south of the municipal seat of Burfjord. The European route E6 highway passes through the village. The basic statistical unit (grunnkrets) of Badderen, which also includes the hamlet of Undereidet, had a population of 183 in 2015.

== History ==
As early as 1743 there were reports of copper ore found in Kvænangen, but further investigations were not carried out until 1827 by the Quenangen Mining Association. One of the stakeholders in this company was the Englishman John Rice Crowe, who already ran the Alten Copper Works (later the Kåfjord Copper Works) in Alta together with Henry Dick Woodfall. Surveys of the ore deposits in Kvænangen continued for several years, and full mining in Kvænangen started in 1840, beginning with Kjækan. Several mines were established in Kvænangen; the largest were the Edwards mine and Cedar mine. The Alta plant, which the Kvænangen mines were part of, merged with the company Sulitjelma Aktiebolag in 1896. Then the old trading center of Badderen became the center for new mining operations in Kvænangen. An ore quay was built at Badderen in the early 1900s with a road to the mines. A telephone line was also set up.

The director's residence at Badderen was dismantled in 1903 and rebuilt in Sulitjelma for the new director of the Sulitjelma Mines. This building was later used as the Sulitjelma Hotel.
