= Odd Olsen =

Odd Olsen can refer to:

- Odd Olsen, Norwegian investigator of British European Airways Flight 530 in 1946
- Odd Rikard Olsen (1947–2012), Norwegian newspaper editor and politician
- Odd Olsen Ingerø (born 1950), Norwegian politician
- Odd Inge Olsen (born 1969), Norwegian footballer
