= Skorpa Church =

- Skorpa kirke
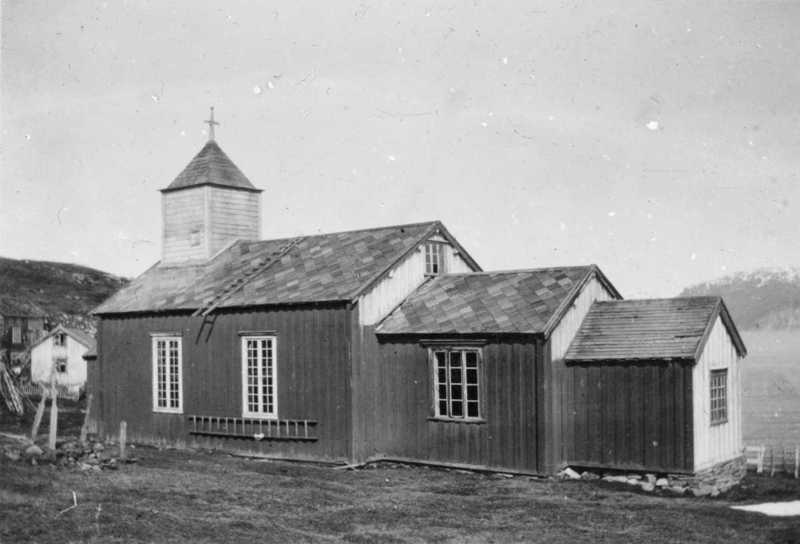
- View of the church
- Skorpa Church
- 69.931139°N 21.726451°E
- Location: Kvænangen, Troms
- Country: Norway
- Denomination: Church of Norway
- Churchmanship: Evangelical Lutheran

History
- Status: Parish church
- Founded: 1795
- Consecrated: 18 September 1850

Architecture
- Functional status: Inactive
- Architectural type: Long church
- Completed: 1850 (176 years ago)
- Closed: 1956 (70 years ago)

Specifications
- Capacity: 300
- Materials: Wood

Administration
- Diocese: Nord-Hålogaland
- Deanery: Nord-Troms prosti
- Parish: Kvænangen
- Norwegian Cultural Heritage Site
- Type: Church
- Status: Listed
- ID: 85476

Skorpa Church (Norwegian: Skorpa kirke) is a historic parish church of the Church of Norway in Kvænangen Municipality in Troms county, Norway. It is located on the small island of Skorpa. It used to be the church for the Kvænangen parish which is part of the Nord-Troms prosti (deanery) in the Diocese of Nord-Hålogaland. The white, wooden church was built in a long church style in 1850 using plans drawn up by an unknown architect. The church seats about 300 people. In 1956, the church was taken out of regular use when the new Sekkemo Church was completed on the mainland.

== History ==
A chapel was built on the island of Skorpa in 1795. It may not have been the first chapel on Skorpa, but there is little known before that time. The chapel was likely built during the missionary period where Thomas von Westen was trying to evangelize the local Sami people. The chapel was consecrated in 1806 by the local priest Angell. Skorpa was originally an annex chapel under the main Skjervøy Church and the priest came to the island about four times each year.

The old chapel was torn down and replaced with the current church building in 1850. The new church was consecrated on 18 September 1850 by the Bishop Daniel Bremer Juell. When Kvænangen became an independent municipality in 1863, this church became the main church for the municipality. The island, which originally was the administrative centre of the municipality, gradually became much less populated and later the administration was moved to Burfjord on the mainland. In 1956, Sekkemo Church was built on the mainland and that church became the main church for the municipality. Today, Skorpa is an uninhabited island and the church is only rarely used—mostly for special occasions.

== See also ==
- List of churches in Nord-Hålogaland
