= Badderfjord =

Fjord in Kvænangen Municipality in Troms county, Norway

Badderfjord (Norwegian); Báttárvuonna (Northern Sami)
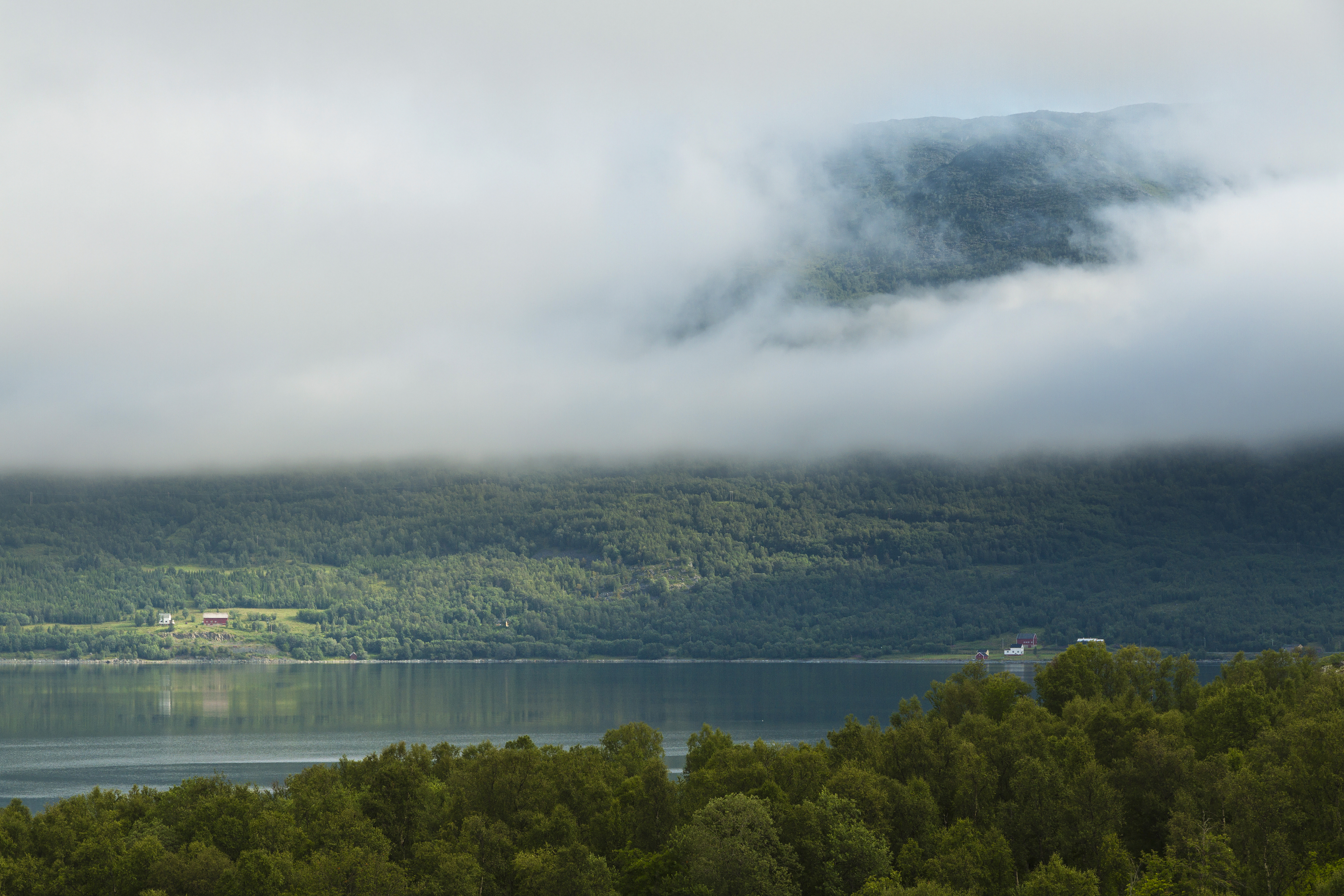
- View of the fjord in August 2014
- Interactive map of the fjord
- Location: Troms county, Norway
- Coordinates: 69.8534°N 21.9462°E
- Type: Fjord
- Primary outflows: Kvænangen fjord
- Basin countries: Norway
- Max. length: 5 kilometres (3.1 mi)
- Max. width: 3 kilometres (1.9 mi)
- Settlements: Sekkemo, Badderen

The Badderfjord (Norwegian) or Báttárvuonna (Northern Sami) is a small fjord that branches off of the main Kvænangen fjord in Kvænangen Municipality in Troms county, Norway. The fjord is 5 kilometers (3.1 mi) long and 3 kilometers (1.9 mi) wide and it extends from its mouth between Steinnes and Nordnes eastward to the head of the fjord at the village of Badderen, which the fjord is named after. Other settlements along the fjord include Undereidet on the north side and Sekkemo on the south side. West of Nordnes lies the Sørstraumen strait near the village of Sørstraumen, where European Route E6 crosses the Sørstraumen Bridge over the Kvænangen fjord. European Route E6 then continues along the south and east sides of the Badderfjord.

== See also ==
- List of Norwegian fjords
