= Kvænangsfjellet =

Line of mountains in Troms county, Norway

Kvænangsfjellet (Norwegian); Návuonvárri (Northern Sami); Naavuononvaara (Kven)
- Location of the mountain

Highest point
- Coordinates: 69.9001°N 21.5566°E

Geography
- Location: Troms, Norway

Kvænangsfjellet (Norwegian), Návuonvárri (Northern Sami), or Naavuononvaara (Kven) is a line of mountains along the border of Kvænangen Municipality and Nordreisa Municipality in Troms county, Norway. The European route E6 highway traverses the mountains through a mountain pass between the Øksfjorden in the west to the Kvænangen fjord in the east. In the winter, route E6 is closed for 10 to 15 days due to snow storms. A short stretch of the route is exposed to the weather, a gap near the route's highest point, at 402 meters (1,319 ft). During the Second World War, the German occupation authorities built a wooden superstructure approximately 6 kilometers (3.7 mi) long using labor from the Veidal Prison Camp to protect the route. The structure was destroyed in scorched earth tactics when the Germans withdrew to the south in 1944.

The Gildetun Inn (Norwegian: Gjestehuset Gildetun) is located along the E6 road that crosses the Kvænangsfjellet. It offers accommodation and meals during tourist season. It is located at a vantage place where tourists are able to photograph the mountain and fjord landscape. It also has a taxidermy display of local birds and other animals.

The Kvænangsfjellet area is used in the summer by Sami reindeer herders.

== Gallery ==
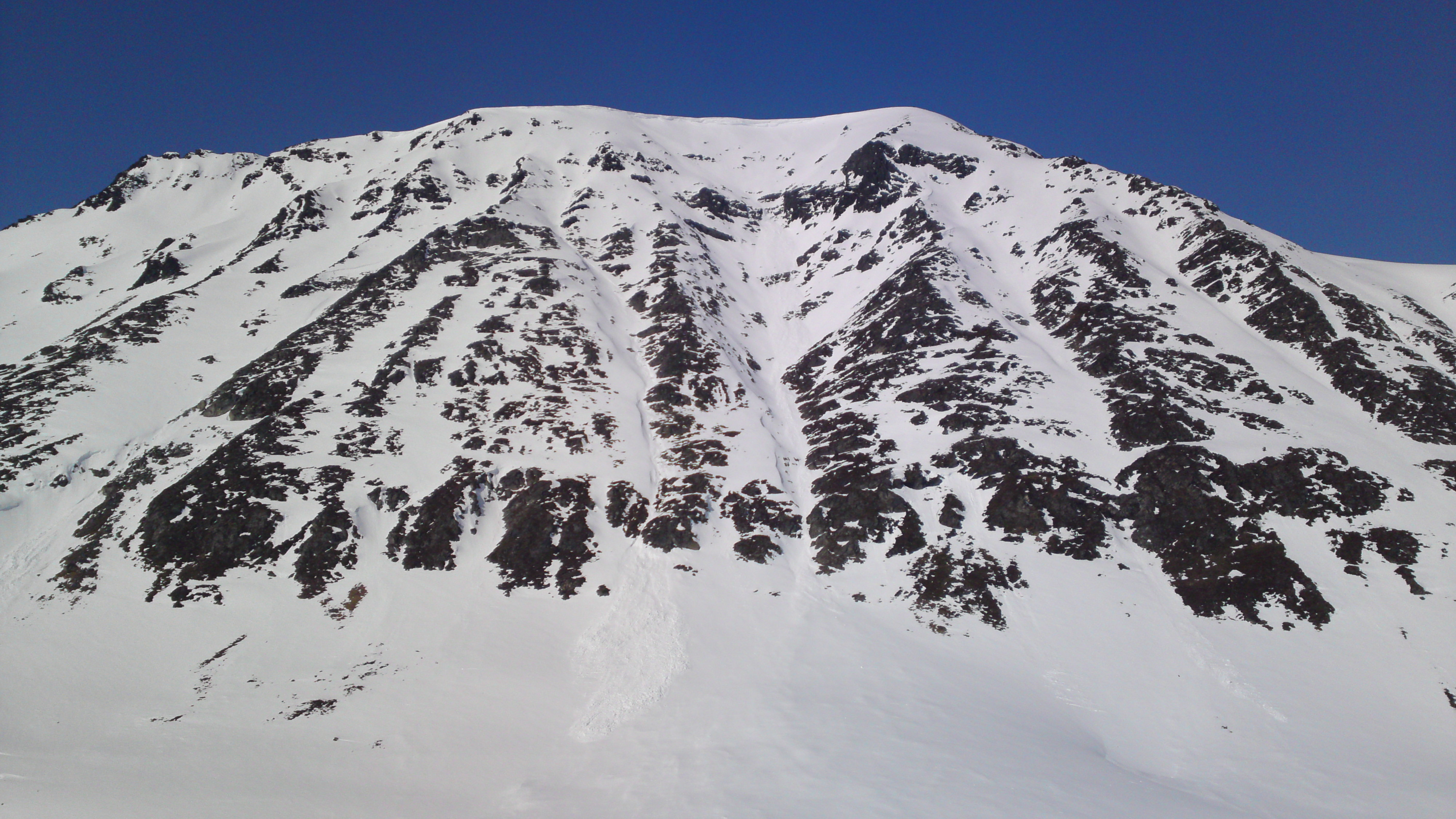
Storbukttind (literally, 'Big Bay Peak'; 1,054 meters or 3,458 feet) stands just west of route E6.

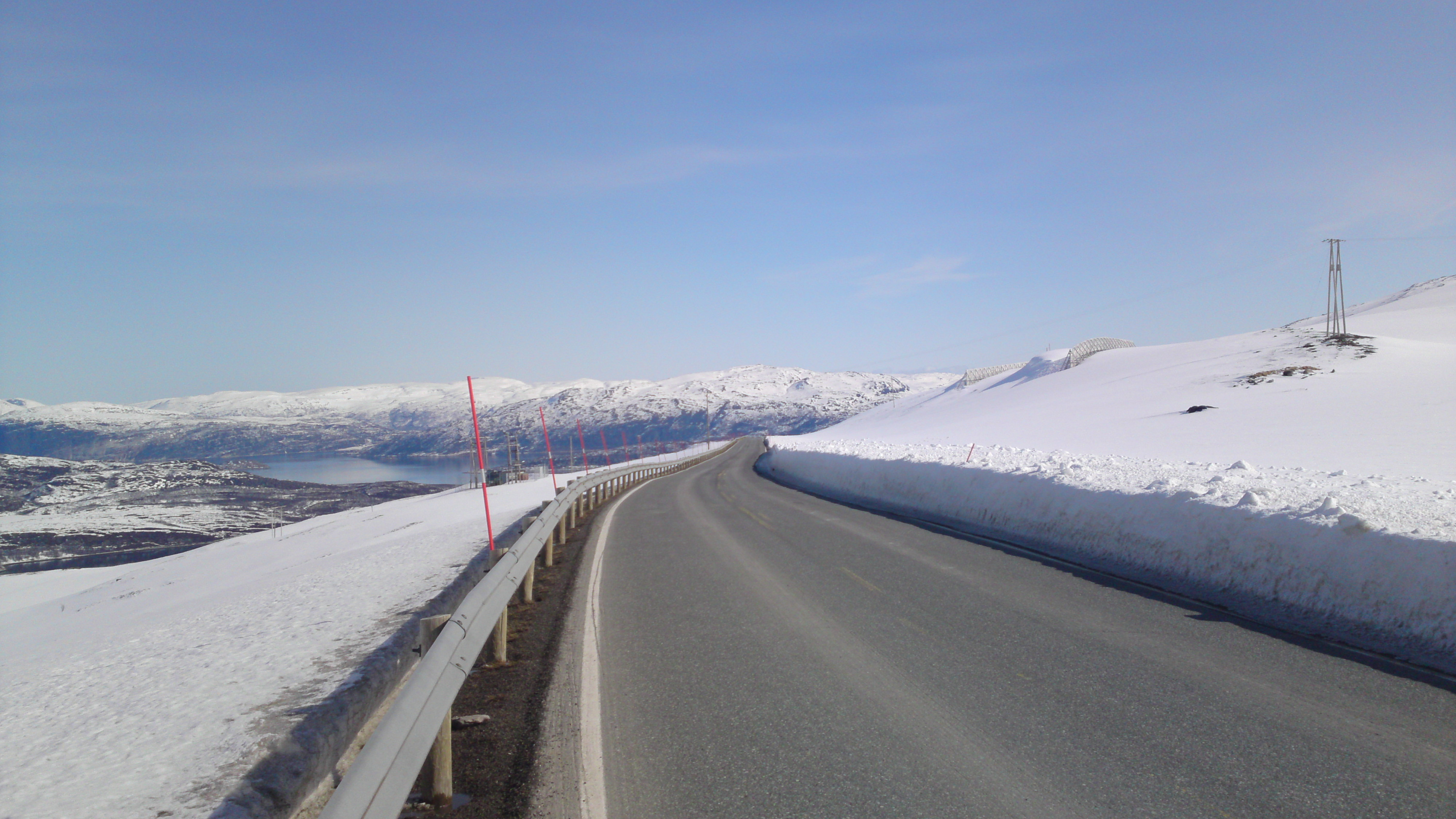
The road over Kvænangsfjellet in April.

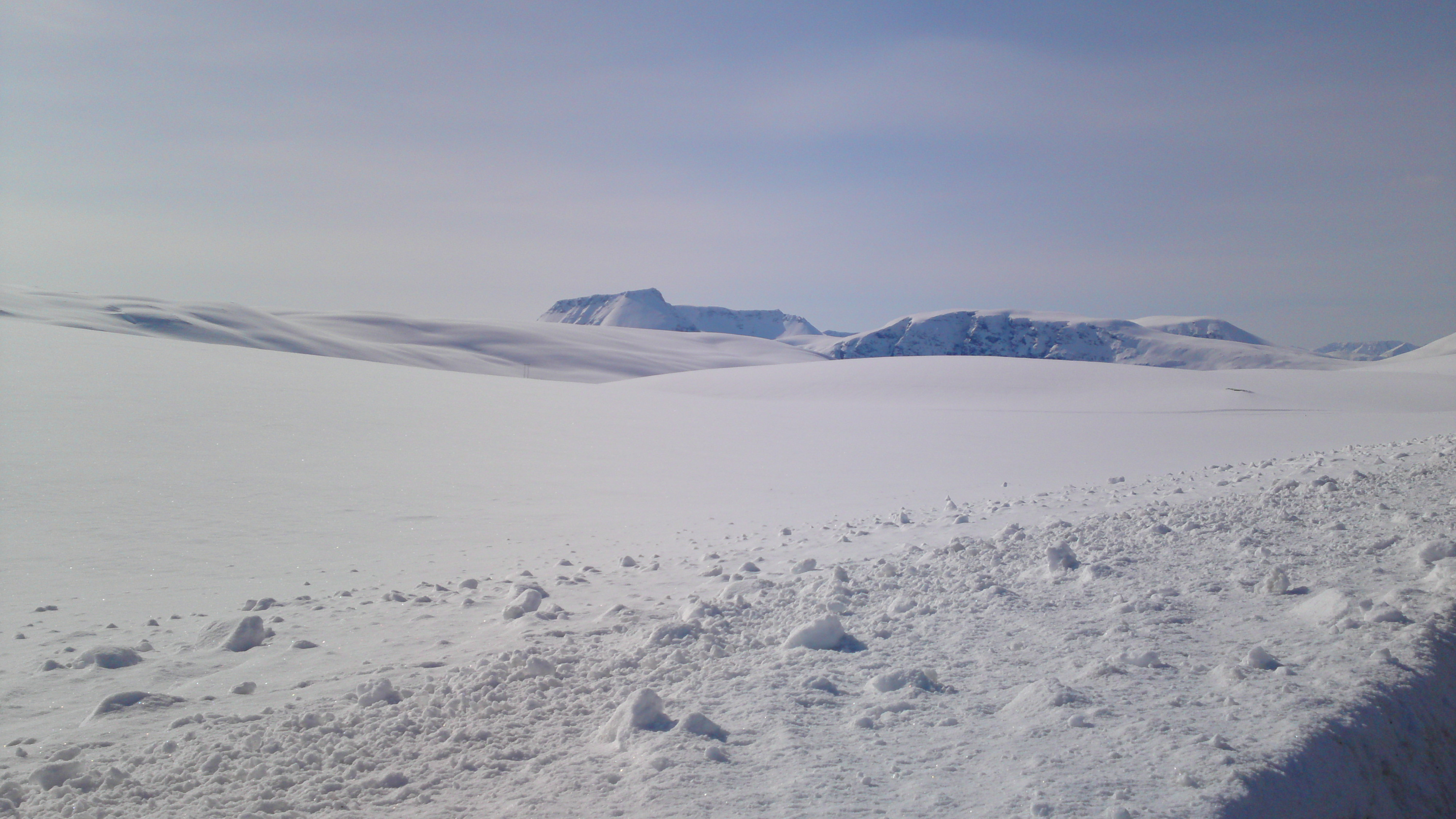
Kvænangsfjellet ski area, east of route E6.
