= Sulitjelma Hotel =

Hotel in Sulitjelma, Norway

Coordinates: 67°8′36″N 16°1′7″E

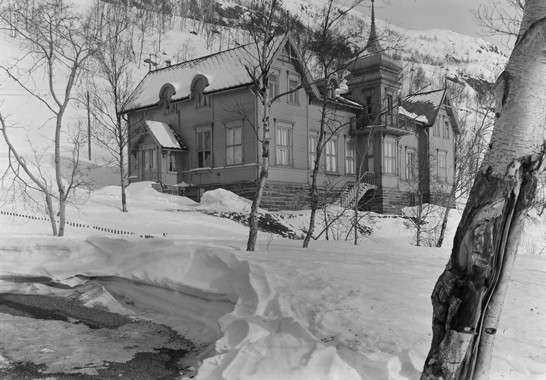
The director's residence in Sulitjelma, c. 1920–1930. From the photo library at the Nordland Museum.

The Sulitjelma Hotel (Norwegian: Sulitjelma Hotell) is a hotel located near the mines in Sulitjelma in Fauske Municipality in Nordland county, Norway.

The building served as the former residence for the director of the Sulitjelma Mines after it was moved to Sulitjelma from Badderen on the Badderfjord. In 1903 or 1906, the villa was disassembled and moved from Badderen to be rebuilt in Sulitjelma as the new director's residence for the company Sulitjelma Aktiebolag.

In 1982 the structure was converted into a hotel with 50 beds, and in 1993 the hotel was renovated and expanded so that it can now accommodate 60 people. The hotel was closed with a deficit before the Skagen Hotel took it over in 2001. The hotel was later reopened with its own spa department and improved profitability.

In early summer 2015 the hotel was put up for sale. In the fall of 2015 it was announced that the hotel was to be used as a reception center for Syrian refugees. In December 2016, the hotel was acquired by the Nordnorsk Reception Center, which stated to the media that the company plans to conduct asylum reception at the site.

In the autumn of 2019 the hotel was purchased by Salten Hotell AS with a view to reopening the hotel to guests. Hotel operations were resumed in early 2020.

== Links ==
- Sulitjelma Hotel Website
