= Alteidet =

Village in Kvænangen, Norway

Alteidet (Norwegian); Duikkáš (Northern Sami); Tuikkanen (Kven)
- Village
- Interactive map of: Alteidet (Norwegian); Duikkáš (Northern Sami); Tuikkanen (Kven)
- Location within Troms Location within Norway
- Coordinates: 70.0290°N 22.0943°E
- Country: Norway
- Region: Northern Norway
- County: Troms
- District: Nord-Troms
- Municipality: Kvænangen Municipality
- Elevation: 8 m (26 ft)
- Time zone: UTC+01:00 (CET)
  - Summer (DST): UTC+02:00 (CEST)
- Post Code: 9161 Burfjord

Alteidet (Norwegian), Duikkáš (Northern Sami), or Tuikkanen (Kven) is a small coastal village along the Lille Altafjord in the eastern part of Kvænangen Municipality in Troms county, Norway. The village is located along European route E6, about 50 km (31 mi) west of the town of Alta in Finnmark county and about 10.5 km (6.5 mi) north of the municipal centre of Burfjord. There are about 130 residents living in the area and one hotel.

The village was an old trading post, but it was not rebuilt after World War II. The village is located on a forested isthmus and is near the villages of Storeng and Jøkelfjord. The name Alteidet is a combination of "Alta" and "eidet" meaning the isthmus of Alta.
