= Kvænangen concentration camp =

Coordinates: 69.8963°N 21.6072°E

Kvænangen concentration camp was established in Kvænangen Municipality in Troms county, Norway by the Nazi administration of occupied Norway in August 1942. It was an annex to the Grini concentration camp. This camp consisted of two subcamps, Veidal and Badderen, which was also known as Veiskaret. The camp remained open until 11 November 1942, during which time about 400 prisoners were put to slave labor building a shelter over 6 kilometres (3.7 mi) of road in the area. The shelter was known as "Norway's longest" wooden house.

The camp was guarded by Wehrmacht soldiers, and run by members of Organisation Todt. Climate conditions were harsh, but prisoners received provisions both from the Red Cross in Tromsø and locals.

== See also ==
- List of Nazi-German concentration camps
