= Burfjord Church =

- Burfjord kirke
- Burfjord Church
- 69.933959°N 22.039751°E
- Location: Kvænangen, Troms
- Country: Norway
- Denomination: Church of Norway
- Churchmanship: Evangelical Lutheran

History
- Status: Parish church
- Founded: 2009
- Consecrated: 2009

Architecture
- Functional status: Active
- Architectural type: Rectangular
- Completed: 2009 (17 years ago)

Specifications
- Materials: Wood

Administration
- Diocese: Nord-Hålogaland
- Deanery: Nord-Troms prosti
- Parish: Kvænangen

Burfjord Church (Norwegian: Burfjord kirke) is a parish church of the Church of Norway in Kvænangen Municipality in Troms county, Norway. It is located in the village of Burfjord. It is one of the churches for the Kvænangen parish which is part of the Nord-Troms prosti (deanery) in the Diocese of Nord-Hålogaland. The white, wooden church was built in a rectangular style and it was first used as a bedehus chapel for a Laestadian congregation. On 5 July 2009, it was consecrated as a new church within the Church of Norway. The church seats about 80 people.

== See also ==
- List of churches in Nord-Hålogaland
