= Spildra =

Island in Kvænangen, Norway

Spildra (Norwegian) Spittá (Northern Sami)
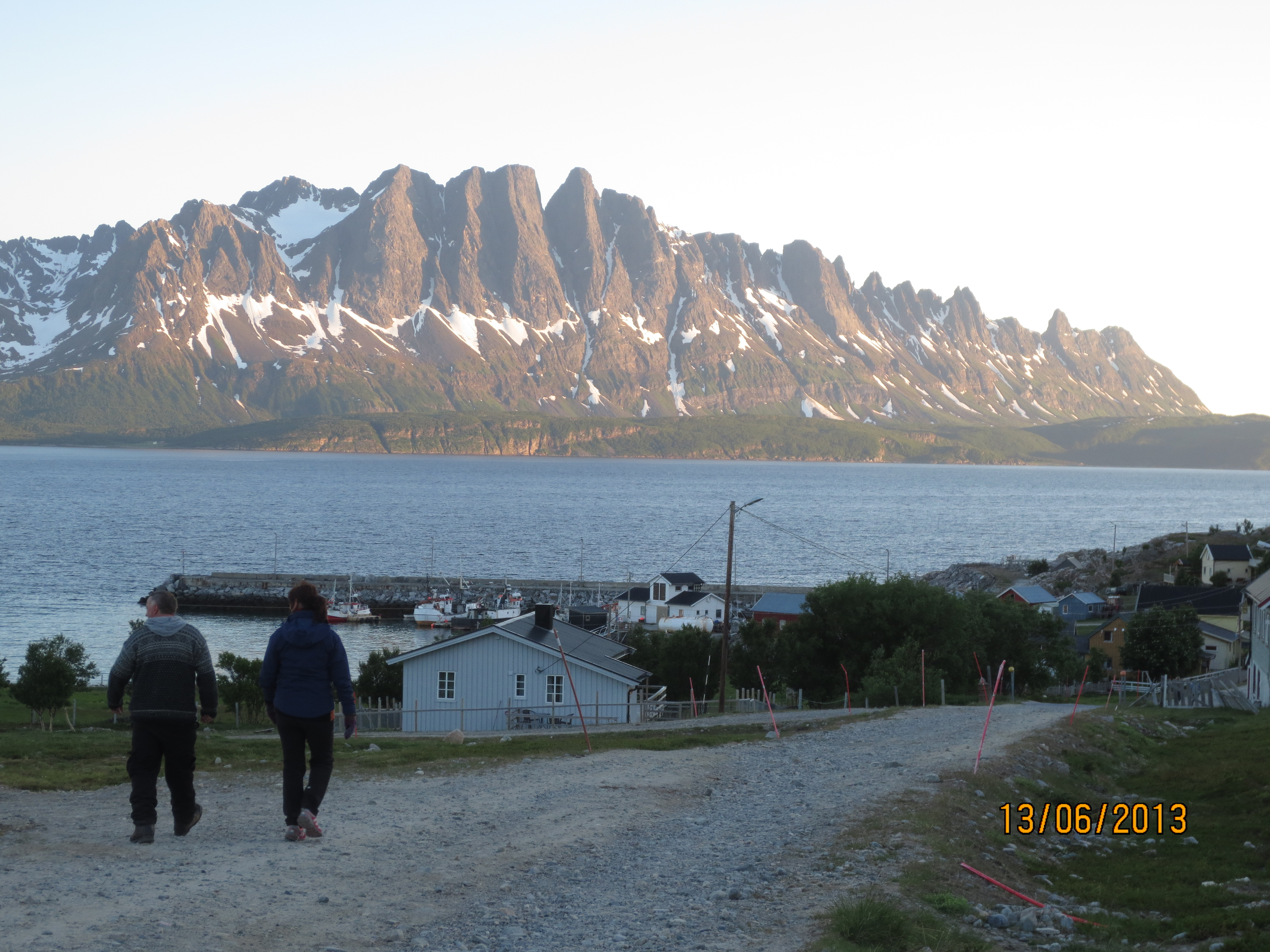
- Village of Dunvika on Spildra (looking to the mainland to the west)
- Interactive map of Spildra (Norwegian); Spittá (Northern Sami)

Geography
- Location: Kvænangen, Norway
- Coordinates: 70.0206°N 21.6311°E
- Area: 21.4 km^{2} (8.3 sq mi)
- Length: 6.5 km (4.04 mi)
- Width: 4.5 km (2.8 mi)
- Highest elevation: 444 m (1457 ft)
- Highest point: Raideren

Administration
- Norway
- County: Troms
- Municipality: Kvænangen Municipality

Demographics
- Population: 23 (2021)

Spildra (Norwegian) or Spittá (Northern Sami) is an island in Kvænangen Municipality in Troms county, Norway. The 21.4-square-kilometre (8.3 sq mi) island lies in the middle of the Kvænangen fjord, about 5 kilometres (3.1 mi) north of the island of Skorpa. The island has a population (2021) of 23 people, with everyone living along the southern coast. The only access to the island is by boat. The population has been declining over time. The main economic activities on the island center around the production of Boknafisk as well as tourism.

== See also ==
- List of islands of Norway
