= Skorpa, Troms =

Island in Norway

Skorpa (Norwegian) Skárfu (Northern Sami)
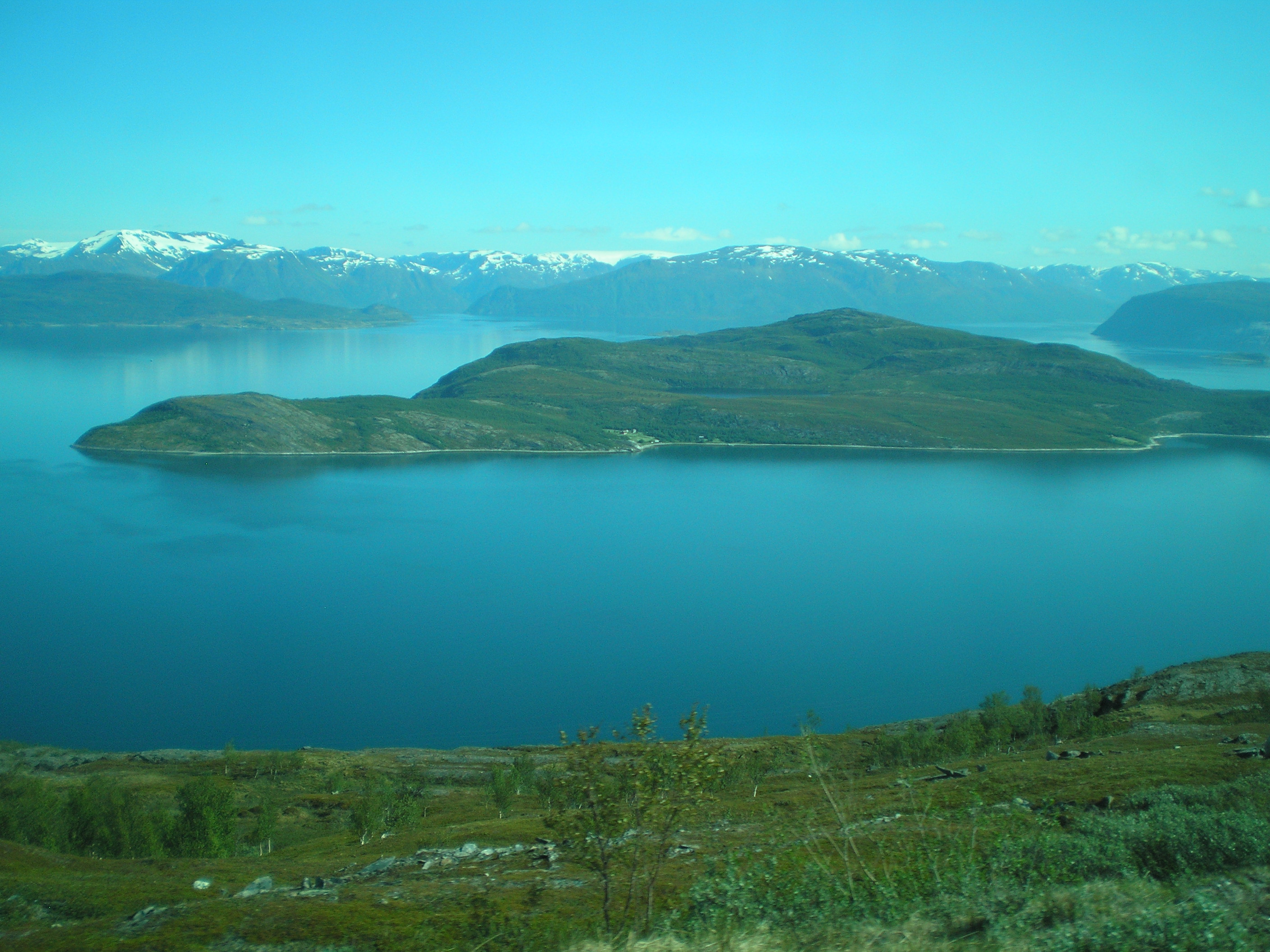
- View of Skorpa
- Interactive map of Skorpa (Norwegian); Skárfu (Northern Sami)

Geography
- Location: Troms, Norway
- Coordinates: 69.9317°N 21.6899°E
- Area: 8.26 km^{2} (3.19 sq mi)
- Highest elevation: 307 m (1007 ft)
- Highest point: Varden

Administration
- Norway
- County: Troms
- Municipality: Kvænangen Municipality

Demographics
- Population: 0 (2018)

Skorpa (Norwegian) or Skárfu (Northern Sami) is an uninhabited island in Kvænangen Municipality in Troms county, Norway. The 8.26-square-kilometre (3.19 sq mi) island is located in the middle of the Kvænangen fjord, south of the island of Spildra. The last permanent resident of the island moved off the island around 1980, and the island has had no permanent inhabitants since then. It is only accessible by boat.

== History ==
The island was the historical center of the municipality of Kvænangen. The municipal government and Skorpa Church were located on the island. The Skorpa prisoner of war camp was located on the island during World War II. The municipal government moved to Burfjord on the mainland during the 20th century and the island's population continued to decline until around 1980, when the island became uninhabited.

== See also ==
- List of islands of Norway
