= Gunnar Kaasen =

Norwegian-American musher (1882–1960)

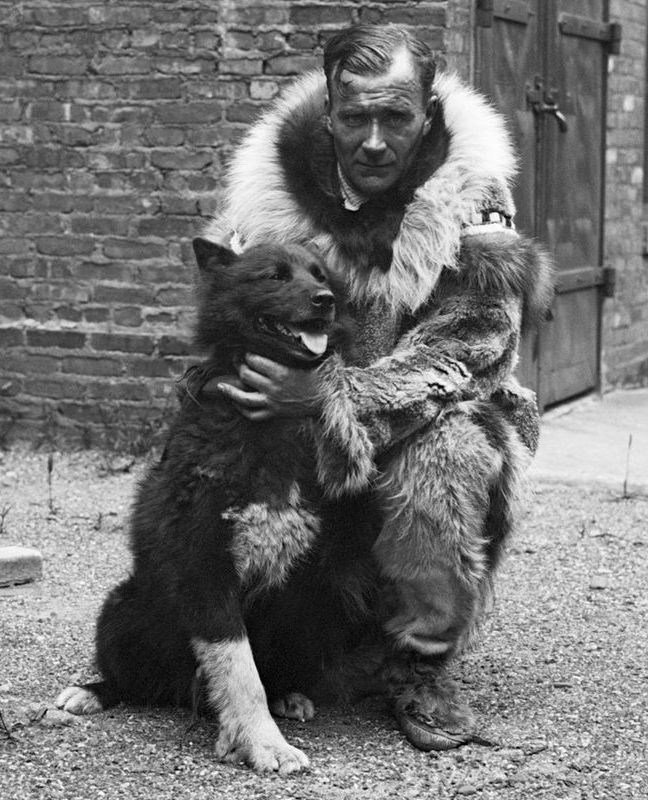
- Gunnar Kaasen with Balto
- Born: March 11, 1882; Burfjord valley, Norway
- Died: November 27, 1960 (aged 78); Everett, Washington, U.S.
- Occupation: Musher

Gunnar Kaasen (March 11, 1882 – November 27, 1960) was a Norwegian-born musher who delivered a cylinder containing 300,000 units of diphtheria antitoxin to Nome, Alaska, in 1925, as the last leg of a dog sled relay that saved the U.S. city from an epidemic.

== Background ==
Gunnar E. Kaasen was born the son of Hans and Anna Kaasen in Burfjorddalen, in Troms county, Norway. He went to the United States to mine for gold in 1903, in the wake of the discovery of gold-bearing sands on Cape Nome in 1898, which triggered one of several gold rushes in the state between 1891 and 1898. Kaasen became an experienced musher and a resident of Nome. While the boom was spent by 1905, the port of Nome sits on Norton Sound, which is usually ice locked and inaccessible by ship between October and June. Dog sledding remained the primary transportation and communication link to the outside world during the winter months.

== Last leg of the Great Race of Mercy ==
In 1925, an outbreak of diphtheria threatened Kaasen's adopted home, and the disease could easily spread across the northern Alaska villages of which Nome was the hub. The Iñupiaq children in particular had no immunity to the "white man's disease". The port was frozen. No train routes or regular roads extended to the northern coast of Alaska.

Bush piloting was in its infancy. The only two aircraft in the state had open-cockpits, and had never been flown in the winter. Given the choices, Governor Scott Bone authorized the transport of 300,000 units of serum in Anchorage to Nenana by train, where it was picked up by the first of twenty mushers and more than one hundred dogs who relayed the serum the remaining 674 miles (1,085 km) to Nome.

Kaasen was scheduled to transport the 20 pound (9 kg) cylinder of serum along the next-to-last leg of the relay, from Bluff to Point Safety, Alaska. At Bluff, Charlie Olson passed the serum to Kaasen, who left with a team of 13 dogs, led by the husky, Balto. Kaasen traveled through the night, in the middle of winds so severe that his sled flipped over and he almost lost the cylinder containing the serum. Visibility was so poor he could not always see the dogs harnessed closest to the sled.

Kaasen reached Port Safety ahead of schedule on February 2, at 2 AM Alaska Standard Time. Ed Rohn, the next musher in the relay, was sleeping, so Kaasen pressed on the remaining 25 miles (40 km) to Nome, reaching Front Street at 5:30 AM. Kaasen traveled a total of 54.3 miles (87 km).

Kaasen gave the serum to Dr. Curtis Welch, the only physician in Nome, who distributed the serum. No further deaths from the disease were reported. A second batch of serum, from Seattle, Washington, arrived in Seward, Alaska, five days later, and was transported to Nome in the same fashion. Prior to 1925, the disease killed 20,000 people a year in the U.S. The worldwide publicity the event received helped spur widespread diphtheria inoculations, which greatly reduced that number.

== Celebrity ==
Like all mushers who participated, Kaasen was given a citation by the Governor of the Alaska Territory. All mushers also received a daily wage from a public fund of between US$30 and $40. H. K. Mulford Company, which manufactured the antitoxin, awarded medals to all participants in the first relay.

Unlike the other mushers, Kaasen became a celebrity. In addition to the medal, the H.K. Mulford Company awarded him $1,000, and he was even offered a role in a movie. Balto became even more famous. On December 17, 1925, a bronze statue of the large black dog was unveiled in Central Park in New York City. Although news sources promoted the idea that this was a statue of Balto, his name does not appear on the dedication plaque, but instead reads, "Dedicated to the indomitable spirit of the sled dogs that relayed antitoxin six hundred miles over rough ice, across treacherous waters, through Arctic blizzards from Nenana to the relief of stricken Nome in the Winter of 1925. Endurance · Fidelity · Intelligence".

Balto appeared in Madison Square Garden before a crowd of 20,000 people. Another statue was erected in downtown Anchorage, Alaska as well, depicting a sled dog in mid-stride, and though most consider this to be another likeness of Balto, the plaque itself, like the NYC statue never mentions the famous dog and instead is dedicated “to all dog mushers and their heroic dogs.”

Kaasen lived in Everett, Washington, from 1952 to 1960. He was 78 when he died of cancer in 1960. He was buried at Everett's Cypress Lawn Memorial Park next to his wife, Anna.

== Other source ==
- Sherwonit, Bill Iditarod: The Great Race to Nome. (Alaska Northwest Books. 1991) ISBN 0-88240-411-3.
- Salisbury, Gay and Laney The Cruelest Miles (W.W. Norton. 2003)
- Murphy, Claire Rudolf and Jane G. Haigh Gold Rush Dogs (Alaska Northwest Books. 2001)
