= Sørstraumen Bridge =

Bridge that crosses the Sørstraumen in the Kvænangen fjord

Sørstraumen Bridge Sørstraumen bru
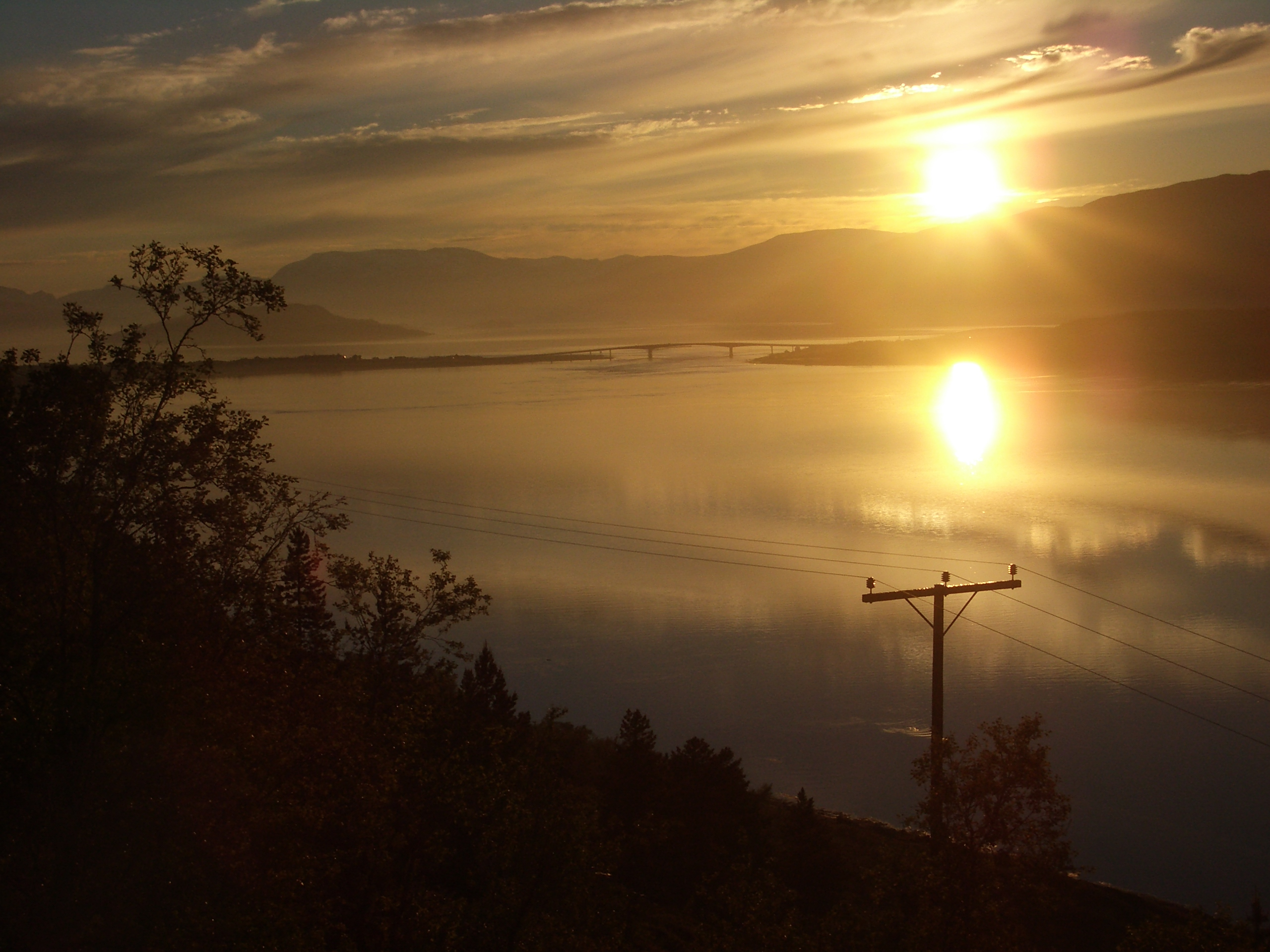
- View of Sørstraumen bridge
- Coordinates: 69.8404°N 21.8843°E
- Carries: E6
- Crosses: Sørstraumen
- Locale: Kvænangen Municipality, Troms, Norway

Characteristics
- Design: Cantilever bridge
- Material: Prestressed concrete
- Total length: 440 m (1,440 ft)
- Longest span: 120 m (390 ft)

History
- Opened: 20 June 1980

Location
- Interactive map of Sørstraumen Bridge

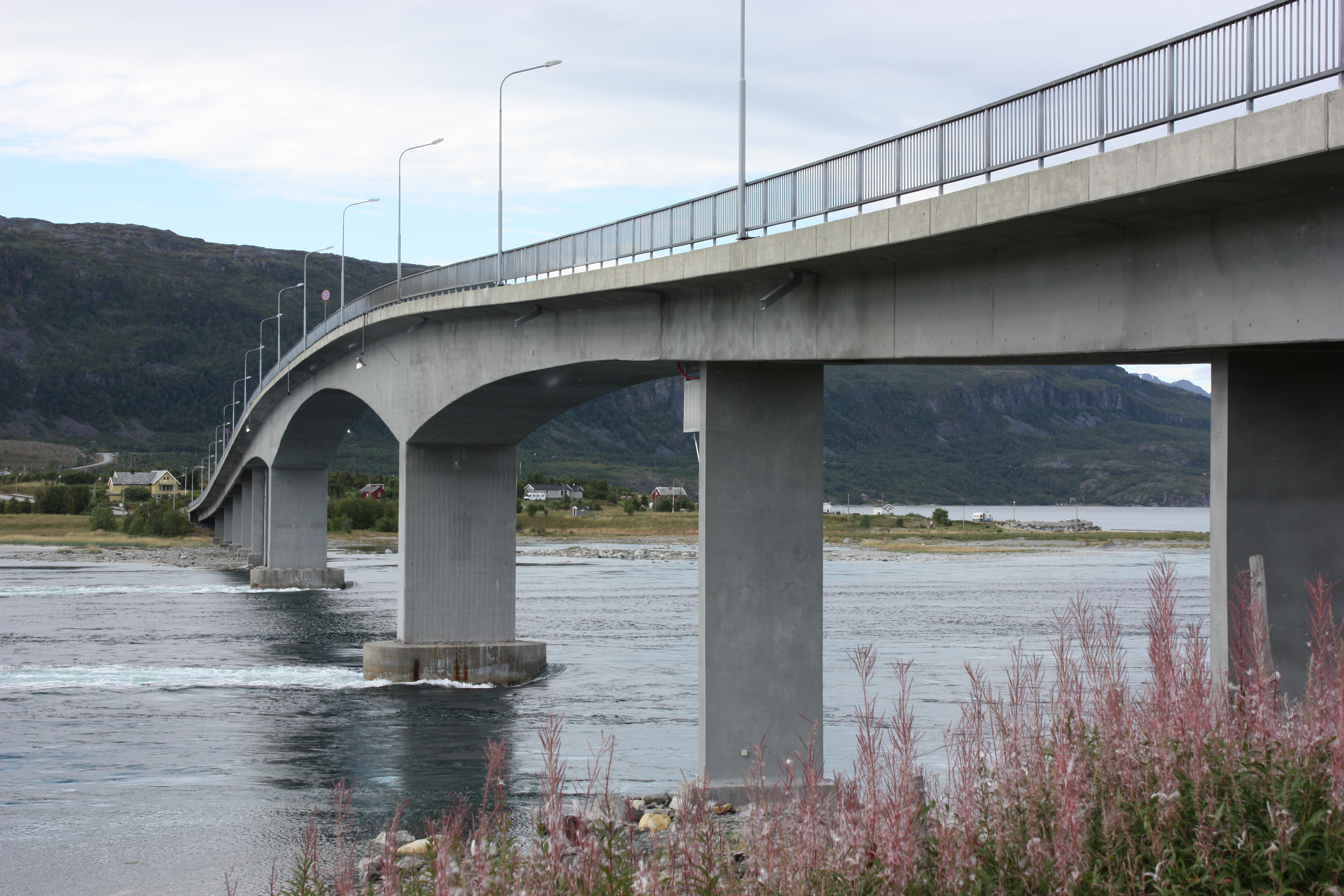
Sørstraumen bru

Sørstraumen Bridge (Norwegian: Sørstraumen bru) is a cantilever bridge that crosses the Sørstraumen in the inner part of the Kvænangen fjord. The bridge lies just west of the village of Sekkemo in Kvænangen Municipality in Troms county, Norway. The 440-metre-long (1,440 ft) bridge has a main span that is 120 metres (390 ft) long. The prestressed concrete bridge is part of the European route E6 highway.

== See also ==
- List of bridges in Norway
- List of bridges in Norway by length
- List of bridges by length
