= Odd Rikard Olsen =

Norwegian newspaper editor and politician

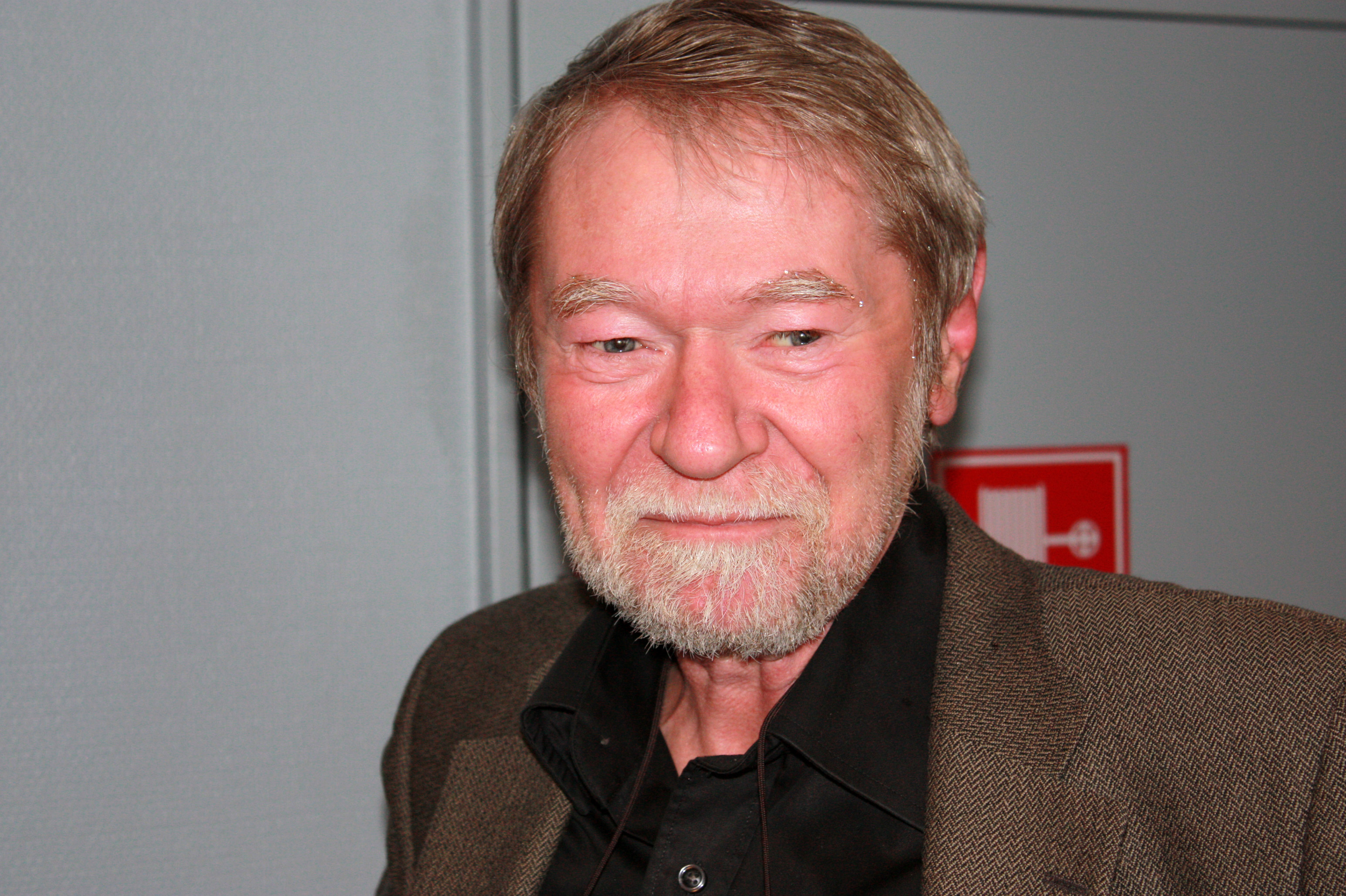

Odd Rikard Olsen (18 June 1947 – 10 April 2012) was a Norwegian newspaper editor and politician for the Conservative Party.

He was born in Tromsø and grew up in Kvænangen Municipality. After the examen artium he started working as an office clerk in Hammerfest in 1968. He was later hired as a journalist in Finnmarksposten, Bladet Tromsø, Aftenposten and the Norwegian Broadcasting Corporation. He was then editor-in-chief of Sør-Varanger Avis from 1982 to 1990 and Harstad Tidende from 1991 to 2004, then political editor in Harstad Tidende from 2004 until his death.

He has been a board member of the Association of Norwegian Editors. In politics, he was a member of Finnmark county council from 1987 to 1990 and State Secretary in the Ministry of Trade and Industry in Syse's Cabinet.

He died in April 2012 in his Harstad home.
