= Kåfjord Copper Works =

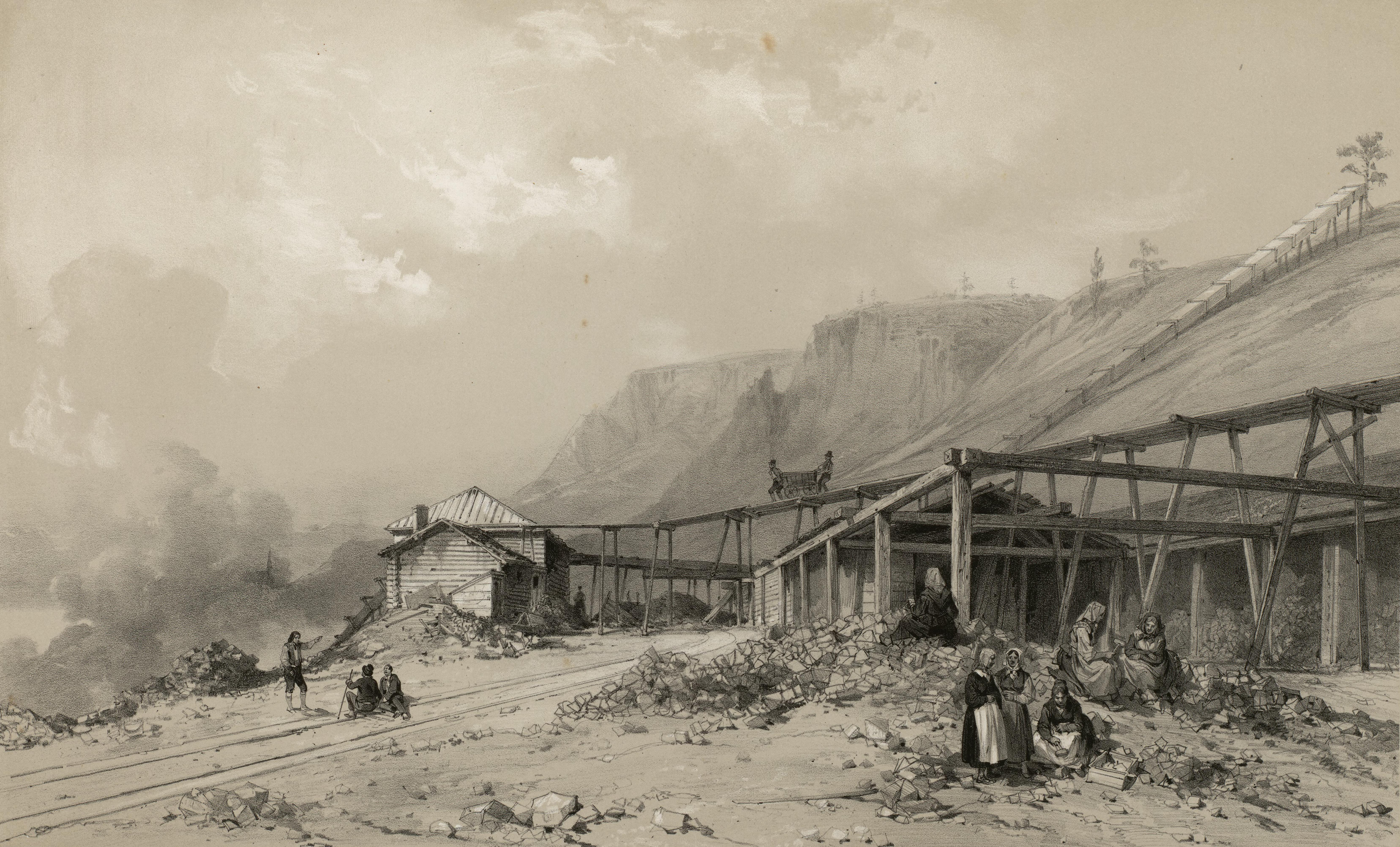
The Alten Copper Works in 1852

The Kåfjord Copper Works (Norwegian: Kåfjord kobberverk, originally the Alten Copper Mines and later the Alten Copper Works) was a company established in 1826 to mine copper in the village of Kåfjord in what is now Alta Municipality in Finnmark county, Norway.

After the discovery of copper ore in the area in the 17th century, exploration for ore started in the 18th century. The copper works in Kåfjord operated from 1826 to 1878 under English owners, and again from 1896 to 1909 under Swedish owners.

== 1826–1878: Alten Copper Mines / Alten Copper Works ==
John Rice Crowe (1795–1877) and Henry Dick Woodfall (1796–1869) founded Alten Copper Mines, probably in 1826, to extract copper ore in the Alta area. Crowe had started trading in Hammerfest around 1820. Crowe and Woodfall both acted as directors of the company in Kåfjord, which changed its name to Alten Copper Works after some time. Operations started in 1826 with 11 workers from the Røros Copper Works.

On May 17th, in 1827, Maret Aslaksdatter from Dullan in Kåfjord signed a contract whereby she transferred to John Rice Crowe the right to extract the copper ore deposits found at Kåfjord. In return, she received 50 våger (about 900 kilograms or 2,000 pounds) of whole-grain rye flour in payment. Some sources also state that she received a small pension paid by the copper works.

John Rice Crowe also had interests in copper works outside of Alta. In 1827, together with merchants from the nearby towns of Hammerfest and Tromsø, he founded the Quenangen Mining Association to start mining in the neighboring parish of Kvænangen in Troms county.

=== Individual mines ===
The "Big Mine" (Storgruva) in Kåfjord, which was located above Strømsnes, was also called the Marit Mine (Maritgruva) in memory of Maret Aslaksdatter. The four other mines that were set up in Kåfjord by 1827 were named after stakeholders in the copper works: the Woodfall Mine (Woodfalls gruve), Crowe Mine (Crowes gruve), Ward Mine (Wards gruve), and Nellen Mine (Nellens gruve). All of these were in the mountains above Kåfjord. The Raipa Mine (Raipas gruve) is located on a ridge known as Lille-Raipas and is believed to have been opened in 1685. Two men from Alta presented two ore samples at a meeting in Sørøya in that year, and the description of the site indicates that the samples came from Raipas. Alten Copper Works operated the mine from 1836 to 1869. The Raipas Mine and the "Old Mine" (Gammelgruva) in Kåfjord were the two most important mines for the copper works in Kåfjord.

=== 1826–1844: The first decades ===
In its first few years, the copper works in Kåfjord was the only one in Norway without its own smelting hut. This is because the owners were uncertain whether the enterprise would pay off at all and therefore would not invest in a smelting hut. Instead, the ore was sent to the United Kingdom for smelting, with the stipulation that the crude material be crushed and carefully sorted in advance so as not to transport too much stone in relation to copper. Initially, the ore was transported by horse from the crushing facility to the harbor, but in 1828 a railway line was built from the crushing facility to the sea. With this, the Alten Copper Works established the northernmost rail line in the world.

Woodfall resigned from his executive position at the Alten Copper Works in 1840. Crowe remained the director until 1844, when his successor Stephen Henry Thomas took over. Unlike Woodfall and Crowe, Thomas had a mining education; he was a chemical engineer and a few years earlier had relocated from Cornwall to become the mining foreman in Kåfjord. Thomas served as the director from 1844 to 1857, and he was the first foreign citizen to be elected to a seat in the Storting.

The Alten Copper Mines was Norway's largest iron and copper works in 1840 by number of employees. At the same time, Kåfjord was the largest settlement in Finnmark. In the 1835 census, Kåfjord had a population of 655, or 388 Norwegians (including Swedes), 253 women, 12 Englishmen, and two Germans. As the co-director of the Alten Copper Works, Woodfall was skeptical of Crowe's proposal to select miners from England to operate the mine in Alta. He worried that imported skilled workers would come into conflict with the Norwegian and Swedish workers. Nonetheless, eight miners were brought in from Cornwall. The English workers had been promised higher wages than the local workers, and when they arrived at Kåfjord they demanded additional wage increases because they felt that the operating conditions were particularly challenging. Woodfall and Crowe eventually concluded that it was too expensive to use English workers, and six of them were returned to Cornwall in September 1827. Suggestions were later made to bring back English professionals, but Woodfall remained opposed to imported labor. Instead, over the years he made several trips to the mines at Røros Municipality and Folldal Municipality to recruit people. He wanted the new workers to bring their wives and children to Kåfjord so that they would settle there permanently. Under these circumstances, the company would also have to pay the travel expenses for the workers' families, but Woodfall considered this a necessary long-term investment to establish a permanent mining community in Kåfjord. In this way, there would be better prospects for the workers to remain in Kåfjord, and the local labor force would increase in the long run. For the same reason, Woodfall primarily wanted to hire workers that had no debt to repay at their previous residence; many people sought work at Kåfjord only to make money to pay off their farms at home and they would return to their farms as soon as they had become debt free. When such workers left Kåfjord, the copper works had to recruit and train new workers, and this limited the effectiveness of its production.

The mining community had its own shop (opened in 1829), school (built in 1829), and church (consecrated in 1837). The workers lived in log houses owned by the company, usually housing one family. Kvens were housed separately at Kreta (Kven: Kreetanpää) at the outflow of the Mathis River into the fjord, where the Kven children also had their own school for a few years. A bridge was built across the Inner Strait (Innerstrømmen) in 1836 so that the Kven would not have to rely on a boat to get to work.

Crowe and Woodfall brought the philanthropic factory tradition from their homeland, which involved not only putting people to work but also ensuring their welfare. They took care of widows of factory workers and their families, and in Kåfjord they built a small industrial community based on the English model with their own homes and a health center for the employees. The factory operated its own grocery store with its own bakery and brewery. There were also free schools, one for the children from Kreta with instruction in Kven, and one in Kåfjord for the Norwegians. In 1861 it was decided in Norway that no one should be taught in Kven. Nonetheless, this was still done in the lower and upper grades.

In the works' civic building, Ultima Thule was founded as the world's northernmost theater company, with seating for 200 people, in 1840. The plays were performed in English, but there was a full house every time a new performance was staged. When Crowe left Kåfjord in 1845, the theater performances ended and the venue was later used as a party venue. The building also contained a library with a reading rooms for the workers, with everything from classical literature to new journals on science and technology.

=== 1844–1878: The last decades ===
The company's new director, Stephen Henry Thomas, joined in 1844. In contemporary documents he is referred to as the manager of the works. He was originally from Cornwall, was educated as a chemical engineer, and had been the mining foreman at the Kåfjord works since the 1830s. He was as involved with his employees as his predecessors Woodfall and Crowe had been. Alta Church was built based on plans that he made, and this is a strong indication that he had designed Kåfjord Church a few years earlier.

However, copper prices fell on the world market, and the Quenangen Mining Association, which had been launched in 1827 by John Rice Crowe, was increasingly experiencing economic problems. At the end of the 1840s, this company sold the mines in Kvænangen to Alten Copper Mines, but the Kvænangen plant remained a separate company until 1857, when the two works were formally merged into one company.

Thomas left Alten Copper Mines in 1857, when he went to Chile to become director general of the Copiapo Smelting Company. The year before, he had become the first foreigner to be elected a representative of the Storting. Activity at the copper works continued to fluctuate in line with international copper prices. In the 1860s prices dropped drastically, and operations at the copper works tapered off. Alten Copper Mines was shut down in 1878.

== 1896–1909: New operation with Swedish owners ==
The company Alten Copper Mines was merged with Sulitjelma Aktiebolag in 1896. The operations in Kåfjord were resumed with Swedish owners under the name Alten Kobbergruver the same year. Then the copper works in Kåfjord were modernized. The smelting hut was torn down and an electric power station was set up on the Møllnes River (Møllneselva) in 1903. In 1909 the mines were exhausted and the operation was found to be unprofitable. Laurits A. Heitmann purchased the works' properties after the closure.

== 1944: Occupation forces burn Kåfjord ==
In the fall of 1944, all of the buildings at the site except for the church were burned during the German retreat.
