= Våg =

A våg (plural våger) or vog is an old Scandinavian unit of mass.

The standardized landsvåg, which was introduced in Norway with the new system of weights and measures in 1875, corresponded to three bismerpund, or 17.932 kilograms (39.53 lb). The våg was used in Eastern Norway, Western Norway, and Northern Norway, but it varied in weight. Previously, it was often reckoned as 72 marks or approximately 18.52 kilograms (40.8 lb). In Sunnmøre the våg was equivalent to three lispund or about 8 kilograms (18 lb), but in Sunnhordland it was reckoned as three spann or 90 marks; that is, about 23.15 kilograms (51.0 lb).
