= Sekkemo =

Village in Kvænangen, Norway

Sekkemo (Norwegian); Hávgemohkki (Northern Sami); Haukkimukka/Säkkimukka (Kven)
- Village
- Interactive map of: Sekkemo (Norwegian); Hávgemohkki (Northern Sami); Haukkimukka/Säkkimukka (Kven)
- Location within Troms Location within Norway
- Coordinates: 69°50′17″N 21°57′24″E
- Country: Norway
- Region: Northern Norway
- County: Troms
- District: Nord-Troms
- Municipality: Kvænangen Municipality
- Elevation: 12 m (39 ft)
- Time zone: UTC+01:00 (CET)
  - Summer (DST): UTC+02:00 (CEST)
- Post Code: 9162 Sørstraumen

Sekkemo (Kven: Haukkimukka or Säkkimukka, Northern Sami: Hávgemohkki) is a village in Kvænangen Municipality in Troms county, Norway. The village is located along the shore of the Kvænangen fjord, about 12 kilometres (7.5 mi) southwest of the municipal centre of Burfjord. European route E6 runs through the village. Sekkemo Church is located here.
