= John Rice Crowe =

English businessman and diplomat

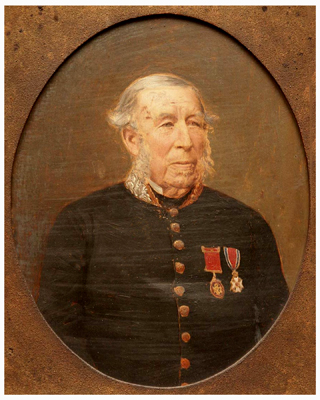
Sir John Rice Crowe

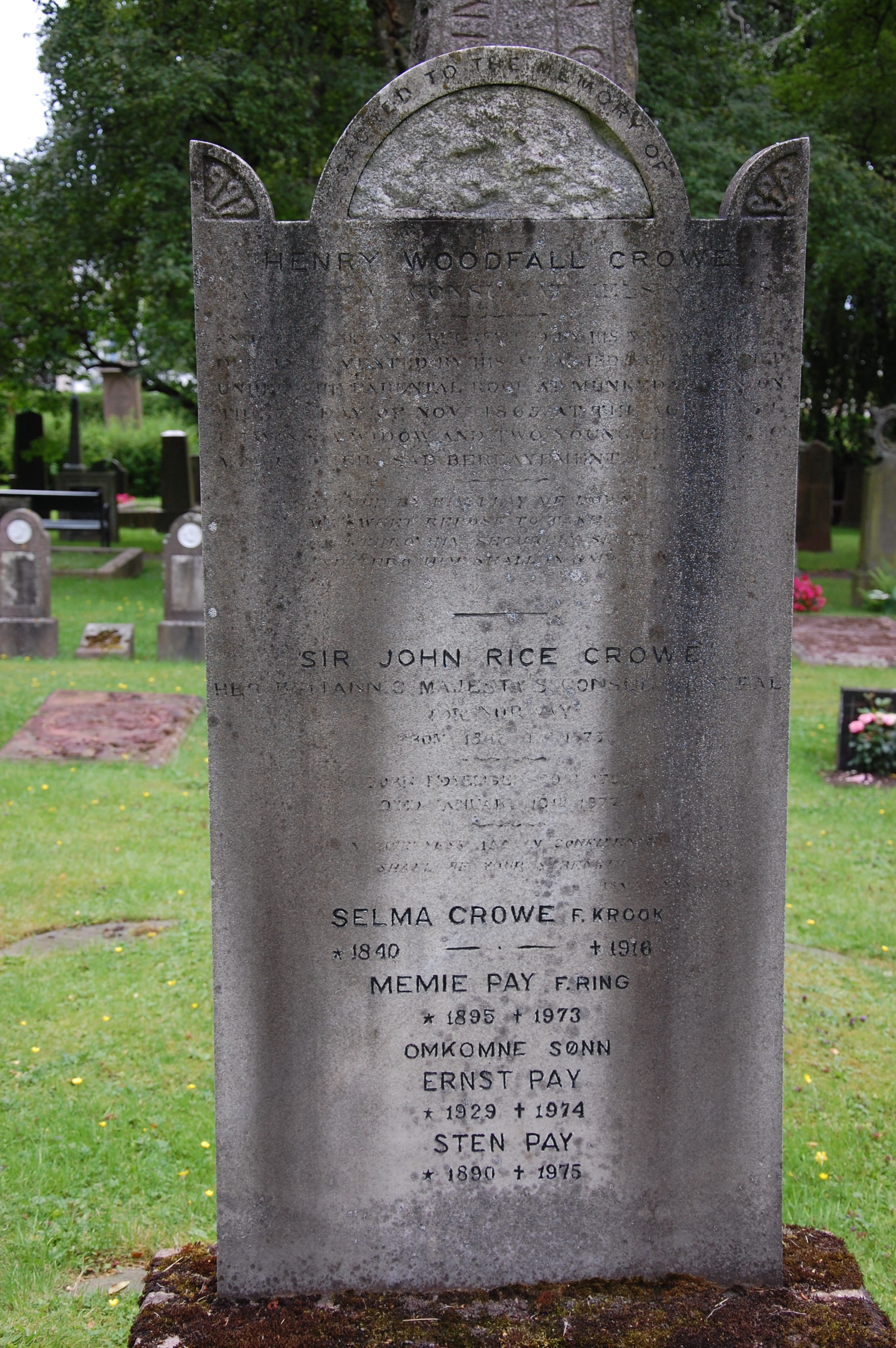
John Rice Crowe's gravestone in Oslo

Sir John Rice Crowe (November 20, 1795 – January 10, 1877) was an English businessman and diplomat who spent much of his life in Norway. He was the British consul-general in Norway, residing in Christiania, from 1843.

Together with Henry Dick Woodfall, John Rice Crowe started the company Alten Copper Works near Alta around 1826. This company was later renamed the Kåfjord Copper Works.

== Diplomat ==
After serving for six years as a British diplomat in Russia, Crowe became the deputy vice-consul in Hammerfest in 1824. Thirteen years later, in 1837, he was appointed British consul in Finnmark, with the requirement to live in Hammerfest. In 1843 he became the general consul for Norway; as such he was the highest British representative in Norway.

== Family ==
Crowe's uncle was an admiral in the English navy. Crowe was married to a Norwegian, Malene Marie Waad (1802–1843).

His daughter Anna Cecilie Crowe (1829–1914) was married to major Norwegian industrialist Halvor Schou. His son Henry Woodfall Crowe was British consul in Helsingfors. His son Septimus Crowe (1842–1903) was British Vice Consul and acting Consul-General in Christiania, but emigrated to Mexico in the 1880s.

== Honours ==
He became a Companion of the British Order of the Bath in 1859 for outstanding service as a diplomat for his homeland. In Norway he became a Commander of the Order of St. Olav. Crowe was knighted by Queen Victoria on 7 July 1874.
