= Burfjord =

Village in Kvænangen, Norway

Burfjord: Burfjord (Norwegian); Burovuonna (Northern Sami); Puruvuono (Kven)
- Village
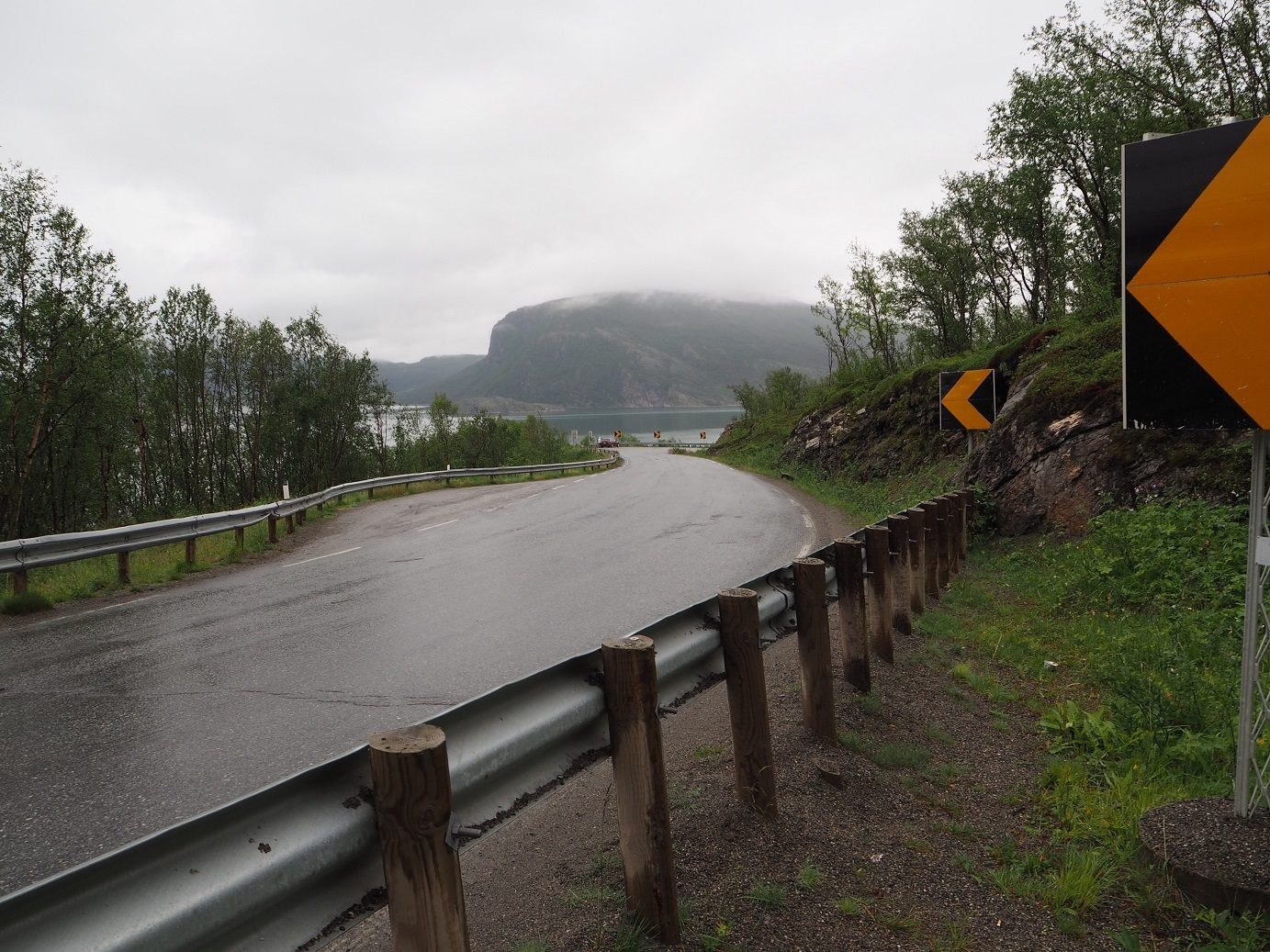
- View of the road near the village
- Interactive map of Burfjord
- Location within Troms Location within Norway
- Coordinates: 69°56′16″N 22°03′07″E
- Country: Norway
- Region: Northern Norway
- County: Troms
- District: Nord-Troms
- Municipality: Kvænangen Municipality

Area
  - Total: 0.59 km^{2} (0.23 sq mi)
- Elevation: 12 m (39 ft)

Population (2023)
  - Total: 390
  - Density: 661/km^{2} (1,710/sq mi)
- Time zone: UTC+01:00 (CET)
  - Summer (DST): UTC+02:00 (CEST)
- Post Code: 9161 Burfjord

Burfjord (Norwegian), Burovuonna (Northern Sami), or Puruvuono (Kven) is a village in Kvænangen Municipality in Troms county, Norway. The village is the administrative centre of the municipality, thus it is where the municipal offices are located and where the municipal council meets. The 0.59-square-kilometre (150-acre) village has a population (2023) of 390 and a population density of 661 inhabitants per square kilometre (1,710/sq mi).

The services of Burfjord include a bank, a post office, a gas station, a medical office, a nursing home, a dentist, a primary school, grocery shops, and Burfjord Church. Burfjord's residents are composed of a mix of indigenous Sami people, Kven people, and ethnic Norwegians. Sami tourist shops selling handicrafts are located all around the village.

== Geography ==
Burfjord lies on the northern border of Troms County, along the busy European route E6 highway that winds its way through this part of Northern Norway. The village is located at the end of the Burfjorden, an arm of the Kvænangen fjord. It is about 50 km (31 mi) straight west of the town of Alta and the Alta Airport.

== History ==
Burfjord's growth as a town is relatively recent. Prior to 1500, the Kvænangen region was almost entirely inhabited by indigenous Sami peoples, who at some point left the traditional nomadic life of reindeer herding atop the mountain plateau and settled to fish and farm as sjøsame (sea-Sami). The first scouts northward from Trondheim found no southern Norwegians living in or around the area. During the early 18th century, Burfjord and the larger Kvænangen region became inhabited by Norwegians from the south who plied their trade fishing and farming, as well by the Kven people and Finns who emigrated from the east. Despite the Kvæns remaining a minority, population-wise, they nevertheless gave Kvænangen its namesake. Kvænangen was originally part of the Skjærvøy parish in northern Troms county. Kvænangen became a separate sub-parish in 1861. It was in the 19th century that Burfjord grew in size and became a more urban village area. Due to its geographically central location, it was chosen as the administrative centre of Kvæanangen Municipality.

== Notable people ==
- Gunnar Kaasen, a Norwegian-born musher who delivered a cylinder containing 300,000 units of diphtheria antitoxin to Nome, Alaska, in 1925
