= Kvænangen Municipality =

Municipality in Troms, Norway

Kvænangen Municipality Kvænangen kommune Návuona suohkan (Northern Sami) Naavuonon komuuni (Kven)
- Municipality
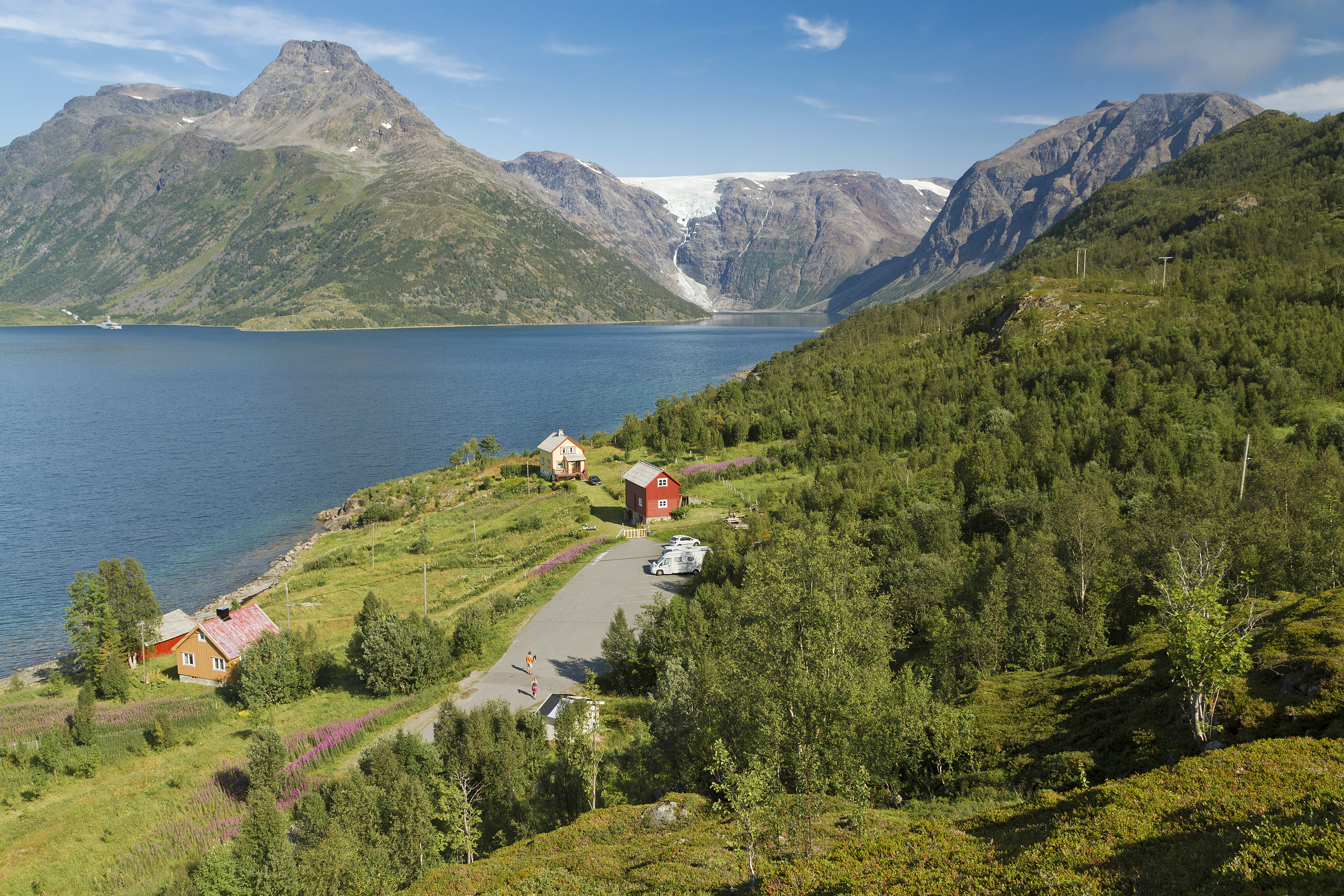
- Isfjordjøkelen, part of Øksfjordjøkelen glacier seen from Varberget

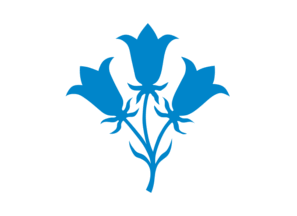
- Flag Coat of arms

- Troms within Norway

- Kvænangen within Troms
- Coordinates: 69°53′39″N 21°58′49″E
- Country: Norway
- County: Troms
- District: Nord-Troms
- Established: 1863
  - Preceded by: Skjervøy Municipality
- Administrative centre: Burfjord

Government
  - Mayor (2023): Kai Petter Johansen (SV)

Area
  - Total: 2,109.68 km^{2} (814.55 sq mi)
  - Land: 2,007.72 km^{2} (775.19 sq mi)
  - Water: 101.96 km^{2} (39.37 sq mi) 4.8%
  - Rank: #32 in Norway
- Highest elevation: 1,324 m (4,344 ft)

Population (2024)
  - Total: 1,157
  - Rank: #324 in Norway
  - Density: 0.5/km^{2} (1.3/sq mi)
  - Change (10 years): ▼ −6.2%
- Demonym: Kvænangsværing

Official language
  - Norwegian form: Neutral
- Time zone: UTC+01:00 (CET)
  - Summer (DST): UTC+02:00 (CEST)
- ISO 3166 code: NO-5546
- Website: Official website

Kvænangen (Northern Sami: Návuotna; Kven: Naavuono) is a municipality in Troms county, Norway. The administrative centre of the municipality is the village of Burfjord. Other notable villages in the municipality include Alteidet, Badderen, Kjækan, and Sekkemo. The European route E6 highway goes through the municipality and over the Sørstraumen Bridge, and many people stop at the Kvænangsfjellet pass to view the scenery of the Kvænangen fjord.

The 2,109-square-kilometre (814 sq mi) municipality is the 32nd largest by area out of the 356 municipalities in Norway. Kvænangen is the 324th most populous municipality in Norway with a population of 1,157. The municipality's population density is 0.5 inhabitants per square kilometre (1.3/sq mi) and its population has decreased by 6.2% over the previous 10-year period.

== General information ==
The parish of Kvænangen was established as a municipality in 1863 when it was separated from the large Skjervøy Municipality. The initial population of Kvænangen was 1,677. During the 1960s, there were many municipal mergers across Norway due to the work of the Schei Committee. On 1 January 1965, the Meiland area (population: 12) of Skjervøy Municipality was transferred to Kvænangen. On 1 January 1972, the uninhabited area of Mannskarvik was transferred from Skjervøy to Kvænanagen.

On 1 January 2020, the municipality became part of the newly formed Troms og Finnmark county. Previously, it had been part of the old Troms county. On 1 January 2024, the Troms og Finnmark county was divided and the municipality once again became part of Troms county.

=== Name ===
The municipality (originally the parish) is named after the local Kvænangen fjord (Old Norse: Kven(a)angr) since the fjord is the central geographic feature for the municipality. The first element kven is the plural genitive case of the name of the Kven people who at one time were the majority of the local residents. The last element is angr which means "fjord".

=== Coat of arms ===
The coat of arms was granted on 13 July 1990. The official blazon is "Argent, a harebell plant azure" (Norwegian: I sølv en blå blåklokkeplante). This means the arms have a field (background) with a tincture of argent which means it is commonly colored white, but if it is made out of metal, then silver is used. The charge is a harebell plant that has a tincture of azure. The plant is a typical plant for the area with its harsh and cold climate. The arms were designed by Arvid Sveen.

=== Churches ===
The Church of Norway has one parish (sokn) within Kvænangen Municipality. It is part of the Nord-Troms prosti (deanery) in the Diocese of Nord-Hålogaland.

Churches in Kvænangen Municipality
Parish (sokn)	Church name	Location of the church	Year built
Kvænangen	Burfjord Church	Burfjord	2009
Kvænangen	Sekkemo Church	Sekkemo	1956
Kvænangen	Skorpa Church	Skorpa	1850

== History ==
The municipality surrounds the Kvænangen fjord, after which it is named. The population is primarily of Sami origin, although the Kven population constitutes a sizeable minority. Archeological finds indicate nomadic activity in the area going back 10,000 years.

There is evidence that Kværnangen was the site for a transitional state between nomadic and agricultural society through what was known as "siida" - delimited areas where permanent housing was established and natural resources put under stewardship.

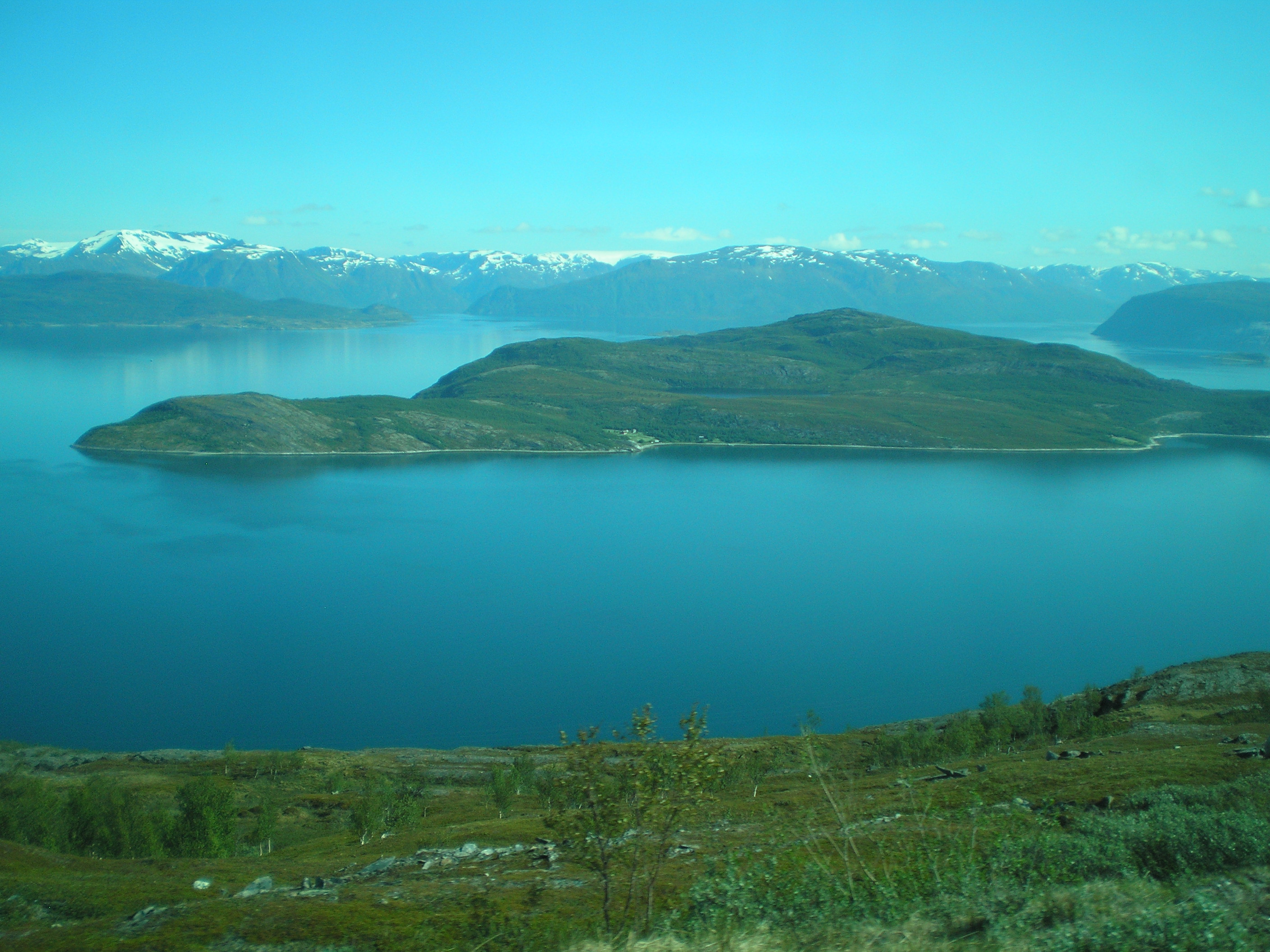
Skorpa island in Kvænangsfjord

The Kvens settled in the area in the 18th century, occupying themselves with fishing, hunting, and agriculture. Over time, fisheries became a primary industry, and the community exported dried fish to southern areas. Ethnic Norwegians gradually immigrated to facilitate trade and administration.

Norwegian public policy in the 1930s and post-war years homogenized the three groups, ethnic Norwegians, Sami, and Kven, considerably, to the point that most residents speak Norwegian at home, regardless of their ethnic heritage. A majority of people in Kvænangen declared themselves Sami or Kven in the 1930 census. In the 1950 census, all but a handful declared themselves Norwegian.

During the Nazi occupation during World War II, a temporary work camp was established at Kvænangen. In large part due to the generosity of the local population, prisoners had ample food. As the German Wehrmacht retreated in early 1945, the population was evacuated by force, and all buildings were burned. Today, a local museum shows typical reconstruction houses.

== Geography ==
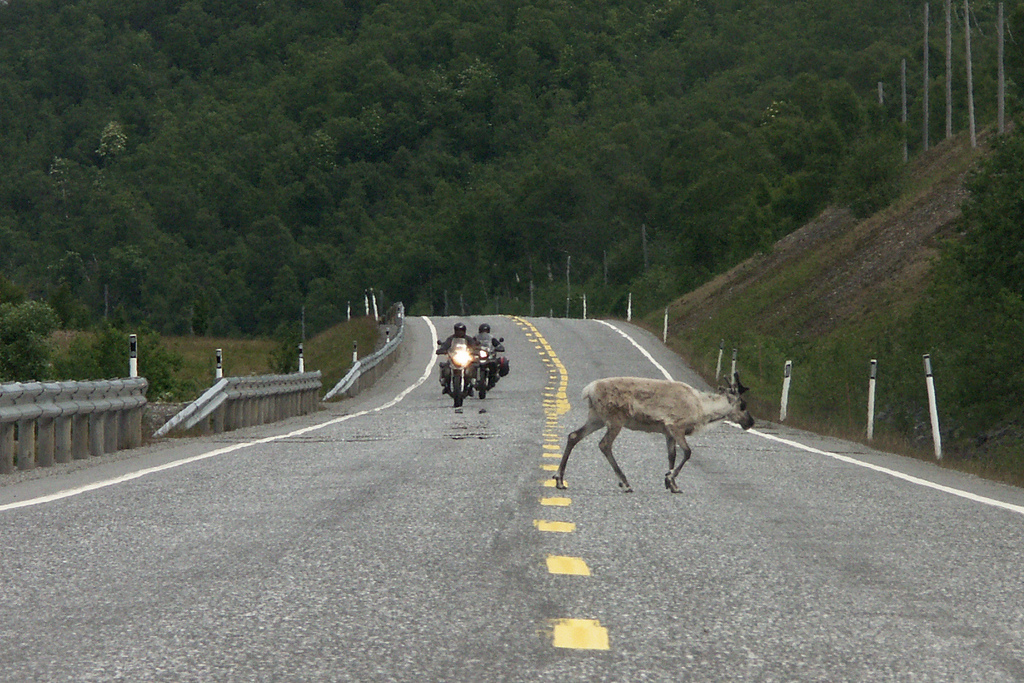
The main E6 road goes through Kvænangen

The municipality has coastal and plains geography, extending into Finnmarksvidda. There are mature pine forests in the valley at the head of the fjord, and there are several rivers, the largest of which is Kvænangselva, which is traditionally a good salmon-fishing river.

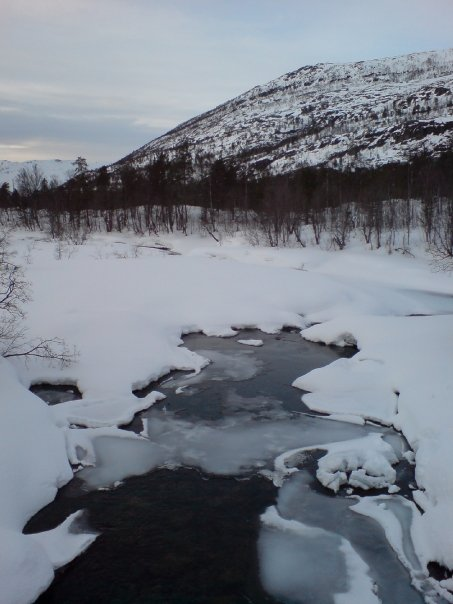
Winter in Burfjord valley, Kvænangen.

The Øksfjordjøkelen glacier is located in the northern part of the municipality along the border with Loppa Municipality. It's the ninth largest glacier in mainland Norway. The lake Šuoikkatjávri is located in the southern part of the municipality on the border with Kautokeino Municipality. The Langfjordjøkelen is another glacier in northern Kvænangen. The highest point in the municipality is the 1,324-metre (4,344 ft) tall mountain Beahcegealháldi.

There are several islands in the fjord that are part of Kvænangen Municipality: Skorpa, Spildra, and Nøklan.

=== Climate ===
Kvænangen has a boreal climate with mild winters for this climate type, and very moderate precipitation with little variation between the seasons. The Köppen Climate Classification subtype for this climate is "Dfc" (continental subarctic climate). The average temperature for the year is 3.7 °C (38.7 °F). The all-time high temperature is 30.5 °C (86.9 °F) recorded 7 July 2021; the all-time low is −21.5 °C (−6.7 °F) recorded 6 February 2012. There are an average of 101 days of precipitation each year, with the most precipitation days occurring in autumn and the least precipitation occurring in spring. The Norwegian Meteorological Institute has been operating a weather station in Nordstraum in Kvænangen since 1965.

Climate data for Nordstraum in Kvænangen 1991-2020 (20 m)
Month	Jan	Feb	Mar	Apr	May	Jun	Jul	Aug	Sep	Oct	Nov	Dec	Year
Mean daily maximum °C (°F)	−0.5 (31.1)	−1 (30)	0.8 (33.4)	4.2 (39.6)	8.9 (48.0)	12.9 (55.2)	16.2 (61.2)	15.2 (59.4)	11.4 (52.5)	5.9 (42.6)	2.6 (36.7)	0.9 (33.6)	6.5 (43.6)
Daily mean °C (°F)	−3.2 (26.2)	−3.6 (25.5)	−1.8 (28.8)	1.4 (34.5)	5.8 (42.4)	9.8 (49.6)	12.9 (55.2)	12 (54)	8.5 (47.3)	3.6 (38.5)	0.3 (32.5)	−1.7 (28.9)	3.7 (38.7)
Mean daily minimum °C (°F)	−5.6 (21.9)	−6.1 (21.0)	−4.3 (24.3)	−1.2 (29.8)	2.9 (37.2)	6.9 (44.4)	9.9 (49.8)	9.2 (48.6)	6.2 (43.2)	1.7 (35.1)	−1.8 (28.8)	−3.9 (25.0)	1.2 (34.1)
Average precipitation mm (inches)	46.6 (1.83)	32 (1.3)	37 (1.5)	26.1 (1.03)	28.1 (1.11)	39.1 (1.54)	48.8 (1.92)	55.1 (2.17)	47 (1.9)	51.7 (2.04)	34.9 (1.37)	42.7 (1.68)	489.1 (19.39)
Average precipitation days (≥ 1.0 mm)	9	7	9	7	7	8	9	9	10	10	7	9	101
Source 1: seklima.met.no
Source 2: NOAA-WMO averages 91-2020 Norway

Climate data for Kvænangen 1961-1990
Month	Jan	Feb	Mar	Apr	May	Jun	Jul	Aug	Sep	Oct	Nov	Dec	Year
Mean daily maximum °C (°F)	−2.2 (28.0)	−1.8 (28.8)	−0.1 (31.8)	2.9 (37.2)	7.6 (45.7)	12.5 (54.5)	15.5 (59.9)	14.2 (57.6)	9.9 (49.8)	4.9 (40.8)	1.4 (34.5)	−0.8 (30.6)	5.3 (41.5)
Daily mean °C (°F)	−4.6 (23.7)	−4.5 (23.9)	−3 (27)	0.3 (32.5)	4.8 (40.6)	9 (48)	12.1 (53.8)	11.3 (52.3)	7.5 (45.5)	3.2 (37.8)	−0.8 (30.6)	−3.3 (26.1)	2.7 (36.9)
Mean daily minimum °C (°F)	−7.5 (18.5)	−7.1 (19.2)	−5.1 (22.8)	−2.1 (28.2)	2.1 (35.8)	6.4 (43.5)	9.3 (48.7)	8.5 (47.3)	5.1 (41.2)	0.8 (33.4)	−3.1 (26.4)	−5.7 (21.7)	0.1 (32.2)
Average precipitation mm (inches)	36 (1.4)	32 (1.3)	32 (1.3)	23 (0.9)	24 (0.9)	31 (1.2)	52 (2.0)	51 (2.0)	44 (1.7)	54 (2.1)	40 (1.6)	41 (1.6)	460 (18.1)
Average precipitation days	7.4	7.2	6.3	5.9	6.5	7.5	9.9	9.6	9.9	10.9	9.1	9.1	99.3
Mean daily daylight hours	1	8.6	12.8	19.5	23.5	24	23.6	21	14.3	9.9	4	1	13.6
Source: Weatherbase

== Government ==
Kvænangen Municipality is responsible for primary education (through 10th grade), outpatient health services, senior citizen services, welfare and other social services, zoning, economic development, and municipal roads and utilities. The municipality is governed by a municipal council of directly elected representatives. The mayor is indirectly elected by a vote of the municipal council. The municipality is under the jurisdiction of the Vestre Finnmark District Court and the Hålogaland Court of Appeal.

=== Municipal council ===
The municipal council (Kommunestyre) of Kvænangen Municipality is made up of 15 representatives that are elected every four years. The tables below show the current and historical composition of the council by political party.

Kvænangen kommunestyre 2023–2027
Party name (in Norwegian)	Number of representatives
Labour Party (Arbeiderpartiet)	3
Progress Party (Fremskrittspartiet)	1
Conservative Party (Høyre)	2
Centre Party (Senterpartiet)	2
Socialist Left Party (Sosialistisk Venstreparti)	4
Kvænangen Local List (Kvænangen Bygdeliste)	3
Total number of members:	15

Kvænangen kommunestyre 2019–2023
Party name (in Norwegian)	Number of representatives
Labour Party (Arbeiderpartiet)	6
Centre Party (Senterpartiet)	3
Socialist Left Party (Sosialistisk Venstreparti)	2
Joint list of the Conservative Party (Høyre) and the Progress Party (Fremskrittspartiet)	2
Kvænangen Local List (Kvænangen Bygdeliste)	2
Total number of members:	15

Kvænangen kommunestyre 2015–2019
Party name (in Norwegian)	Number of representatives
Labour Party (Arbeiderpartiet)	6
Progress Party (Fremskrittspartiet)	1
Conservative Party (Høyre)	2
Coastal Party (Kystpartiet)	5
Socialist Left Party (Sosialistisk Venstreparti)	1
Total number of members:	15

Kvænangen kommunestyre 2011–2015
Party name (in Norwegian)	Number of representatives
Labour Party (Arbeiderpartiet)	3
Progress Party (Fremskrittspartiet)	1
Conservative Party (Høyre)	5
Coastal Party (Kystpartiet)	5
Socialist Left Party (Sosialistisk Venstreparti)	1
Total number of members:	15

Kvænangen kommunestyre 2007–2011
Party name (in Norwegian)	Number of representatives
Labour Party (Arbeiderpartiet)	5
Progress Party (Fremskrittspartiet)	1
Coastal Party (Kystpartiet)	2
Socialist Left Party (Sosialistisk Venstreparti)	2
Joint list of the Conservative Party (Høyre) and Christian Democratic Party (Kristelig Folkeparti)	5
Total number of members:	15

Kvænangen kommunestyre 2003–2007
Party name (in Norwegian)	Number of representatives
Labour Party (Arbeiderpartiet)	5
Progress Party (Fremskrittspartiet)	2
Centre Party (Senterpartiet)	1
Socialist Left Party (Sosialistisk Venstreparti)	3
Joint list of the Conservative Party (Høyre) and Christian Democratic Party (Kristelig Folkeparti)	6
Total number of members:	17

Kvænangen kommunestyre 1999–2003
Party name (in Norwegian)	Number of representatives
Labour Party (Arbeiderpartiet)	4
Progress Party (Fremskrittspartiet)	2
Centre Party (Senterpartiet)	1
Socialist Left Party (Sosialistisk Venstreparti)	1
Joint list of the Conservative Party (Høyre) and Christian Democratic Party (Kristelig Folkeparti)	9
Total number of members:	17

Kvænangen kommunestyre 1995–1999
Party name (in Norwegian)	Number of representatives
Labour Party (Arbeiderpartiet)	7
Centre Party (Senterpartiet)	2
Socialist Left Party (Sosialistisk Venstreparti)	3
Joint list of the Conservative Party (Høyre) and Christian Democratic Party (Kristelig Folkeparti)	9
Total number of members:	21

Kvænangen kommunestyre 1991–1995
Party name (in Norwegian)	Number of representatives
Labour Party (Arbeiderpartiet)	8
Conservative Party (Høyre)	5
Christian Democratic Party (Kristelig Folkeparti)	3
Socialist Left Party (Sosialistisk Venstreparti)	3
Kvænangen cross-party list (Kvænangen tverrpolitiske liste)	1
Jøkelfjord local list (Jøkelfjord kretsliste)	1
Total number of members:	21

Kvænangen kommunestyre 1987–1991
Party name (in Norwegian)	Number of representatives
Labour Party (Arbeiderpartiet)	9
Conservative Party (Høyre)	6
Christian Democratic Party (Kristelig Folkeparti)	2
Socialist Left Party (Sosialistisk Venstreparti)	2
Jøkelfjord local list (Jøkelfjord kretsliste)	2
Total number of members:	21

Kvænangen kommunestyre 1983–1987
Party name (in Norwegian)	Number of representatives
Labour Party (Arbeiderpartiet)	10
Conservative Party (Høyre)	7
Christian Democratic Party (Kristelig Folkeparti)	3
Socialist Left Party (Sosialistisk Venstreparti)	1
Total number of members:	21

Kvænangen kommunestyre 1979–1983
Party name (in Norwegian)	Number of representatives
Labour Party (Arbeiderpartiet)	8
Conservative Party (Høyre)	5
Christian Democratic Party (Kristelig Folkeparti)	4
Socialist Left Party (Sosialistisk Venstreparti)	1
Joint list of the Centre Party (Senterpartiet) and the Liberal Party (Venstre)	1
Alteidet and Jøkelfjord local list (Alteidet og Jøkelfjord Kretsliste)	1
Burfjord local list (Burfjord Kretsliste)	1
Total number of members:	21

Kvænangen kommunestyre 1975–1979
Party name (in Norwegian)	Number of representatives
Labour Party (Arbeiderpartiet)	7
Conservative Party (Høyre)	4
Christian Democratic Party (Kristelig Folkeparti)	4
Centre Party (Senterpartiet)	1
Alteidet and Jøkelfjord local list (Alteidet og Jøkelfjord Kretsliste)	3
Workers', farmers' and housewives' non-party common list (Arbeidernes, Småbrukernes og Husmødrenes Upolitiske Fellesliste)	1
Kvænangsbotn Non-party district list (Kvænangsbotn Upolitiske distriktsliste)	1
Total number of members:	21

Kvænangen kommunestyre 1971–1975
Party name (in Norwegian)	Number of representatives
Labour Party (Arbeiderpartiet)	7
Liberal Party (Venstre)	1
Local List(s) (Lokale lister)	13
Total number of members:	21

Kvænangen kommunestyre 1967–1971
Party name (in Norwegian)	Number of representatives
Labour Party (Arbeiderpartiet)	10
Conservative Party (Høyre)	5
Socialist People's Party (Sosialistisk Folkeparti)	3
Liberal Party (Venstre)	2
Local List(s) (Lokale lister)	1
Total number of members:	21

Kvænangen kommunestyre 1963–1967
Party name (in Norwegian)	Number of representatives
Labour Party (Arbeiderpartiet)	9
Christian Democratic Party (Kristelig Folkeparti)	3
Socialist People's Party (Sosialistisk Folkeparti)	2
Local List(s) (Lokale lister)	7
Total number of members:	21

Kvænangen herredsstyre 1959–1963
Party name (in Norwegian)	Number of representatives
Labour Party (Arbeiderpartiet)	7
List of workers, fishermen, and small farmholders (Arbeidere, fiskere, småbrukere liste)	5
Local List(s) (Lokale lister)	9
Total number of members:	21

Kvænangen herredsstyre 1955–1959
Party name (in Norwegian)	Number of representatives
Labour Party (Arbeiderpartiet)	11
Liberal Party (Venstre)	4
Local List(s) (Lokale lister)	6
Total number of members:	21

Kvænangen herredsstyre 1951–1955
Party name (in Norwegian)	Number of representatives
Labour Party (Arbeiderpartiet)	3
Liberal Party (Venstre)	5
List of workers, fishermen, and small farmholders (Arbeidere, fiskere, småbrukere liste)	5
Local List(s) (Lokale lister)	3
Total number of members:	16

Kvænangen herredsstyre 1947–1951
Party name (in Norwegian)	Number of representatives
Labour Party (Arbeiderpartiet)	10
Joint List(s) of Non-Socialist Parties (Borgerlige Felleslister)	5
Local List(s) (Lokale lister)	1
Total number of members:	16

Kvænangen herredsstyre 1945–1947
Party name (in Norwegian)	Number of representatives
Labour Party (Arbeiderpartiet)	10
Local List(s) (Lokale lister)	6
Total number of members:	16

Kvænangen herredsstyre 1937–1941*
Party name (in Norwegian)	Number of representatives
Labour Party (Arbeiderpartiet)	7
List of workers, fishermen, and small farmholders (Arbeidere, fiskere, småbrukere liste)	5
Joint List(s) of Non-Socialist Parties (Borgerlige Felleslister)	2
Local List(s) (Lokale lister)	2
Total number of members:	16
Note: Due to the German occupation of Norway during World War II, no elections were held for new municipal councils until after the war ended in 1945.

=== Mayors ===
The mayor (Norwegian: ordfører) of Kvænangen Municipality is the political leader of the municipality and the chairperson of the municipal council. Here is a list of people who have held this position:

- 1863–1888: Peder B. Giæver (H)
- 1889–1910: Henrik Giæver (H)
- 1911–1916: Gjert Rasch (H)
- 1917–1919: Johan Storvik (LL)
- 1920–1925: Gjert Rasch (H)
- 1926–1928: Lars Larsen Vassnes (H)
- 1929–1934: Johan Storvik (Ap)
- 1935–1937: Eli Vassnes
- 1938–1942: Øivind Storvik (Ap)
- 1943–1944: Reidar Paulsen (NS)
- 1945–1947: Peder Olsen (V)
- 1948–1951: Hedley Kristiansen (Ap)
- 1952–1955: Peder Olsen (V)
- 1956–1959: Hedley Kristiansen (Ap)
- 1958–1959: Einar Eriksen (Ap)
- 1960–1963: Kristoffer Borkenhagen (Ap)
- 1964–1965: Kristian Kjelsberg (Ap)
- 1965–1971: Kristoffer Borkenhagen (Ap)
- 1972–1975: Odd Følstad (Ap)
- 1976–1979: Ingulv Wiik (H)
- 1979–1979: Øivind Eilertsen (H)
- 1980–1983: Harald Olsen (H)
- 1984–1991: Sigvald Johnsen (Ap)
- 1992–1995: Eva Jørstad (Ap)
- 1995–2007: Harald Olsen (H)
- 2007–2011: John Helland (H)
- 2011–2015: Jan Helge Jensen (K)
- 2015–2023: Eirik Losnegaard Mevik (Ap)
- 2023–present: Kai Petter Johansen (SV)

== Notable people ==
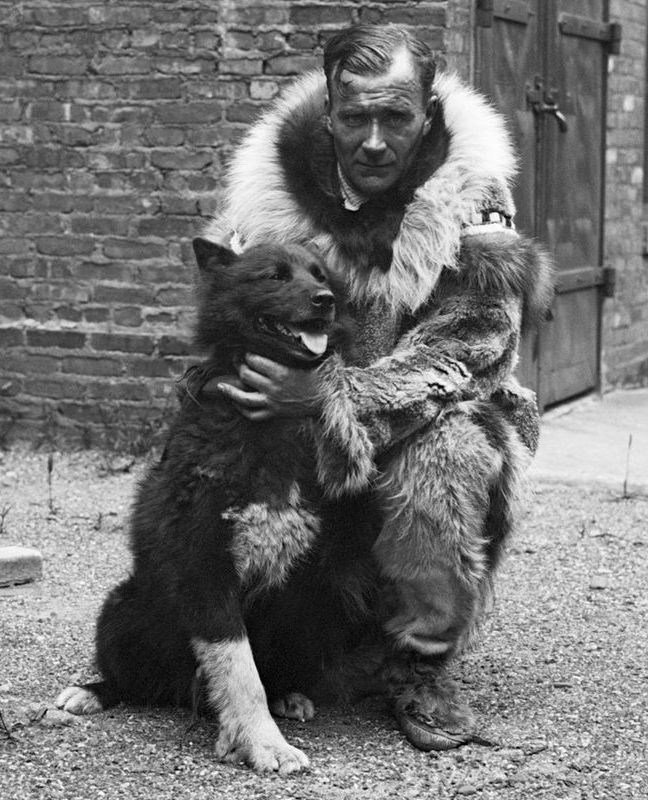
Gunnar Kaasen with Balto, 1925

Notable people that were born or lived in Kvænangen include:

- Anders Larsen (1870–1949), Sami teacher, journalist and author
- Jafet Lindeberg (1873–1962), a gold prospector and co-founder of Nome, Alaska
- Gunnar Kaasen (1882–1960), Norwegian-American musher, helped the 1925 serum run to Nome
- Hans Eng (1907–1995) a Norwegian physician and Nazi collaborator during World War II
- Steinar Eriksen (born 1939), Norwegian businessperson and politician
- Odd Rikard Olsen (1947–2012), Norwegian newspaper editor and politician
- Eva M. Nielsen (born 1950), Norwegian politician
- Torgeir Johnsen, (Norwegian Wiki) (born 1967), Norwegian politician
