= Kvænangen (fjord) =

Fjord in Troms county, Norway

Kvænangen (Norwegian)
- Návuotna (Northern Sami); Naavuono (Kven)
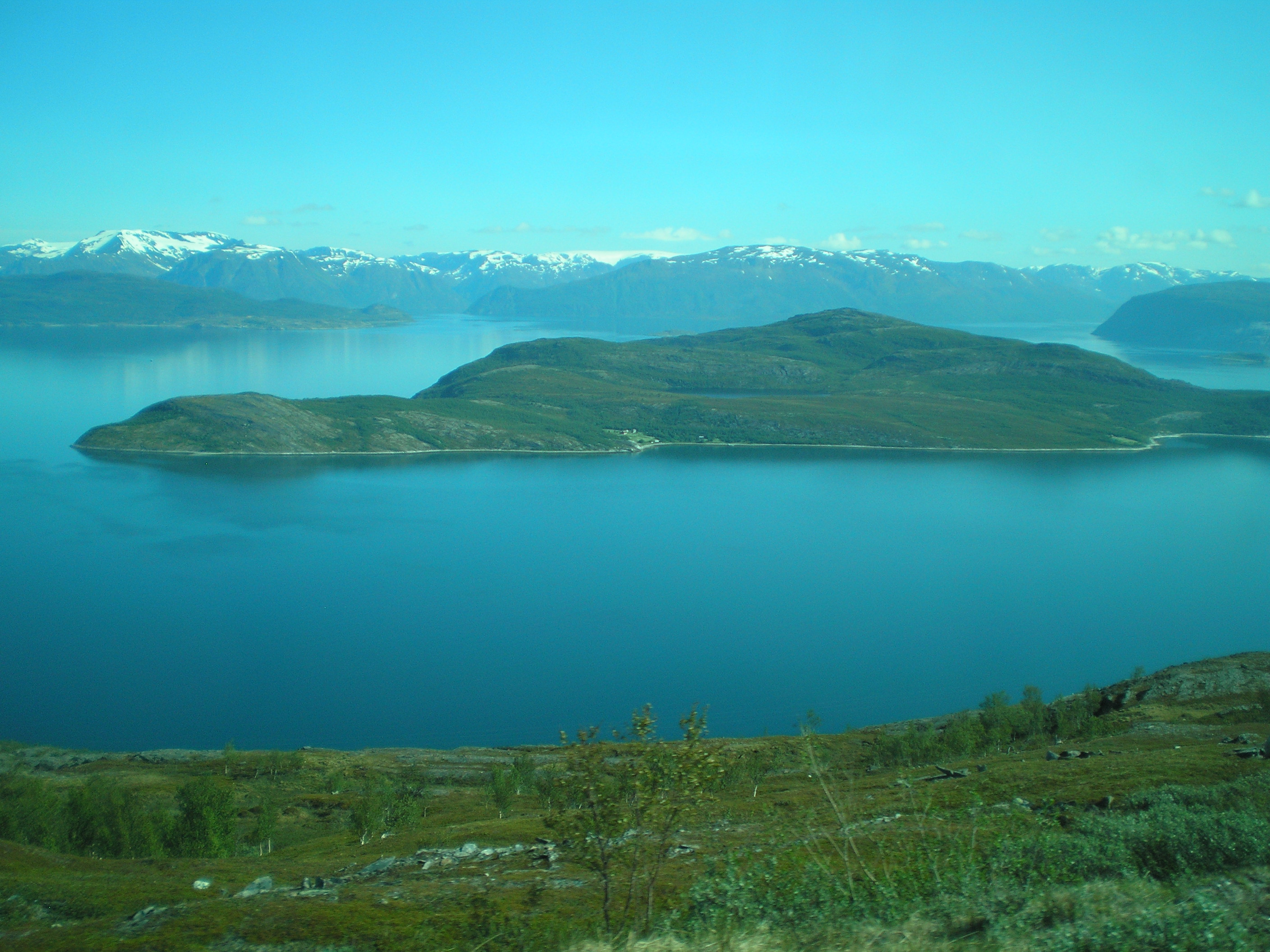
- View of the fjord
- Interactive map of the fjord
- Location: Troms county, Norway
- Coordinates: 69.7462°N 22.0883°E
- Type: Fjord
- Basin countries: Norway
- Max. length: 15 kilometres (9.3 mi)

Kvænangen (Norwegian), Návuotna (Northern Sami), or Naavuono (Kven) (sometimes anglicized as the Kvænang Fjord) is a fjord in Troms county, Norway. The fjord runs through Skjervøy Municipality and Kvænangen Municipality.

== Geography ==
The 72-kilometre (45 mi) long fjord stretches from the Norwegian Sea to the village of Kvænangsbotn. The Reisafjorden is a large fjord which branches off the Kvænangen fjord to the west and the Badderfjorden branches off to the east. The European route E06 highway crosses the fjord on the Sørstraumen Bridge where the fjord is only about 350 metres (1,150 ft) wide, just west of the village of Sekkemo.

There are a number of islands in the fjord. On the west side of the fjord are the islands of Arnøya, Laukøya, Skjervøya, and Kågen. The smaller islands of Haukøya, Rødøya, Skorpa, Nøklan, and Spildra are located in the middle of the fjord.

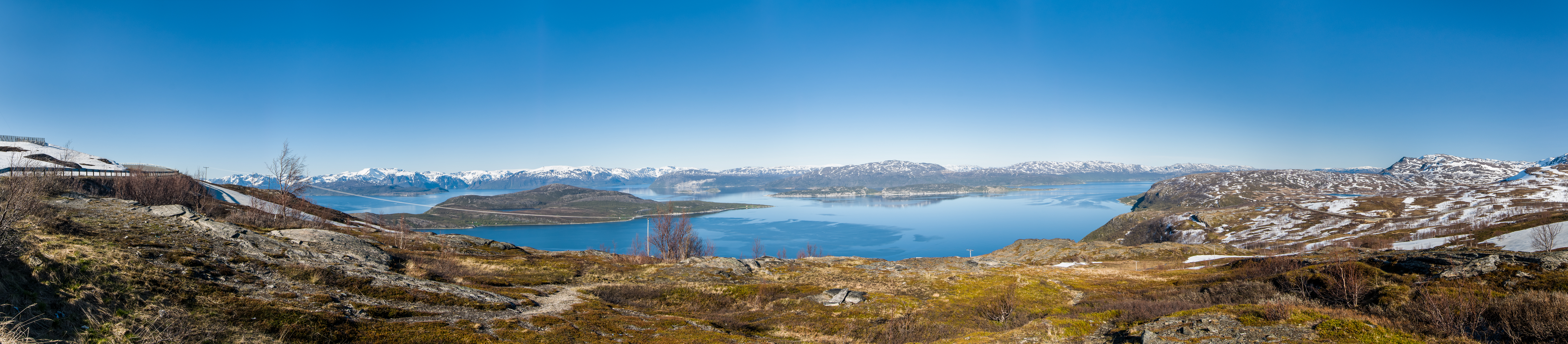
Panorama Kvænangenfjord

== Wildlife ==
Although not in large numbers, cetaceans are known to live in or to visit the fjord. Harbour porpoises and dolphins are more commonly observed, and larger species such as minke whales, sperm whales, and beluga whales can also be seen. In recent years, humpback whales started making comebacks to local waters to feed, and there had been a rare observation of a critically endangered North Atlantic right whale that have become possibly functional extinct in eastern North Atlantic, stayed for several weeks in the fjord, indicating this area was once a part of historical feeding ground for right whales as well.

== See also ==
- List of Norwegian fjords
