= Gardsjøen =

Gardsjøen may refer to several lakes in Norway:

- Gardsjøen (Grue), a lake in Grue municipality in Innlandet county
- Store Gardsjøen, a lake in Tynset municipality in Innlandet county
- Gardsjøen (Sør-Varanger), a lake in Sør-Varanger municipality in Finnmark county

== See also ==
- Nedre Gärdsjö, a locality situated in Rättvik Municipality in Dalarna County, Sweden
