= Gardsjøen (Sør-Varanger) =

Lake in Sør-Varanger, Norway

Gárddebealjávri (Northern Sami); Gardsjøen (Norwegian)
- Interactive map of the lake
- Location: Sør-Varanger Municipality, Finnmark
- Coordinates: 69.7086°N 30.8474°E
- Basin countries: Norway
- Max. length: 1.7 kilometres (1.1 mi)
- Max. width: 700 metres (2,300 ft)
- Surface area: 0.71 km^{2} (0.27 sq mi)
- Shore length^{1}: 4.6 kilometres (2.9 mi)
- Surface elevation: 82 metres (269 ft)
- References: NVE
- ^{1} Shore length is not a well-defined measure.

Gardsjøen (Norwegian) or Gárddebealjávri (Northern Sami) is a lake in Sør-Varanger Municipality in Finnmark county, Norway. The 0.71-square-kilometre (180-acre; 71 ha) lake lies just 1 kilometre (0.62 mi) west of the Jakobselva river which forms the border with Russia. The lake lies about 8 kilometres (5.0 mi) south of the village of Grense Jakobselv.

== See also ==
- List of lakes in Norway
