= King Oscar II Chapel =

- Kong Oscar IIs kapell
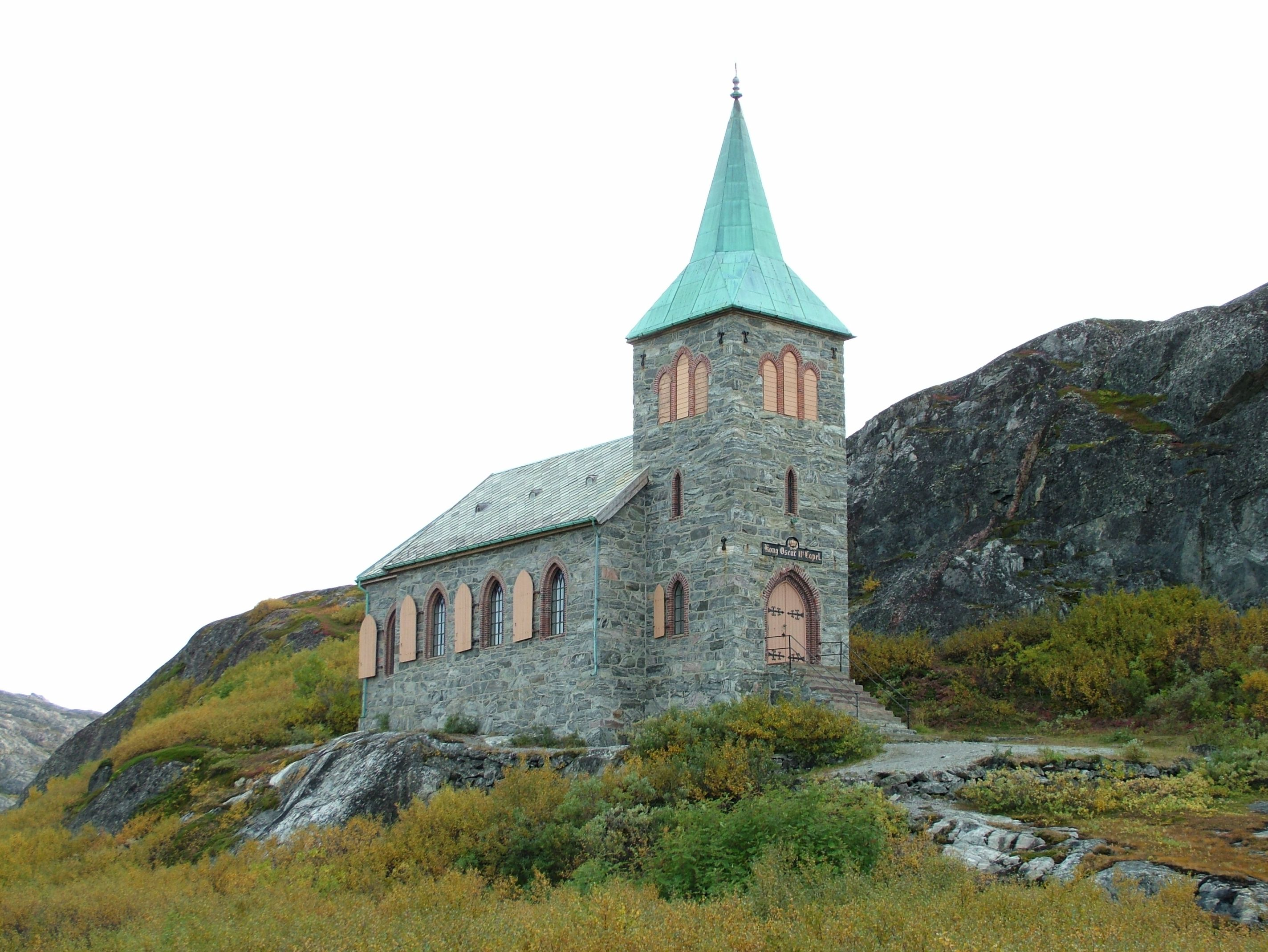
- View of the church
- King Oscar II Chapel
- 69.784905°N 30.811261°E
- Location: Sør-Varanger, Finnmark
- Country: Norway
- Denomination: Church of Norway
- Churchmanship: Evangelical Lutheran

History
- Status: Parish church
- Founded: 1869
- Consecrated: 26 September 1869 (156 years ago)

Architecture
- Functional status: Active
- Architect: Jacob Wilhelm Nordan
- Architectural type: Long church
- Completed: 1869 (157 years ago)

Specifications
- Capacity: 72
- Materials: Stone

Administration
- Diocese: Nord-Hålogaland
- Deanery: Varanger prosti
- Parish: Sør-Varanger
- Norwegian Cultural Heritage Site
- Type: Church
- Status: Listed
- ID: 84810

King Oscar II Chapel (Norwegian: Kong Oscar IIs kapell) is a parish church of the Church of Norway in Sør-Varanger Municipality in Finnmark county, Norway. It is located near the village of Grense Jakobselv, about 500 metres (1,600 ft) from the border with Russia. It is one of the churches for the Sør-Varanger parish which is part of the Varanger prosti (deanery) in the Diocese of Nord-Hålogaland. The stone church was built in a long church style in 1869 by the architect Jacob Wilhelm Nordan (1824–1892). The church seats about 72 people.

== History ==
In 1851, the Norwegian settlement in the Grense Jakobselv area had a strong desire to have its chapel. However, it was politics that would accelerate the work of construction. In 1826, the demarcation of the Norway–Russia border was completed. However, there were still disagreements between the Norwegian authorities and Russian fishermen on the national border (the Jakobselva River) after that time. After reporting several harsh confrontations between Norwegian and Russian fishermen, the County Governor of Finnmark wanted to let a naval ship from the Royal Norwegian Navy undertake fisheries surveillance during the months with the heaviest fishing.

The Interior Ministry wanted an independent investigation of the circumstances and sent Lieutenant Commander Georg Heyerdahl (1798–1853) north to familiarize themselves with the case. Heyerdahl did not share the county Governor's views on which solution. He proposed instead to erect a chapel at Grense Jakobselv. A Lutheran chapel would be an indisputable boundary marking, such as the Russian Orthodox chapel in Boris Gleb that had been used for border demarcation in 1826. In 1865 it was decided to build a chapel and parsonage at the border. In the summer of 1869, the new chapel was built and on 26 September the same year, the chapel was consecrated by Waldemar Hvoslef (1825–1906), Bishop of the Diocese of Bjørgvin.

== Name ==
In 1873, King Oscar II of Sweden and Norway visited the chapel, and to commemorate this visit, he bestowed this chapel with a marble slab with the bilingual inscriptions: Kong Oscar II hørte Guds ord her den 4de Juli 1873 (Norwegian language) and Gonagas Oscar II gulai Ibmel sane dobe dam 4 ad Juli 1873 (Northern Sami language) which means "King Oscar II heard the words of God here on the 4th of July 1873". At the same time, he expressed a desire to name the chapel after himself, so the members of the congregation made a nameplate for him that still hangs over the door.

== Media gallery ==
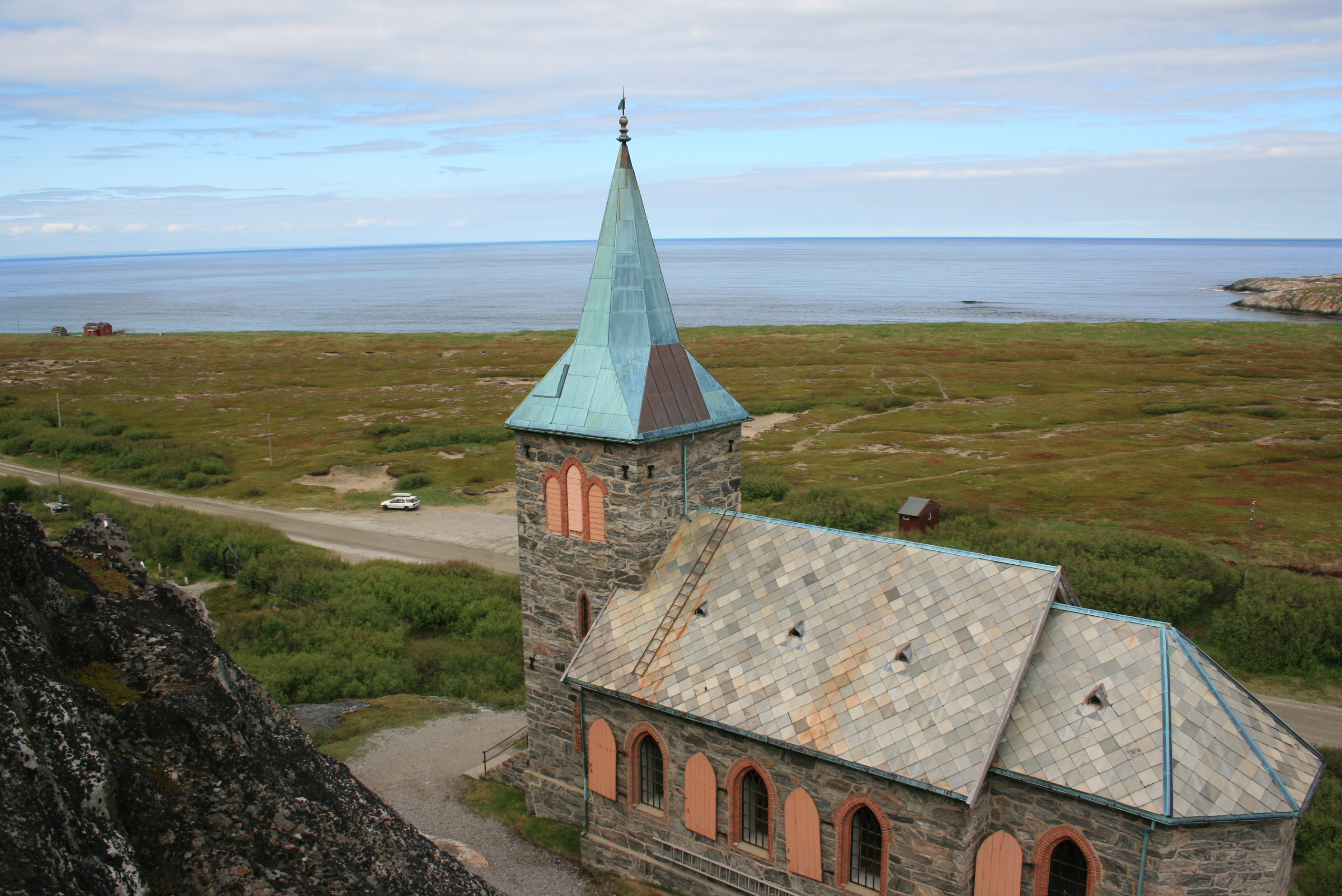

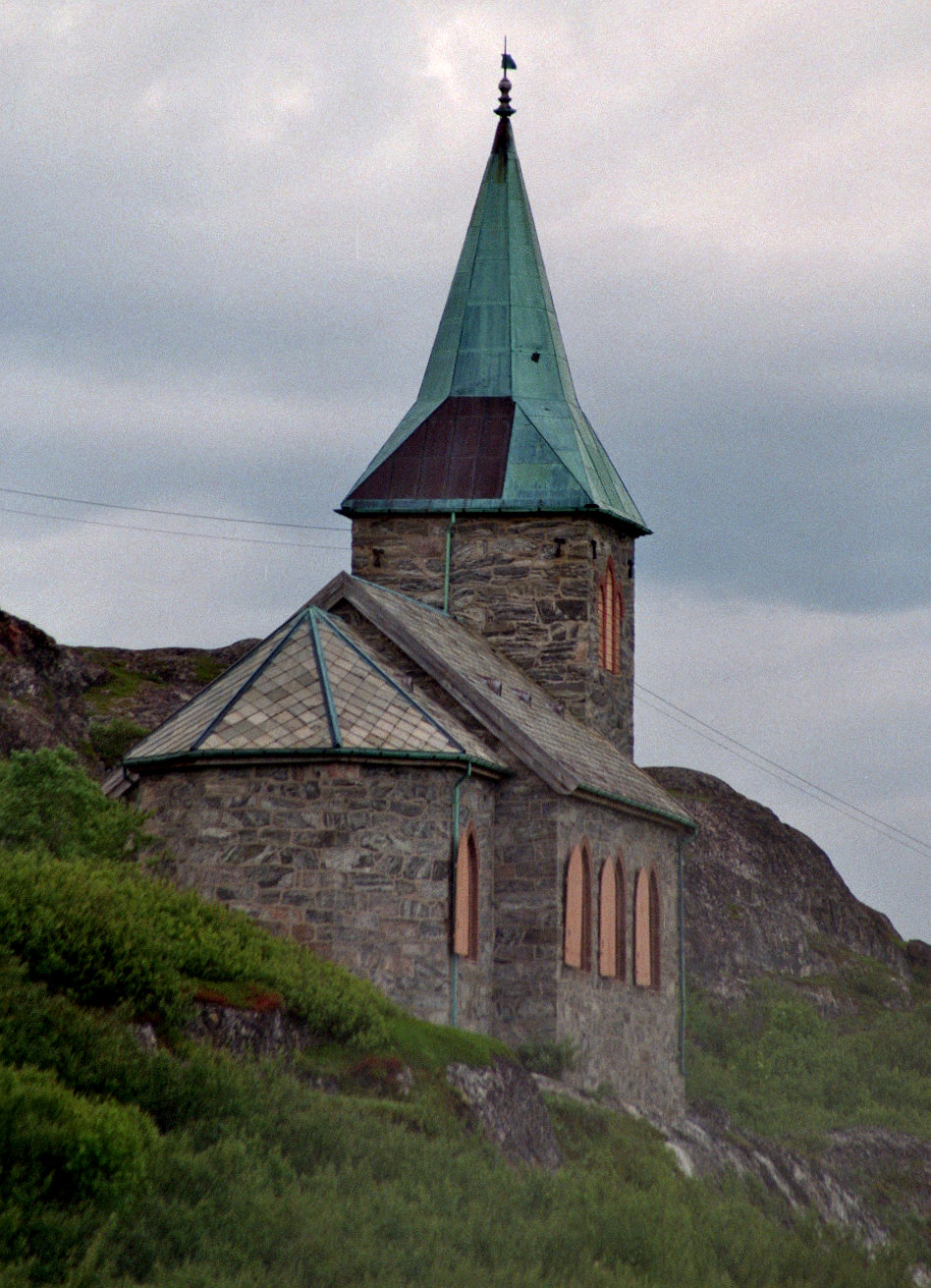

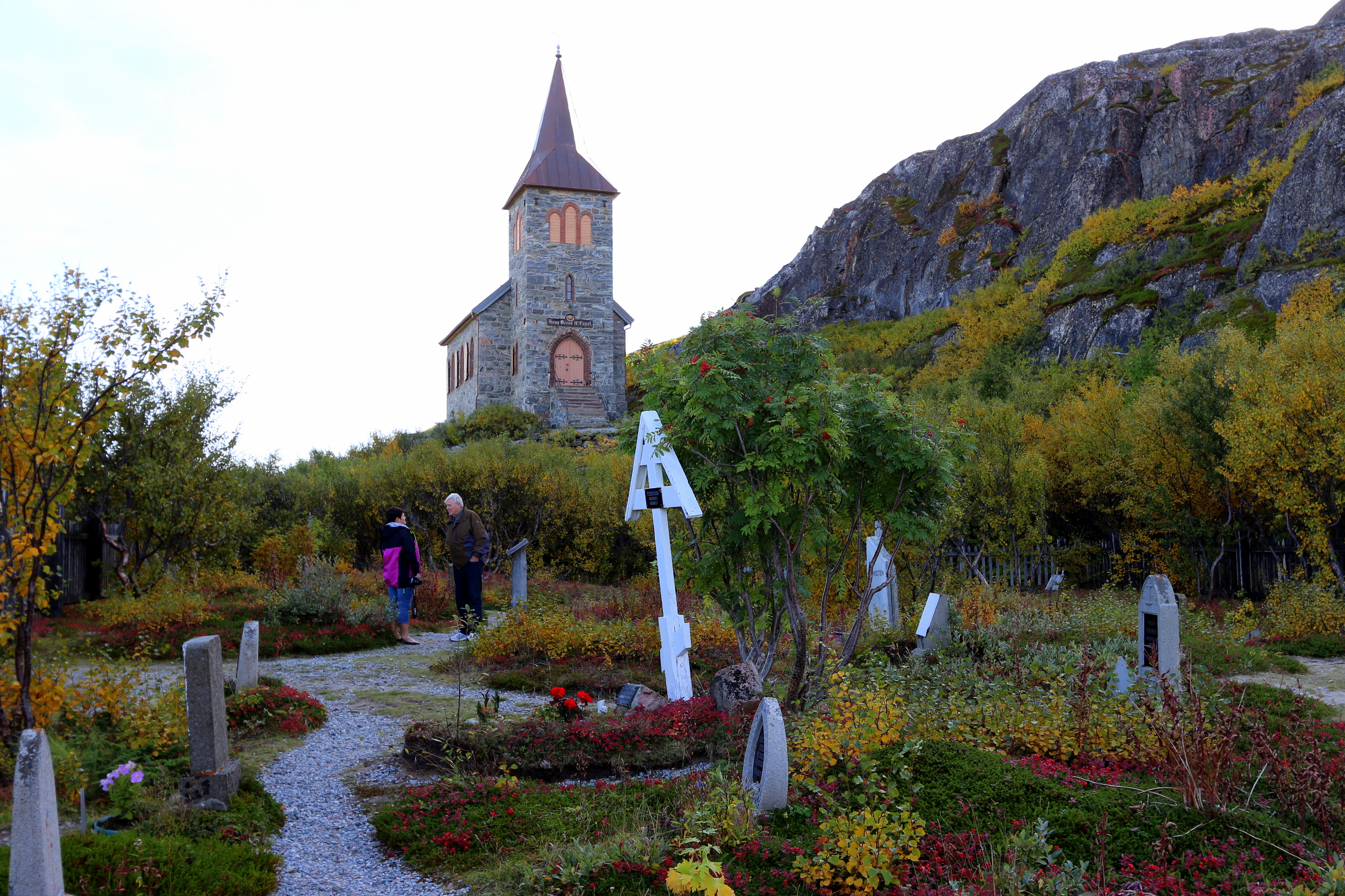

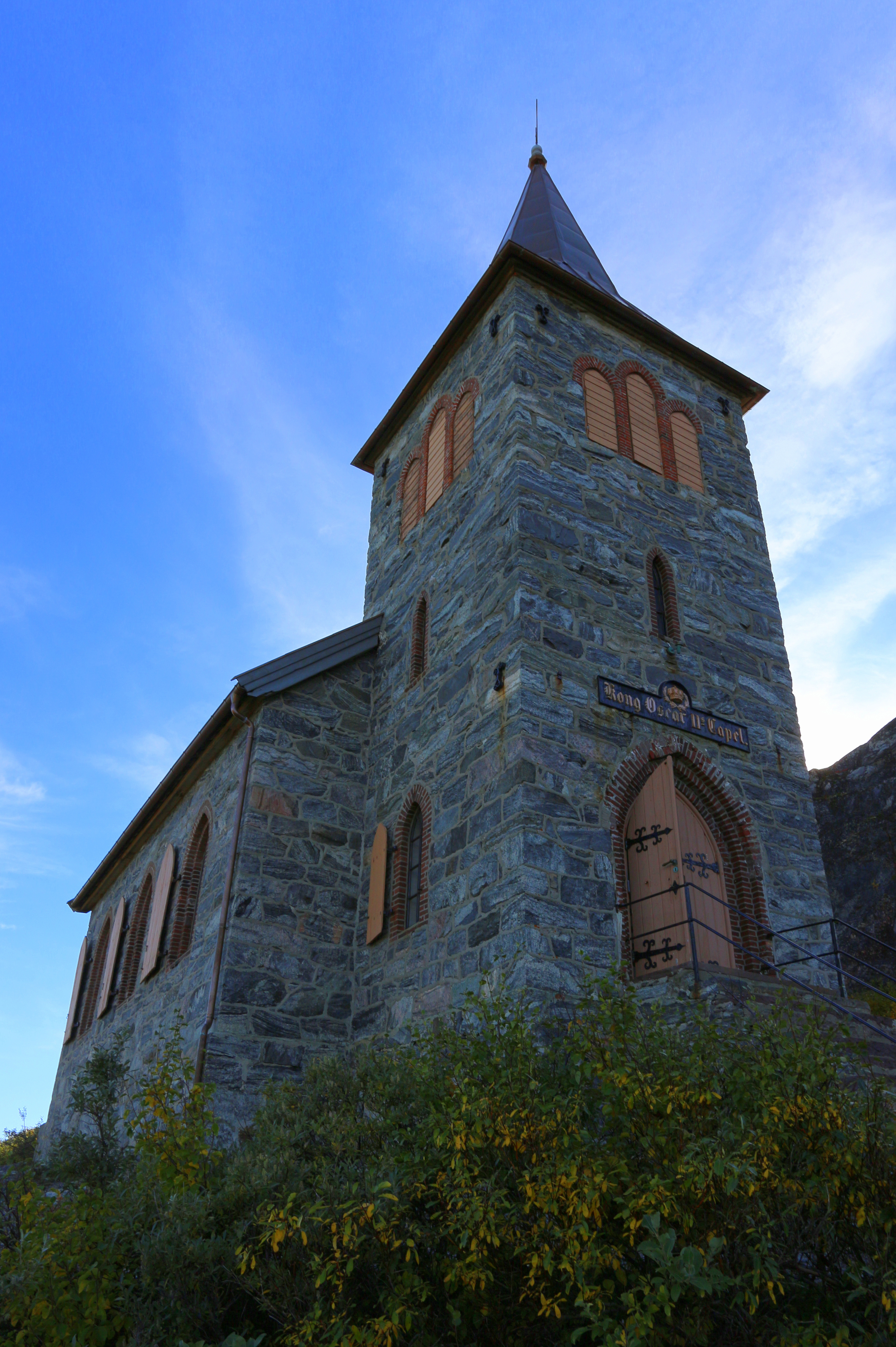

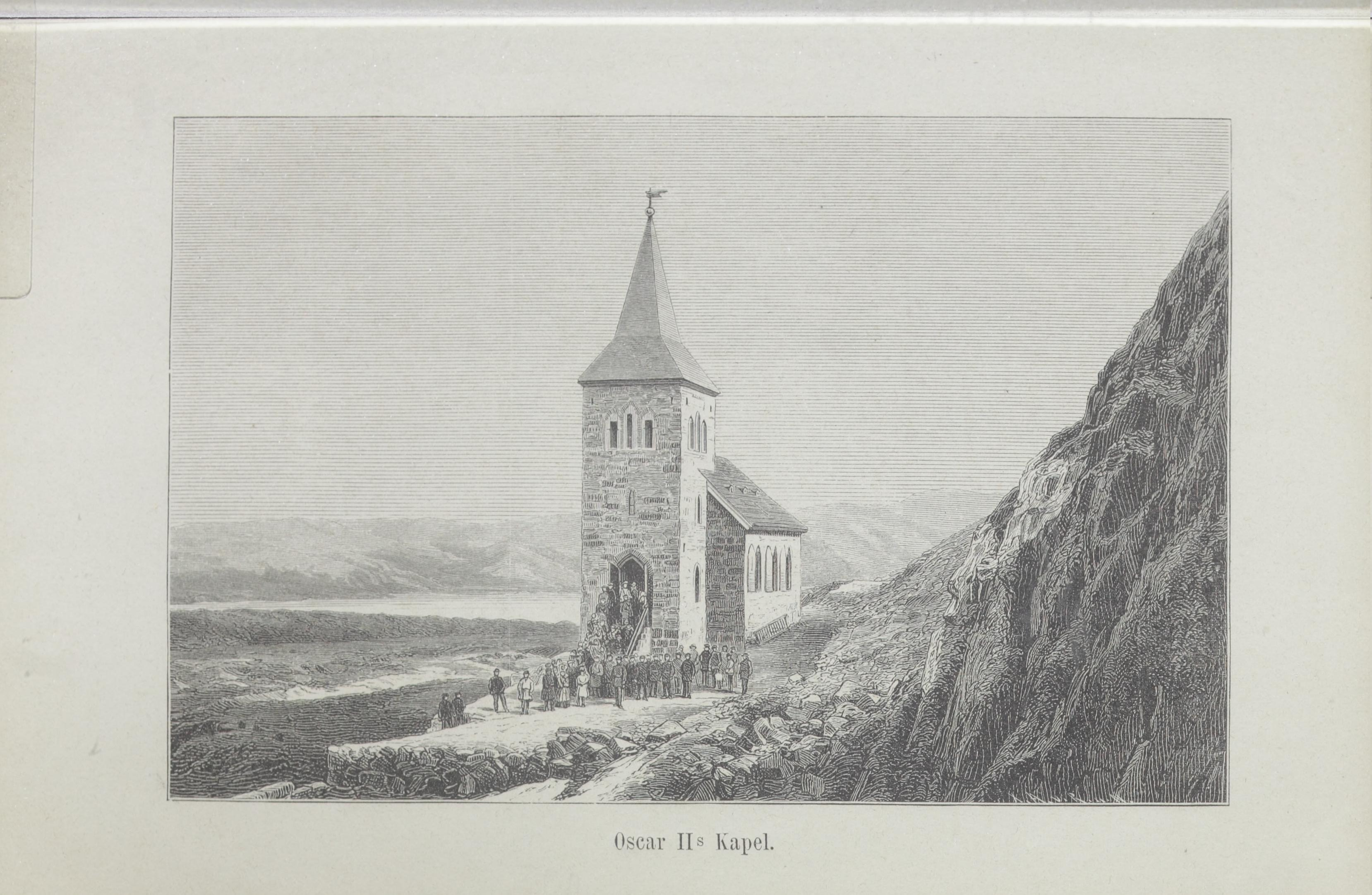

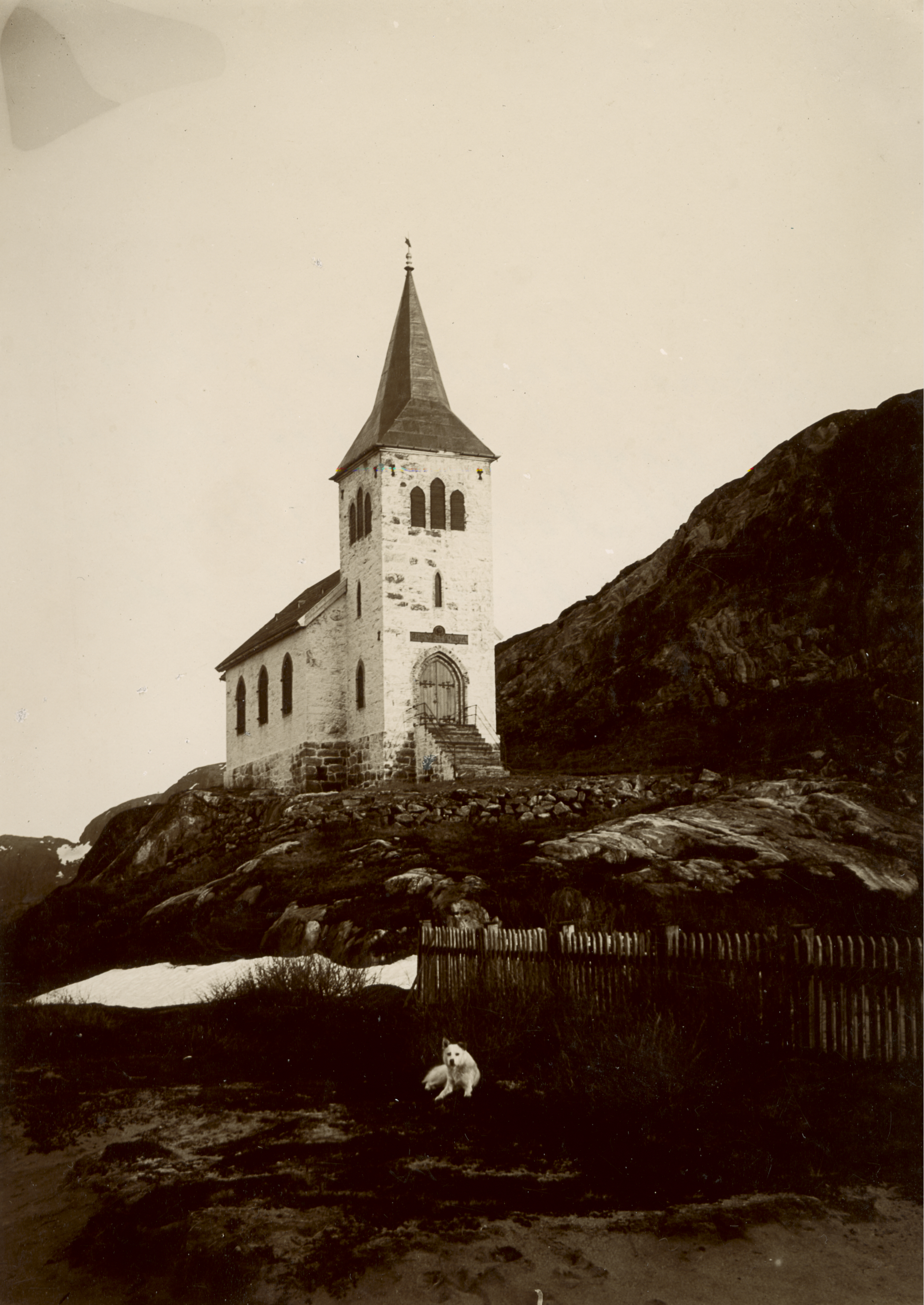

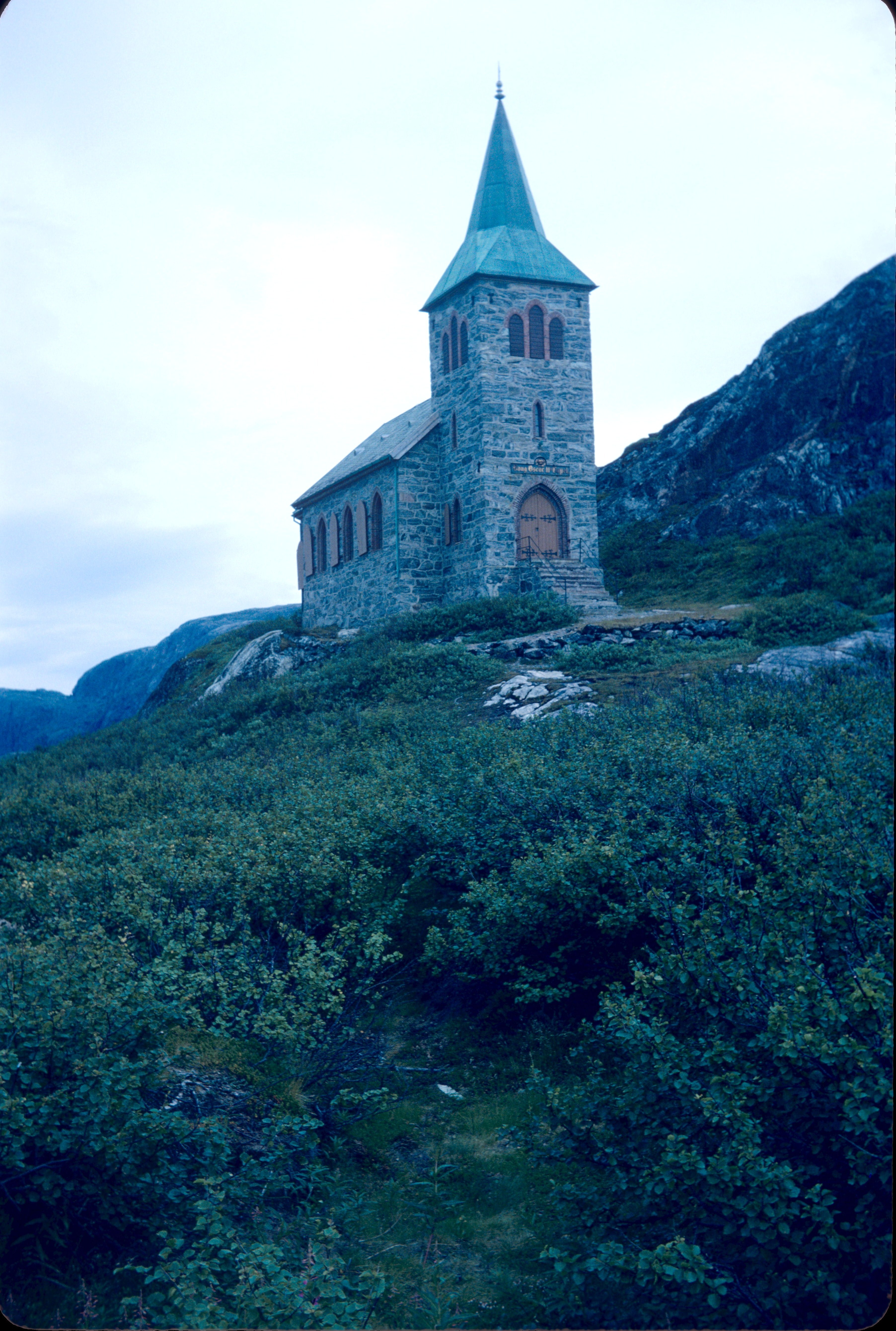

== See also ==
- List of churches in Nord-Hålogaland
