= Holmengrå =

Holmengrå (historically: Holmengraa) may refer to the following:

== Places ==
- Holmengrå, Finnmark, a small fishing village in Sør-Varanger municipality, Finnmark county, Norway
- Holmengrå, Østfold, a small island in Hvaler Municipality in Østfold county, Norway
- Holmengrå, Vestland, a small island in Fedje Municipality in Vestland county, Norway
  - Holmengrå Lighthouse, a lighthouse on the island of Holmengrå in Fedje Municipality in Vestland county, Norway
- Holmengrå, Sweden, a small island just west of Strömstad in Västra Götaland County, Sweden

== Other ==
- Battle of Holmengrå (in Hvaler), a battle during the Civil war era in Norway on 12 Nov 1139
- MS Holmengraa is the name of a Norwegian tanker which was sunk on 28 December 1944 in an Allied air strike during World War II

== See also ==
- Grey Island, originally called Holmen graa, in the South Orkney islands near Antarctica
- Holmengråfjorden, a fjord that flows past Holmengrå in Sør-Varanger, Norway
- Holmengråfjellet, a mountain to the north of Holmengrå in Sør-Varanger, Norway
