= Skogerøya =

Island in Finnmark, Norway

Skogerøya (Norwegian); Sállan (Northern Sami)
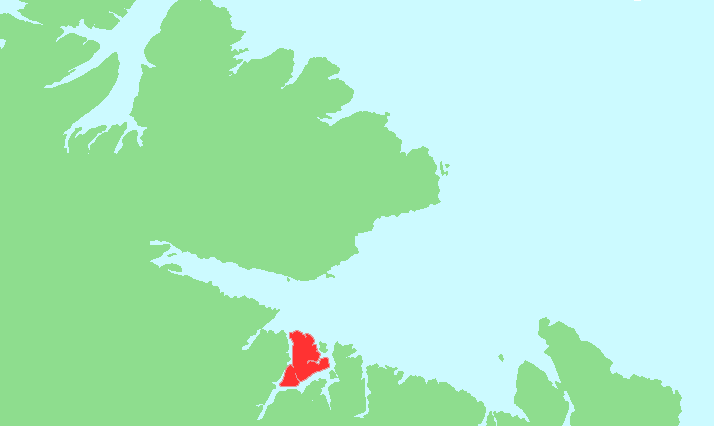
- Location off the Varangerfjord
- Interactive map of: Skogerøya (Norwegian); Sállan (Northern Sami)

Geography
- Location: Finnmark, Norway
- Coordinates: 69.8898°N 29.8447°E
- Area: 129 km^{2} (50 sq mi)
- Length: 18.5 km (11.5 mi)
- Width: 12 km (7.5 mi)
- Highest elevation: 445 m (1460 ft)
- Highest point: Skogerøytoppen

Administration
- Norway
- County: Finnmark
- Municipality: Sør-Varanger Municipality

Demographics
- Population: 2 (2026)
- Pop. density: 0/km^{2} (0/sq mi)

Skogerøya (Norwegian) or Sállan (Northern Sami) is an uninhabited island in Sør-Varanger Municipality in Finnmark county, Norway. The 129-square-kilometre (50 sq mi) partially forested island lies south of Varangerfjorden, west of Bøkfjorden, north of Korsfjorden, and east of Kjøfjorden. The highest point on the island is the 445-metre (1,460 ft) tall Skogerøytoppen. The island lies about 10 kilometres (6.2 mi) northwest of the town of Kirkenes. It is used as a summer and autumn grazing area for reindeer.

== See also ==
- List of islands of Norway
