= Jakobsnes =

Village in Sør-Varanger, Norway

Jakobsnes: Leavanjargg (Skolt Sami); Lávvonjárga (Northern Sami); Jaakonniemi (Kven)
- Village
- Interactive map of Jakobsnes
- Location within Finnmark Location within Norway
- Coordinates: 69°43′42″N 30°07′31″E
- Country: Norway
- Region: Northern Norway
- County: Finnmark
- District: Øst-Finnmark
- Municipality: Sør-Varanger Municipality
- Elevation: 12 m (39 ft)

Population (2005)
  - Total: 271
- Time zone: UTC+01:00 (CET)
  - Summer (DST): UTC+02:00 (CEST)
- Post Code: 9900 Kirkenes

Jakobsnes (Norwegian), Leavanjargg (Skolt Sami), Lávvonjárga (Northern Sami), or Jaakonniemi (Kven) is a village in Sør-Varanger Municipality in Finnmark county, Norway. Its population in 2005 was 271. The village lies on the coast of the Bøkfjorden, across the fjord from the town of Kirkenes, about 6 kilometres (3.7 mi) north of the village of Elvenes.
