= Sør-Varanger Municipality =

Municipality in Finnmark, Norway

Sør-Varanger Municipality Sør-Varanger kommune Mátta-Várjjaga gielda (Northern Sami) Etelä-Varankin kunta (Kven)
- Municipality
- Sørvaranger herred (historic name)
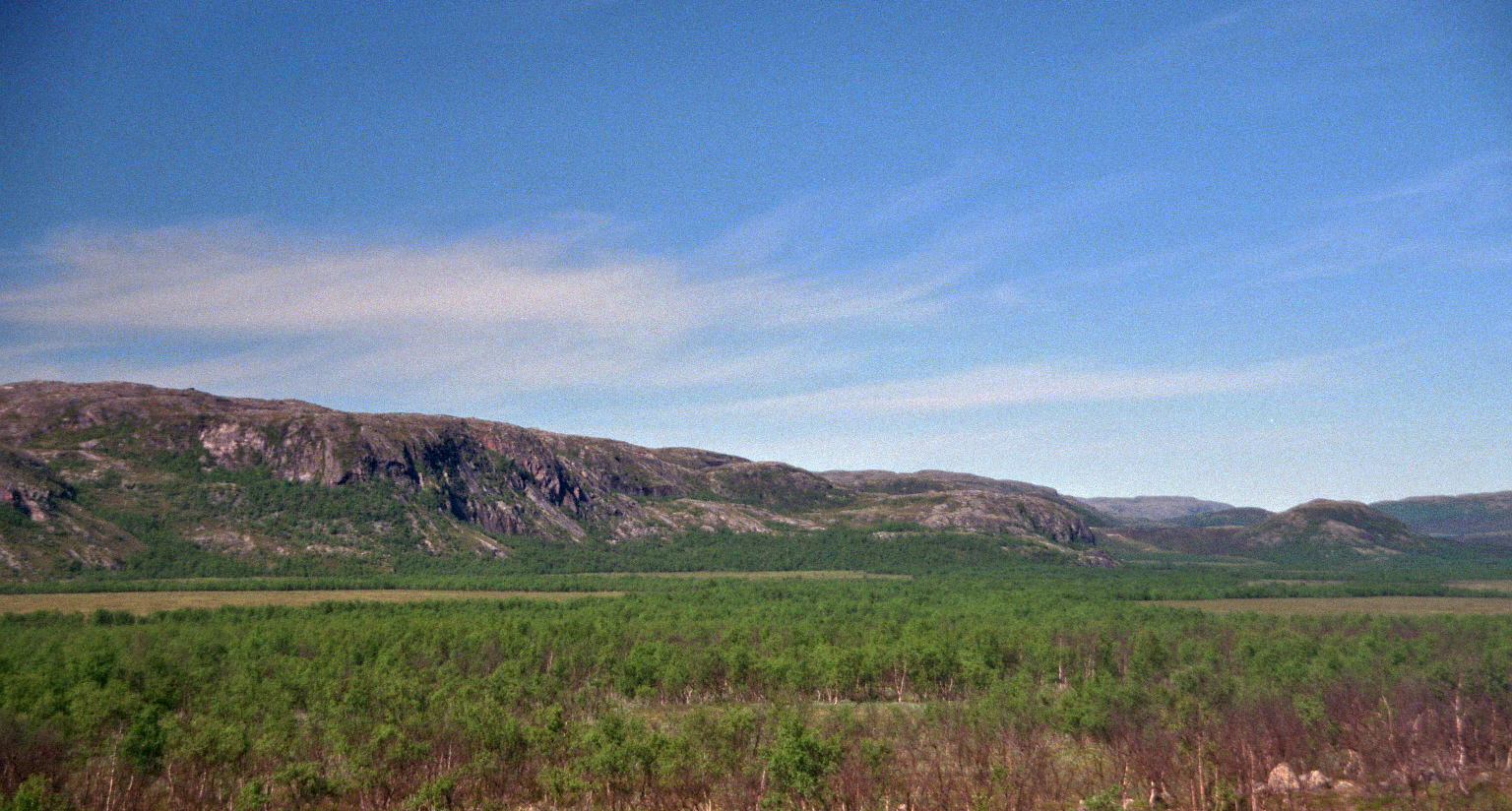

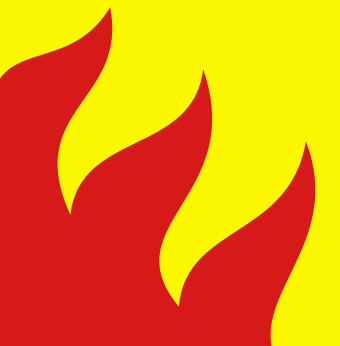
- Flag Coat of arms

- Finnmark within Norway

- Sør-Varanger within Finnmark
- Coordinates: 69°43′43″N 30°02′30″E
- Country: Norway
- County: Finnmark
- District: Øst-Finnmark
- Established: 1 Jul 1858
  - Preceded by: Vadsø Municipality
- Administrative centre: Kirkenes

Government
  - Mayor (2023): Magnus Mæland (H)

Area
  - Total: 3,971.42 km^{2} (1,533.37 sq mi)
  - Land: 3,458.85 km^{2} (1,335.47 sq mi)
  - Water: 512.57 km^{2} (197.90 sq mi) 12.9%
  - Rank: #6 in Norway
- Highest elevation: 497.1 m (1,631 ft)

Population (2024)
  - Total: 10,063
  - Rank: #112 in Norway
  - Density: 2.5/km^{2} (6.5/sq mi)
  - Change (10 years): ▼ −0.3%
- Demonym: Varangværing

Official language
  - Norwegian form: Bokmål
- Time zone: UTC+01:00 (CET)
  - Summer (DST): UTC+02:00 (CEST)
- ISO 3166 code: NO-5605
- Website: Official website

Sør-Varanger (Northern Sami: Máttá-Várjjat; Russian: Сёр-Вара́нгер, romanized: Syor-Varánger) is a municipality in Finnmark county, Norway. The administrative centre of the municipality is the town of Kirkenes. Other settlements in the municipality include the villages of Bjørnevatn, Bugøynes, Elvenes, Grense Jakobselv, Hesseng, Jakobsnes, Neiden, and Sandnes. Located west of the Norway–Russia border, Sør-Varanger is the only Norwegian municipality that shares a land border with Russia, with the only legal border crossing at Storskog.

The 3,971-square-kilometre (1,533 sq mi) municipality is the 6th largest by area out of the 357 municipalities in Norway. Sør-Varanger is the 112th most populous municipality in Norway with a population of 10,063. The municipality's population density is 2.5 inhabitants per square kilometre (6.5/sq mi) and its population has decreased by 0.3% over the previous 10-year period.

There is a Dark-sky park in Pasvik.

== Name ==
The municipality (originally the parish) is named after the large Varangerfjorden (Old Norse: Verangr or Verjanger), located along the northern shore of the municipality (a neighboring municipality on the north side of the same fjord was Nord-Varanger). The first element is verja which is the plural genitive case of the word which means "fishing village". The last element is angr which means "bay" or "small fjord". It was first probably used for the narrow fjord on the inside of Angsnes which now is called "Meskfjorden" and leads into Varangerbotn. Historically, the name of the municipality was spelled Sørvaranger or Sydvaranger. On 3 November 1917, a royal resolution changed the spelling of the name of the municipality to Sør-Varanger.

== History ==
Prehistoric labyrinth constructions at Holmengrå, were possibly used for religious purposes.

The original inhabitants of the area are the Skolt Sami. This Sami group migrated between coast and inland in present Norwegian, Finnish, and Russian territory long before any borders existed. In the 16th century, they were converted to the Russian Orthodox faith, and still today the chapel of Saint George at Neiden, dating from 1565, is a reminder of eastern influence.

Sør-Varanger became Norwegian in 1826, after having been [part of] a Russian-Norwegian fellesdistrikt - a district shared between two countries - that had a small Eastern Sami population group that was under Russian jurisdiction. In 1826, the previously disputed areas were divided between Norway and Russia, causing great difficulties for the Sami. The Norwegian state also invited Norwegian settlers to come to the area, building Lutheran churches to counterbalance the Orthodox heritage, notably the King Oscar II Chapel, located immediately west of the Russian border. The historic border crossing station was at Skafferhullet (which was replaced with the present day station at Storskog).

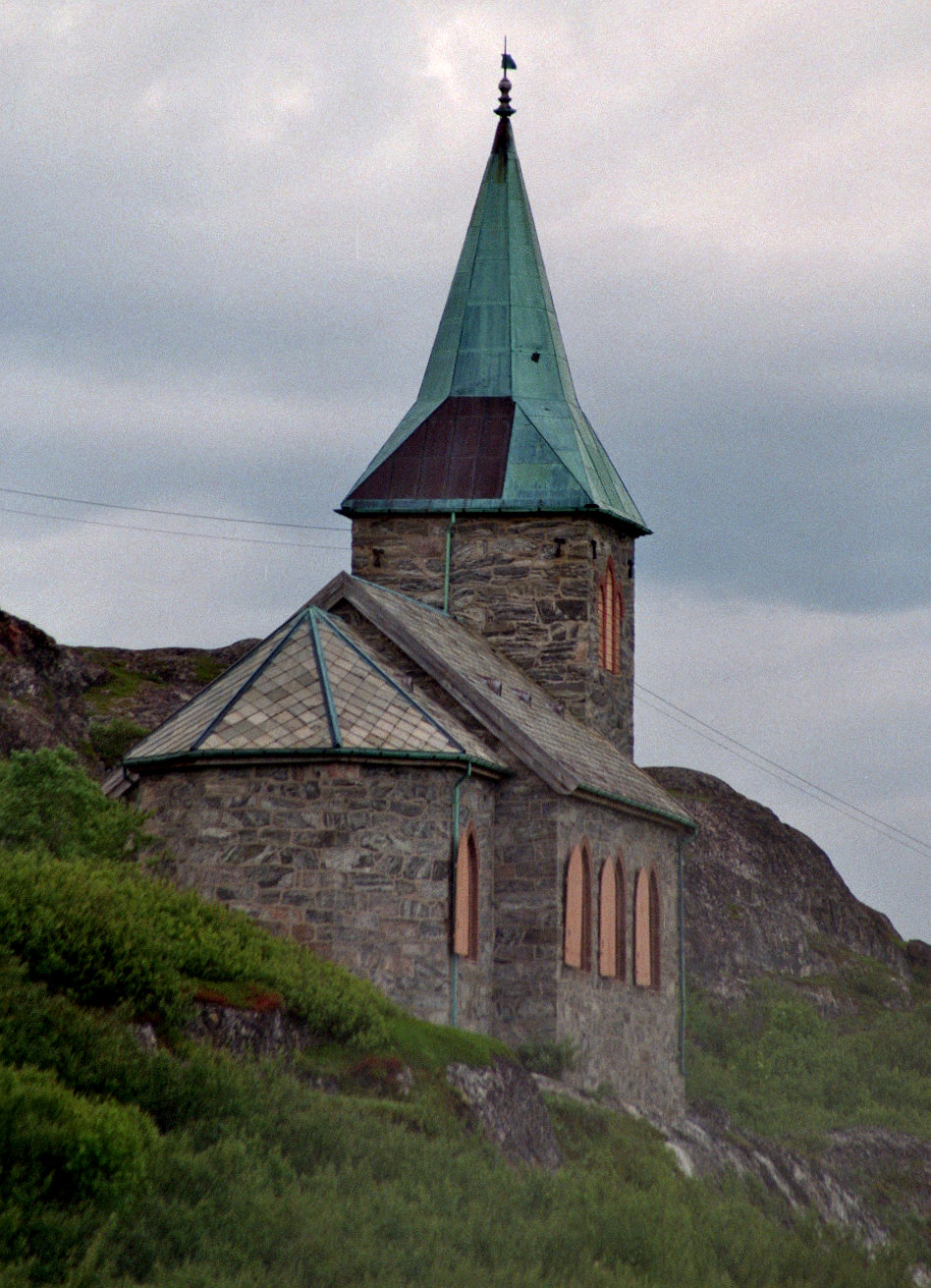
The King Oscar II Chapel on the Russian border

The King Oscar II Chapel in Grense Jakobselv on the Russian border was built in 1869 to mark the border.

During the 19th century, Finnish settlers (Kven) arrived to the valleys, and since 1906, Norwegians came in large numbers because of the iron mining starting up near Kirkenes. After the Treaty of Tartu the area of Petsamo was ceded to Finland, and Sør-Varanger (and Norway) no longer bordered Russia, until Finland had to cede it back to the Soviet Union in 1944.

In 1906, the Sydvaranger company opened the Bjørnevatn Mine at Bjørnevatn and four years later the mine was connected to the port in Kirkenes by Kirkenes–Bjørnevatn Line, the world's most northern railway. The mine was closed in 1996, but re-opened in 2009.

In October 1944, Soviet forces chased Nazi-Germany's forces out of the municipality; some inhabitants were living in tunnels (outside Kirkenes) used for the mining industry, when the Soviet forces arrived; at the time Kirkenes was under intense bombing from aircraft.

In a 1944 report to Norway's prime minister in exile, a Norwegian government official (embedsmann ) in Finnmark—Thore Boye—said that Norwegian soldiers had [crop-] cut (snauklippet) "25 young girls—some of them married" who had been pointed out by local men, as having had relations with German soldiers".

=== Establishment of municipality ===
The municipality of Sør-Varanger was established on 1 July 1858 when the large Vadsø Municipality (population: 1,171) was divided and the part located south of the Varangerfjorden became the new Sør-Varanger municipality. The borders of the municipality have not changed since that time.

On 1 January 2020, the municipality became part of the newly formed Troms og Finnmark county. Previously, it had been part of the old Finnmark county. On 1 January 2024, the Troms og Finnmark county was divided and the municipality once again became part of Finnmark county.

=== Coat of arms ===
The coat of arms was granted on 16 April 1982. The official blazon is "Per bend rayonny Or and gules" (Norwegian: Skrådelt av gult og rødt ved tretunget flammesnitt). This means the arms have a field (background) with a diagonal line in the shape of flames. Above the line, the field has a tincture of Or which means it is commonly colored yellow, but if it is made out of metal, then gold is used. Below the line, the field has a tincture of gules (red). The arms show three flames along the division of the field. The division of the shield symbolizes the importance of the number three: The three main sources of income are agriculture, mining, and fishing; the municipality also has three main rivers (Neiden, Pasvikelva, and Jakobselva) that form the borders of Norway, Russia, and Finland; and there are three cultures in the municipality: Norwegians, Finns, and Sami.

== Geography ==
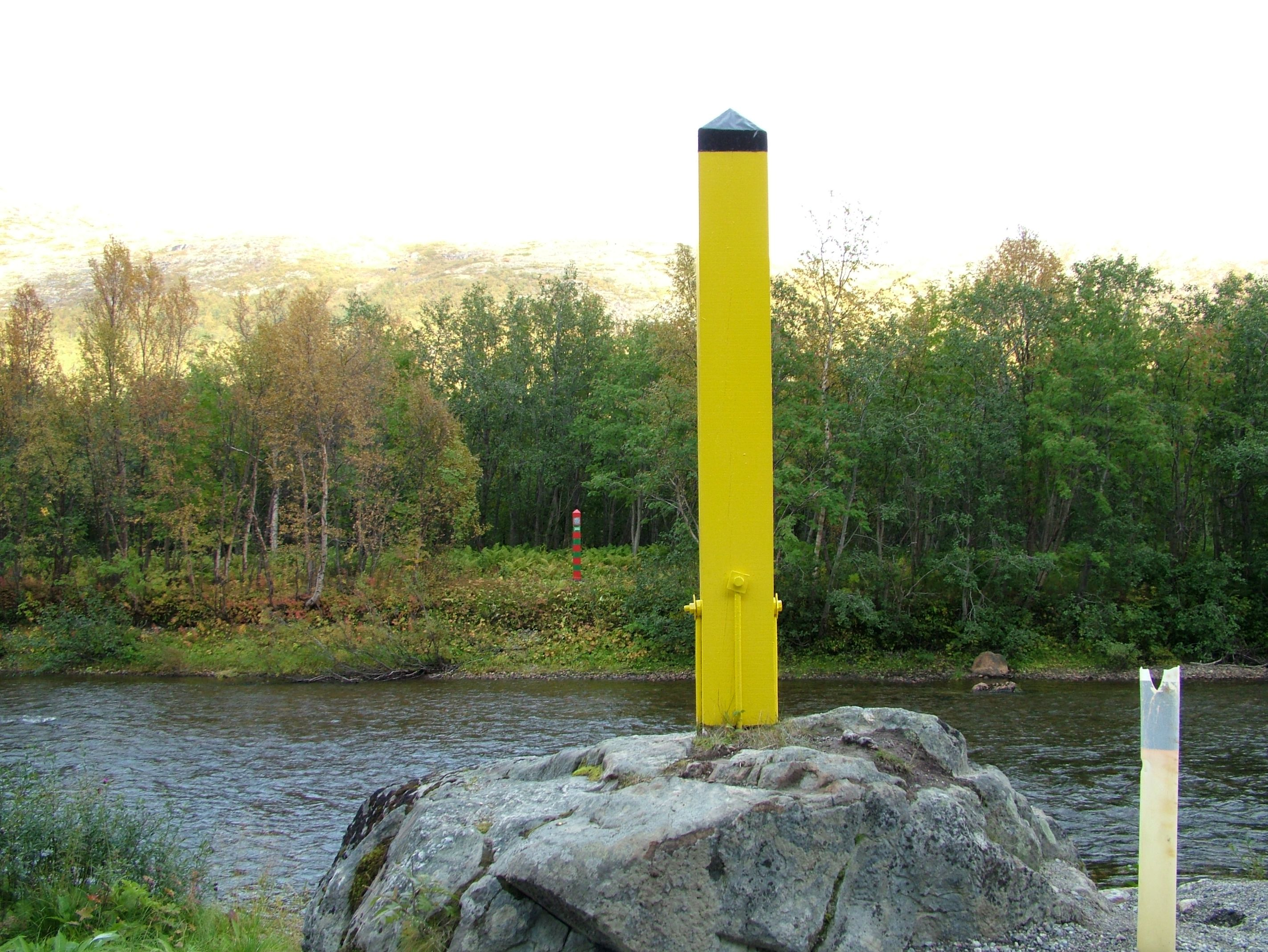
The border with Russia follows the Grense Jakobselv in the northeast near the Barents Sea, while Pasvikelva forms the border further south along the Pasvik Valley.

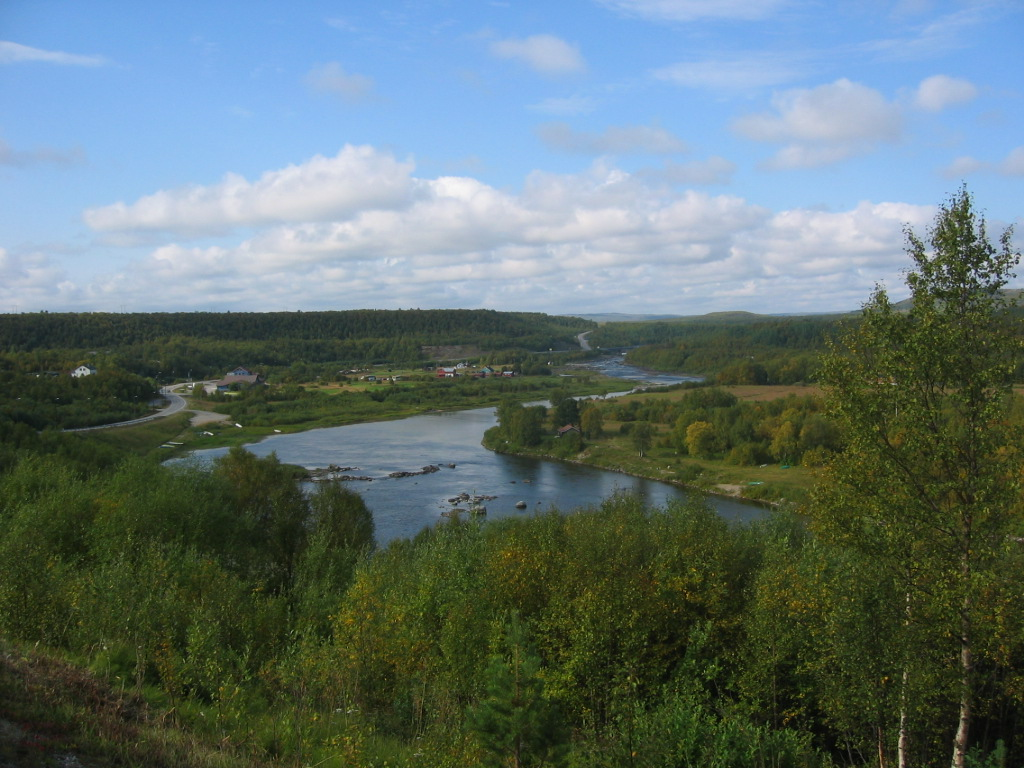
Neiden, Sør-Varanger. The Skoltesami traditionally catch salmon with a technique using small nets.

Sør-Varanger is a vast area of about 3,700 square kilometres (1,429 mi^{2}), situated between Finland and Russia. Most of the area is low-lying forest of pine and birch, with barren sections facing the Barents Sea. The highest point in the municipality is the 497.1-metre (1,631 ft) tall mountain Báhttervárri.

The Varangerfjorden runs along the northern part of the municipality and the Bøkfjorden runs north–south cutting into the municipality and flowing into the Varangerfjorden. The large island of Skogerøya lies on the west side of the Bøkfjorden. Skogerøytoppen is the tallest mountain on Skogerøya. The Bøkfjord Lighthouse lies along the mouth of the Bøkfjorden.

The municipal centre of Sør-Varanger is the town of Kirkenes, located on a peninsula in the Bøkfjorden. Other settlements include Bugøynes, Neiden, and little hamlets along the river of Pasvikelva. The local airport is called Kirkenes Airport, Høybuktmoen which is also a military camp. The Garrison of Sør-Varanger (GSV) is based at Høybuktmoen.

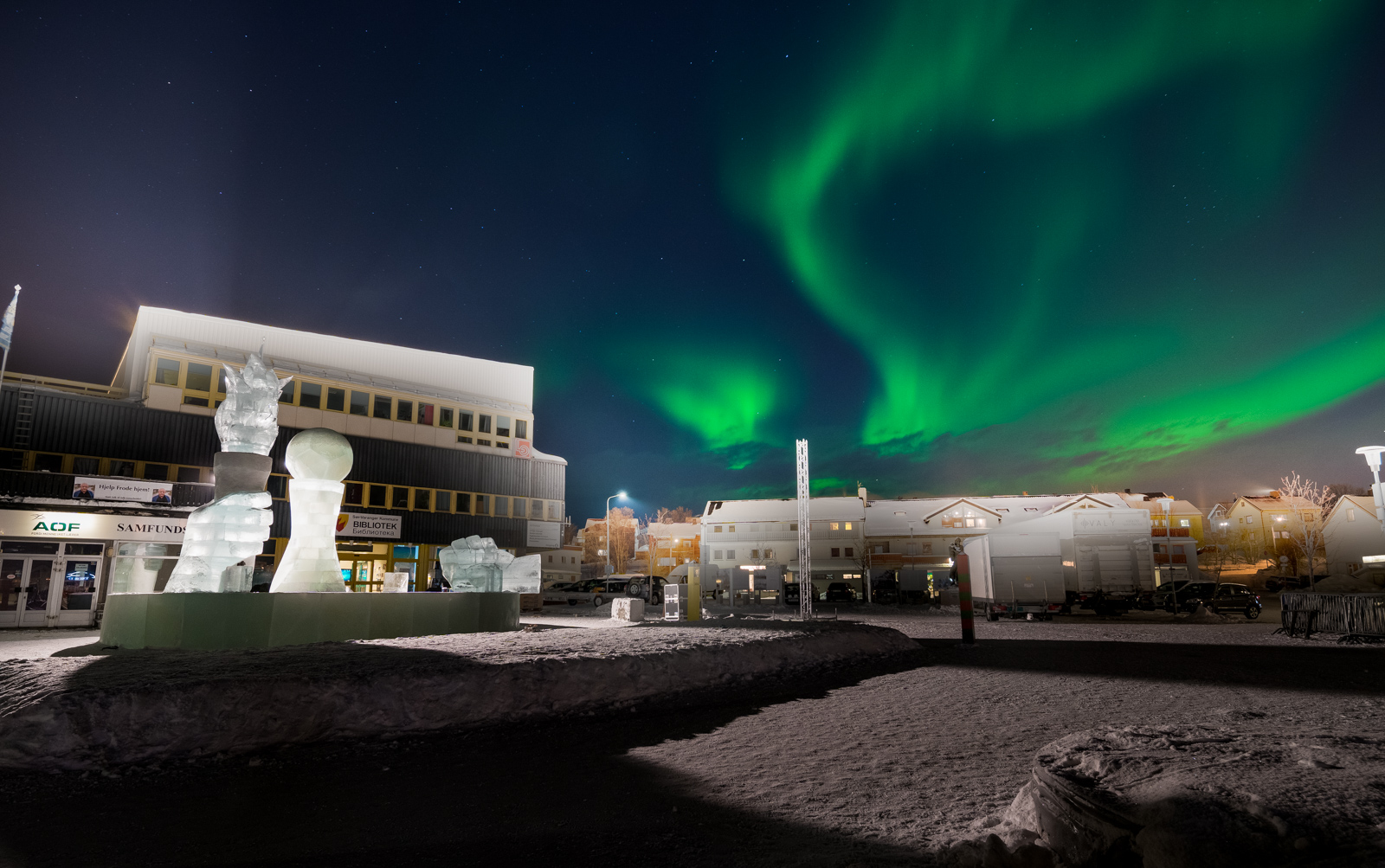
Aurora Borealis over Kirkenes

The flora of the area is a part of the Russian and Siberian taiga, including a few hundred spruce trees of the Russian variety. Bears also inhabit the upper valley, notably in the Øvre Pasvik National Park, Øvre Pasvik Landscape Protection Area, and Pasvik Nature Reserve.

Lakes include Ellenvatnet, Gardsjøen, Garsjøen, Klistervatnet, and Ødevatnet. The fjords include Korsfjorden.

=== Climate ===
Sør-Varanger has a boreal climate (subarctic) with long, cold winters. Summers are short, but can sometimes see warm temperatures.

Climate data for Kirkenes Airport 1991–2020 (89 m, extremes 1957–2024)
| Month | Jan | Feb | Mar | Apr | May | Jun | Jul | Aug | Sep | Oct | Nov | Dec | Year |
|---|---|---|---|---|---|---|---|---|---|---|---|---|---|
| Record high °C (°F) | 5.3 (41.5) | 7.3 (45.1) | 6.1 (43.0) | 14.4 (57.9) | 28.8 (83.8) | 31.6 (88.9) | 32.7 (90.9) | 30.7 (87.3) | 22.2 (72.0) | 13.6 (56.5) | 11.6 (52.9) | 7 (45) | 32.7 (90.9) |
| Mean daily maximum °C (°F) | −6.4 (20.5) | −6.5 (20.3) | −2.8 (27.0) | 1.7 (35.1) | 7.4 (45.3) | 12.4 (54.3) | 16.4 (61.5) | 14.8 (58.6) | 10.2 (50.4) | 3.2 (37.8) | −1.9 (28.6) | −4 (25) | 3.7 (38.7) |
| Daily mean °C (°F) | −10.1 (13.8) | −9.9 (14.2) | −5.6 (21.9) | −0.8 (30.6) | 4.3 (39.7) | 8.7 (47.7) | 12.4 (54.3) | 11.3 (52.3) | 7.3 (45.1) | 1.2 (34.2) | −4.4 (24.1) | −7.3 (18.9) | 0.6 (33.1) |
| Mean daily minimum °C (°F) | −13.6 (7.5) | −13.3 (8.1) | −9.2 (15.4) | −4.2 (24.4) | 1.1 (34.0) | 5.5 (41.9) | 9.1 (48.4) | 8.3 (46.9) | 4.7 (40.5) | −0.9 (30.4) | −7.2 (19.0) | −10.6 (12.9) | −2.5 (27.5) |
| Record low °C (°F) | −41.8 (−43.2) | −38.9 (−38.0) | −29.8 (−21.6) | −20.9 (−5.6) | −13.6 (7.5) | −2.5 (27.5) | 2.4 (36.3) | −1.5 (29.3) | −5.9 (21.4) | −21.7 (−7.1) | −27.5 (−17.5) | −34 (−29) | −41.8 (−43.2) |
| Average precipitation mm (inches) | 31.3 (1.23) | 30 (1.2) | 28.7 (1.13) | 26.9 (1.06) | 26.8 (1.06) | 49.2 (1.94) | 56.2 (2.21) | 55.4 (2.18) | 37.9 (1.49) | 43.7 (1.72) | 36.8 (1.45) | 32.5 (1.28) | 458.8 (18.06) |
| Average precipitation days (≥ 1.0 mm) | 9.4 | 7.3 | 6.8 | 6.5 | 6.3 | 7.6 | 9.0 | 9.7 | 8 | 10.2 | 9.3 | 8.5 | 98.6 |
Source 1: yr.no/statistics Kirkenes Airport
Source 2: National Oceanic and Atmospheric Administration

Climate data for Pasvik - Svanvik 1991–2020 (27 m, avg high/low 2009-2025, extremes 1957–2024)
| Month | Jan | Feb | Mar | Apr | May | Jun | Jul | Aug | Sep | Oct | Nov | Dec | Year |
|---|---|---|---|---|---|---|---|---|---|---|---|---|---|
| Mean daily maximum °C (°F) | −8.1 (17.4) | −6.4 (20.5) | −1.3 (29.7) | 4 (39) | 10.1 (50.2) | 15.4 (59.7) | 19.3 (66.7) | 17.1 (62.8) | 12.1 (53.8) | 4 (39) | −1.8 (28.8) | −5.3 (22.5) | 4.9 (40.8) |
| Daily mean °C (°F) | −12.4 (9.7) | −11.4 (11.5) | −6.6 (20.1) | −0.8 (30.6) | 4.6 (40.3) | 9.7 (49.5) | 13.5 (56.3) | 11.7 (53.1) | 7.3 (45.1) | 1 (34) | −5 (23) | −9.2 (15.4) | 0.2 (32.4) |
| Mean daily minimum °C (°F) | −17.6 (0.3) | −15.1 (4.8) | −11.9 (10.6) | −4.8 (23.4) | 1.2 (34.2) | 5.9 (42.6) | 9.4 (48.9) | 7.8 (46.0) | 4.3 (39.7) | −1.3 (29.7) | −7.9 (17.8) | −14 (7) | −3.7 (25.4) |
| Average precipitation mm (inches) | 28 (1.1) | 21 (0.8) | 31 (1.2) | 30 (1.2) | 37 (1.5) | 67 (2.6) | 69 (2.7) | 69 (2.7) | 43 (1.7) | 43 (1.7) | 25 (1.0) | 30 (1.2) | 493 (19.4) |
Source 1: yr.no
Source 2: Seklima (avg high/lows)

Climate data for Kirkenes Airport, Høybuktmoen 1961-90
| Month | Jan | Feb | Mar | Apr | May | Jun | Jul | Aug | Sep | Oct | Nov | Dec | Year |
|---|---|---|---|---|---|---|---|---|---|---|---|---|---|
| Mean daily maximum °C (°F) | −8.2 (17.2) | −7.8 (18.0) | −3.8 (25.2) | 0.6 (33.1) | 5.7 (42.3) | 12.5 (54.5) | 16.1 (61.0) | 13.9 (57.0) | 8.8 (47.8) | 2.4 (36.3) | −2.8 (27.0) | −5.9 (21.4) | 2.6 (36.7) |
| Daily mean °C (°F) | −11.8 (10.8) | −11.3 (11.7) | −7.4 (18.7) | −2.4 (27.7) | 3.0 (37.4) | 8.5 (47.3) | 12.1 (53.8) | 10.5 (50.9) | 6.2 (43.2) | 0.4 (32.7) | −5.5 (22.1) | −9.7 (14.5) | −0.6 (30.9) |
| Mean daily minimum °C (°F) | −16.2 (2.8) | −15.1 (4.8) | −10.8 (12.6) | −5.7 (21.7) | 0.0 (32.0) | 5.2 (41.4) | 8.7 (47.7) | 7.5 (45.5) | 3.6 (38.5) | −1.9 (28.6) | −8.7 (16.3) | −13.4 (7.9) | −3.9 (25.0) |
| Average precipitation mm (inches) | 32 (1.3) | 23 (0.9) | 21 (0.8) | 20 (0.8) | 23 (0.9) | 41 (1.6) | 60 (2.4) | 62 (2.4) | 47 (1.9) | 35 (1.4) | 33 (1.3) | 33 (1.3) | 430 (16.9) |
| Average precipitation days (≥ 1 mm) | 8.5 | 6.5 | 6.0 | 6.2 | 6.0 | 8.2 | 8.9 | 10.5 | 9.8 | 9.5 | 8.6 | 9.0 | 97.7 |
Source: Norwegian Meteorological Institute

== Economy ==
The service sector is one of the two most important industries related to the city of Kirkenes. Kimek, a company for repair of boats and ships, has 66 employees (as of Q4 2024); the company is one of the largest employers in the municipality - alongside the municipality itself.

As of 2013, 2.8% of the work force in Sør-Varanger are employed in the primary sector.

Cruise ships have in 2022, stopped using the port at Kirkenes; ship owners consider the port to be too close to the [Russian border or] Russia; in 2022 the war between Russia and Ukraine escalated.

In regard to the mining complex at Bjørnevatn: As of Q4 2026, the government will not be contributing to the financing of re-starting mining operations; a former operator - the mining company Sydvaranger went bankrupt in 2015. Sydvaranger (company) changed hands in 2024.

A research station at Svanvik (which is part of Norsk institutt for bioøkonomi), has employees of the national government.

== Government ==
Sør-Varanger Municipality is responsible for primary education (through 10th grade), outpatient health services, senior citizen services, welfare and other social services, zoning, economic development, and municipal roads and utilities. The municipality is governed by a municipal council of directly elected representatives. The mayor is indirectly elected by a vote of the municipal council. The municipality is under the jurisdiction of the Indre og Østre Finnmark District Court and the Hålogaland Court of Appeal.

=== Municipal council ===
The municipal council (Norwegian: Kommunestyre) of Sør-Varanger Municipality is made up of 27 representatives that are elected to four year terms. The tables below show the current and historical composition of the council by political party.

Sør-Varanger kommunestyre 2023–2027
| Party name (in Norwegian) | Number of representatives |
|---|---|
| Labour Party (Arbeiderpartiet) | 7 |
| Progress Party (Fremskrittspartiet) | 3 |
| Conservative Party (Høyre) | 8 |
| Red Party (Rødt) | 2 |
| Centre Party (Senterpartiet) | 2 |
| Socialist Left Party (Sosialistisk Venstreparti) | 3 |
| Total number of members: | 25 |

Sør-Varanger kommunestyre 2019–2023
| Party name (in Norwegian) | Number of representatives |
|---|---|
| Labour Party (Arbeiderpartiet) | 11 |
| Progress Party (Fremskrittspartiet) | 1 |
| Green Party (Miljøpartiet De Grønne) | 1` |
| Conservative Party (Høyre) | 4 |
| Red Party (Rødt) | 1 |
| Centre Party (Senterpartiet) | 6 |
| Socialist Left Party (Sosialistisk Venstreparti) | 3 |
| Total number of members: | 27 |

Sør-Varanger kommunestyre 2015–2019
| Party name (in Norwegian) | Number of representatives |
|---|---|
| Labour Party (Arbeiderpartiet) | 14 |
| Progress Party (Fremskrittspartiet) | 2 |
| Conservative Party (Høyre) | 4 |
| Centre Party (Senterpartiet) | 5 |
| Socialist Left Party (Sosialistisk Venstreparti) | 2 |
| Total number of members: | 27 |

Sør-Varanger kommunestyre 2011–2015
| Party name (in Norwegian) | Number of representatives |
|---|---|
| Labour Party (Arbeiderpartiet) | 10 |
| Progress Party (Fremskrittspartiet) | 2 |
| Conservative Party (Høyre) | 5 |
| Centre Party (Senterpartiet) | 5 |
| Socialist Left Party (Sosialistisk Venstreparti) | 2 |
| Liberal Party (Venstre) | 1 |
| Total number of members: | 25 |

Sør-Varanger kommunestyre 2007–2011
| Party name (in Norwegian) | Number of representatives |
|---|---|
| Labour Party (Arbeiderpartiet) | 11 |
| Progress Party (Fremskrittspartiet) | 4 |
| Conservative Party (Høyre) | 2 |
| Centre Party (Senterpartiet) | 5 |
| Socialist Left Party (Sosialistisk Venstreparti) | 2 |
| Mátte Várjjat List (Mátte Várjjat Listu) | 1 |
| Total number of members: | 25 |

Sør-Varanger kommunestyre 2003–2007
| Party name (in Norwegian) | Number of representatives |
|---|---|
| Labour Party (Arbeiderpartiet) | 7 |
| Progress Party (Fremskrittspartiet) | 4 |
| Conservative Party (Høyre) | 4 |
| Centre Party (Senterpartiet) | 3 |
| Socialist Left Party (Sosialistisk Venstreparti) | 5 |
| Mátte Várjjat List (Mátte Várjjat Listu) | 2 |
| Total number of members: | 25 |

Sør-Varanger kommunestyre 1999–2003
| Party name (in Norwegian) | Number of representatives |
|---|---|
| Labour Party (Arbeiderpartiet) | 14 |
| Conservative Party (Høyre) | 9 |
| Centre Party (Senterpartiet) | 3 |
| Socialist Left Party (Sosialistisk Venstreparti) | 3 |
| Liberal Party (Venstre) | 1 |
| Mátte Várjjat List (Mátte Várjjat Listu) | 2 |
| Total number of members: | 31 |

Sør-Varanger kommunestyre 1995–1999
| Party name (in Norwegian) | Number of representatives |
|---|---|
| Labour Party (Arbeiderpartiet) | 17 |
| Conservative Party (Høyre) | 8 |
| Centre Party (Senterpartiet) | 6 |
| Socialist Left Party (Sosialistisk Venstreparti) | 4 |
| Liberal Party (Venstre) | 2 |
| Total number of members: | 37 |

Sør-Varanger kommunestyre 1991–1995
| Party name (in Norwegian) | Number of representatives |
|---|---|
| Labour Party (Arbeiderpartiet) | 16 |
| Conservative Party (Høyre) | 9 |
| Centre Party (Senterpartiet) | 3 |
| Socialist Left Party (Sosialistisk Venstreparti) | 9 |
| Total number of members: | 37 |

Sør-Varanger kommunestyre 1987–1991
| Party name (in Norwegian) | Number of representatives |
|---|---|
| Labour Party (Arbeiderpartiet) | 19 |
| Progress Party (Fremskrittspartiet) | 2 |
| Conservative Party (Høyre) | 9 |
| Christian Democratic Party (Kristelig Folkeparti) | 1 |
| Red Electoral Alliance (Rød Valgallianse) | 1 |
| Centre Party (Senterpartiet) | 1 |
| Socialist Left Party (Sosialistisk Venstreparti) | 4 |
| Total number of members: | 37 |

Sør-Varanger kommunestyre 1983–1987
| Party name (in Norwegian) | Number of representatives |
|---|---|
| Labour Party (Arbeiderpartiet) | 21 |
| Conservative Party (Høyre) | 10 |
| Christian Democratic Party (Kristelig Folkeparti) | 1 |
| Red Electoral Alliance (Rød Valgallianse) | 1 |
| Centre Party (Senterpartiet) | 1 |
| Socialist Left Party (Sosialistisk Venstreparti) | 3 |
| Total number of members: | 37 |

Sør-Varanger kommunestyre 1979–1983
| Party name (in Norwegian) | Number of representatives |
|---|---|
| Labour Party (Arbeiderpartiet) | 18 |
| Conservative Party (Høyre) | 12 |
| Christian Democratic Party (Kristelig Folkeparti) | 1 |
| Centre Party (Senterpartiet) | 2 |
| Socialist Left Party (Sosialistisk Venstreparti) | 4 |
| Total number of members: | 37 |

Sør-Varanger kommunestyre 1975–1979
| Party name (in Norwegian) | Number of representatives |
|---|---|
| Labour Party (Arbeiderpartiet) | 19 |
| Conservative Party (Høyre) | 8 |
| Christian Democratic Party (Kristelig Folkeparti) | 2 |
| Centre Party (Senterpartiet) | 2 |
| Socialist Left Party (Sosialistisk Venstreparti) | 5 |
| Liberal Party (Venstre) | 1 |
| Total number of members: | 37 |

Sør-Varanger kommunestyre 1971–1975
| Party name (in Norwegian) | Number of representatives |
|---|---|
| Labour Party (Arbeiderpartiet) | 20 |
| Conservative Party (Høyre) | 8 |
| Christian Democratic Party (Kristelig Folkeparti) | 1 |
| Centre Party (Senterpartiet) | 2 |
| Liberal Party (Venstre) | 1 |
| Socialist common list (Venstresosialistiske felleslister) | 5 |
| Total number of members: | 37 |

Sør-Varanger kommunestyre 1969–1971
| Party name (in Norwegian) | Number of representatives |
|---|---|
| Labour Party (Arbeiderpartiet) | 20 |
| Conservative Party (Høyre) | 8 |
| Communist Party (Kommunistiske Parti) | 2 |
| Christian Democratic Party (Kristelig Folkeparti) | 1 |
| Centre Party (Senterpartiet) | 1 |
| Socialist People's Party (Sosialistisk Folkeparti) | 2 |
| Liberal Party (Venstre) | 3 |
| Total number of members: | 37 |

Sør-Varanger kommunestyre 1963–1967
| Party name (in Norwegian) | Number of representatives |
|---|---|
| Labour Party (Arbeiderpartiet) | 20 |
| Conservative Party (Høyre) | 9 |
| Communist Party (Kommunistiske Parti) | 4 |
| Christian Democratic Party (Kristelig Folkeparti) | 1 |
| Socialist People's Party (Sosialistisk Folkeparti) | 1 |
| Liberal Party (Venstre) | 2 |
| Total number of members: | 37 |

Sør-Varanger herredsstyre 1959–1963
| Party name (in Norwegian) | Number of representatives |
|---|---|
| Labour Party (Arbeiderpartiet) | 18 |
| Conservative Party (Høyre) | 6 |
| Communist Party (Kommunistiske Parti) | 6 |
| Christian Democratic Party (Kristelig Folkeparti) | 1 |
| Liberal Party (Venstre) | 1 |
| Local List(s) (Lokale lister) | 1 |
| Total number of members: | 33 |

Sør-Varanger herredsstyre 1955–1959
| Party name (in Norwegian) | Number of representatives |
|---|---|
| Labour Party (Arbeiderpartiet) | 16 |
| Conservative Party (Høyre) | 5 |
| Communist Party (Kommunistiske Parti) | 7 |
| Christian Democratic Party (Kristelig Folkeparti) | 1 |
| Liberal Party (Venstre) | 2 |
| Local List(s) (Lokale lister) | 2 |
| Total number of members: | 33 |

Sør-Varanger herredsstyre 1951–1955
| Party name (in Norwegian) | Number of representatives |
|---|---|
| Labour Party (Arbeiderpartiet) | 11 |
| Conservative Party (Høyre) | 4 |
| Communist Party (Kommunistiske Parti) | 7 |
| Liberal Party (Venstre) | 1 |
| List of workers, fishermen, and small farmholders (Arbeidere, fiskere, småbrukere liste) | 3 |
| Local List(s) (Lokale lister) | 2 |
| Total number of members: | 28 |

Sør-Varanger herredsstyre 1947–1951
| Party name (in Norwegian) | Number of representatives |
|---|---|
| Labour Party (Arbeiderpartiet) | 12 |
| Communist Party (Kommunistiske Parti) | 8 |
| Joint List(s) of Non-Socialist Parties (Borgerlige Felleslister) | 8 |
| Total number of members: | 28 |

Sør-Varanger herredsstyre 1945–1947
| Party name (in Norwegian) | Number of representatives |
|---|---|
| Labour Party (Arbeiderpartiet) | 12 |
| Communist Party (Kommunistiske Parti) | 10 |
| Local List(s) (Lokale lister) | 6 |
| Total number of members: | 28 |

Sør-Varanger herredsstyre 1937–1941*
| Party name (in Norwegian) | Number of representatives |
|---|---|
| Labour Party (Arbeiderpartiet) | 12 |
| Communist Party (Kommunistiske Parti) | 2 |
| List of workers, fishermen, and small farmholders (Arbeidere, fiskere, småbrukere liste) | 5 |
| Joint List(s) of Non-Socialist Parties (Borgerlige Felleslister) | 3 |
| Local List(s) (Lokale lister) | 6 |
| Total number of members: | 28 |
Note: Due to the German occupation of Norway during World War II, no elections were held for new municipal councils until after the war ended in 1945.

=== Mayors ===
The mayor (Norwegian: ordfører) of Sør-Varanger Municipality is the political leader of the municipality and the chairperson of the municipal council. Here is a list of people who have held this position:

- 1858–1860: Hans Kirkgaard
- 1861–1864: Christian Taftezon
- 1865–1868: Hans Figenschau
- 1869–1872: Johannes Belsheim
- 1873–1886: Anders Tokle
- 1887–1890: Edvard Bakken
- 1891–1894: Anders Tokle (V)
- 1895–1900: Emil Stang Lund (H)
- 1900–1904: Johannes Haaheim (V)
- 1905–1910: Andreas Bredal Wessel (Ap)
- 1911–1916: Mads Le Maire (LL)
- 1917–1919: Andreas Bergerud (LL)
- 1920–1922: Johan Hølvold (Ap)
- 1923–1925: Bjarne Sårheim (V)
- 1926–1928: Johan Hølvold (Ap)
- 1929–1931: Axel Borgen (V)
- 1923–1937: Sigurd Dørum (V)
- 1938–1940: Sverre Dølvik (Ap)
- 1944–1945: Sverre Dølvik (Ap)
- 1946–1947: Gotfred Johan Hølvold (NKP)
- 1948–1955: Harry Klippenvåg (Ap)
- 1950–1955: Hilmar Isaksen (Ap)
- 1956–1962: William Mikkelsen (Ap)
- 1962–1980: Arnt Isaksen (Ap)
- 1980–1982: Alfon Jerijärvi (Ap)
- 1982–1989: Nils-Edvard Olsen (Ap)
- 1990–1991: Halvard Kvamsdal (Ap)
- 1991–2003: Alfon Jerijärvi (Ap)
- 2003–2007: Tone Hatle (H)
- 2007–2011: Linda Beate Randal (Ap)
- 2011–2015: Cecilie Hansen (Sp)
- 2015–2021: Rune Rafaelsen (Ap)
- 2021–2023: Lena Norum Bergeng (Ap)
- 2023–present: Magnus Mæland (H)

== Transportation ==
Kirkenes Airport, Høybuktmoen is operated by the state-owned Avinor and serves as the main primary airport for eastern Finnmark county. Located 10 kilometers (6.2 mi) west of Kirkenes, at Høybuktmoen, the airport has a 2,115-meter (6,939 ft) long runway which allows Scandinavian Airlines and Norwegian Air Shuttle to operate direct flights to Oslo. In addition Widerøe uses the airport as a hub to regional airports throughout Finnmark.

The Kirkenes–Bjørnevatn Line is a 8.5-kilometer (5.3 mi) railway, until 2010 the world's northernmost, which runs between Kirkenes and Bjørnevatn;

The European route E6 highway has its northern endpoint in the town of Kirkenes. This highway heads west and then south to the rest of Norway. The European route E105 highway has its northern endpoint in the village of Hesseng, just south of Kirkenes. That highway heads south into Russia through the Storskog border crossing, the only legal public crossing on the Norway-Russia border.

== Religion ==
=== Churches ===
The Church of Norway has one parish (sokn) within Sør-Varanger Municipality. It is part of the Varanger prosti (deanery) in the Diocese of Nord-Hålogaland.

Churches in Sør-Varanger Municipality
| Parish (sokn) | Church name | Location of the church | Year built |
|---|---|---|---|
| Sør-Varanger | Bugøynes Chapel | Bugøynes | 1989 |
| Sør-Varanger | Kirkenes Church | Kirkenes | 1959 |
| Sør-Varanger | King Oscar II Chapel | Grense Jakobselv | 1869 |
| Sør-Varanger | Neiden Chapel | Neiden | 1902 |
| Sør-Varanger | Svanvik Church | Svanvik (in the Pasvikdalen valley) | 1934 |

== Archaeology ==
In 2015 rock carvings, estimatedly dated to 4200–5200 B.C. were found at Tømmerneset on Gamneset, several kilometers outside Kirkenes. The carvings were discovered along an old path used by reindeers—between two crags—by an archaeologist traveling between existing excavation sites at Gamneset. (A planned oil terminal will expectedly shut out the general public, from the site of the carvings.)

== Leisure ==
Popular leisure activities include salmon fishing in one of the numerous rivers, hunting for moose and grouse, and snowmobile driving. Many inhabitants also own and frequently use a cabin located in more remote parts of the municipality.

== Environmental issues ==
Environmental issues: The mining company Sydvaranger, got a renewal (2024) of their permit for discharges from mining; As of Q1 2026, a media outlet is saying that the government is doing case-work on a petition for having the permit rescinded.

== Notable people ==
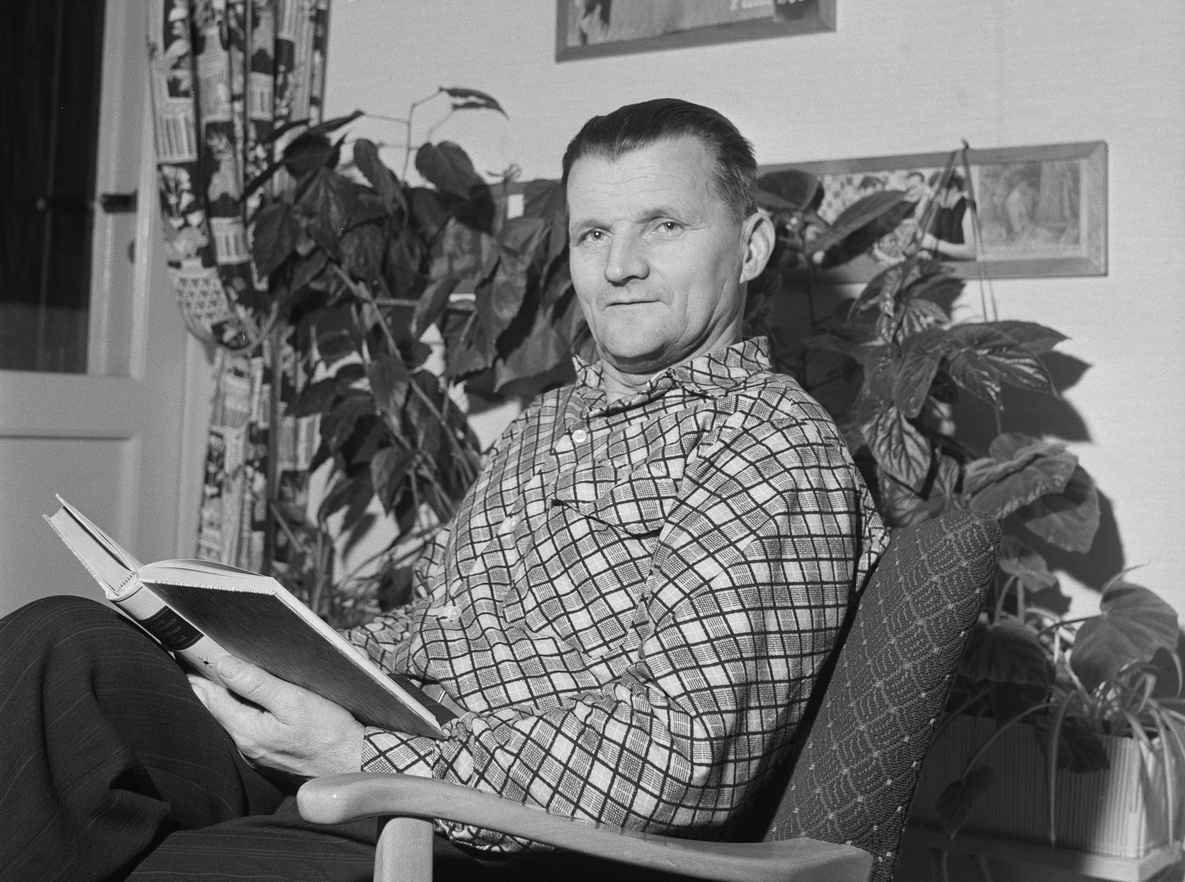
Osvald Harjo, 1958

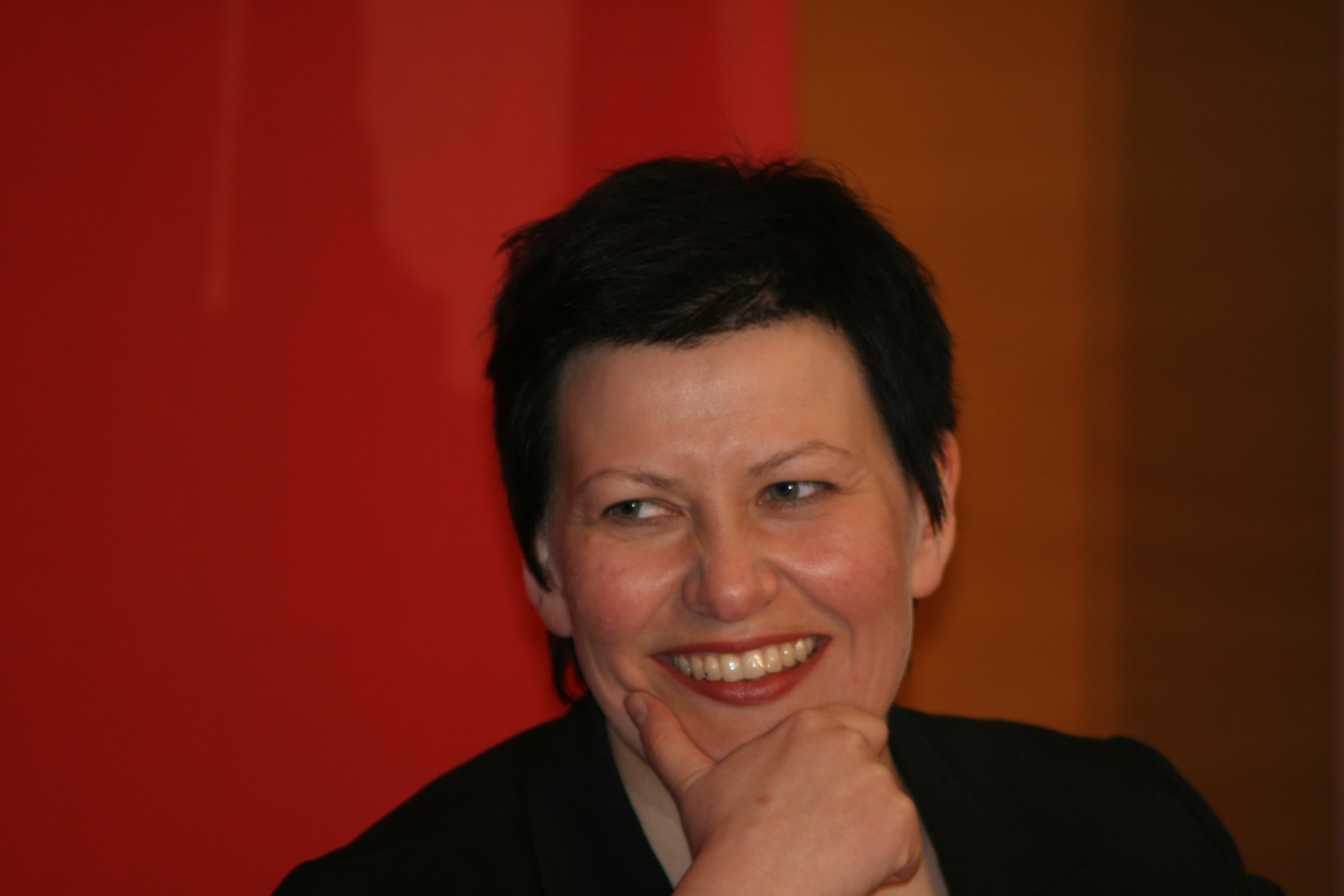
Helga Pedersen, 2009

- Kathrine Bugge (1877–1951), an educator, cultural worker, and politician who was brought up in Jarfjord
- John Savio (1902 in Bugøyfjord - 1938), an artist of Sami and Kven descent who made woodcuts
- Osvald Harjo (1910–1993), a resistance member in WWII and a prisoner in Soviet Gulag camps for over a decade
- Alfred Henningsen (1918 in Sør-Varanger – 2012), a military officer, spy, and politician
- Gudmund Grytøyr (born 1920 in Sør-Varanger - 2001), a sailor, laborer in industry and forestry, a farmer, and politician
- Annemarie Lorentzen (1921 in Sør-Varanger – 2008), a politician and Norwegian ambassador to Iceland from 1978 to 1985
- Aino Hivand (born 1947 in Bugøyfjord), a Norwegian-Sami visual artist and children's book writer
- Helga Pedersen (born 1973 in Sør-Varanger), a politician, former Minister, and member of the Storting who was brought up in Vestertana
- Pavel Zakharov (born 2001 in Sør-Varanger), a Russian college basketball player

== Gallery ==
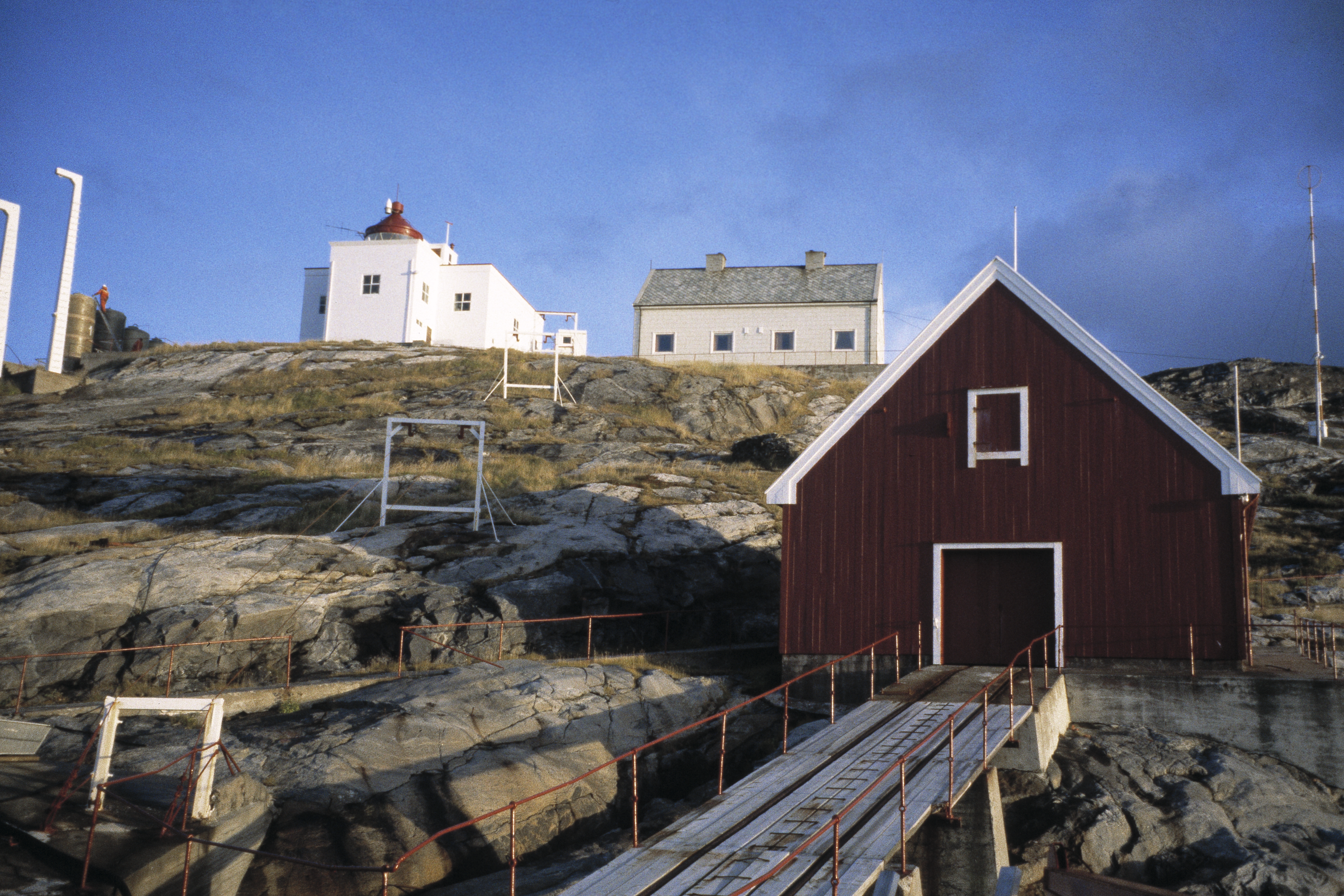
Bøkfjord lighthouse in Sør Varanger

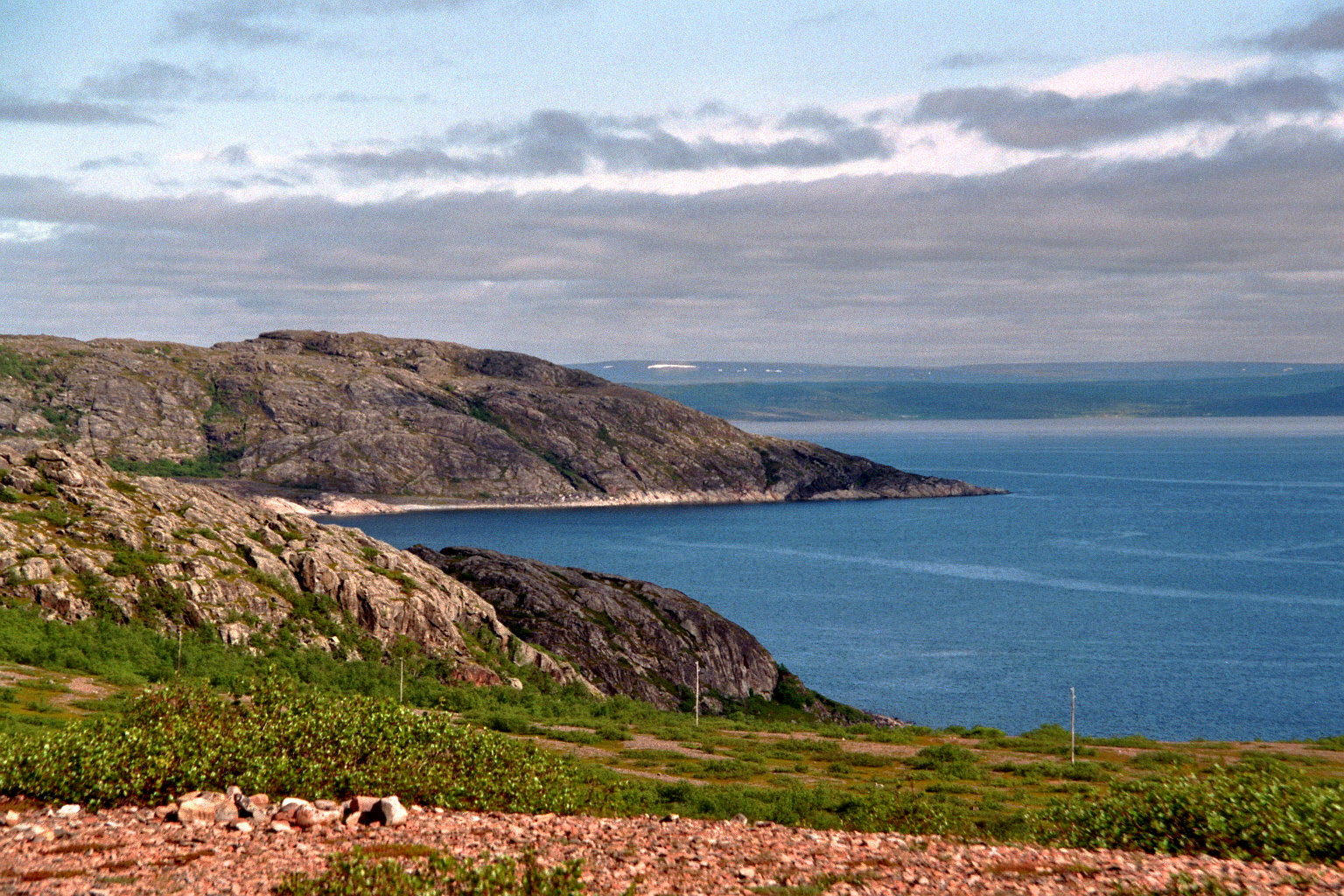
Jarfjord, seen from N886, Sør-Varanger

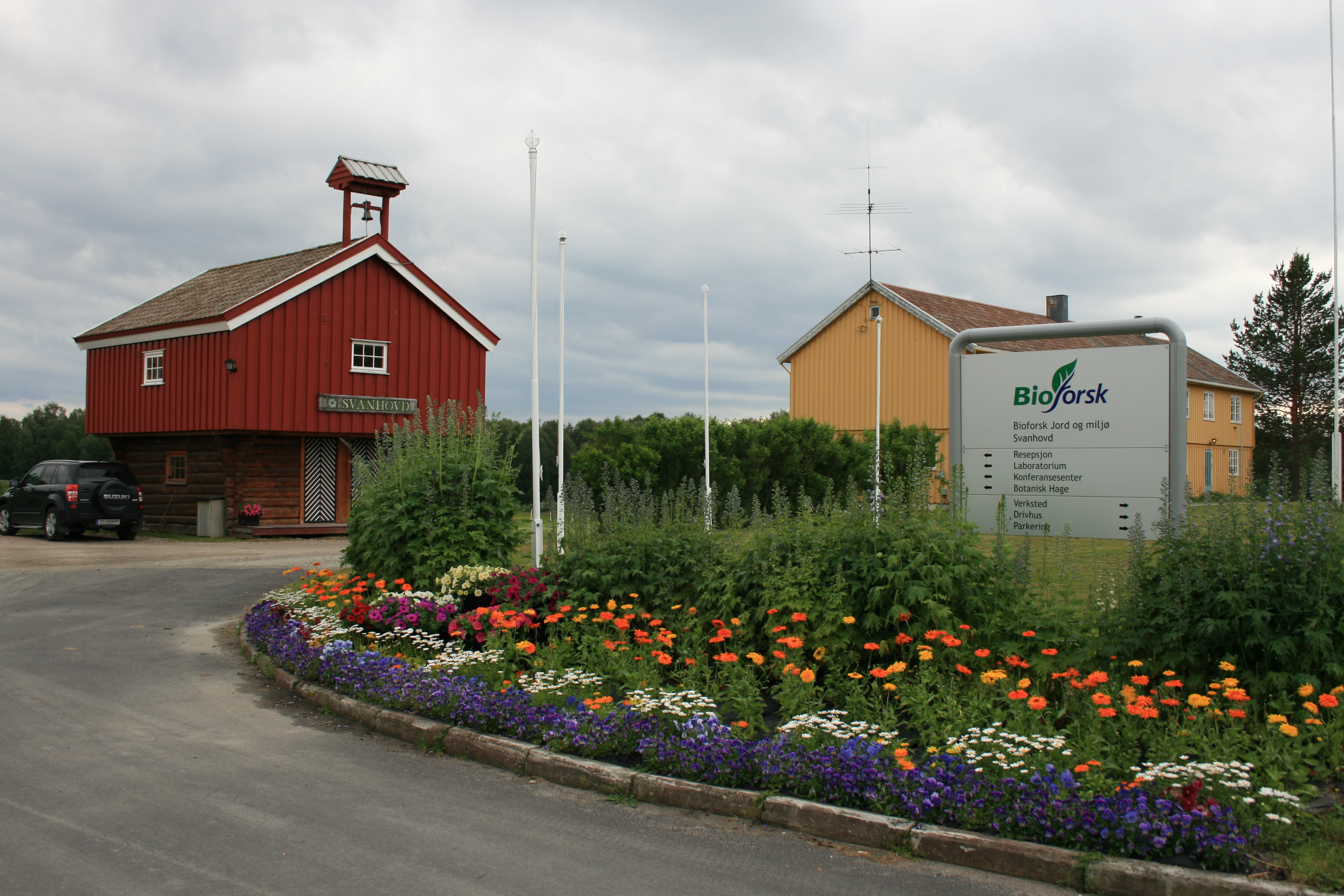
Svanhovd miljøsenter, Nasjonalparksenter, Bioforsk

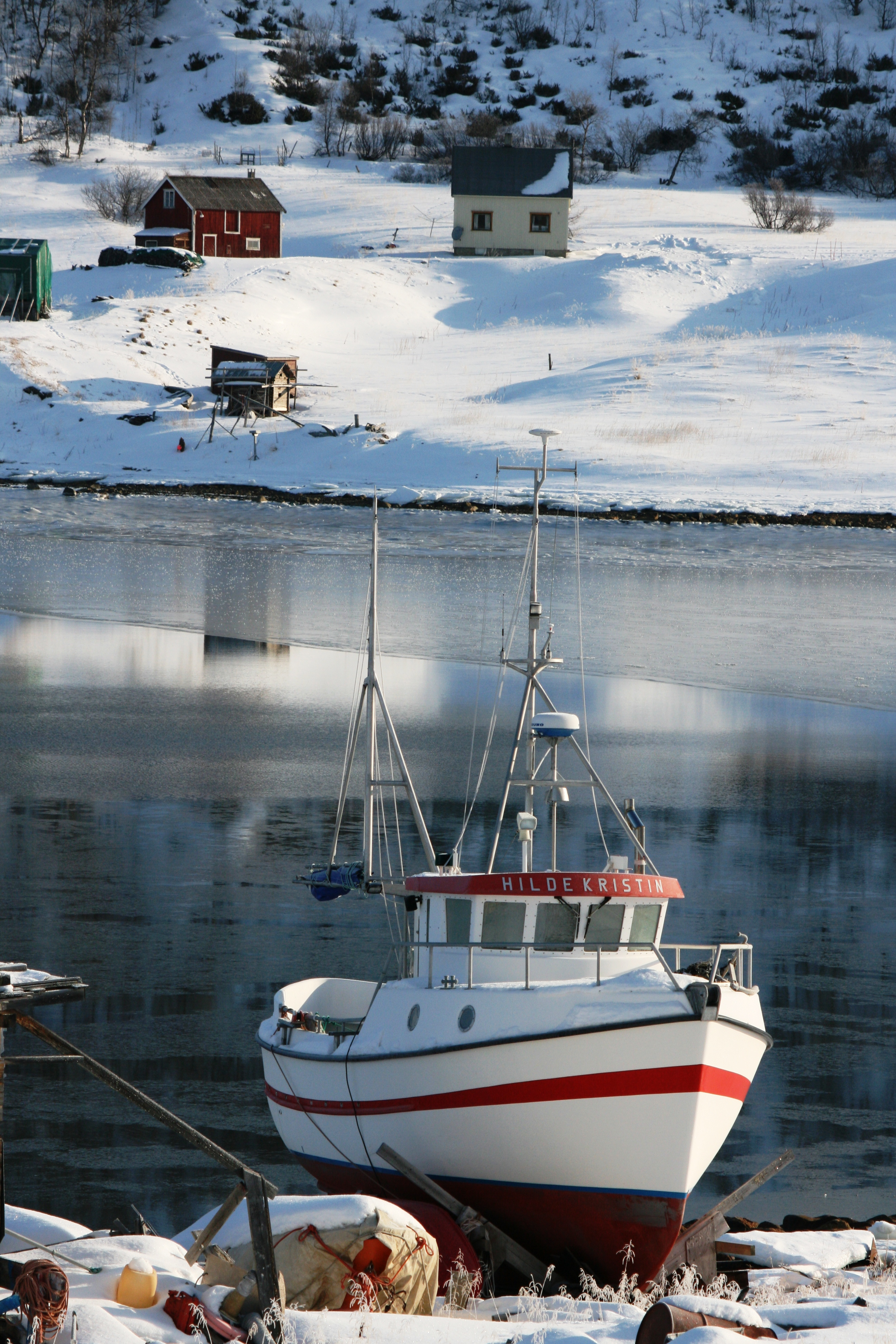
Hilde Kristin i vinteropplag

== See also ==
- Rock art at an eponymous place in a different county
