= Klistervatnet =

Lake on Norway/Russia border

Klistervatnet (Norwegian); Клистерватн (Russian)
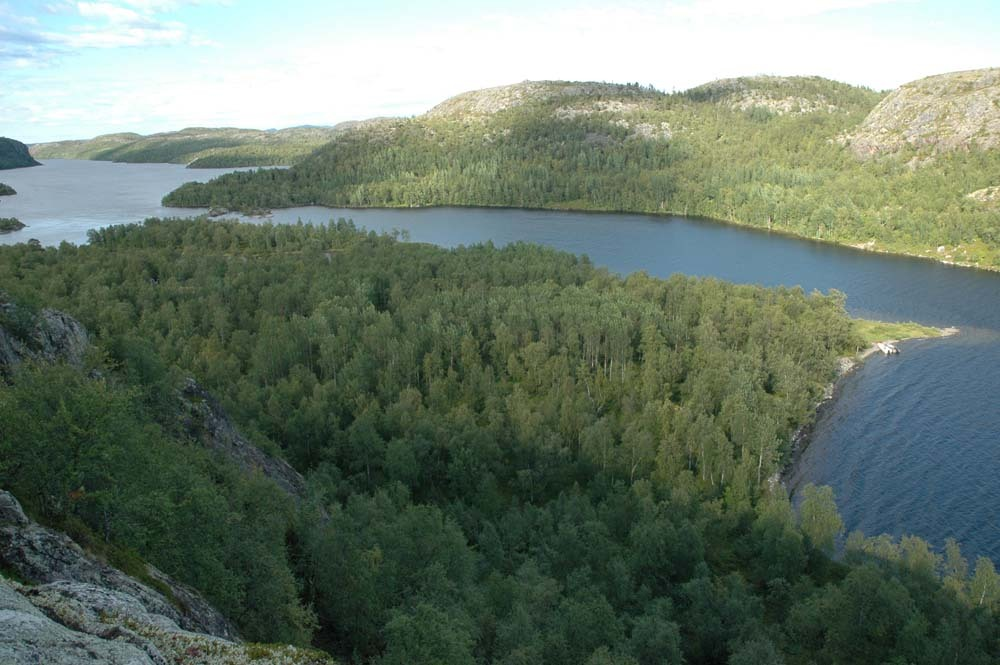
- Interactive map of the lake
- Location: Norway–Russia border
- Coordinates: 69.5738°N 30.1821°E
- Basin countries: Norway; Russia
- Max. length: 10 kilometres (6.2 mi)
- Max. width: 2 kilometres (1.2 mi)
- Surface area: 17.2 km^{2} (6.6 sq mi) (12.75 km² in Norway)
- Shore length^{1}: 51.91 kilometres (32.26 mi)
- Surface elevation: 25 metres (82 ft)
- References: NVE
- ^{1} Shore length is not a well-defined measure.

Klistervatnet (Norwegian) or Клистерватн (Russian) is a lake that lies on the border between Norway and Russia. The 17.2-square-kilometre (6.6 sq mi) lake lies on the river Pasvikelva in Sør-Varanger Municipality in Finnmark county, Norway and the Pechengsky District of Murmansk Oblast in Russia. The lake is about 10 kilometres (6.2 mi) long and 2 kilometres (1.2 mi) wide. The lake is located north of lake Bjørnevatnet.

== See also ==
- List of lakes in Norway
