= Garsjøen =

Lake in Sør-Varanger, Norway

Garsjøen (Norwegian); Gárddajávri (Northern Sami)
- Interactive map of the lake
- Location: Sør-Varanger Municipality, Finnmark
- Coordinates: 69.9179°N 28.9370°E
- Basin countries: Norway
- Max. length: 6.3 kilometres (3.9 mi)
- Max. width: 3.5 kilometres (2.2 mi)
- Surface area: 9.72 km^{2} (3.75 sq mi)
- Shore length^{1}: 28.62 kilometres (17.78 mi)
- Surface elevation: 250 metres (820 ft)
- References: NVE
- ^{1} Shore length is not a well-defined measure.

Garsjøen (Norwegian) or Gárddajávri (Northern Sami) is a lake in Sør-Varanger Municipality in Finnmark county, Norway. The 9.72-square-kilometre (3.75 sq mi) lake lies in the northwestern part of the municipality, about 15 kilometres (9.3 mi) northwest of the village of Bugøyfjord.

== See also ==
- List of lakes in Norway
