= Sandnes, Finnmark =

Village in Sør-Varanger, Norway

Sandnes: Kotajoki (Kven); Goađak (Northern Sami); Kueʹttjokk (Skolt Sami)
- Village
- Interactive map of Sandnes
- Location within Finnmark Location within Norway
- Coordinates: 69°40′11″N 29°56′43″E
- Country: Norway
- Region: Northern Norway
- County: Finnmark
- District: Øst-Finnmark
- Municipality: Sør-Varanger Municipality
- Elevation: 31 m (102 ft)
- Time zone: UTC+01:00 (CET)
  - Summer (DST): UTC+02:00 (CEST)
- Post Code: 9910 Bjørnevatn

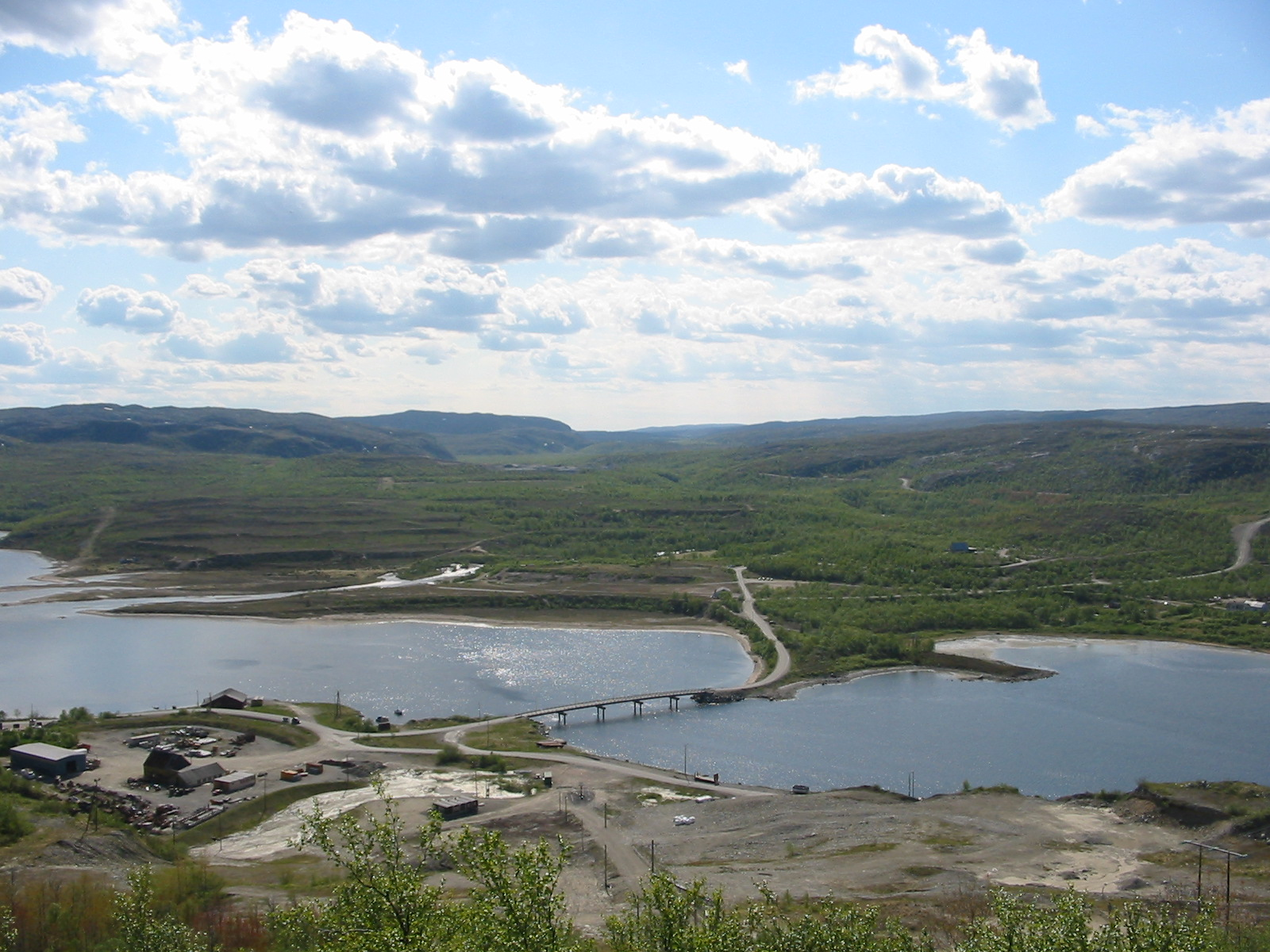

Sandnes (Norwegian), Kotajoki (Kven), Goađak (Northern Sami), or Kueʹttjokk (Skolt Sami) is a village in Sør-Varanger Municipality in Finnmark county, Norway. It is located about 10 kilometres (6.2 mi) south of the town of Kirkenes between the suburban villages of Bjørnevatn and Hesseng. Sandnes has its own primary school.

The local sports club, Sandnes IL, runs one of Finnmark's best cross country arenas. Sandnes also has an alpine skiing resort, run by the same sports club, which is called Sandnes Alpine Center.
