= Hesseng =

Hesseng: Hesseng (Norwegian); Hessenki (Kven)
- Village
- Interactive map of Hesseng
- Location within Finnmark Location within Norway
- Coordinates: 69°41′15″N 29°59′19″E
- Country: Norway
- Region: Northern Norway
- County: Finnmark
- District: Øst-Finnmark
- Municipality: Sør-Varanger Municipality

Area
  - Total: 1.16 km^{2} (0.45 sq mi)
- Elevation: 55 m (180 ft)

Population (2023)
  - Total: 1,636
  - Density: 1,410/km^{2} (3,700/sq mi)
- Time zone: UTC+01:00 (CET)
  - Summer (DST): UTC+02:00 (CEST)
- Post Code: 9912 Hesseng

Hesseng is a village in Sør-Varanger Municipality in Finnmark county, Norway. The village lies about 5 kilometres (3.1 mi) south of the town of Kirkenes. The village of Hesseng lies at the intersection of the European route E105 and European route E6 highways. The other suburbs of Sandnes and Bjørnevatn lie just to the south of Hesseng. The 1.16-square-kilometre (290-acre) village has a population (2023) of 1,636 and a population density of 1,410 inhabitants per square kilometre (3,700/sq mi).
