= Skogerøytoppen =

Mountain on the island of Skogerøya in Norway

Skogerøytoppen (Norwegian); Ákkelgáisá (Northern Sami)
- Location of the mountain

Highest point
- Elevation: 445 m (1,460 ft)
- Prominence: 445 m (1,460 ft)
- Coordinates: 69°52′31″N 29°51′35″E

Geography
- Location: Finnmark, Norway

Skogerøytoppen (Norwegian) or Ákkelgáisá (Northern Sami) is the highest mountain on the island of Skogerøya in Sør-Varanger Municipality in Finnmark county, Norway. At 445 metres (1,460 ft) tall, it is the fifth-highest point in the municipality. Skogerøytoppen lies on the northern part of the island, overlooking the large Varangerfjorden.
