= Bjørnevatn =

Bjørnevatn: Bjørnevatn (Norwegian); Kuõbǯǯjäuʹrr (Skolt Sami); Guovžajávri (Northern Sami); Kruuvakylä (Kven)
- Village
- Interactive map of Bjørnevatn
- Location within Finnmark Location within Norway
- Coordinates: 69°40′02″N 29°59′16″E
- Country: Norway
- Region: Northern Norway
- County: Finnmark
- District: Øst-Finnmark
- Municipality: Sør-Varanger Municipality

Area
  - Total: 1.99 km^{2} (0.77 sq mi)
- Elevation: 53 m (174 ft)

Population (2023)
  - Total: 2,536
  - Density: 1,274/km^{2} (3,300/sq mi)
- Time zone: UTC+01:00 (CET)
  - Summer (DST): UTC+02:00 (CEST)
- Post Code: 9910 Bjørnevatn

Bjørnevatn (Norwegian), Kuõbǯǯjäuʹrr (Skolt Sami), Guovžajávri (Northern Sami), or Kruuvakylä (Kven) is a village in Sør-Varanger Municipality in Finnmark county, Norway. The village lies about 8 kilometres (5.0 mi) south of the town of Kirkenes and about 3.8 kilometres (2.4 mi) west of the Norway-Russia border. The village has a couple of suburbs including Hesseng to the north and Sandnes to the west. The Bjørnevatn IL is the local sports team. The name Bjørnevatn translates to "Bear Lake" in English.

The 1.99-square-kilometre (490-acre) village has a population (2023) of 2,536 and a population density of 1,274 inhabitants per square kilometre (3,300/sq mi).

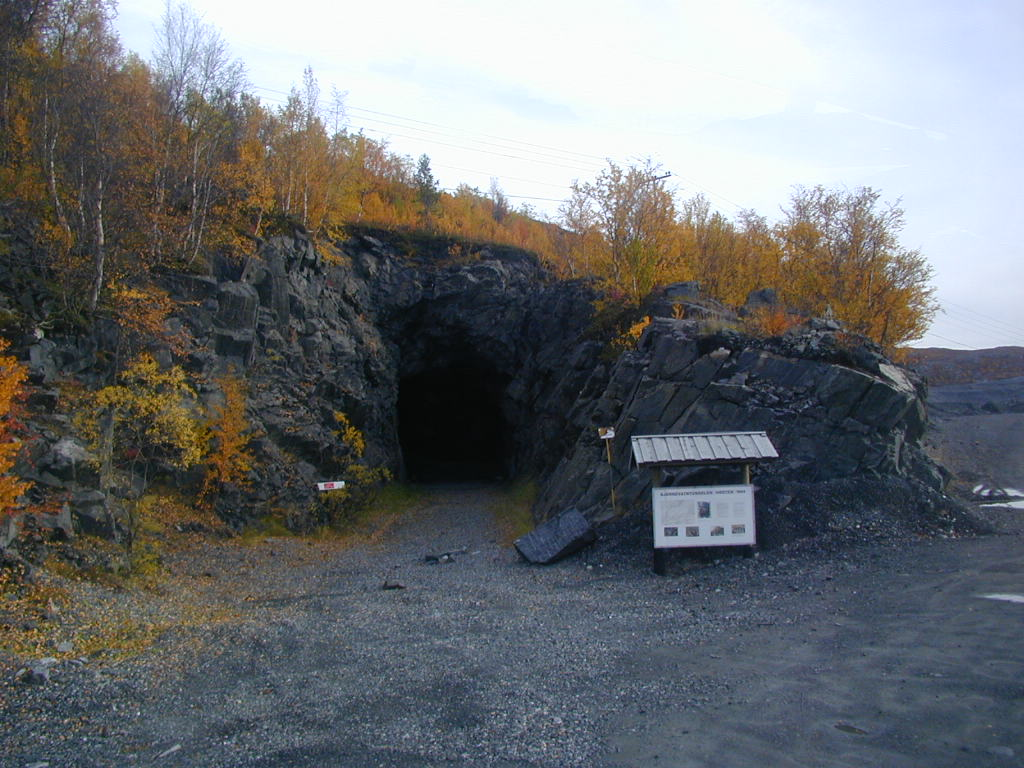
Bjørnevatn Tunnel

== Mine ==
The bedrock below Bjørnevatn is located in the East Finnmark mountain formation (Øst-Finnmarks grunnfjellsområde). Iron ore deposits were originally discovered in the area during 1868 with commercial production of iron ore by 1910. The Sydvaranger iron ore mines are located just south of Bjørnevatn. The Kirkenes–Bjørnevatn Line is a short railway line that runs from the mines to the town and port at Kirkenes to the north.

== History ==
The village used to be located near the shores of the lake Bjørnevatnet, but the lake was drained in 1958 so that the iron ore under the lake could be mined. During the liberation in 1944 at the end of World War II, a large number of people lived inside the mines during the fighting; estimates vary between 1,000 and 3,500. Their story is portrayed in the 1974 film Under a Stone Sky.
