= Gudmund Grytøyr =

Norwegian politician

Gudmund Grytøyr (born 15 July 1920 in Sør-Varanger Municipality died 21 July 2001) was a Norwegian politician for the Labour Party.

He was elected to the Norwegian Parliament from Nordland in 1977, and was re-elected on one occasion. He had previously served as a deputy representative during the terms 1958–1961, 1961–1965, 1965–1969, 1969–1973 and 1973–1977.

On the local level he was a member of the municipal council for Leiranger Municipality from 1955 to 1964, and then he was a member of the municipal council for Steigen Municipality from 1964 to 1971 and 1975 to 1979. He chaired the local party chapter from 1953 to 1968.

Outside politics he worked as a sailor, a laborer in industry and forestry, and a farmer.
