= Nedre Gärdsjö =

- Location within Dalarna Location within Sweden
- Coordinates: 60°56′N 15°13′E
- Country: Sweden
- Province: Dalarna
- County: Dalarna County
- Municipality: Rättvik Municipality

Area
  - Total: 0.67 km^{2} (0.26 sq mi)

Population (31 December 2010)
  - Total: 225
  - Density: 334/km^{2} (870/sq mi)
- Time zone: UTC+1 (CET)
  - Summer (DST): UTC+2 (CEST)

Nedre Gärdsjö is a locality situated in Rättvik Municipality, Dalarna County, Sweden with 225 inhabitants in 2010.
