= Grense Jakobselv =

Village in Sør-Varanger, Norway

Grense Jakobselv: Grense Jakobselv (Norwegian); Vueʹrjemjokk (Skolt Sami); Vuoremijoki (Kven); Vuorjám (Northern Sami); Гренсе Якобсэльв (Russian)
- Village
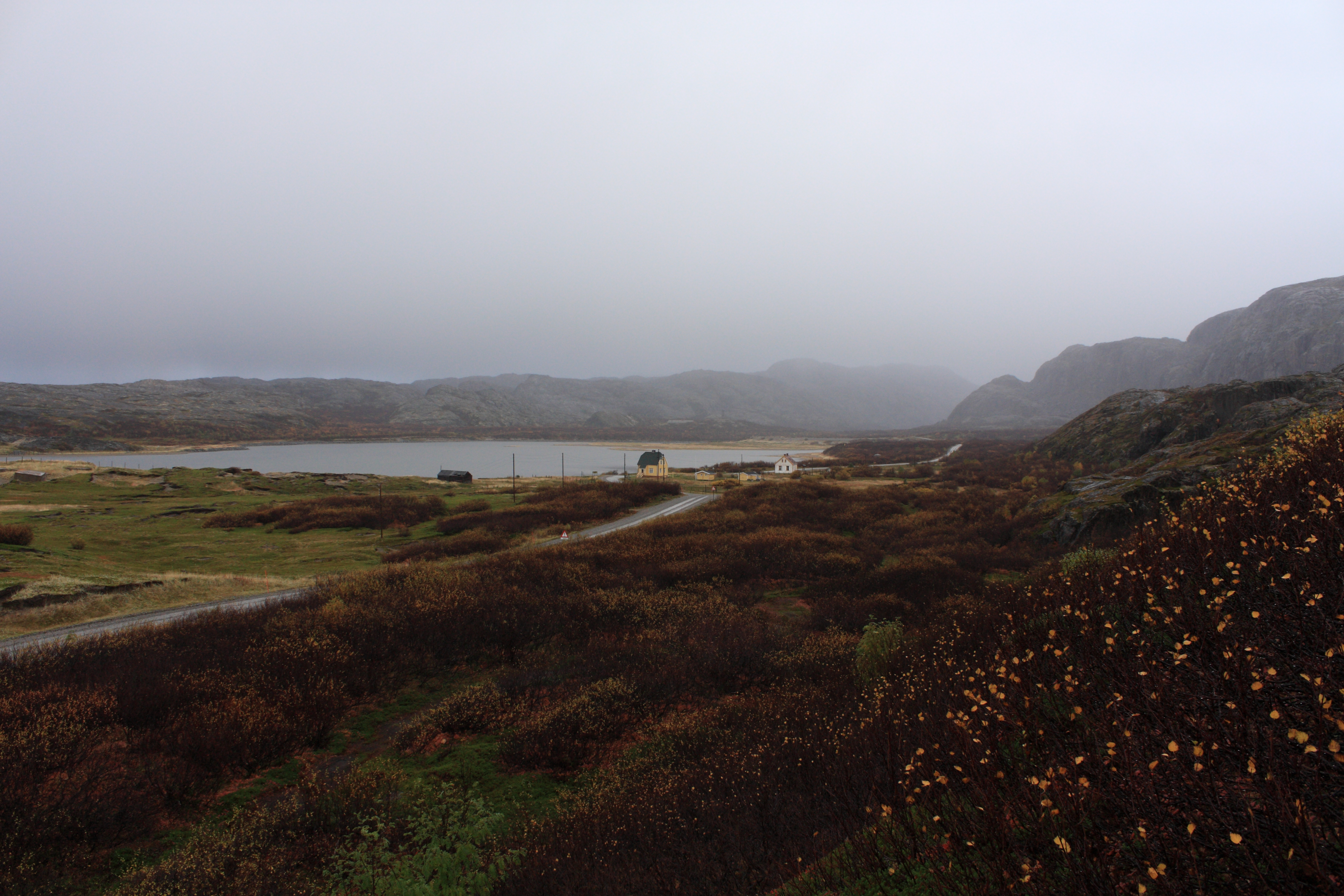
- A southbound picture of Grense Jakobselv village; the left side of the river belongs to Russia and the right side to Norway.
- Interactive map of Grense Jakobselv
- Location in Finnmark Grense Jakobselv (Norway)
- Coordinates: 69°46′30″N 30°49′52″E
- Country: Norway
- Region: Northern Norway
- County: Finnmark
- District: Øst-Finnmark
- Municipality: Sør-Varanger Municipality
- Elevation: 5 m (16 ft)
- Time zone: UTC+01:00 (CET)
  - Summer (DST): UTC+02:00 (CEST)
- Post Code: 9900 Kirkenes

Grense Jakobselv (Norwegian), Vueʹrjemjokk (Skolt Sami), or Vuoremijoki (Kven) (also: Vuorjánjohka (Northern Sami) and Гренсе Якобсэльв (Russian)) is a small village in Sør-Varanger Municipality in Finnmark county, Norway. It is located on the shore of the Barents Sea at the mouth of the Jakobselva river. It lies about 54 kilometres (34 mi) by road east of the town of Kirkenes. The area was settled by Norwegians in 1851.

== Border with Russia ==
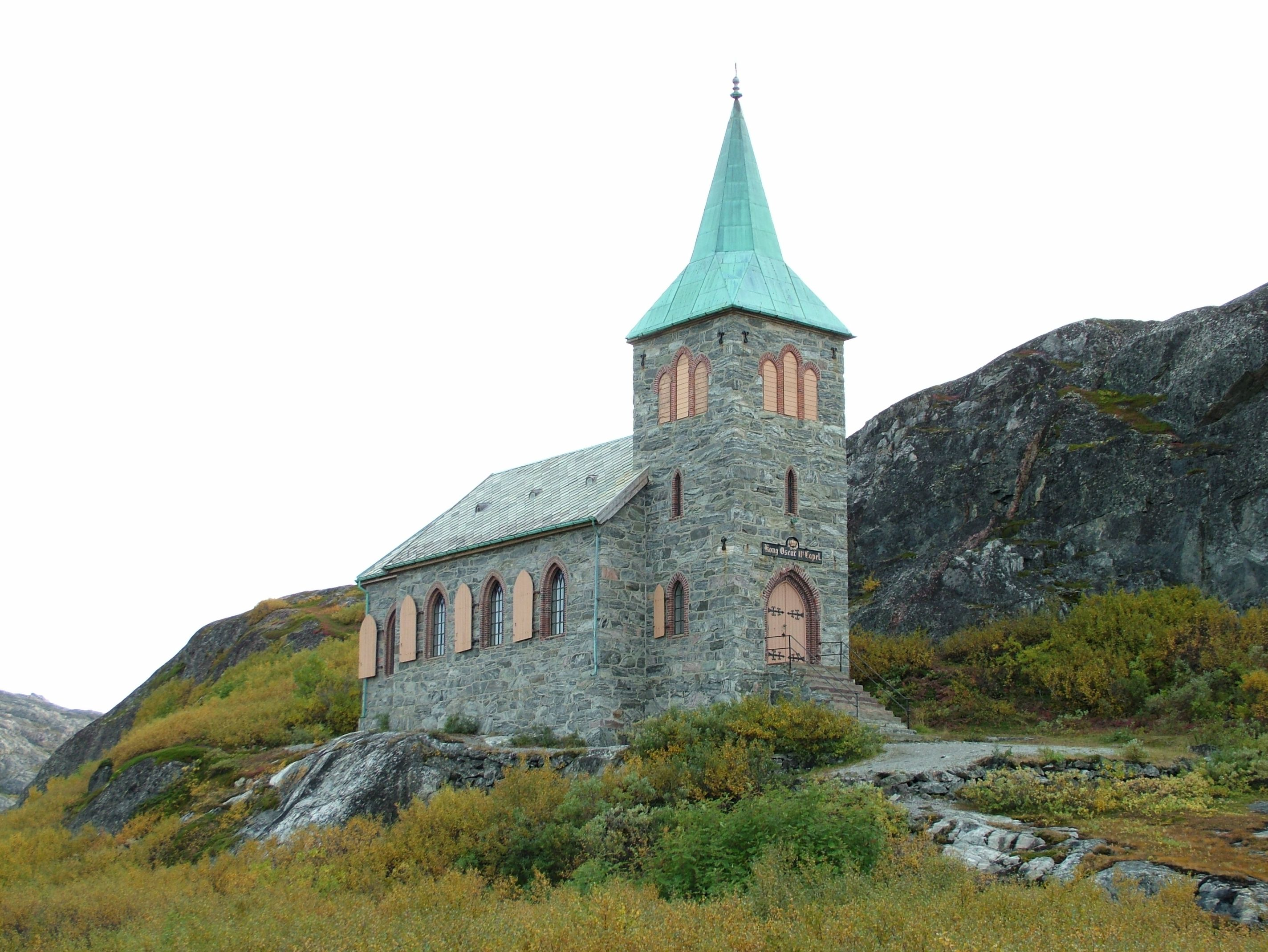
King Oscar II Chapel

The Jakobselva river forms the border with Russia, on the east side of Grense Jakobselv. Here, there is a small post of the Garrison of Sør-Varanger of the Norwegian Army, from where soldiers patrol the border. In this area, however, there is no public border crossing.

== King Oscar II Chapel ==
In the village, there is a stone chapel built in 1869 called King Oscar II Chapel. The church was built to reinforce Norway's territorial claim to the area, and was named after King Oscar II of Sweden and Norway at a visit he made in 1873.

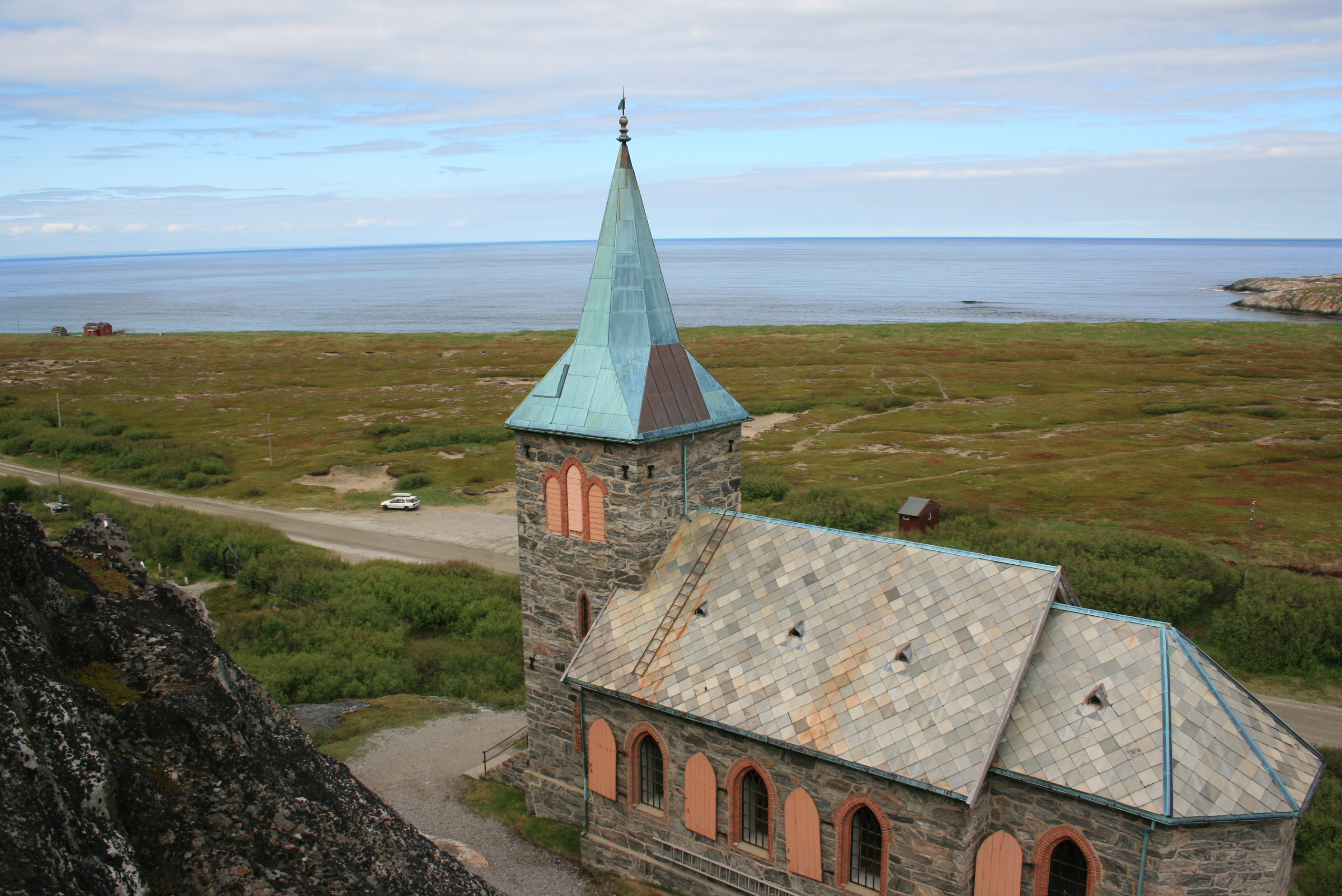
Alternate view of the chapel

== Distance from Oslo ==
Grense Jakobselv is the point in mainland Norway furthest by national road from Norway's capital Oslo. It is 2,465 kilometres (1,532 mi) by a route entirely within Norway. If international routes are included, the distance is roughly 1,955 kilometres (1,215 mi) (510 kilometres (320 mi) shorter), travelling through the neighbouring countries of Sweden and Finland. In this scenario, Gamvik would be the furthest place from Oslo (2,040 kilometres (1,270 mi)).
