= Holmengrå, Finnmark =

Holmengrå
- Cultural Heritage Site; Fishing village
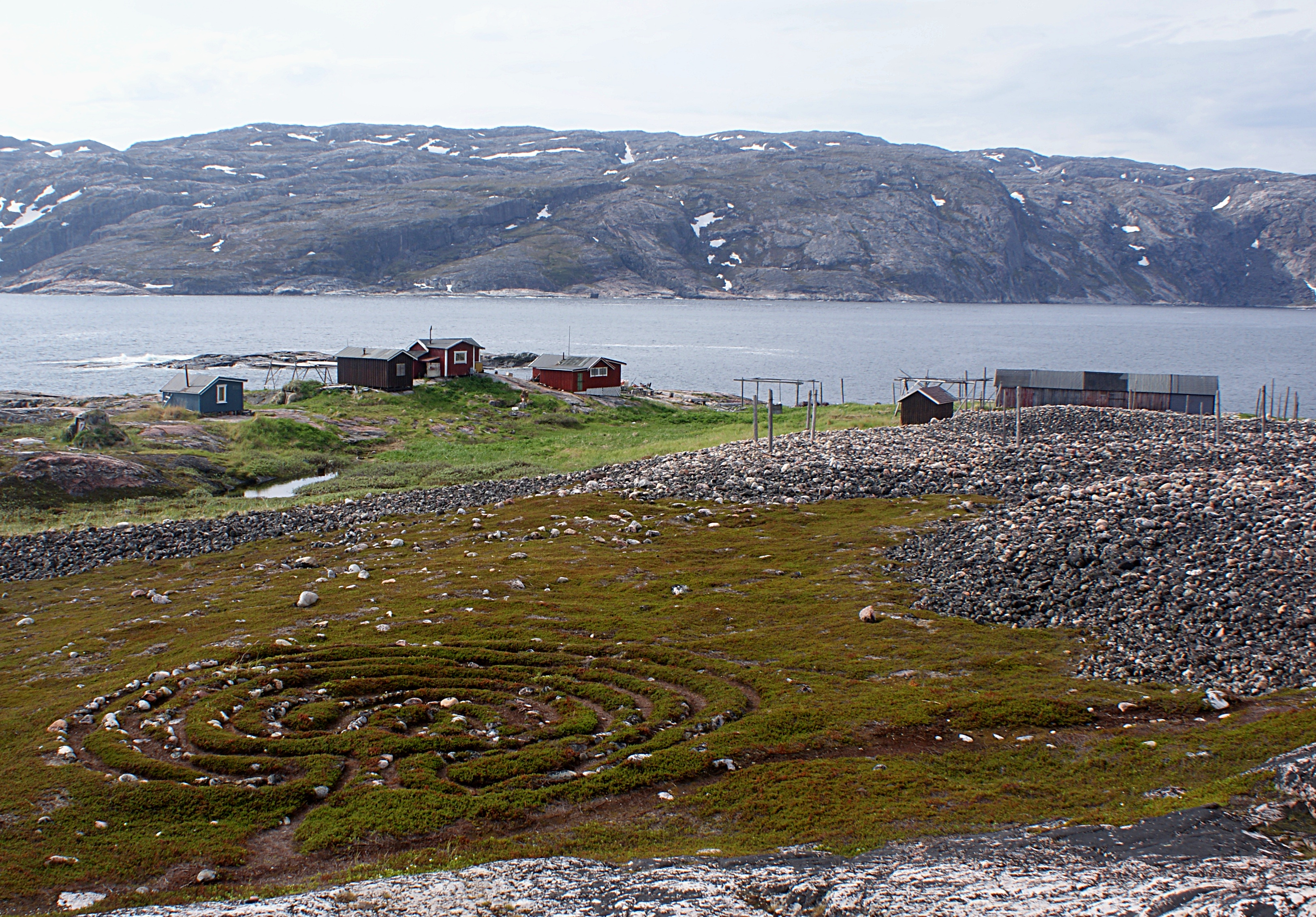
- View of the village with the labyrinth in the foreground
- Interactive map of Holmengrå
- Location within Finnmark Location within Norway
- Coordinates: 69°51′11″N 30°17′58″E
- Country: Norway
- Region: Northern Norway
- County: Finnmark
- District: Øst-Finnmark
- Municipality: Sør-Varanger Municipality
- Time zone: UTC+01:00 (CET)
  - Summer (DST): UTC+02:00 (CEST)

Holmengrå is the name a small fishing village in Sør-Varanger Municipality in Finnmark county, Norway. The village lies on a small area of flat land along the Holmengråfjorden (an arm off the Varangerfjorden). The 265-metre (869 ft) tall mountain Holmengråfjellet lies just west of the village. The area is rocky with poor boat access. There is some grass and heather around the village, but the ground is mostly rocks.

== History ==
The village was established in 1880 by Kven immigrants from Finland. It was populated until 1970. It was protected by the Cultural Heritage Act in 1998. Now there are 8 housing units and it is only seasonally used for fishing cabins. The village is owned by the state and managed by the Finnmark Estate.

At Holmengrå, there is a maze that dates back to approximately 1000–1600 AD, probably of Eastern Sami origin.
