= Jakobselva (Sør-Varanger) =

Jakobselva Ворьема / Vuoremijoki / Vuorjám
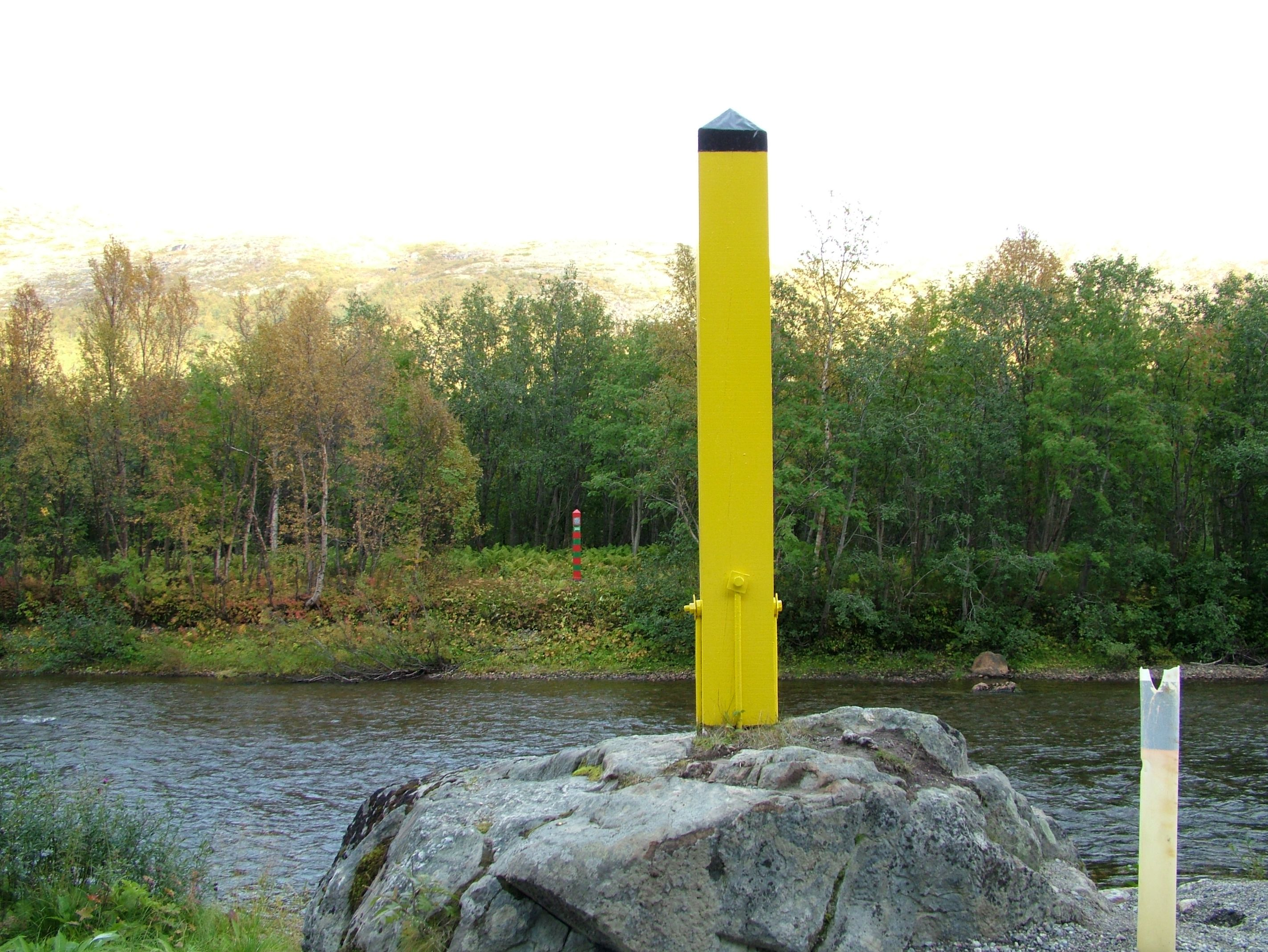
- View of border markers along the river
- Interactive map of the river

Location
- Country: Norway, Russia
- Region: Finnmark county, Murmansk Oblast

Physical characteristics
- Source: Vuorjánláđvi
  - location: Grensefjellet, Finnmark, Norway
  - coordinates: 69°32′47″N 30°42′09″E
  - elevation: 344 m (1,129 ft)
- Mouth: Varangerfjorden
  - location: Grense Jakobselv, Finnmark, Norway
  - coordinates: 69°46′53″N 30°49′08″E
  - elevation: 0 m (0 ft)
- Length: 45 km (28 mi)
- Basin size: 236.44 km^{2} (91.29 sq mi)
- Discharge
  - average: 4.13 m^{3}/s (146 cu ft/s)

The Jakobselva or Grense Jakobselv (lit. Jacob's River; Russian: Ворьема, Vor'yema; Skolt Sami: Vue'rjemjokk; Kven: Vuoremijoki; Northern Sami: Vuorjám) is a river that runs along the Russia-Norway border. The river runs along the border of Sør-Varanger Municipality in Finnmark county, Norway, and Pechengsky District in Murmansk Oblast, Russia. The river discharges into the Varangerfjorden, a bay off the Barents Sea.

This river is known as a superb salmon fishing river, but where the river forms the border only Norwegian citizens and long-term residents of Norway are permitted to fish, and then only on the Norwegian side of the river (fishing license needed). The Russian side is normally not accessible, something which is a general rule for all the Russian border to Norway and Finland.

The Jakobselva lends its name to the small village of Grense Jakobselv, near the mouth of the river in Norway.
