= Norway–Russia border barrier =

International border

The Norway–Russia border barrier is an international border barrier built by Norway on the Norway–Russia border. Construction of the barrier began in September 2016 and took a few months. The intent of the project was to prevent the smuggling and illegal crossing of migrants from the Middle East, mainly from Syria, who have used Russia as a route of entry into Norway (and thus into the European Union's passport-free Schengen Area).

== Background ==
In 2016, 5,500 asylum-seekers illegally entered Norway from Russia. Because it is illegal to drive from Russia to Norway without proper legal permission, and crossing on foot is prohibited, the migrants make the crossing on bicycles. At the end of September 2016, it was discovered that some foundations have to be moved, since the border treaty says that there shall be no built object within two meters (79 inches) from the border on each side, and some foundations were built up to 15 cm (6 in) too close to the border.

== Barrier ==
The barrier is located at the Storskog border crossing. It is built of steel and stands 200 metres (660 ft) long and 3.5 metres (11 ft) high. The fence includes a gate for the road traffic, built so people cannot walk through it when it is closed.

== Juxtaposed border control ==
An agreement is in place that the Russian border control do not allow people to cross the border if they do not have proper visas into Norway. This means that they cannot apply for asylum since they never reach Norway. In doubtful cases, Norwegian border police are allowed to see the passports while the bearer has to wait in the Russian station. This is the background for the barrier, preventing people from escaping the station and running to Norway.

== Incidents ==
On 15 August 2017, a Syrian citizen ran through the Russian border control and tried to climb over the fence. Russian Border Guards stopped him. In July 2017 two persons were arrested by Russian guards for trying to pass the border outside the station.

== Old barrier ==
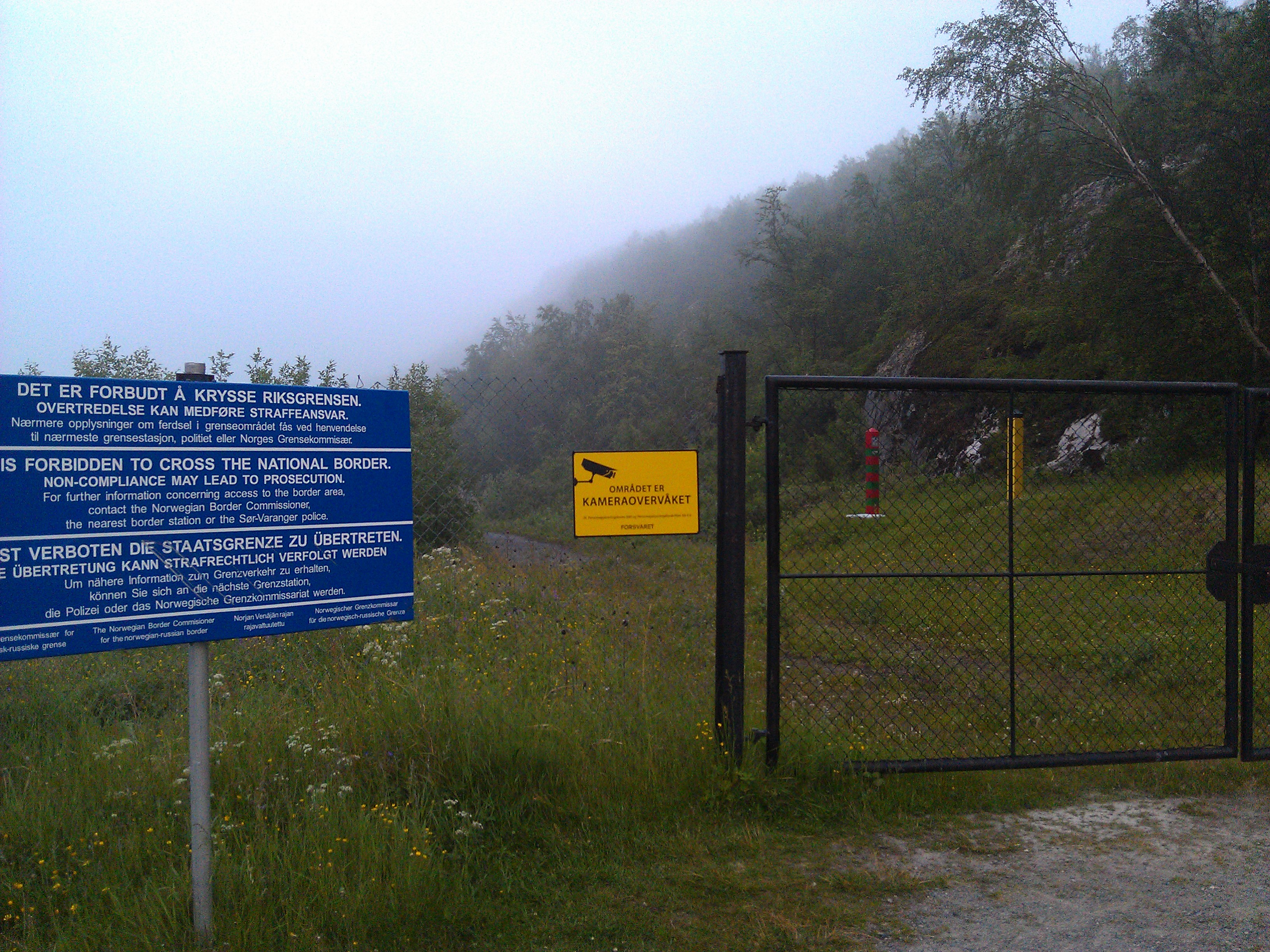
The Norwegian-Russian border, seen from Skafferhullet, Norway, with a Norwegian fence.

There exists an older barrier at the old border control site at Skafferhullet near the Pasvik river 4 km west of Storskog and only accessible for authorised traffic. It was probably built around 1960 when the road was used for construction of the Borisoglebsky hydroelectric station, or in connection with the Skafferhullet controversy in 1965 when Soviet Union opened a taxfree shop there which made Norway close the border. This border crossing was passable for general public before 1940 and again in 1965.

Furthermore, there are fences around the Pasvik River hydroelectric stations, of which some are located on the border. These fences are not considered to be border fences, but private installation fences.

== Russian barrier ==
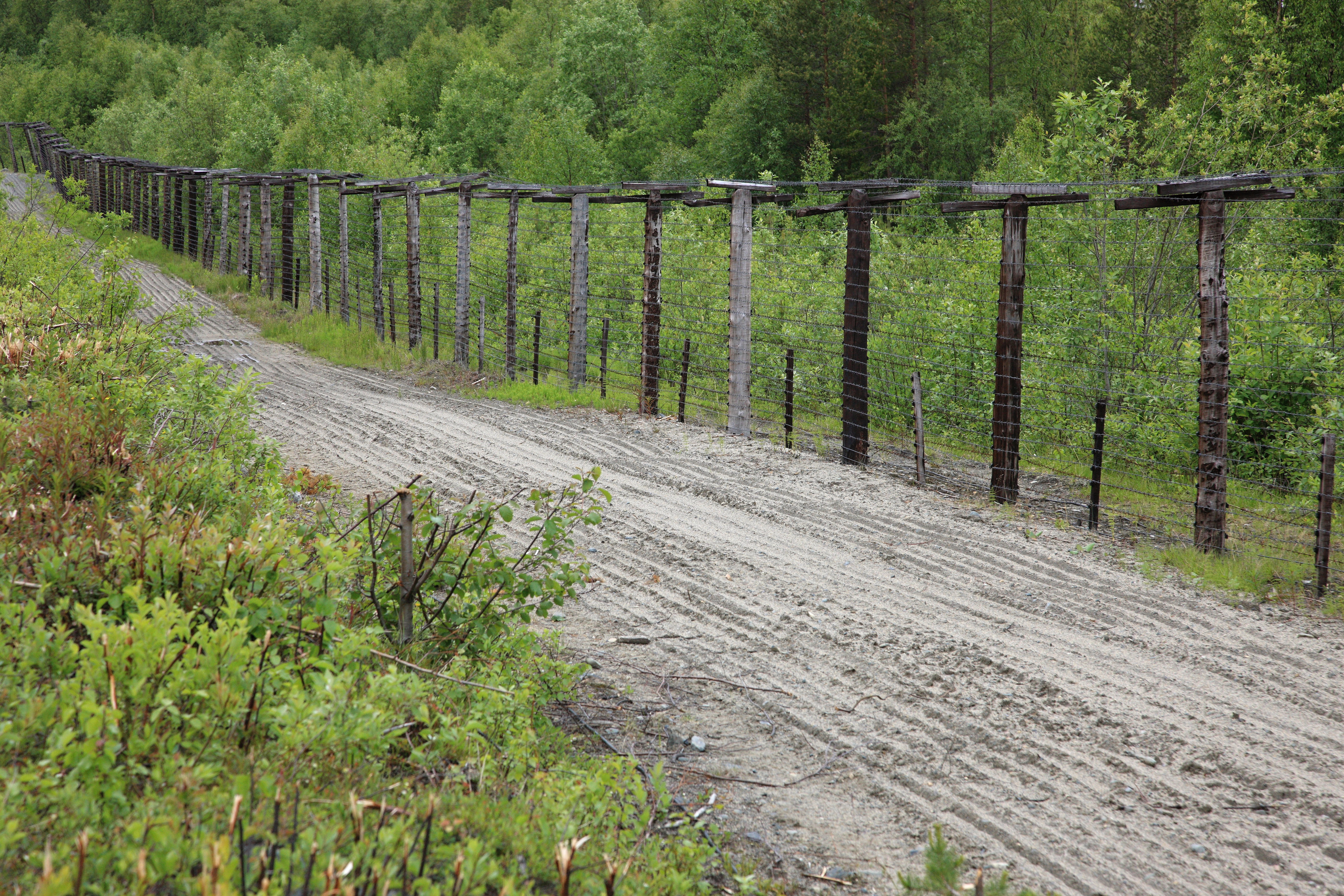
Russian fence near the border to Norway

There is a fence along the entire Russian border to Norway and Finland, built by the Soviet Union. It is located one or a few kilometres from the border, and has automatic alarms detecting if someone climbs over it. There is a simple gravel road along both entire borders, permitted only for border guards and other authorised people, enabling quick response if an alarm goes off. The gravel road along the fence is covered by sand in order to get foot prints to trace trespassers.

== See also ==
- Border barrier for a list of border barriers
- Norway–Russia border
- Austrian border barrier
- Bulgarian border barrier
- Greek border barrier
- Hungarian border barrier
- Macedonian border barrier
- Slovenian border barrier
- Removal of Hungary's border fence with Austria
- Russia–Ukraine barrier
