= Skafferhullet =

- Former border station
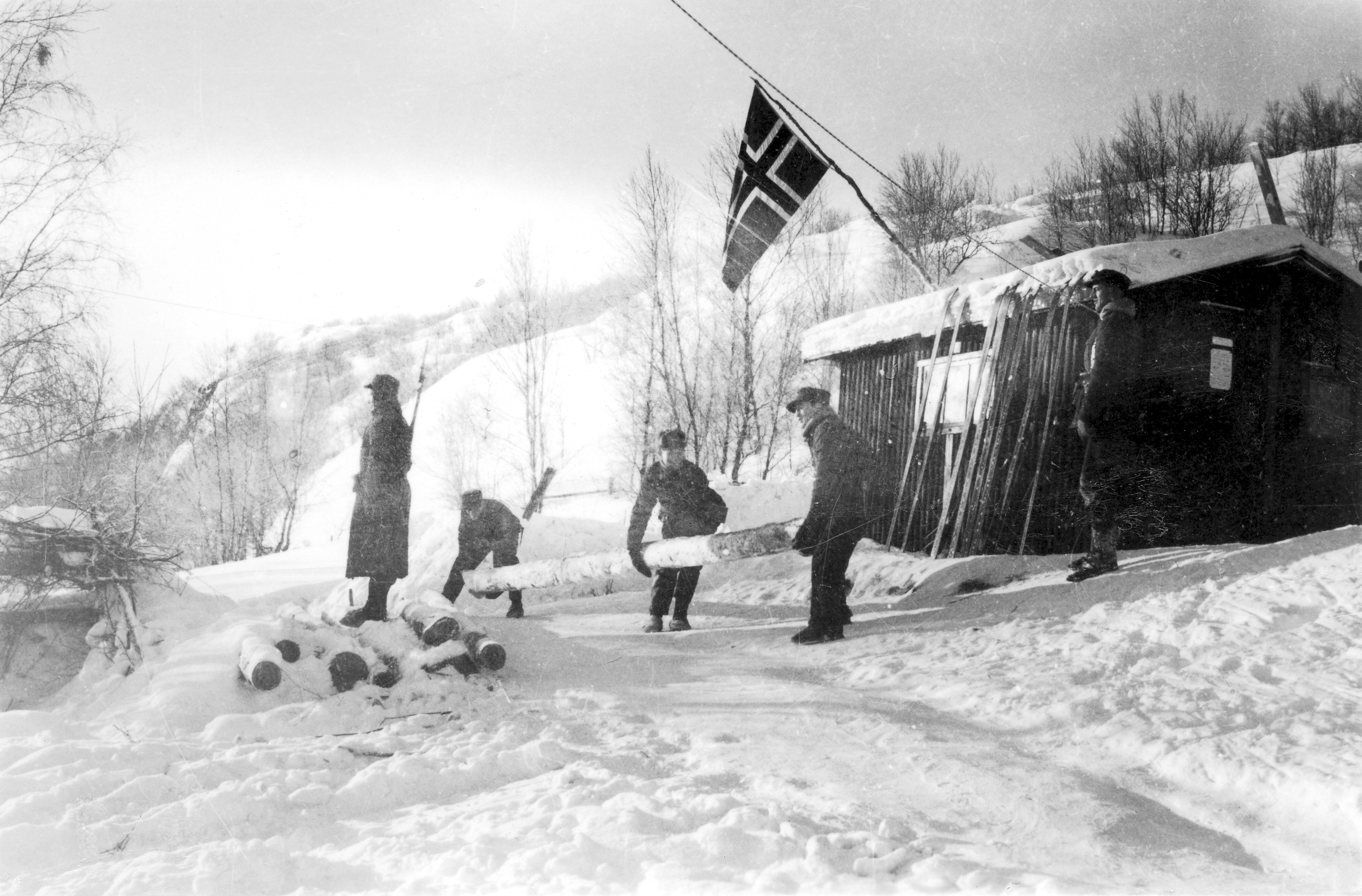
- Soldiers at Skafferhullet at the Finland–Norway border in 1940.

- Location in Finnmark
- Coordinates: 69°39′54″N 30°07′12″E
- Country: Norway
- Region: Northern Norway
- County: Finnmark
- District: Øst-Finnmark
- Municipality: Sør-Varanger Municipality
- Elevation: 29 m (95 ft)
- Time zone: UTC+01:00 (CET)
  - Summer (DST): UTC+02:00 (CEST)

Skafferhullet is a historical border crossing point along the Norway–Russia border (formerly it was on the Finland–Norway border and Soviet–Norway border). The border crossing site was located on the old road between Elvenes in Sør-Varanger Municipality, Finnmark county, Norway and Borisoglebsky in Murmansk Oblast, Russia. The station lies on the western shore of the Pasvikelva river.

Since this site is now closed, the only other border crossing from Norway into Russia is at the nearby border crossing at Storskog on the newer European route E105 highway.

== History ==
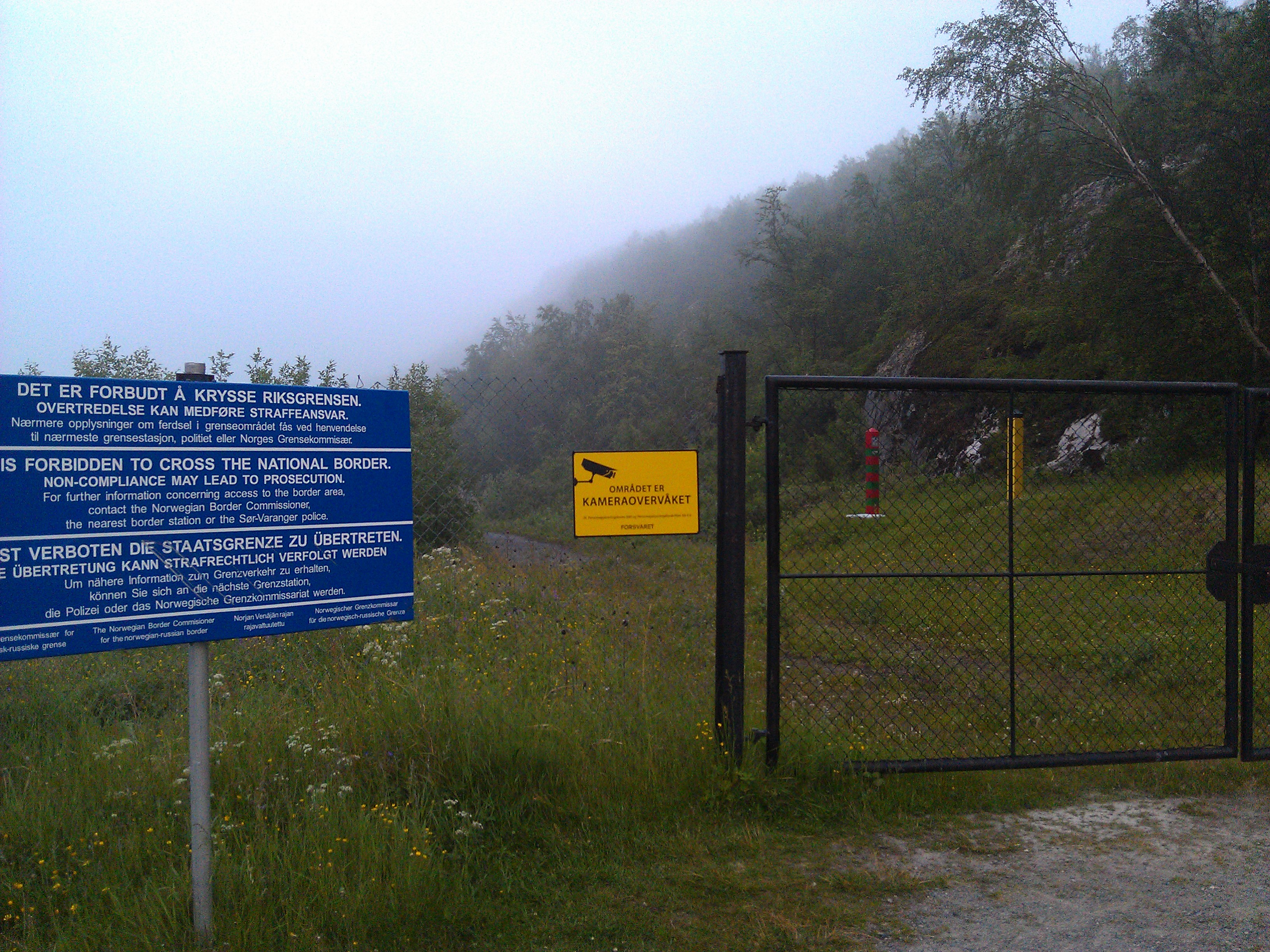
21st century border

During the Cold War the Soviet–Norway border was closed for long periods. There was some traffic via Skafferhullet during the construction of the Boris Gleb hydroelectric station from 1958 to 1963. When the construction period was over, the guardhouses were removed, and a solid fence set up.

In the summer of 1965, the border was open for Scandinavian tourists, who were allowed to visit a heavily guarded area around Borisoglebsky. Several thousand Norwegians crossed into during that summer season to visit, but no Soviets crossed into Norway. Due to some issues (like alcohol smuggling) that summer, Norwegian authorities refused to participate again, so the border was kept closed in 1966 and the following years.
