= Norwegian Border Commissioner =

Norwegian government agency

Norwegian Border Commissioner of the Norwegian-Russian border Grensekommissariatet for den norsk-russiske grense

Agency overview
- Formed: 1950
- Employees: 4

Jurisdictional structure
- Operations jurisdiction: Norwegian-russian border, Norway
- Specialist jurisdiction: National border patrol, security, integrity

Operational structure
- Overseen by: National Police Directorate
- Headquarters: Kirkenes
- Agency executive: Jens-Arne Høilund, Border Commissioner

Facilities
- Border control stations: Storskog

Website
- https://www.politi.no/grensekommissariatet/

The Norwegian Border Commissioner of the Norwegian-Russian border (Norwegian: Grensekommissariatet for den norsk-russiske grense) is a Norwegian government agency subordinate to the Ministry of Justice and Public Security that is headed by the National Police Directorate. The agency's main task is to ensure that the Border Agreement of 1949 between Norway and the then Soviet Union (now Russia), with subsequent regulations, laws and codes of conduct and traffic in the border area are complied with.

The Norwegian Border Commissioner was created in December 1950 and is headed by a civilian border commissioner. The position, however, has always been possessed by a military officer, discharged from the Norwegian Armed Forces. The post as the Border Commissioner Deputy has until now been occupied by the chief of the Garrison of Sør-Varanger.

The Border Commissioner is located in Kirkenes. The border station at Storskog is staffed by Norwegian police officers, in addition to the Border Commissioner's staff in Kirkenes.
