= Norway–Russia border =

International border

Coordinates: 69°39′52″N 30°07′00″E

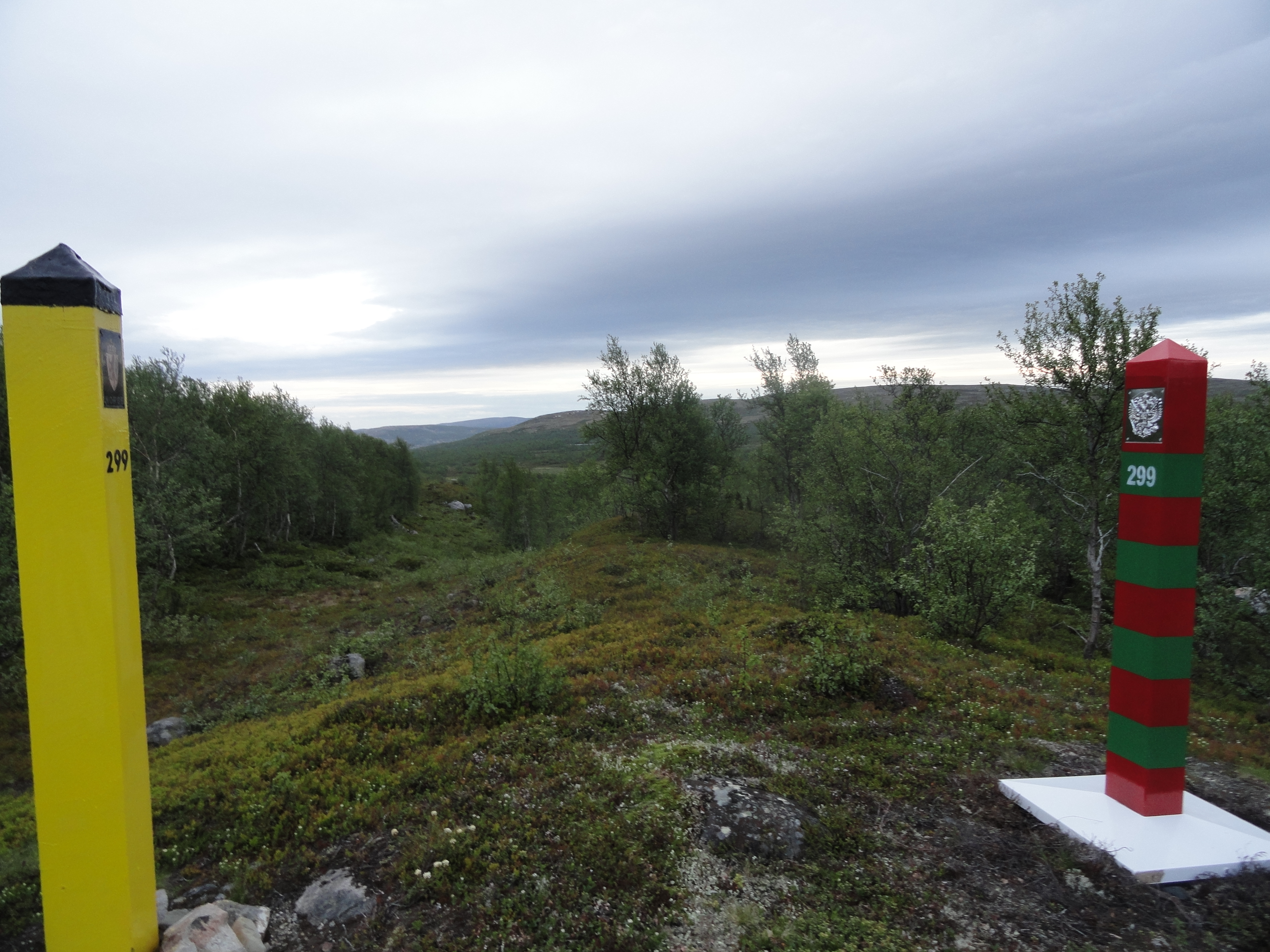
- Border mark number 299 at the Norwegian-Russian border

Characteristics
- Entities: Norway; Russia
- Length: 195.7 km (121.6 mi)

History
- Established: 1826 (official); Border treaty
- Current shape: 1826
- Treaties: Treaty of Novgorod (1326); Treaty of Saint Petersburg (1826); Treaty of Tartu (1920); Paris Peace Treaties (1947)

Norwegian and Russian boundary markers

The border

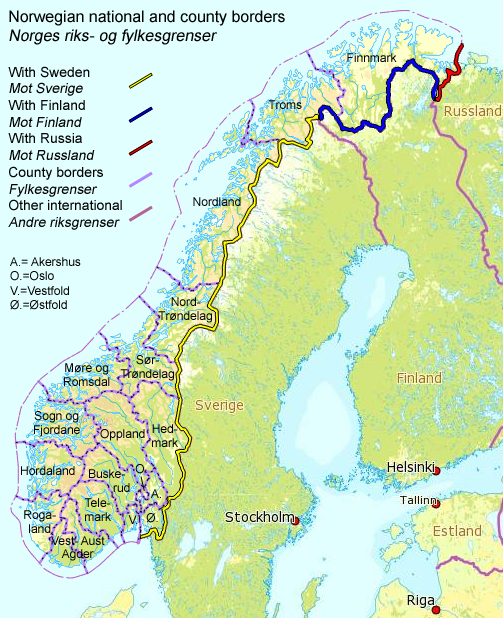
Norway–Sweden border Norway–Finland border Norway–Russia border

The border between Norway and Russia consists of a 195.7-kilometer (121.6 mi) land border between Sør-Varanger Municipality, Norway, and Pechengsky District, Russia, and a 23.2-kilometer (14.4 mi) marine border in the Varangerfjord. It further consists of a border between the two countries' exclusive economic zones (EEZ) in the Barents Sea and the Arctic Ocean. Between 1944 and 1991 the border was between Norway and the Soviet Union. There is a single border crossing, on E105, located at Storskog in Norway and Borisoglebsky in Russia. The Norwegian side is patrolled by the Garrison of Sør-Varanger and is under the jurisdiction of the Norwegian Border Commissioner, while the Russian side is patrolled by the Border Guard Service of Russia. Two-thirds of the border follows two rivers, the Pasvikelva and Jakobselva.

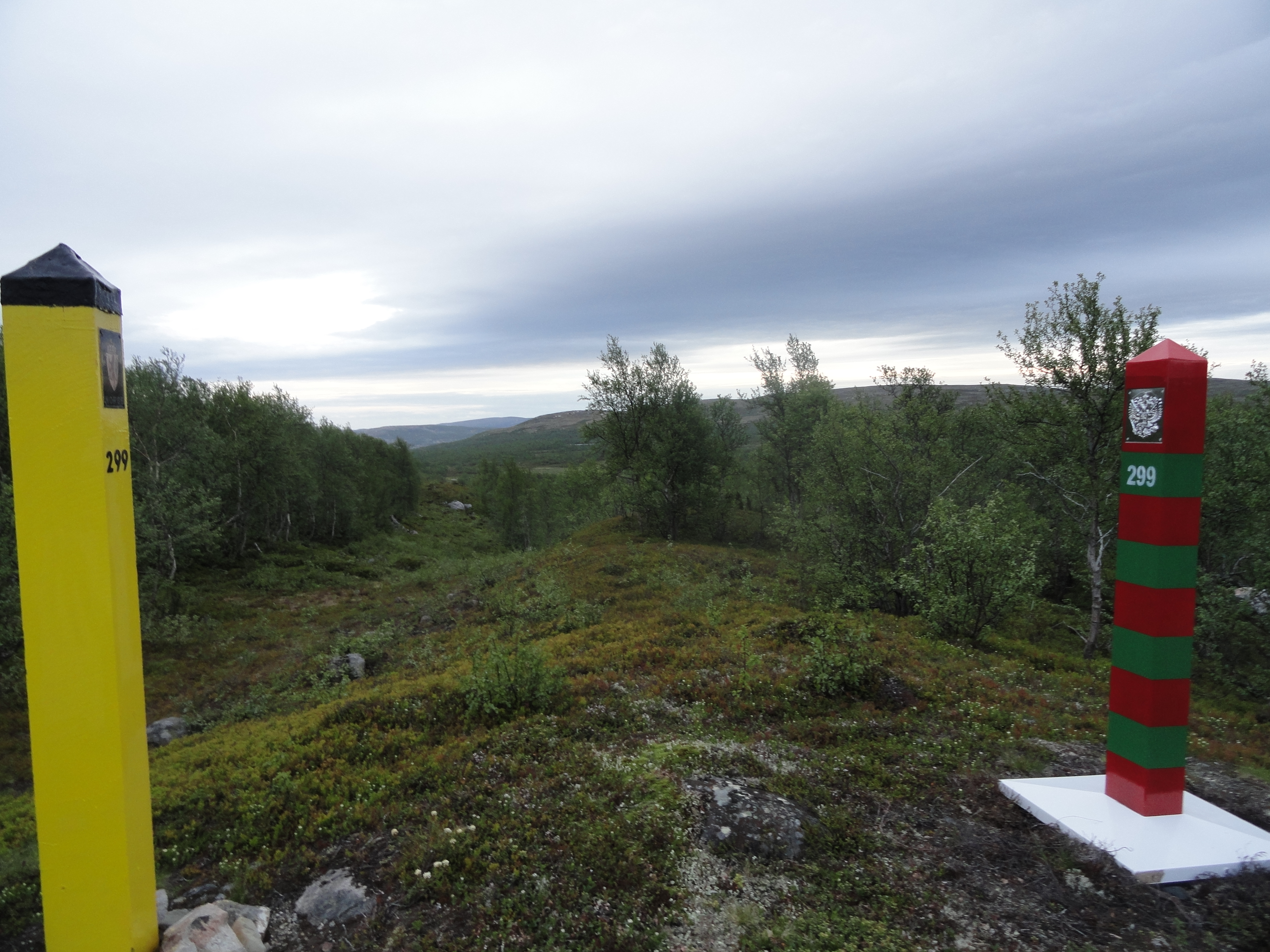
Boundary markers for Norway (yellow) and Russia (red and green) are located 4 m (13 ft) apart. The border runs halfway between the markers.

The border was defined as a march in a treaty in 1326 and separated which parts of the Sami could be taxed by Norway and Russia. The border line was defined by a treaty in 1826 and essentially remains the same border today. In 1920 Petsamo was ceded to Finland and the border became part of the Finland–Norway border. Petsamo was ceded to the Soviet Union in 1944 and the Norway–Soviet Union border was established. During the Cold War, the border was one of two between the North Atlantic Treaty Organization (NATO) and the Soviet Union, the other being the Soviet Union's border with Turkey. From 1991 to 1999 it was the only border between Russia and NATO. It is Norway's youngest unchanged border. Since the 1960s there has been disagreement as to the border between the two countries' EEZs, but this was resolved by a delimitation agreement in 2010.

== History ==
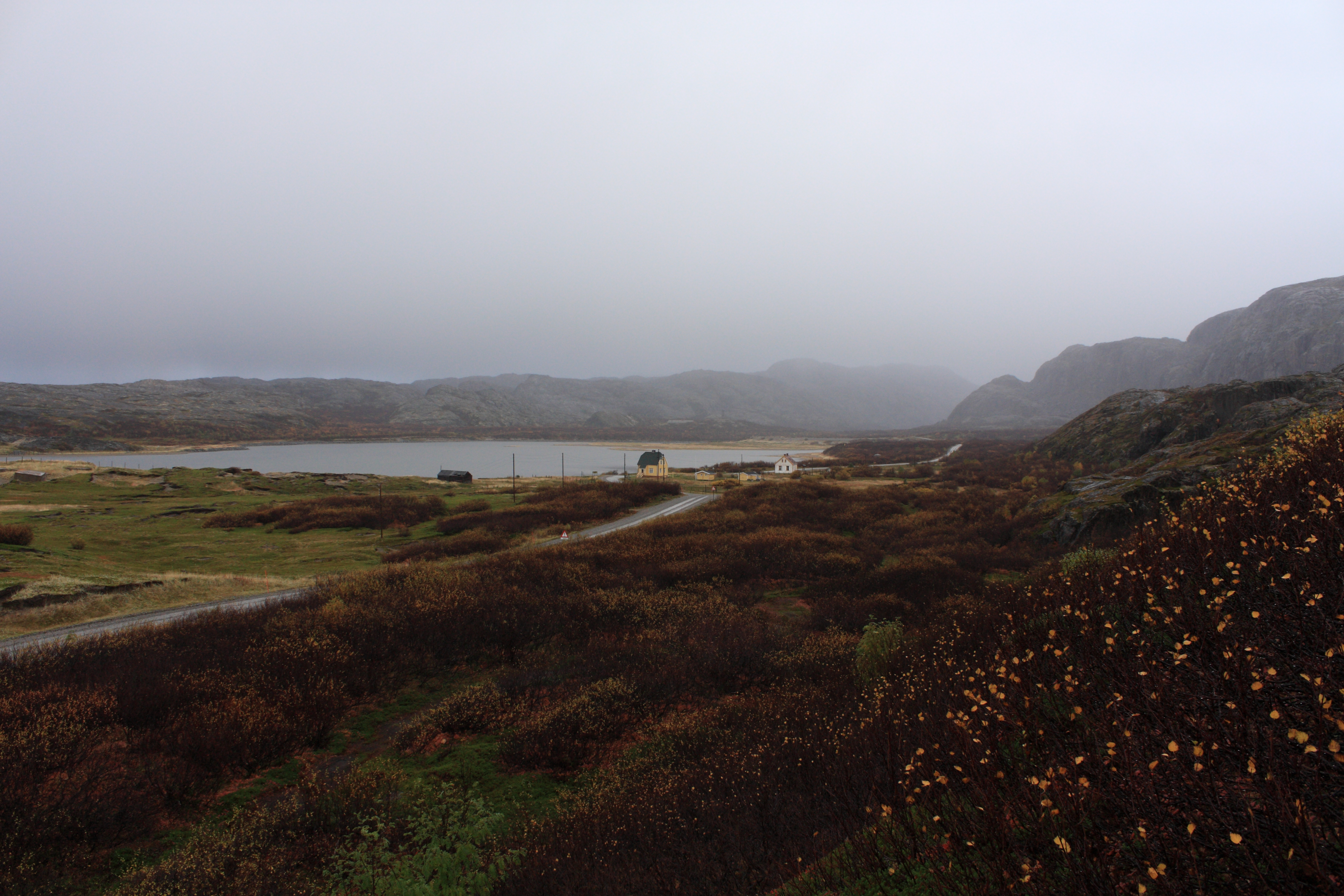
Grense Jakobselv is located immediately on the Norwegian side of the border

=== Open border ===
From the 11th century Olaf III of Norway regarded the borders of Norway as reaching to the White Sea. The first Norwegians started moving to Finnmark in the 13th century. Vardøhus Fortress was erected by Norway in 1300 further east than today's land border, supporting Norwegian land ownership on the Varanger Peninsula. There were no permanent Norwegian settlements on the Kola Peninsula. In 1326 Norway and the Novgorod Republic signed an agreement regarding taxation of the Kola Peninsula and Finnmark. No border line was drawn, creating a marchland where both countries held the right to taxation of the Sami. Religiously motivated Russian colonization of the jointly taxed areas started in the 16th century, and Russian-Orthodox chapels were built at Neiden, Pechenga and Boris Gleb. This accelerated the need for a specific border line. In 1582 Russian Tsar Ivan the Terrible declared the Kola Bay part of Russia, later specifying that Russia claimed all of Lapland. He further proposed that a new border line be drawn up. Denmark–Norway's King Frederick II responded by renewing the Norwegian claim to all land to the White Sea. His successor Christian IV traveled along the Finnmark coast in 1599 to increase the weight of the claims. As part of the Treaty of Knäred in 1613, Sweden abandoned all claims in Finnmark.

Territory (pink) ceded by Russia to Norway in 1826

The Dano-Norwegian government took the initiative to establish a border line in 1789. Russian authorities agreed, but because of the Russo-Turkish War no work was undertaken. New Dano-Norwegian requests were raised in 1793, 1797, and 1809, without action from their Russian counterpart. Norway joined a union with Sweden in 1814 and two years later King Carl John again tried to start negotiations, without success. In 1825, however, a common Norwegian and Russian commission was established to draw a border line, resulting in a report and a map which was approved by both countries' authorities. The treaty was signed in Saint Petersburg on 14 May 1826, and the following summer border poles were laid along the border. The thalweg principle was followed in the Jakobselva and Pasvikelva Rivers. Along the land borders the boundary markers were laid at a distance of 6 alen or 5 arshin (3.765 m or 12.35 ft). The border remains Norway's youngest unchanged border and Russia's oldest.

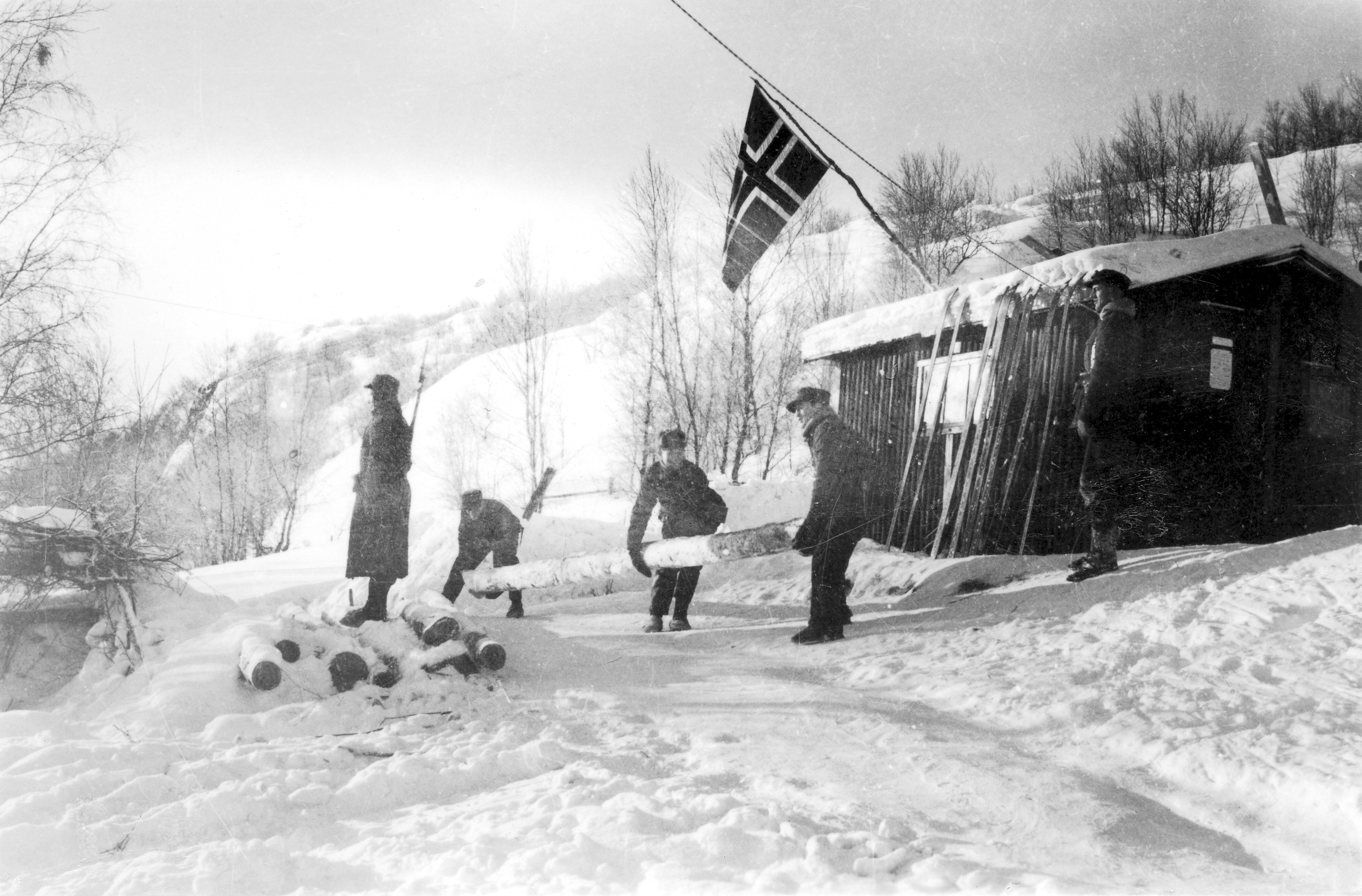
Norwegians guarding the Finland–Norway border at Skafferhullet in 1940 after the outbreak of the Winter War

The border was reviewed in 1846; a cairn was constructed at Muotkavaara, and the land border from the sea to Golmmešoaivi was cleared. The marker at the mouth of the Jakobselva was gone and had to be rebuilt, while several others had to be repaired. It was agreed that there would be a review every twenty-five years, which was formalized through a declaration the following year. Some markers were repaired in 1857, and new reviews were carried out in 1871 and 1896. In the latter year the width of the cleared area increased to 8 meters (26 ft). Maps were created for the entire border line in 1:42,000 scale, and in 1:8400 scale for the area immediately surrounding each marker. A partial review was carried out between Neiden and the Tana River in 1912. Up until the 1940s the border had been open, without border controls; farmers at Grense Jakobselv, for instance, did not need to worry about whether or not their cattle were on the correct side of the border.

During the late 19th century customs checkpoints were established at Elvenes and Grense Jakobselv. Norwegian authorities gave permission for customs-free transit of wares along Pasvikelva. There was a limited amount of trans-border trade, and import for personal use under certain volumes was customs-free. This was accelerated by significantly lower prices in Russia compared to Norway. From 1902 to 1917 the border crossing was used to smuggle revolutionary Russian literature into Russia. The material was printed at Finnmarken's printing press in Vadsø and smuggled over the border by boat. During World War I six soldiers were stationed at Nyborgmoen in Nesseby Municipality as "neutrality guards". This was gradually increased so that by 1918 there were 93 soldiers stationed in Sør-Varanger to guard the border.

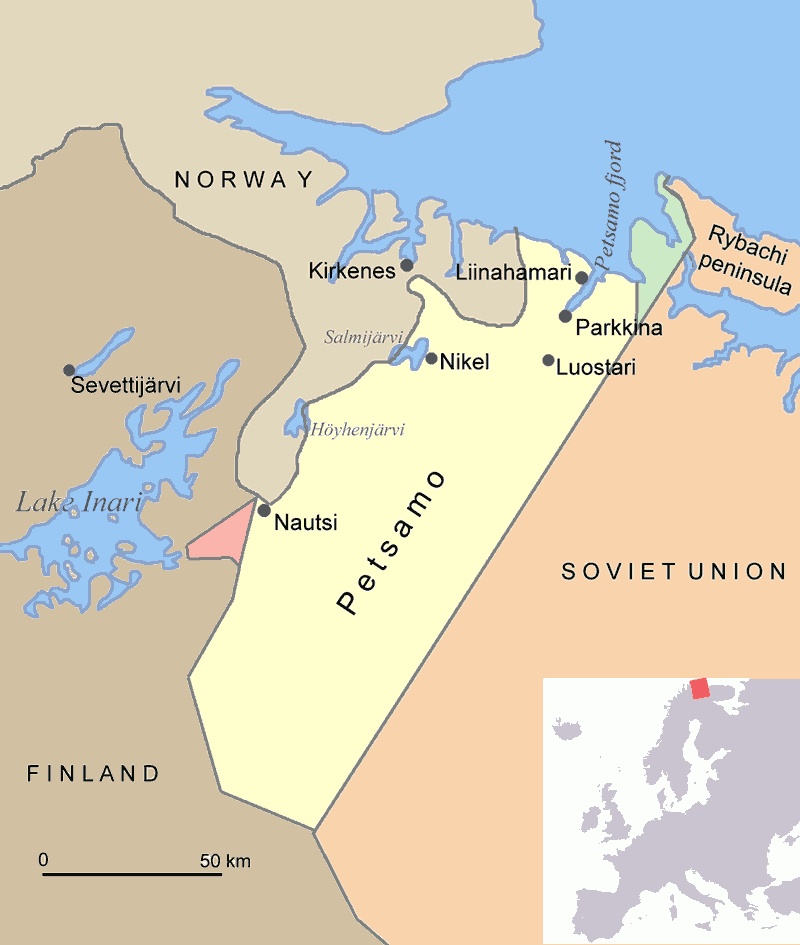
Petsamo was first ceded from Russia to Finland in 1920, and then reversed to the Soviet Union due to the Moscow Armistice of 1944 and the Paris Peace Treaties, 1947

Finland declared its independence from Russia following the October Revolution, which was followed up with the 1920 Treaty of Tartu, which ceded Petsamo to Finland, thus giving Finland access to the Barents Sea. This resulted in Norway and the Soviet Union no longer having a common border. The planned 1921 review was not carried out. A treaty regarding the border was signed between Finland and Norway on 28 April 1924, replacing the 1826 treaty, but not changing the border line. A review was carried out in 1925. The border line at the mouth of the Jakobselva was revised on 12 September 1931, and new markers were placed in June 1939. When Finland owned the Petsamo area there was a car ferry over the river between Svanvik–Salmijärvi which was the main border crossing.

=== Closing the border (1940s) ===
The Moscow Armistice of 1944 and the Paris Peace Treaties, 1947 ceded Petsamo and other Finnish areas to the USSR. During Operation Barbarossa, the Axis invasion of the Soviet Union in World War II, northern Norway served as the staging area for the German attack on Murmansk. The Soviet Union made an excursion over the border in 1944 in the Petsamo–Kirkenes Offensive which aimed to extinguish the German military forces in the area. Soviet forces took the town of Kirkenes, which had been evacuated by the Germans who used scorched earth tactics, on 24 October 1944. Soviet troops continued west to Tana Municipality, but withdrew in September 1945.

The ceding of Petsamo from Finland to the Soviet Union had no effect on the border, as the Soviet Union by default inherited the old border line. A common commission was created to the review the border, with negotiations taking place from 1 to 16 August 1946. The field review took place between 1 July and 4 September 1947. Norway initially proposed using cairns to mark the border, but the Soviet Union wanted to use the same method as along its other borders, with wooden markers, each 2 meters (6 ft 7 in) from the border line. There was to be a free line of sight from each pair of markers to the next. The idea initially met resistance from Norwegian authorities for cost reasons, but they soon agreed on the principle to reduce unintentional border crossings. Markers in soil were dug down 2 meters (6 ft 7 in) and markers on bedrock were fastened with four bolts. Border checkpoints were established at Skafferhullet and Boris Gleb. Geodesic measurements were undertaken to establish the border in accordance with the Bessel ellipsoid. The entire border area was mapped in 1:20,000.

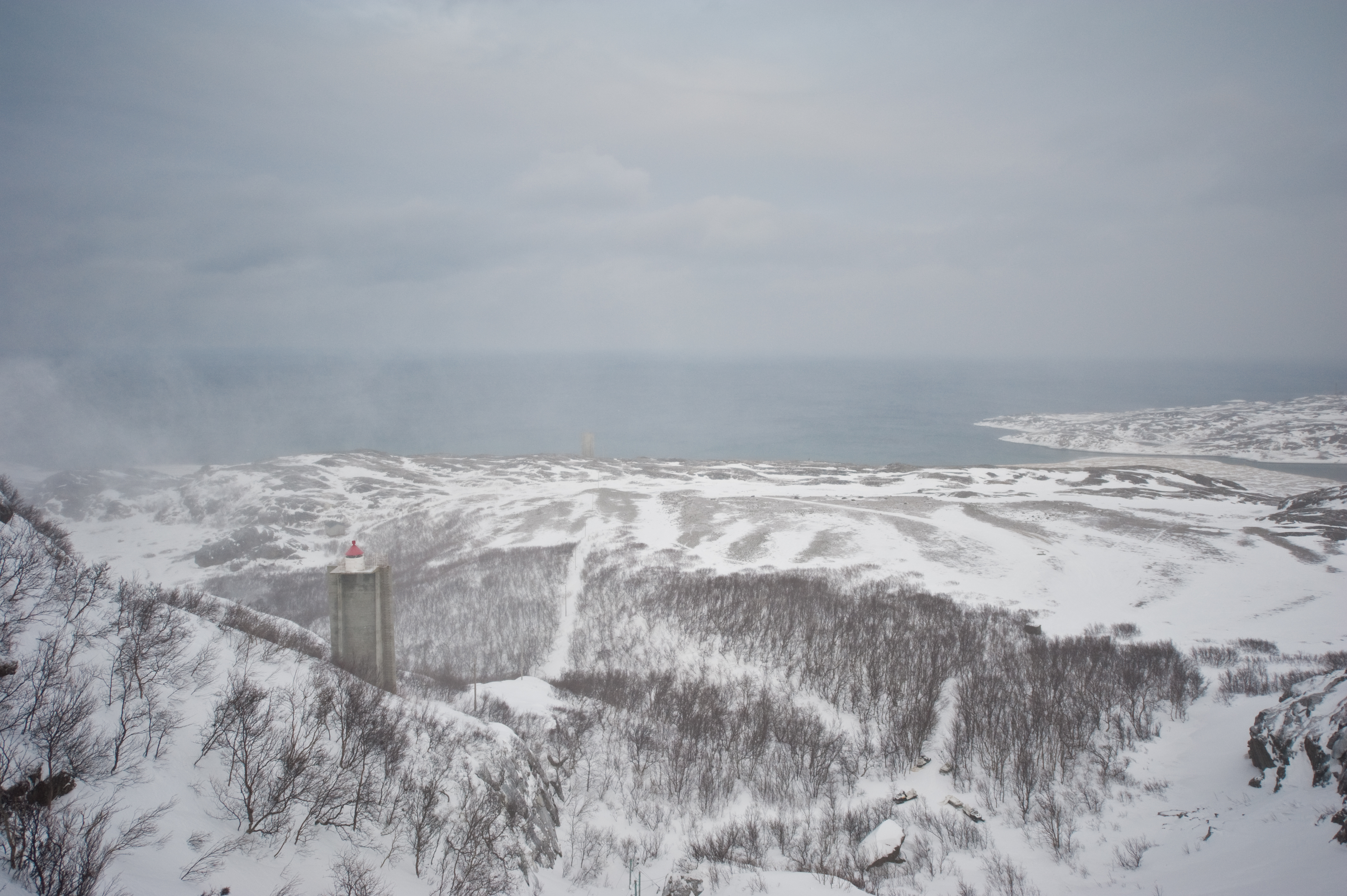
Norwegian border outpost in March

The Soviet authorities made proposals to change the border. The first was an equal exchange of land at Skoltefoss, but this was rejected by the Norwegian authorities as the area they were meant to cede was valuable for hydroelectricity. At Grensefoss Norway owned land on both sides of the border, but there was no interest by the Norwegian authorities to change the border as they wanted it to remain the same as from 1826. The border along Klistervatn and Fossevatn was set based on the maps from 1896. At the mouth of Jakobselva the maps from 1896 were of poor quality in combination with the thalweg having shifted since 1896. The thalweg line would create problems for the settlement at Grense Jakobselv, as they no longer would be able to use their harbor or have free access to the sea. The countries therefore agreed on a new line based on a Norwegian proposal, in exchange for the Soviet Union receiving three islets, including Kistholmen and Brennholmen, in the Pasvik River. The marine border within the territorial waters was established by a protocol signed on 15 February 1957. It was marked with two lead markers and originally stretched 4 nautical miles (7.4 km; 4.6 mi).

=== Cold War ===
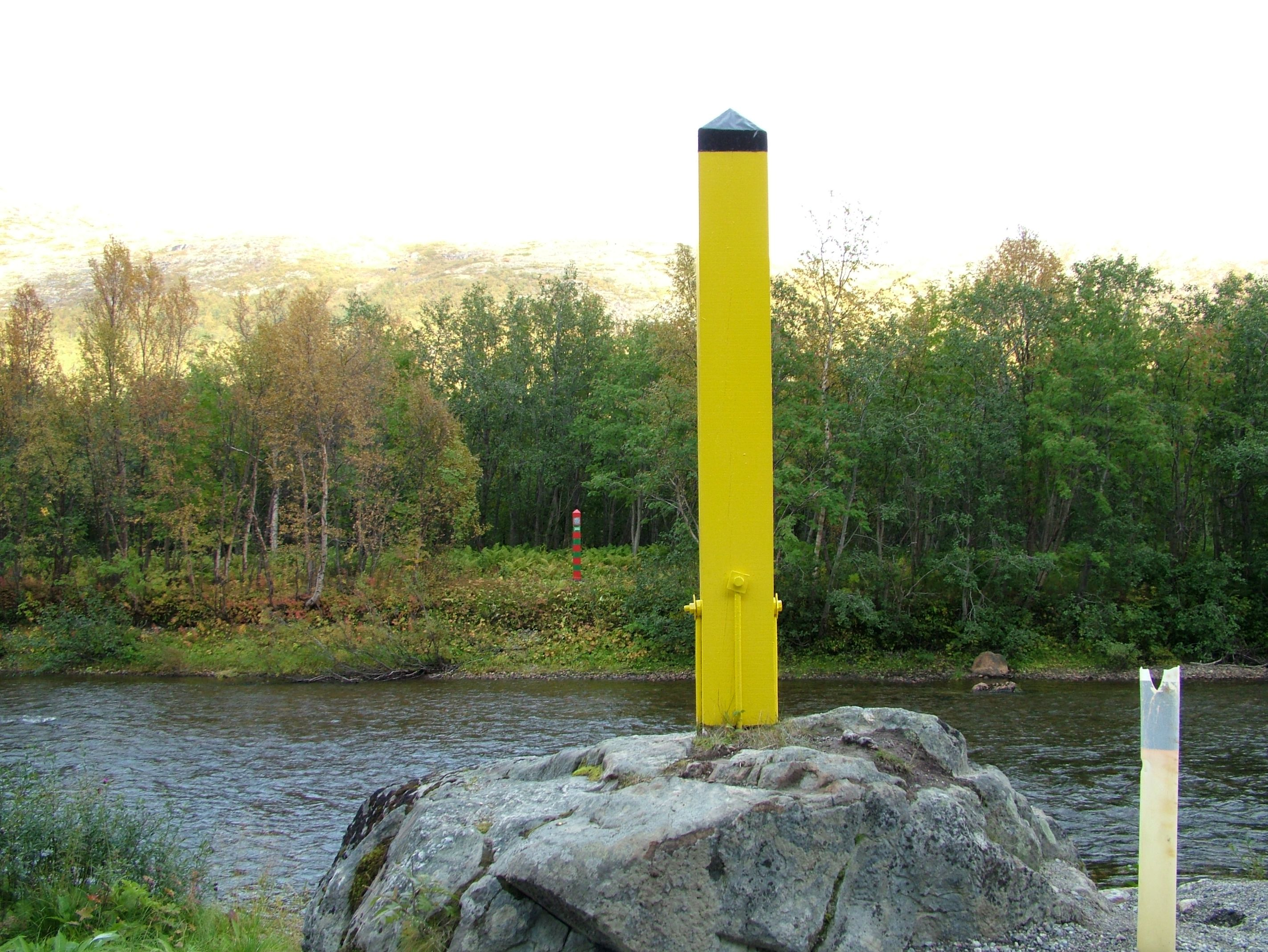
Jakobselva

During the Soviet era the border was guarded by Soviet border troops. The border was one of the two land borders between NATO and the Soviet Union, the other being the Soviet Union–Turkey border. This ensured that Russia–Norway border relations were a relevant matter for other NATO allies. During the Cold War, the Soviet Union was considered Norway's main enemy and Norway maintained a large military presence on the border. Norwegian government plans for the defense of Finnmark against the Soviet Union during the Cold War were based on using scorched earth tactics in the event of the Soviets crossing the border. The whole county of Finnmark was regarded by NATO as a buffer zone. Norwegian military leaders regarded the population in the county as potentially unreliable, and did not trust that they would be willing to defend their country against intruders, on account of the county's special ethnic and political composition, specifically Sami people and a higher number of communist sympathizers than elsewhere.

On the Norwegian side the border was from 1948 to 1950 patrolled by the National Mobile Police Service. From 1950 the responsibility was transferred to Sør-Varanger Police District, who received 25 officers from around the country. From 15 July 1955 the responsibility was taken over by the Norwegian Border Commission, who had nine outpost sergeants and 42 officers. This was terminated on 29 December 1958, when the responsibility was transferred to the Norwegian Army, who created the Garrison of Sør-Varanger.

Initially all meetings between the Norwegian and Soviet commissioners and their staff was held at the Storskog–Boris Gleb crossing. The Soviets quickly bought a small cabin to host meetings. If the meeting was initiated by the Soviets, it was held in the premises, while it was held outdoors if initiated by the Norwegians, unless circumstances dictated that it had to be held indoors. This caused the Norwegian authorities to build a conference room on their side of the border, which opened in 1956. Initially meetings between the two commissioners would be called by hoisting a flag or red lamp at the border, and the other country's soldiers would alert the commissioner, who would meet within two hours. Later a telephone connection was installed and the parties agreed on two hours each week day that they were to be available along with an interpreter. Initially the Soviet commissioner was based in Salmijärvi, but later moved to Nikel.

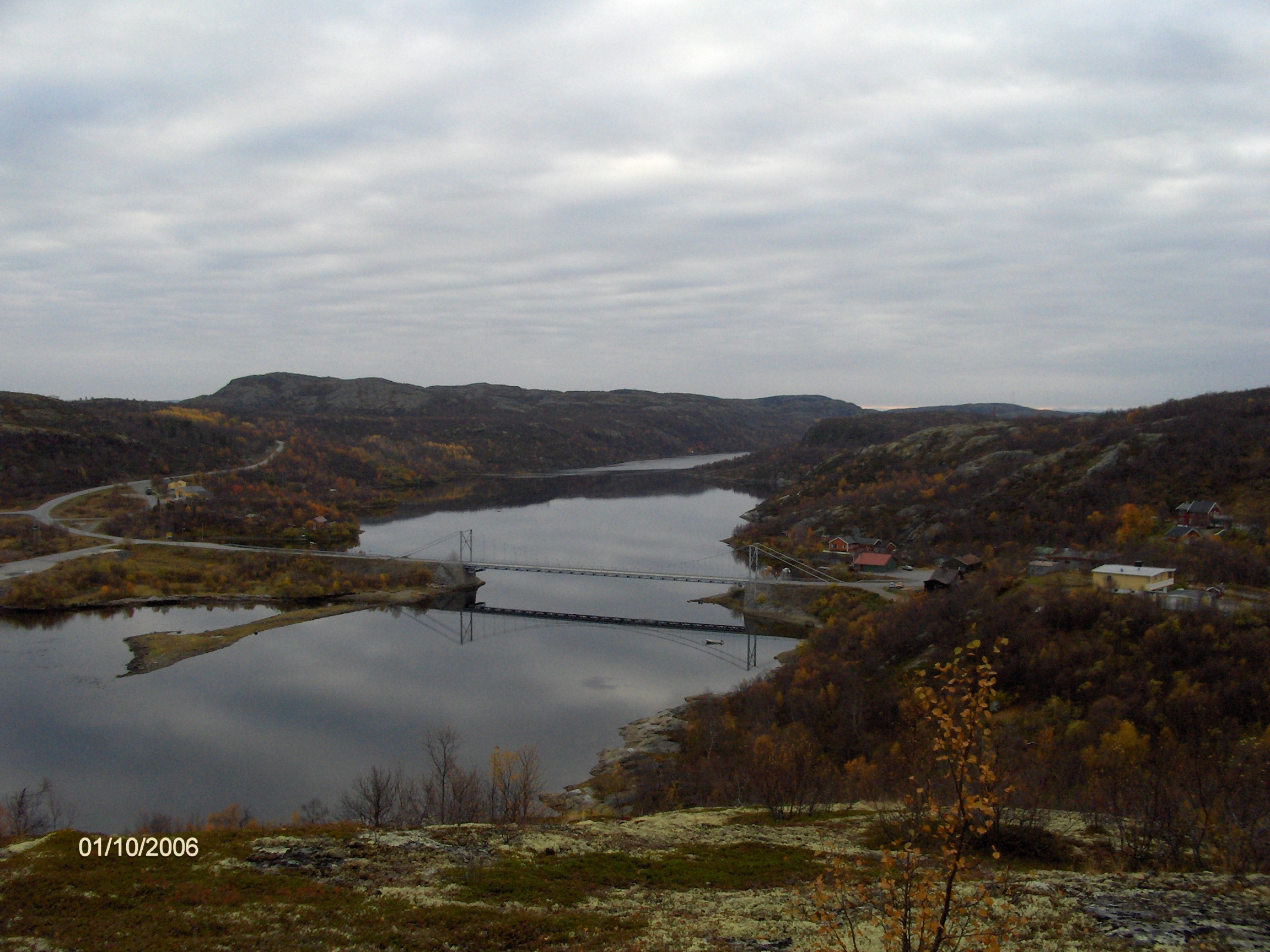
Looking upstream from Elvenes; the bridge and community is in Norway while the river further up is in Russia

The area on both sides of the river saw an increased industrialization, especially Sydvaranger in Norway and Pechenganikel (now, part of MMC Norilsk Nickel) in Russia. This raised the question of utilizing Pasvikelven for hydroelectricity. An agreement was signed in 1957 which would result in the construction of four power stations, the Paatsjoki River Hydroelectric Plants, of which two were owned by each of the countries. All four were built by Norwegian contractors and as the sites were all built on both sides of the border, they required increased flexibility of border crossing procedures. This was further complicated by the workers not having a sense of the border being closed and frequent, innocent transgressions of the border protocols. The power plants opened between 1963 and 1978. Up until the power plants opened the river had been used for log driving from Finland to the sawmill at Elvenes, which was permitted according to the border treaty.

There have been a limited number of illegal crossings of the border. For instance an American in 1947 and a West German in 1964 both received a few weeks in detention and smaller fines. During the summer of 1965 a trial was made whereby Norwegians could visit Boris Gleb without a visa. This was organized by the creation of a separate border checkpoint at Skafferhullet. Although this was intended only for the local population, the 27-year-old American tourist Newcomb Mott chose to cross the border illegally and when he arrived at the border control, he was apprehended. He was tried and sentenced to one and a half years in a labor camp, but was later found dead on a train. This, combined with "vodka traffic" the visa-free crossing created and concerns of recruitment of Soviet spies, made Norwegian authorities terminate the Skafferhullet crossing and the visa-free project later that year.

A Soviet border provocation on 7 June 1968, together with the invasion of Czechoslovakia that year and a general increase in Soviet military activity on the Norwegian border, contributed to a large increase in the funding for the Norwegian military presence on the border. Yet the Russia–Norway border is the only one of Russia's borders where an open war between the two bordering countries has not taken place. (there was a war between the Soviet Union and German controlled Norway which much affected this area)

Proposals for conservation of the Norwegian part of Pasvikdalen was first launched by Carl Schøyen in 1936. An area of 51 square kilometers (20 sq mi) was preserved in 1951 and Øvre Pasvik National Park was created in 1970, with a slightly smaller area. The park was expanded to 119 square kilometers (46 sq mi) in 2003. On 7 December 1971 the two countries signed a protocol regarding protection of the fisheries in Jakobselven and Pasvikelven. In the late 1970s Norway, inspired by Finland, considered replacing the wooden poles with fibreglass as this would make them more durable and reduce maintenance. Two poles were replaced in 1979 and remained at the turn of the millennium. However, the authorities concluded that wooden poles were more suitable and more durable in relation to human contact, as Norway, unlike Russia and Finland, allows people to travel up to the border. In 1989 there were 2,000 border crossings.

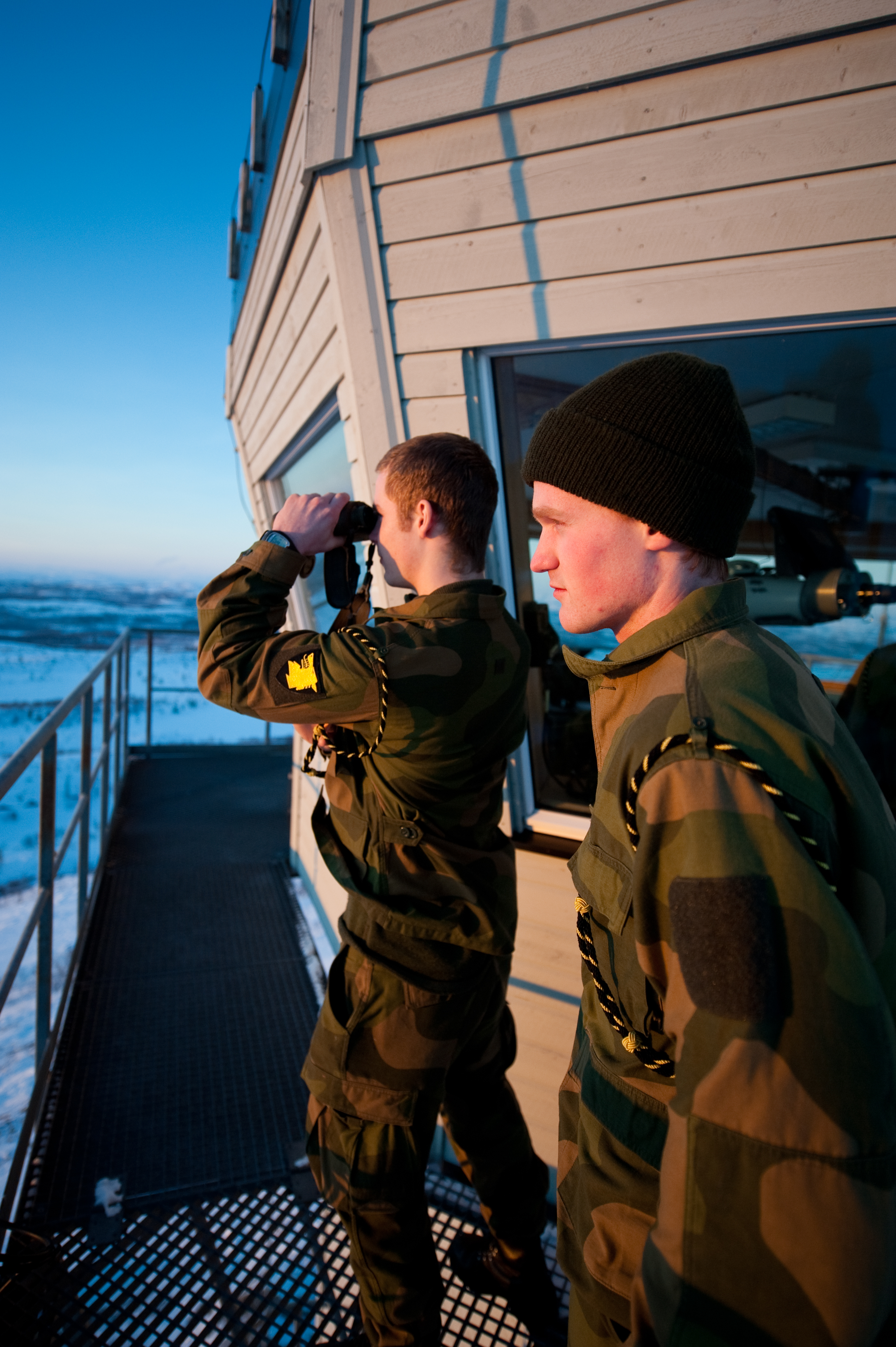
Conscripts from Norway's Garrison of Sør-Varanger patrol the border from a border outpost

=== Increased traffic ===
The dissolution of the Soviet Union in 1991 caused the Norway–Soviet Union border to become the Norway–Russia border. This resulted in a more liberal border crossing policy, which saw the number of crossings increase to 80,000 by 1992. For Norwegian authorities this meant that police and customs authorities would have to be regularly stationed at the border. A large amount of the initial traffic was from Russians who sold crafts and souvenirs at markets and fairs throughout Finnmark. From 1992 Norwegian authorities introduced limitations on the activity, resulting in a reduction in trans-border traffic. However, by 1998 the traffic had nearly hit 100,000.

From 1991 to 1999 (Poland joining NATO), Norway was the only NATO country to share a land border with Russia. This caused a decrease in allied interest in Norway's border issue, leaving Norway more to itself in managing the relationship. Cooperation concerning conservation of nature started in 1990. It was initially a Norwegian proposal to protect the important bird area and lake of Fjærvann, and resulted in a joint Norwegian and Russian Pasvik Nature Reserve. The Russian part was formally established in 1992 and the Norwegian part the following year.

In 2003 a new border station was opened at Borisoglebsk, financed by the Norwegian Ministry of Foreign Affairs. Norway and Russia signed a protocol on 11 July 2007 which established the border through the Varangerfjord out 73 kilometres (45 mi) from land. In 2011 the two countries agreed to replace the wooden markers with poles made of composite materials. This was to reduce the need for maintenance, as the new markers are expected to have a life span up to fifty years, compared to five to ten years for wooden poles. This took place at the same time as a review of the border and creation of new maps along a 2 to 3 kilometres (1.2 to 1.9 mi) wide corridor on both sides of the border line. New maps were completed in 2012.

Work started in 2011 on the Russian side and 2014 on the Norwegian side of the border to upgrade the E105 highway. It was completed in 2017 with a new tunnel and bridge on the Norway side of the border. The driving time between Kirkenes and Murmansk, the regional capital on the Russian side, is now about three hours unless there are delays at the border. The border station at Storskog was upgraded for increased capacity with completion in April 2012. Residents of Sør-Varanger and parts of Pechengsky District can from 29 May 2012 visit the other country without a visa (but they need a permit, a kind of multi-travel visa), on the condition that they do not travel outside a zone 30 to 50 kilometres (19 to 31 mi) from the border. On 29 April 2022, due to the Russian invasion of Ukraine, Norway closed its border to Russian freight. However, Russian fishing vessels are exempt from the sanctions.

=== Delimitation agreement ===
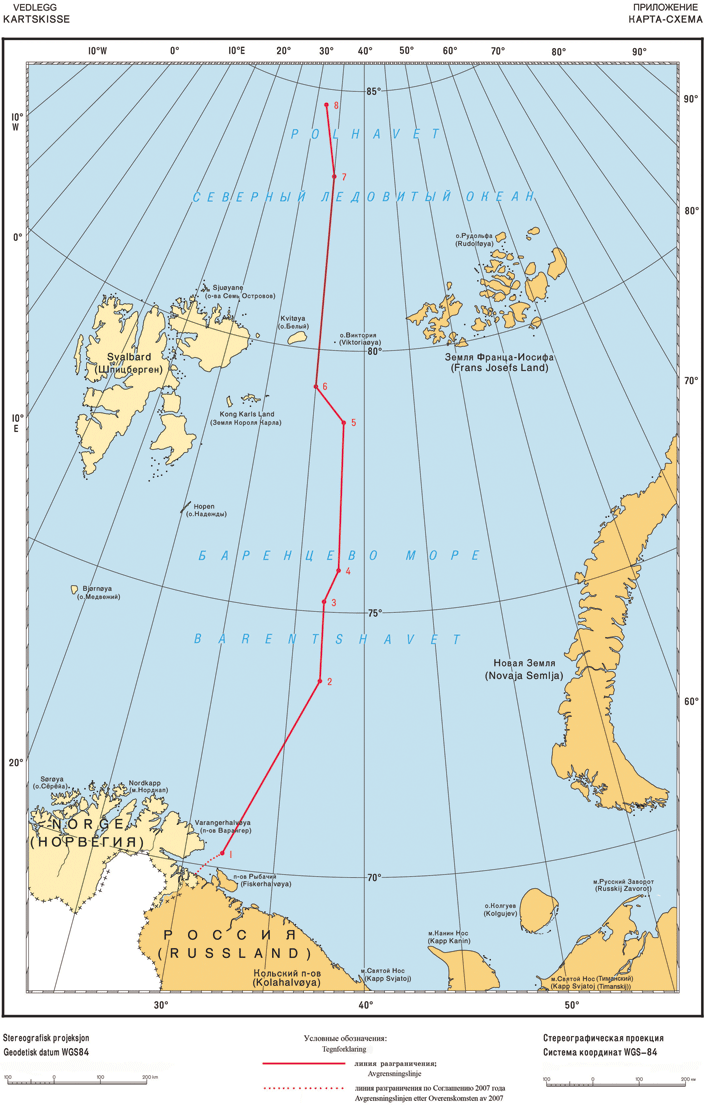
The delimitation border

Negotiations on the outside marine border were initiated in 1970. Norway claimed, in accordance with the United Nations Convention on the Law of the Sea Article 15 and the Convention on the High Seas, that the border should follow the equidistance principle, the border being defined by midpoints between the nearest land area or islands, as is normal practice internationally. The Soviet Union claimed, based on a decision by Joseph Stalin from 1926, which was not recognized by any other country than the Soviet Union, that a "sector principle" should apply, such that the border should follow meridian lines. Most of the disputed area was within what would normally be considered Norwegian according to the relevant international treaties. In 1975 the two countries agreed upon a moratorium prohibiting exploration for oil and gas in the disputed area.

In 1978 a provisional Grey Zone Agreement, regulating fishery in a 60,000 km^{2} (23,000 sq mi) zone, named The Grey Zone in some documents from the same period, was signed, which has since been renewed annually. From the Norwegian side, the agreement was negotiated by Labour Party politician Jens Evensen and his protégé Arne Treholt, who was later exposed as a Soviet spy and convicted of high treason. The agreement was highly controversial in Norway. Many Norwegians believed that Evensen and Treholt gave too many concessions to the Soviet Union, and that they were motivated by Soviet sympathies. The agreement caused consternation in parliament and government, and Evensen had difficulty receiving acceptance from his own government, where many held the opinion that he had exceeded his authority. The opposition criticized him for having accepted less than Norway's rightful claim. Treholt, who was then serving a twenty-year sentence, admitted in 1990 that he had acted as an informer for the Soviet negotiators. The arrest and conviction of Treholt in 1984 and 1985 had a devastating effect on Evensen, who withdrew completely from public life in Norway. In 1989, Evensen compared Treholt to Vidkun Quisling.

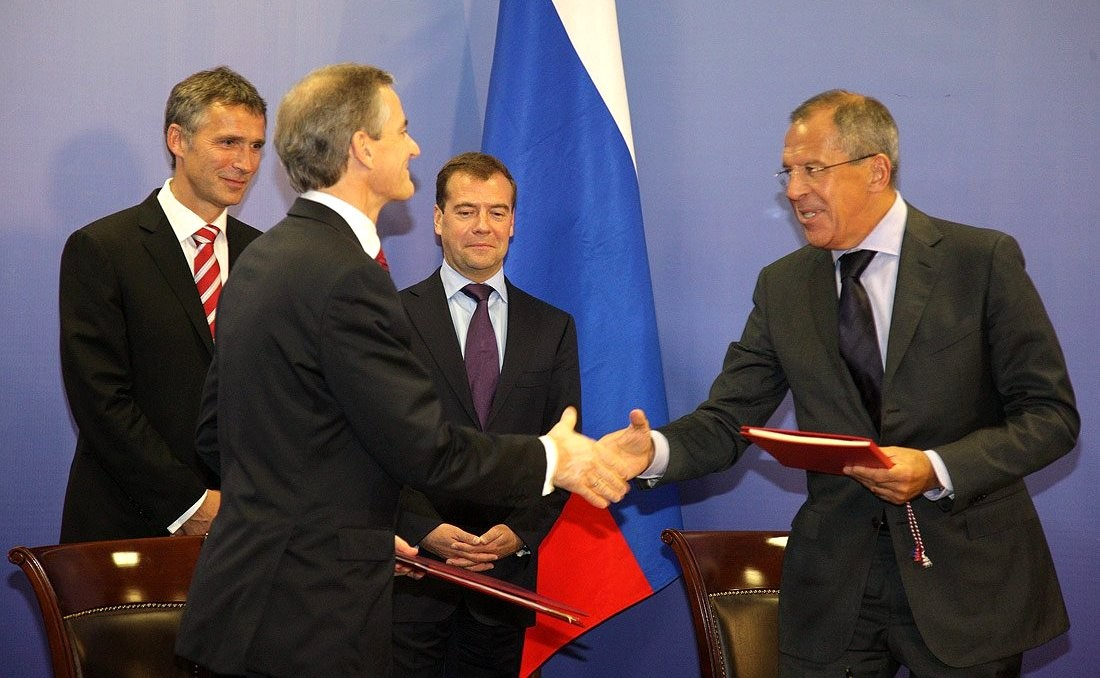
Signing of the Russian-Norwegian Treaty on Maritime Delimitation and Cooperation in the Barents Sea and the Arctic Ocean in Murmansk on 15 September 2010

During a meeting in Oslo on 27 April 2010, President of Russia Dmitry Medvedev and Prime Minister of Norway Jens Stoltenberg announced that the territorial dispute in the Barents Sea was settled. The agreement is a compromise which divides a disputed area of around 175,000 square kilometers (68,000 sq mi) into two approximately equally sized parts. The agreement was signed on 15 September 2010 in Murmansk by Medvedev and Stoltenberg. The Parliament of Norway unanimously approved the treaty on 8 February 2011. The debate lasted only an hour, and all representatives of Norwegian political parties praised the agreement. On 30 March, Russia's State Duma also voted in support of ratification, despite strong opposition from Communist Party representatives. Medvedev signed a law ratifying the treaty on 8 April 2011. The law was titled Federal Law on Ratification of the Treaty between the Russian Federation and the Kingdom of Norway on Maritime Delimitation and Cooperation in the Barents Sea and the Arctic Ocean. After ratification by both countries, there was a 30-day waiting period before it came into force. The treaty entered force on 7 July 2011, ending the 44-year-old border dispute.

The treaty stipulates conditions for fishing cooperation, providing for the retention of the mechanism to jointly regulate fishing in the Barents Sea. The treaty also defines the principles of cooperation in hydrocarbons deposits exploration. A deposit which is crossed by the maritime border may only be exploited as a whole subject to a bilateral agreement. The border treaty is economically significant, as it makes possible to conduct geological surveys and hydrocarbons drilling in the formerly disputed area, which is estimated to contain up to 6.8 billion tons of oil and gas. The area is located west of Shtokman, one of the world's largest natural gas fields. According to Anatoly Zolotukhin, vice president of World Petroleum Council, it is "a very prolific area—maybe even more prolific than Shtokman". The Norwegian company Petroleum Geo-Services has been contracted to begin surveying the Norwegian part of the area in 2011. Seismic acquisition in Norway's new maritime zone started on 8 July 2011, and was completed on September 15 2011.

In 2022, Vyacheslav Volodin, the leader of the Russian State Duma, stated that Russia should reconsider the agreement due to Norway hindering food supplies to Russian settlements in Svalbard.

=== European migrant crisis ===
In 2015 an Arctic route through the Storskog border crossing was established by migrants to the European Union/European Economic Area. The Arctic route involves fewer border crossings and avoids any dangerous sea crossings. Migrants began to cross the border riding bicycles, as pedestrians are not allowed in the Russian border area, and public transport operators and private car drivers are heavily penalised for transporting passengers who lack official documentation. Between August and October 2015 the number of migrants transiting through Storskog doubled every week.

The loophole was closed in January 2016, when juxtaposed controls were introduced, and a border barrier was erected. An estimated 5,500 to 10,800 migrants, mostly from Syria, crossed the border riding bicycles.

=== Russian-Ukrainian War ===
Following Russia's invasion of Ukraine in 2022, numerous military-age Russians escaped conscription by crossing the border, prompting Norway to increase its surveillance of the area. Kirkenes, despite its long-running ties with Russia, has been targeted by Russian hybrid warfare tactics. Norway has fortified its border with Russia, implementing cameras, sensors and drone surveillance flights, as of 2025, Norway plans to increase monitoring measure systems across the border. It also joined the European Union's strategy for the Baltic Sea region, as part of the EUSBSR.

== Geography ==
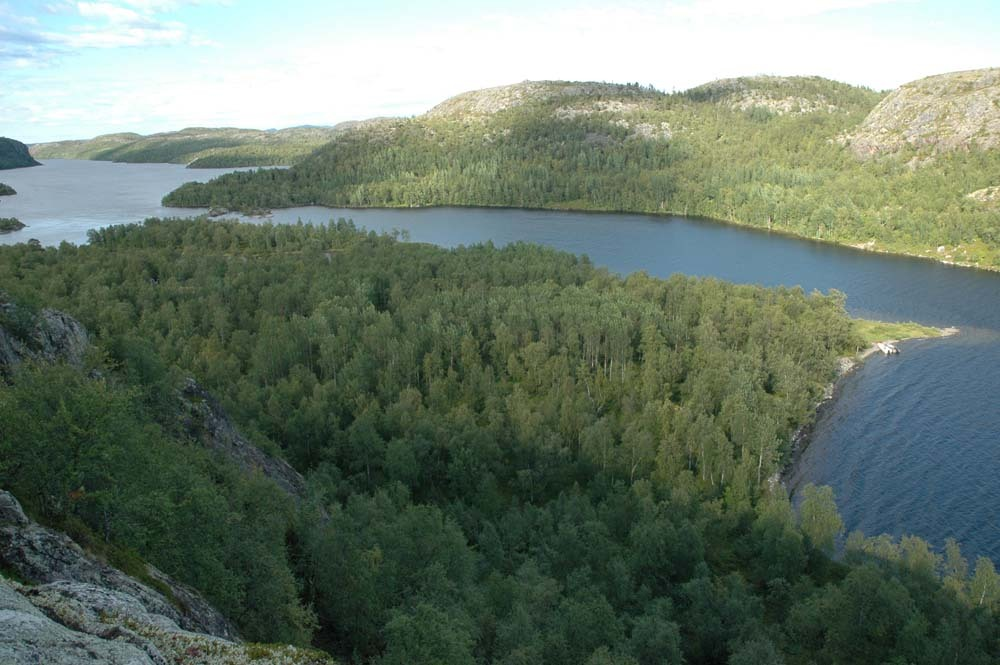
Harefossen

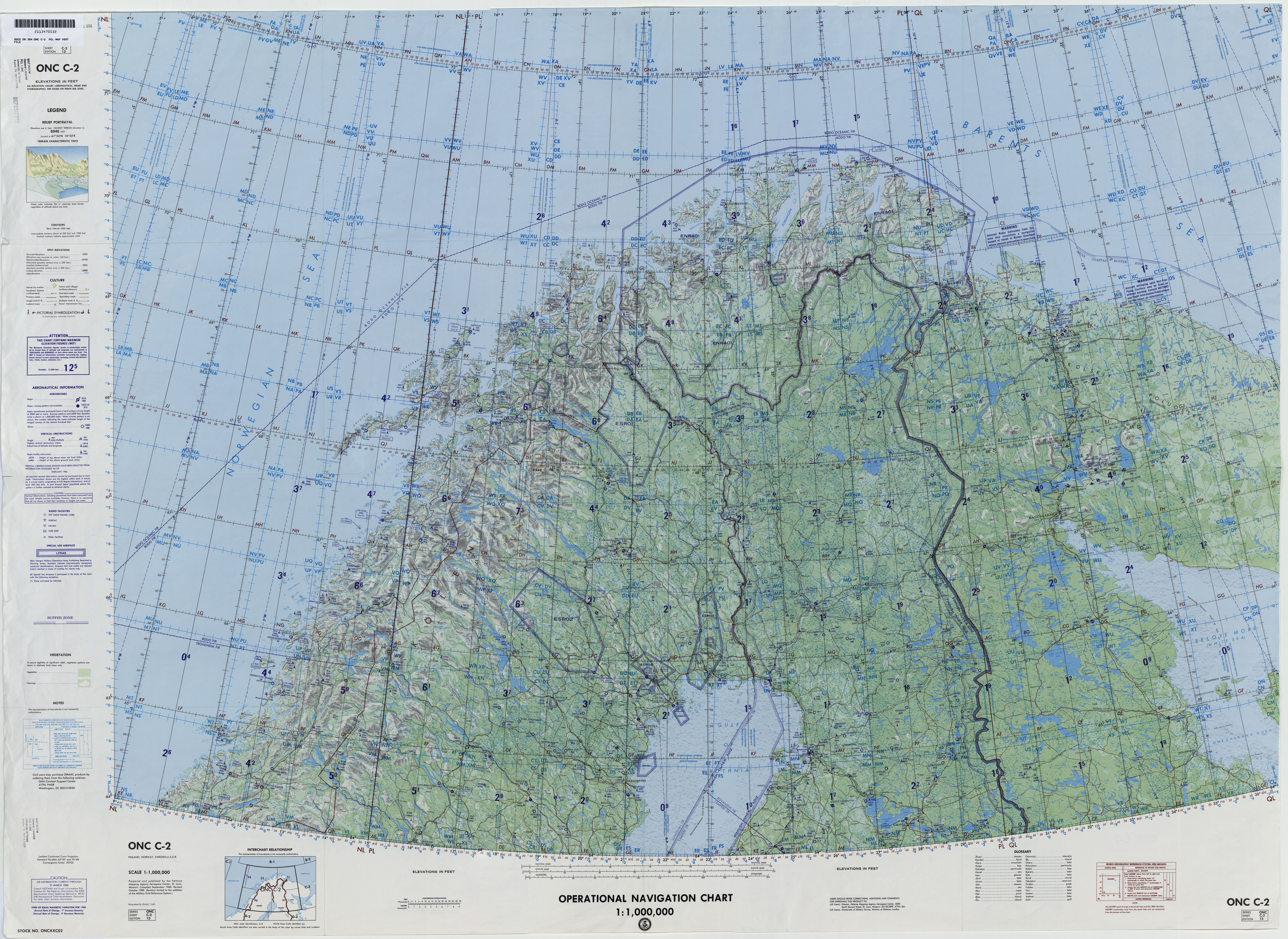
Map including the Norway–USSR border

The river of Pasvikelva is 128 kilometers (80 mi) long and runs through the valley of Pasvikdalen. The river drains Finland's Lake Inari and empties into Varangerfjord at Elvenes. After a very short section in Finland, the river runs 22 kilometers (14 mi) through Russia before reaching the Norway–Russia border, after which is acts as a border river for 106 kilometers (66 mi). Prior to being dammed the river consisted of nine lakes and fifteen waterfalls. It was originally possible to travel the entire length of the river by boat, but the current seven dams make it difficult as boats must be carried past the dams. The river falls 114 meters (374 ft) and the entire high difference is regulated and used for hydroelectricity. Finland receives compensation for the impact on Lake Inari, which is regulated for level difference of 1.75 meters (5 ft 9 in).

== Control ==
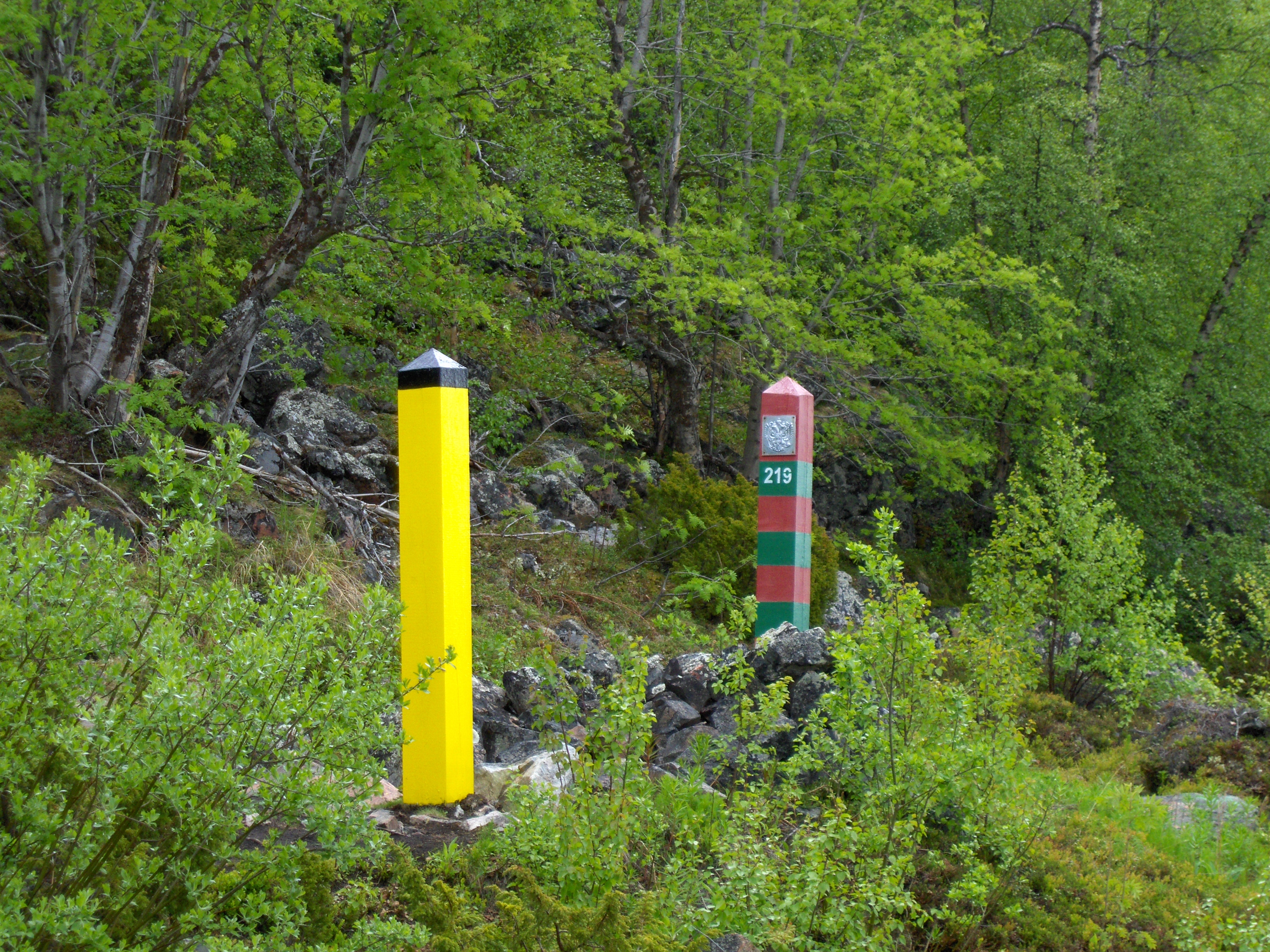
Boundary markers near Elvenes; the Norwegian markers are yellow with black tops and the Russian red and green, note coat of arms on Russian border marker

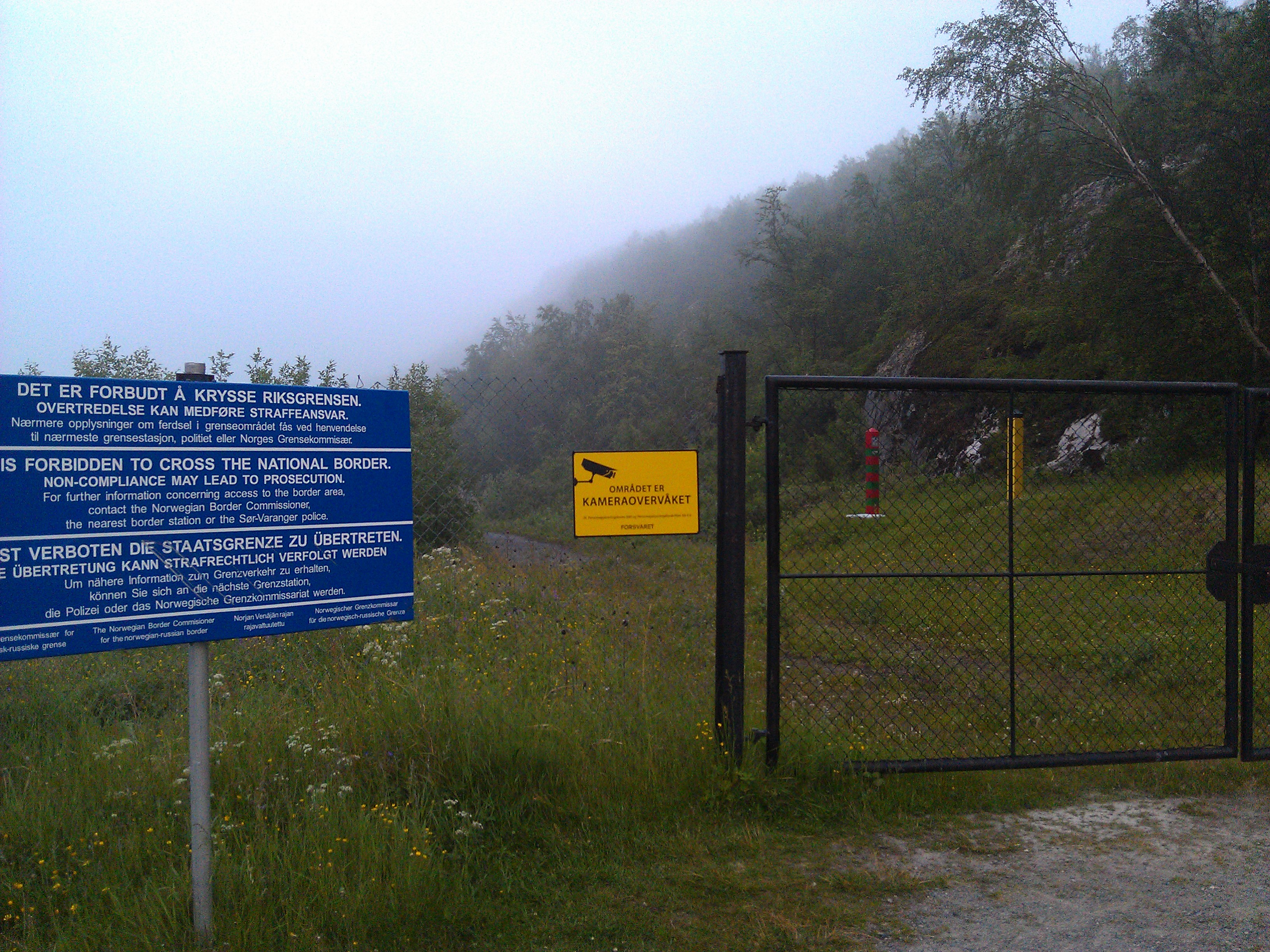
The Norway–Russia border, seen from Skafferhullet, Norway, with a Norwegian fence.

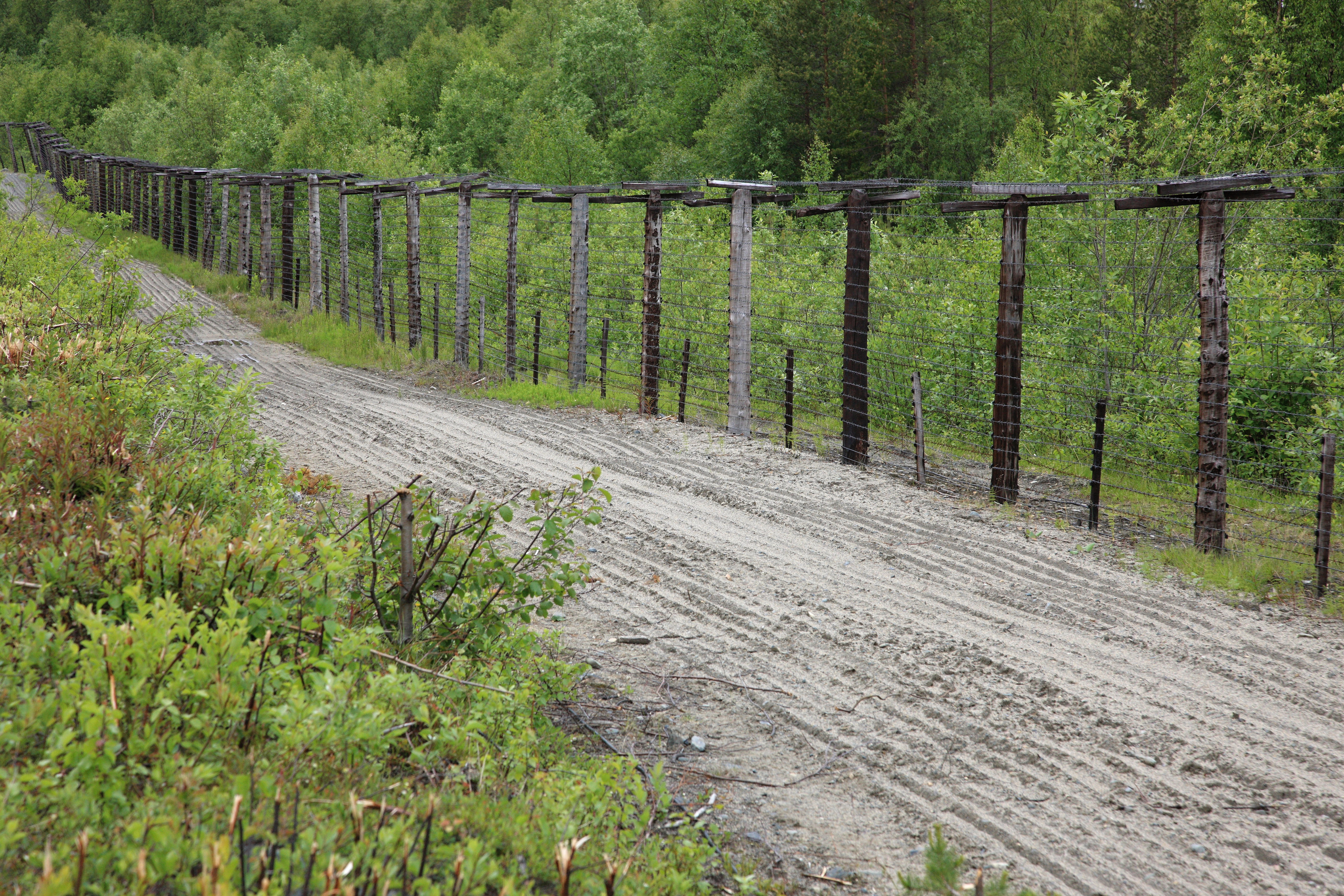
Russian fence near the border to Norway

Both countries have appointed a border commissioner to uphold the border treaty and its protocols. The Norwegian Border Commissioner is based in Kirkenes and is subordinate to the National Police Directorate. The Russian commissioner is based in Nikel. Norwegian border patrolling is undertaken by the Garrison of Sør-Varanger, which largely bases itself on use of conscripts. In Russia border patrolling is carried out by the Border Guard Service of Russia and the Federal Security Service. The EEZs are patrolled by the Norwegian Coast Guard and the Russian FSB Coast Guard, respectively.

The border is marked with 415 border markers, consisting of 387 pairs of poles, 25 cairns, two lead markers and one stake. The three-country cairn is unnumbered, while the remaining markers are numbered from 1 through 415 starting at the Finnish border. Each of the pairs of poles are both located 2 meters (6 ft 7 in) from the border, unless the border runs through water. The Norwegian markers are yellow with a 18 centimeters (7.1 in) tall black top—this was chosen because it would be most visible in all types of weather and lighting. The Russian markers have a pattern of alternating red and green, each 18 centimeters (7.1 in) tall. The red was chosen to symbolize the Flag of the Soviet Union, while the green symbolized the color of the border guards' uniforms. Both poles have the respective country's coat of arms on the side facing the border. While originally made of wood, the border markers are now made of composite materials.

Each country has the responsibility for maintenance of its boundary markers and keeping the clear-cut zone. Most of the maintenance is undertaken during the summer. In August each year there is a common inspection of the entire border. The practical responsibility alternates between the two countries each year. It is carried out by three groups, each which cover a third of the border. Each group consists of two Norwegians and two Russians and the inspection takes two to three days. Afterwards there is a common debriefing.

On the Norwegian side there are no physical hindrances on the border and it is permitted to move all the way to the border itself, except for Storskog, Skafferhullet, and some hydro power stations, where there are fences where roads reach the border. On the Russian side there is a fence located anywhere between 0 and 5 kilometers (0 and 3 mi) from the border. Although not electrified, it has sensors which will notify the border controllers if touched. The fence stretches the entire distance between the Barents Sea and the Gulf of Finland and was built during the Cold War to keep in the population of the Soviet Union. It remains the only barbed-wire fence along a Russian border in Europe. Within lies the Border Security Zone which civilians are not permitted access to. Photography from one country into the other is only permitted if the pictures do not include military personnel and installations and if not using tripods or lenses longer than 200 mm.

Norwegian border police issued an announcement in 2016 that it is forbidden to cross the border via land, water, and air, including at border markers (except with permission or at the border station), to have contact with people across the border or throw things over it. This is already written in the law.

== Crossing ==
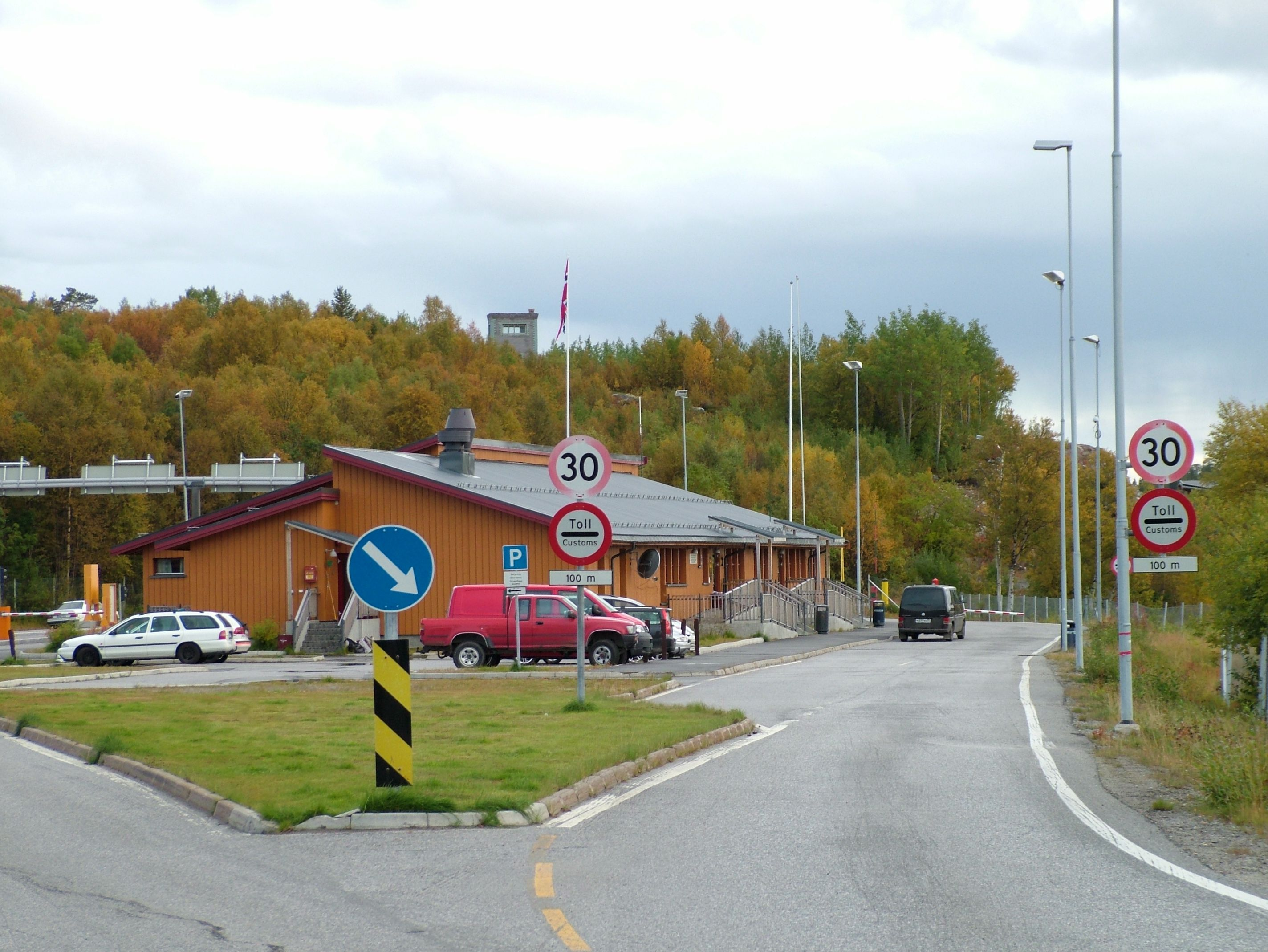
The Norwegian border crossing station at Storskog. The exact border is between the two pillars behind the black van. There is a Russian station further away.

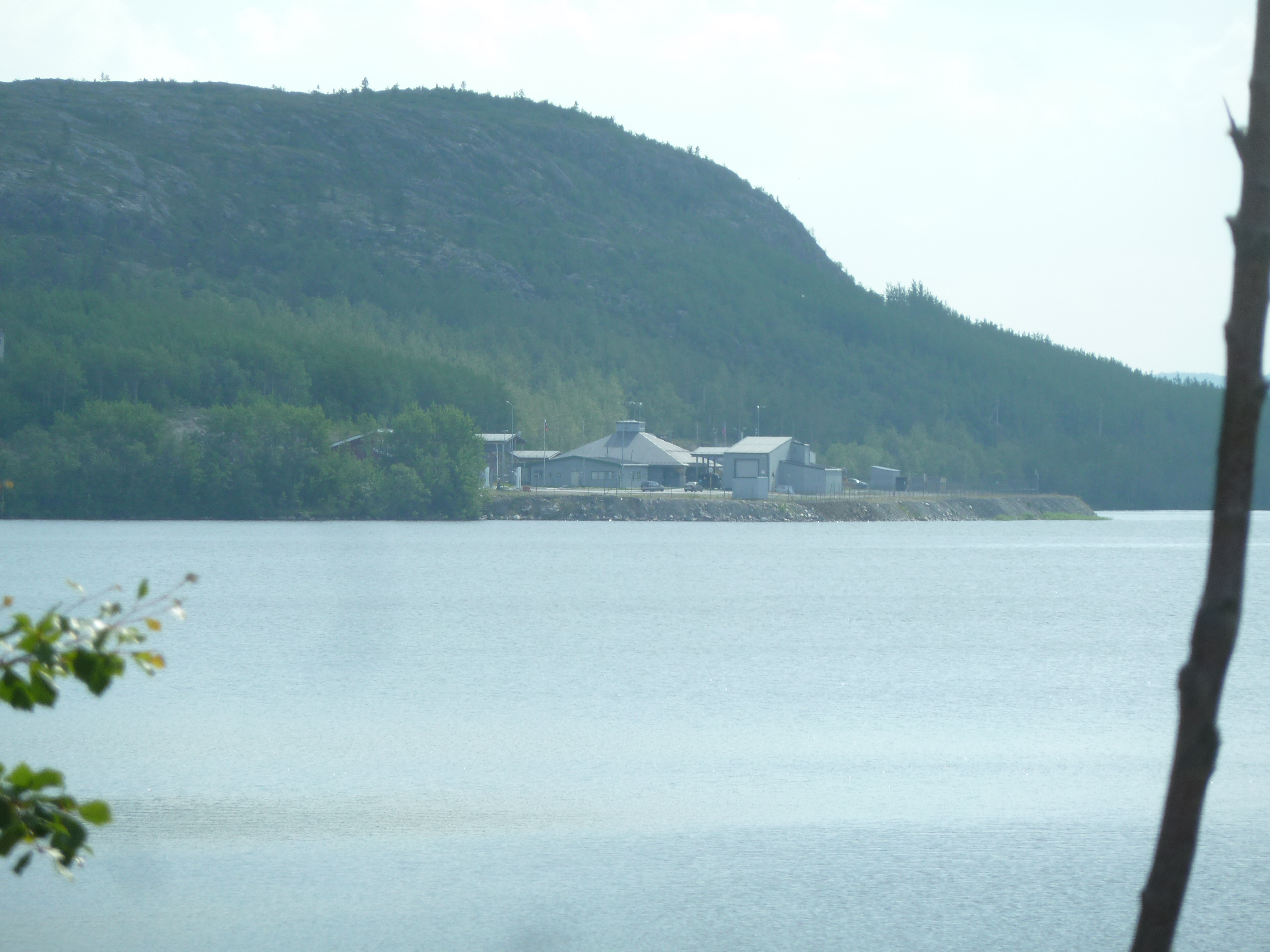
The Russian border checkpoint, as seen from Storskog, Norway

There is one legal border crossing point, with stations on both sides, at Storskog in Norway and Borisoglebsky in Russia, located on the E105 highway some 15 km east of Kirkenes. Crossing time at both stations is unpredictable and depends on the amount of traffic. Immigration control at Storskog is carried out by Eastern Finnmark Police District, while customs are carried out by the Norwegian Customs and Excise Authorities. The Norwegian Border Commissioner also has representatives at the checkpoint. It is the only one of Norway's land border crossings which does not border the Schengen Area and thus the only one manned by the police.

The Border Guard Service of Russia operates the border crossing at Borisoglebsky. It consists of a customs area and a border control area, both with independent checks. Once past Borisoglebsky travelers enter the Border Security Zone, a twenty-minute transit-only area. The road is located outside the barbed-wire fence which stretches along Russia's entire Norway and Finland border. Upon reaching the end of the transit zone there is another checkpoint at which there is performed a check of passports. Previously there was also another checkpoint located at Titovka, between Nikel and Murmansk. There are more border checkpoints today than during the Cold War.

Since 29 September 2017, a new bridge has been opened passing the Pasvik river, with the Storskog-Borisoglebsk customs stations still handling the travels between the two countries.

As of 2010 there were 140,855 border crossings, of which 19,000 were by Norwegians and the rest by Russians. There are five main motivations for trans-border traffic: shopping in border towns, business, vacation and leisure, visiting friends and relatives, and transfer to other destinations via Kirkenes Airport, Høybuktmoen. Russian residents of Murmansk Oblast, Arkhangelsk Oblast and Nenets Autonomous Okrug can obtain Pomor visas, a multi-entry Schengen visa, without an invitation. In 2010, the Russian Consulate General in Kirkenes issued 8,000 visas to Norwegians.

There is a special (almost) visa-free arrangement for a designated area of between 30 and 50 kilometres (19 and 31 mi) surrounding the border, based on a clause in the Schengen Agreement. It is only available for residents of the zone for the past three years and requires that a special ID-card be acquired from the consulate of the country to visit (a kind of multiple-journey visa). Stay is limited to 15 days. Towns within the area include Kirkenes in Norway and Nikel, Pechenga and Zapolyarny in Russia. 9,000 Norwegians and 45,000 Russians are eligible for this arrangement. After a similar agreement on border between Poland and Kaliningrad Oblast it is the second time such a visa-free border agreement has been made between Russia and part of the Schengen Area. The distance 30 km is calculated as straight distances on the map, so local Norwegians can visit Zapolyarny which is the largest city in the border area, located 11 km (7 mi) from the border, but 50 km (31 mi) from the border station by road.

There are more roads which cross the border and connect to the road network of both countries. They are not open to public. These are the two Paatsjoki river hydroelectric plants: Hevoskoski and Skogfoss. Also the historic border crossing at Skafferhullet has such a road, and there is one over the upper part of Jakobselva river.

As Norway grants the right to travel right up to the border, it is also permitted for residents of Norway to operate boats in the two border rivers and fish. All boats must be registered with the Norwegian Border Commission and registration plates must be mounted on both sides of the vessel. Boating is only permitted in daylight. Fishing and boating is only permitted on the Norwegian side of the river; however in the narrow passages of Pasvikelva it is permitted to travel through on the Russian side on the condition that the boat does not stop, except in emergencies. Parts of Pasvikelva is marked with yellow buoys along the border line during summer.

After the visa-free arrangement was activated, border trade has picked up. Norwegians buy petrol and diesel in Russia for less than half the price in Norway. This is the border in Europe with largest difference in fuel prices. Norwegians also buy some Russian products such as building material and some services like hair dressing. Products produced in EU, Japan etc. such as clothes and electronics, are more expensive in Russia because of tolls so Russians often buy them tax-free in Kirkenes. There are restrictions on food import in both directions, especially meat, and alcohol may only be imported into Norway if staying in Russia more than 24 hours, so food and alcohol are less often traded, which otherwise are the most traded goods over the Sweden-Norway and Finland–Norway borders.

During the COVID-19 pandemic, the border traffic was much lower than before, as multi-day quarantine was generally required for people wanting to cross the border.

In May 2024 the border was almost closed by Norway due to the Russian invasion of Ukraine. Only Russians with special reasons, such as having close relatives across the border, having a work or study permit, or on an approved business visit could cross it. Visas for tourism or any other non-essential visits are no longer given, and multiple-entry visas and border permits for such purposes were cancelled.

== Future ==
There are suggestions about a new larger border checkpoint to be built on the Norwegian side, as the current station has insufficient capacity to handle increased traffic, and the ground is not sufficiently stable to allow an expansion at the current site. Individual Norwegian police executives have called for a common border checkpoint located directly on the border line. This would allow for a more cost-effective and less time-consuming operation. However, Norwegian and Russian legislation, as well as the Schengen Agreement, prohibit such an operation. The Parliament of Norway's Standing Committee on Foreign Affairs and Defence has taken initiative to introduce a 24-hour-a-day opening time at the crossing; this has been rejected by the local police district, who stated that nearly all trans-border traffic is persons and that there is hardly any demand for a night service. Estimates show that border traffic may increase to 400,000 crossings by the mid- to late 2010s. The demand for a larger station remains as of 2017.

Since 1992, there have been proposals to connect the Russian railway network to Norway. Specifically this involves extending Norway's Kirkenes–Bjørnevatn Line to either Nikel or Zapolyarny, Russia, where it would connect to the Murmansk–Nikel Line. About 40 kilometres (25 mi) of railway is missing to connect the two lines. The proposal calls to develop Kirkenes as a port for export of Russian products, as Murmansk Port is less suited and under-dimensioned. Major transshipment products include metals from Norilsk Nickel, steel from Arkhangelsk and crude oil. The Murmansk–Nikel Line was built in 1936, is 206 kilometres (128 mi) long, is not electrified and is operated by the Russian Railways. As it is Russian gauge, the standard gauge Kirkenes–Bjørnevatn Line would be presumably undergo gauge conversion or receive dual gauge. A new railway would be able to transport 5 million tonnes of cargo per year.

In 2003, the cost of the necessary 40 kilometres (25 mi) of new railway was estimated at 1.4 billion Norwegian krone (NOK), while the cost of upgrading the existing Russian line was NOK 400 million. In 2007, Murmansk Oblast's governor, Yury Yevdokimov, rejected the plans for a connection to Russia, stating that his opinion was supported by President Vladimir Putin. Because Kirkenes is a better suited port than Murmansk, local authorities in Murmansk do not want to lose transshipment business to Norway. However, with the increased realism of a line to Rovaniemi, which would serve as an alternative route to Kirkenes from Russia, Russian authorities have since 2010 again supported a railway line between Kirkenes and Russia.

Following the geopolitical shifts in Europe and the Russia-Ukraine war, the future will involve implementation of larger security measures, including NATO integration. Norway is planning to increase its military presence along the border while minimizing its cooperation with Russia.

== See also ==
- Norway–Russia relations
- Norway–Soviet Union relations
- Pomor trade
- Kola Norwegians
- Finland–Russia border
