= Zolotukhin =

Zolotukhin (feminine: Zolotukhina) is a Russian-language surname. It may refer to:

- Anatoly Zolotukhin, Russian expert in petrol and natural gas industry
- Valeri Zolotukhin, Russian actor
- Dmitri Zolotukhin, Russian actor
- Nataliya Zolotukhina, Ukrainian hammer thrower
