= Spielfeld =

- Former municipality
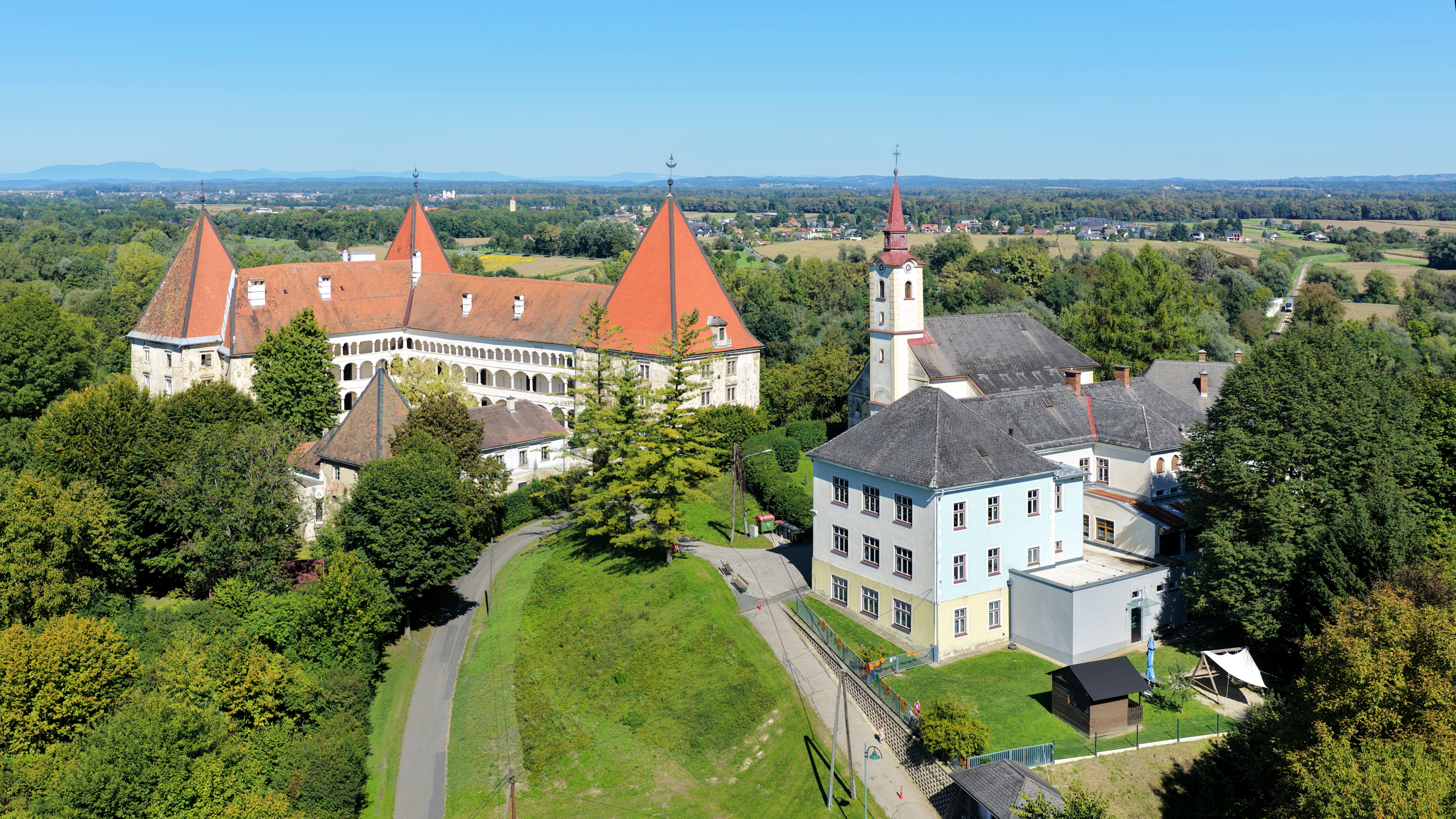

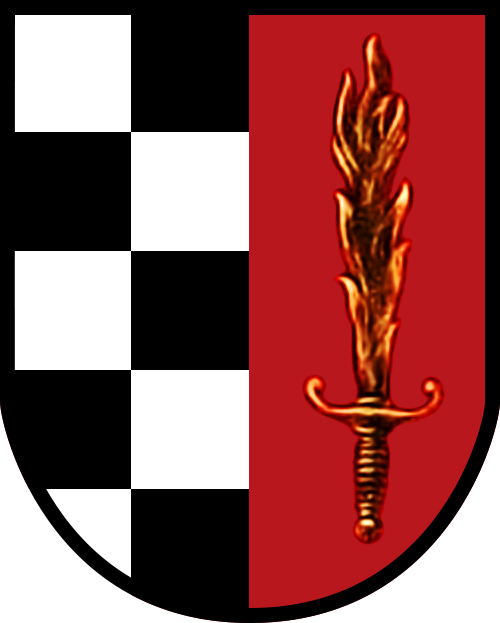
- Coat of arms

- Location within Austria
- Coordinates: 46°42′20″N 15°38′14″E
- Country: Austria
- State: Styria
- District: Leibnitz

Area
  - Total: 10.11 km^{2} (3.90 sq mi)
- Elevation: 266 m (873 ft)

Population (1 January 2016)
  - Total: 968
  - Density: 95.7/km^{2} (248/sq mi)
- Time zone: UTC+1 (CET)
  - Summer (DST): UTC+2 (CEST)
- Postal code: 8471
- Area code: 03453
- Vehicle registration: LB
- Website: Gemeinde Spielfeld

Spielfeld (Slovene: Špilje) is a former municipality in the district of Leibnitz in Austrian state of Styria. Since the 2015 Styria municipal structural reform, it is part of the municipality Straß in Steiermark. It was an Austria-Slovenia border crossing checkpoint until 21 December 2007, when all immigration and customs checks ended after Slovenia joined the Schengen Area. The Slovene town opposite Spielfeld is Šentilj.

In 2015, a new Austrian border barrier was erected at Spielfeld.

== Gallery ==
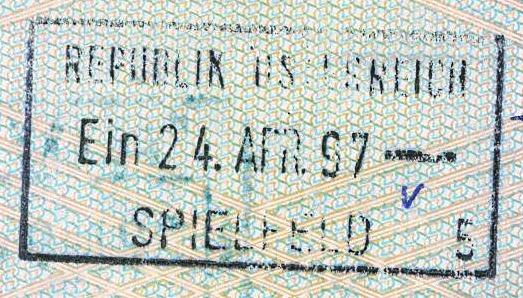
Pre-Schengen passport stamp

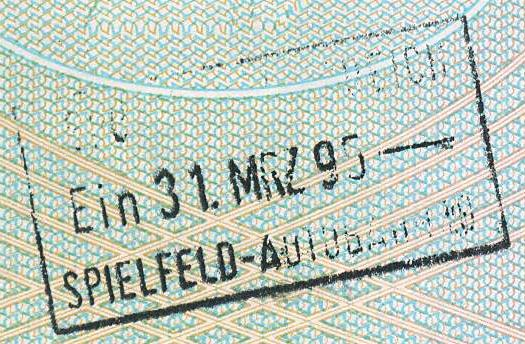
Pre-Schengen Autobahn border passport stamp

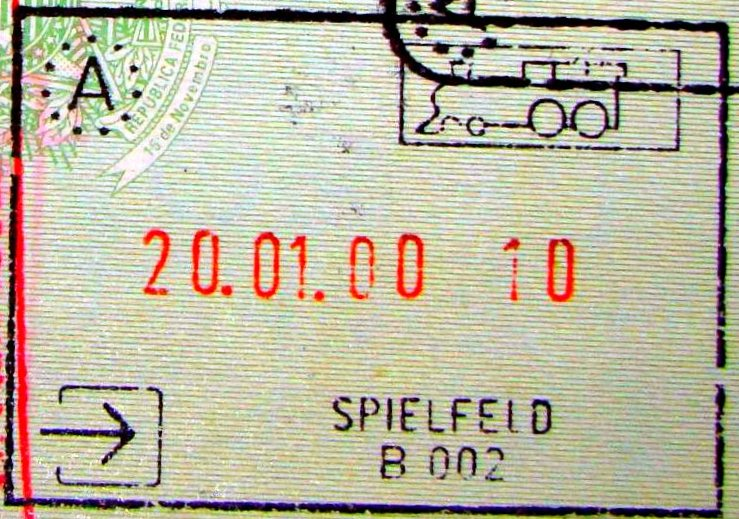
Passport stamp (before Slovenia joined the Schengen Area)
