= North Macedonia border barrier =

Barrier between North Macedonia and Greece

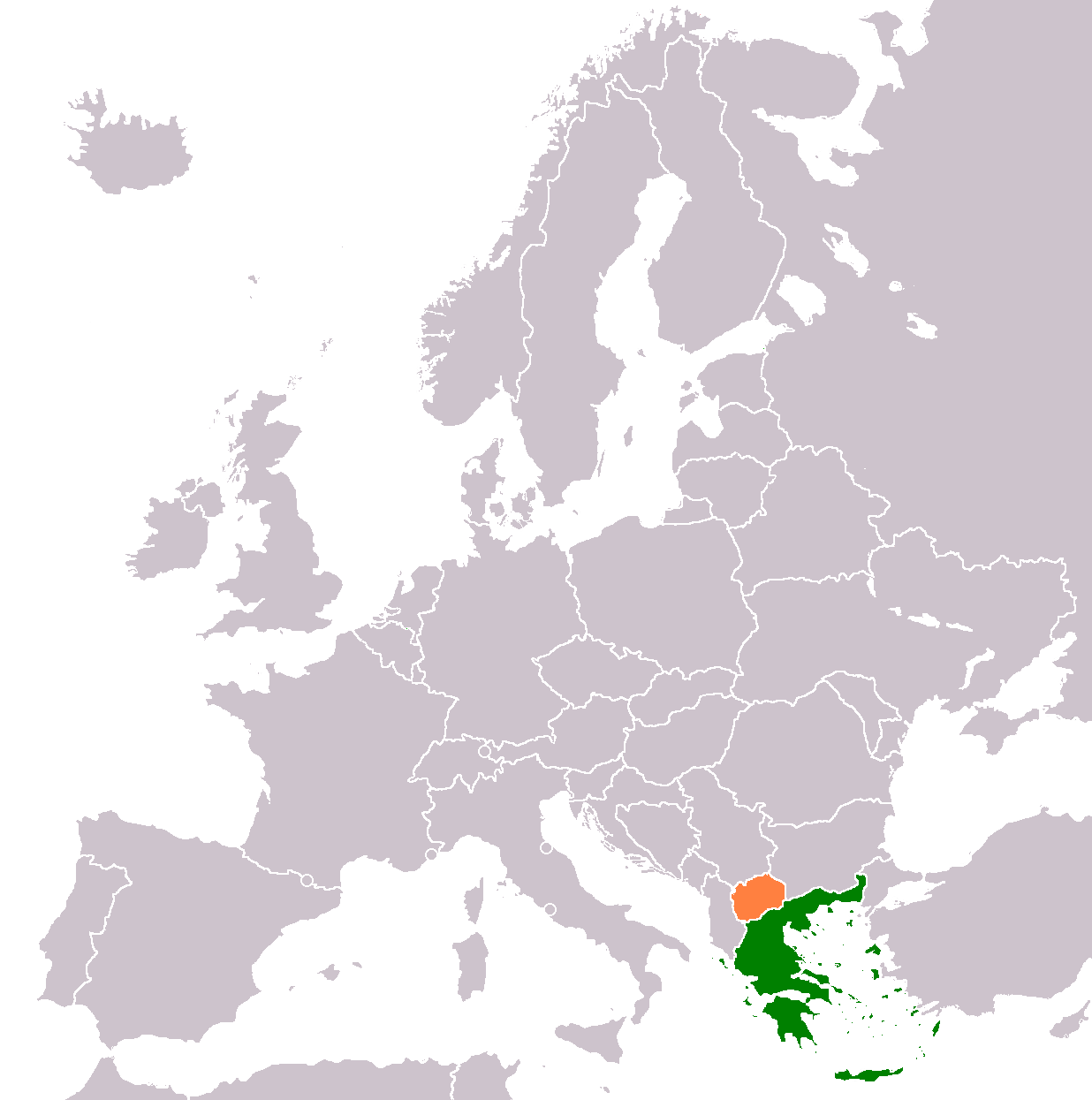
North Macedonia
Greece

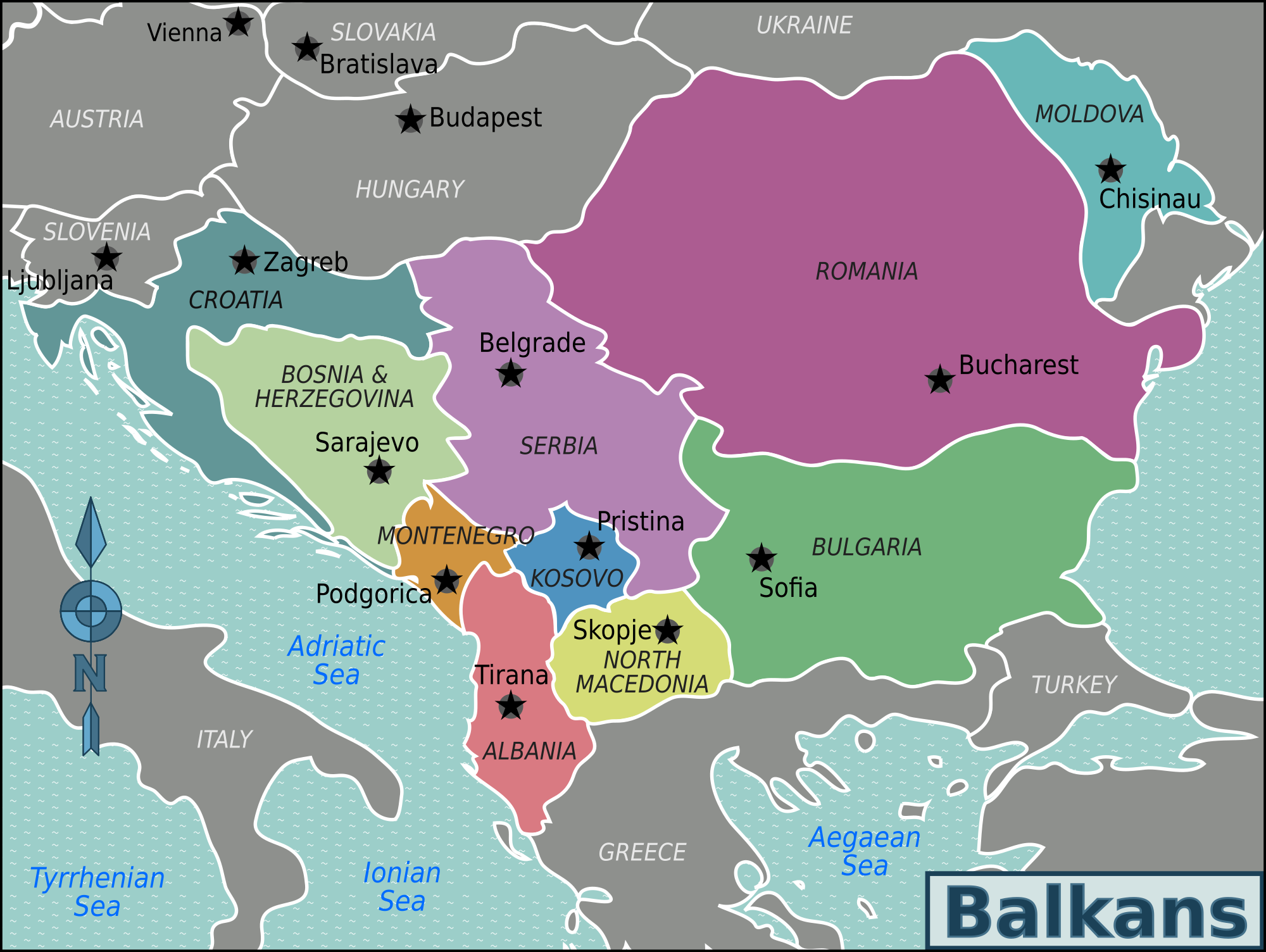
North Macedonia and its Balkan neighbors (Greece to its south in grey):
North Macedonia
Albania
Bulgaria
Kosovo
Serbia

The North Macedonia border barrier is a border barrier built by North Macedonia on its border with Greece. It was constructed as a response to the European migrant crisis. The construction of the barrier began in November 2015, modeled similarly to the Hungarian border barrier.

== History ==
On 29 November 2015, the Macedonian army began erecting fences on the Greek border. A Moroccan man was injured in an accident that led to clashes between police and migrants that injured 18. In the early stage of the construction of the barrier, Macedonian police were attacked by the migrants, according to The Guardian. In February, Macedonian soldiers began erecting a second fence meters away from the previous one.

After Austria started to limit asylum applications on its territory in February, Slovenia, Serbia, and other Balkan states imposed restrictions on migrant entries. As a result, Macedonia restricted migrant entries to its territory, which stranded thousands of migrants in Greece, especially near Idomeni border crossing. On 29 February 2016, a group of hundreds of migrants attacked riot police with stones and attempted to break the border barrier using a battering ram made from vandalized street signs and a lamp post.

The European Union gave political and financial support for the fences. It was commented that it must be extraordinary that the European Union pays a third country to protect itself from a member country.

== Idomeni migrant camp ==
In January 2016, Austria limited the number of immigrants that were allowed to be in the country at the same time. In February 2016, Austrian interior minister Mickl-Leitner announced a cap on the number of transiting migrants per day. Subsequently, Slovenia barred migrants from transiting through its territory and Macedonia announced the closure of its Greek border to migrants. Albania deployed extra police to guard its borders and received assistance from Italy in form of "men and equipment" on both land and sea. In March, Macedonia announced a plan to extend its 30 kilometres (19 miles) barrier to 320 kilometres (200 miles).

In May 2016, Reuters reported that more than 10,000 migrants were settled on the border in what has become Europe's largest refugee camp with mosques, schools, and businesses.

== See also ==
- Austrian border barrier
- Bulgarian border barrier
- Greek border barrier
- Hungarian border barrier
- Norway–Russia border barrier
- Slovene border barrier
- Greece–North Macedonia relations
- Accession of North Macedonia to the European Union
