= Austrian border barrier =

Austrian border barriers are border barriers and migration management facilities constructed by Austria between November 2015 and January 2016 on its border with Slovenia and in 2016 on its border with Italy, as a response to European migrant crisis. They are located on internal European Union borders, since Austria, Italy, and Slovenia are members of the EU and the free travel Schengen Area with a common visa policy. The barrier on the Slovenian border is several kilometres long, located near the busiest border crossing, Spielfeld-Šentilj, and includes police facilities for screening and processing migrants. Another migration management facility with barriers located on Austria's Italian border near Brenner, South Tyrol was constructed in 2016.

In February 2016, Austria initiated an agreement with Slovenia and other Balkan countries to stop the flow of migrants from Greece to Central Europe.

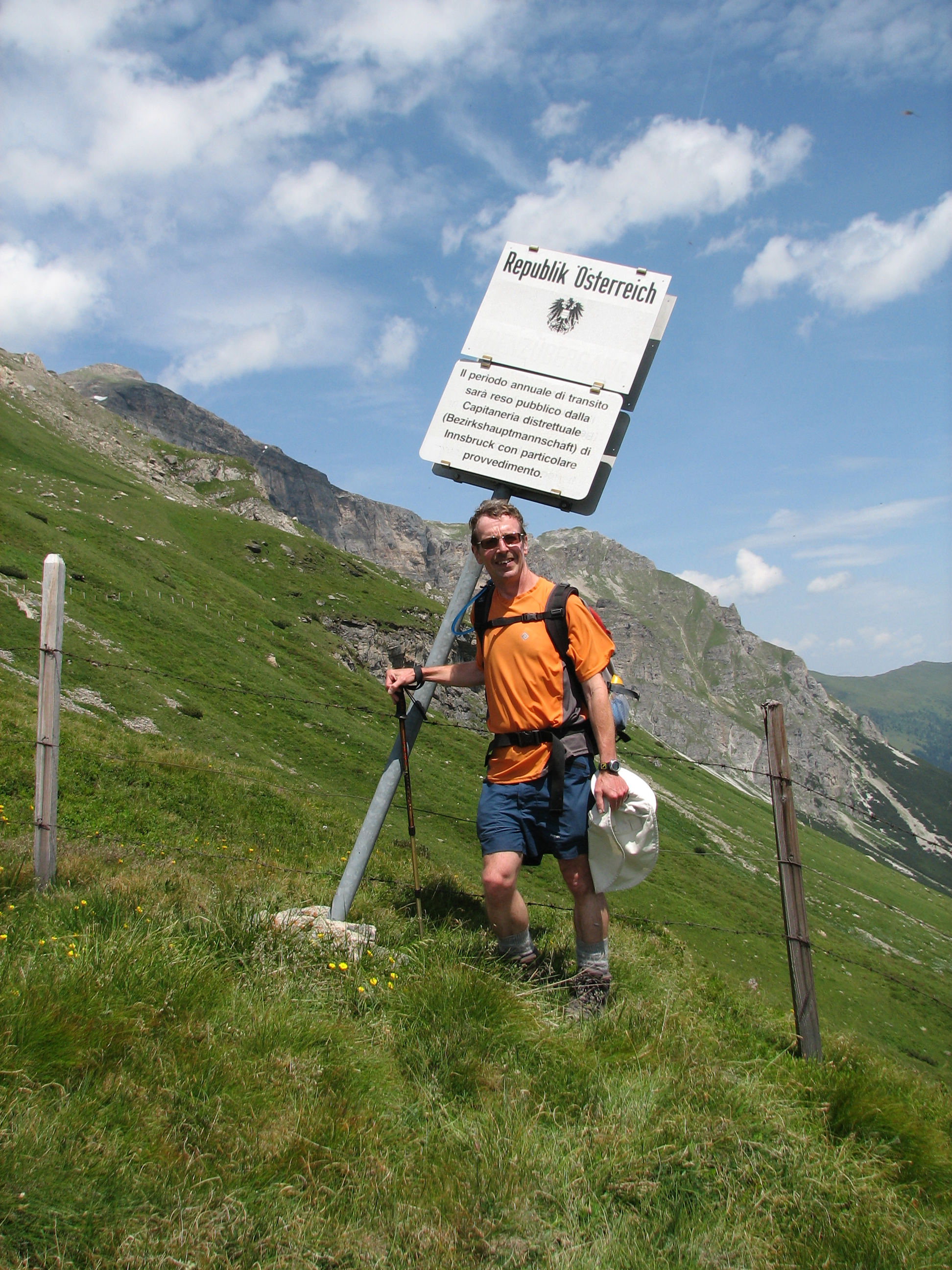
Austrian-Italian border barrier

== History ==
In November 2015, during the European migrant crisis, Austria announced its intention to begin construction of a border barrier on its border with Slovenia. The stated aim of the barrier is to help control the flow of refugees and migrants. Both Austria and Slovenia are within the Schengen Area.

The fence will initially be built along 3.7 kilometres (2.3 miles) at the busiest crossing from Slovenia into Austria, near Spielfeld. According to Austrian Interior Minister Johanna Mikl-Leitner, the barrier will be 2.2 metres high. However, preparations will be put in place to enable the construction within 48 hours' notice of a fence along a 25-kilometre (16 mi) stretch of the border, if needed. Construction began in early November. The border barrier was finished in January 2016.

Austria and the Balkan countries

In February 2016 Austrian Interior Minister Johanna Mikl-Leitner announced that Austria will allow a maximum amount of 80 asylum applications in one day and a maximum of 3,200 asylum seekers who are allowed to cross the Austrian border if they apply in another country for asylum. If one of these two numbers is reached, Austria will close its borders. At the time of this announcement 200 people a day applied for asylum in Austria.

The foreign ministers of Austria, Slovenia, and other Balkan countries met in Austria without Greece and agreed to reduce the flow of migrants into Central Europe and "sooner or later [...] to shut their doors entirely".

Another migration management facility with barriers located on the Austria-Italian border near Brenner, South Tyrol was constructed in 2016.

== Political context ==
Austria estimated that it would register 95,000 asylum claims in the first ten months of 2015, which is among the highest per-capita rates of migrant admittance within the European Union.

The move came at a time of growing domestic pressure to restrict immigration. In early November, Heinz-Christian Strache, the leader of the FPÖ, sued Chancellor Werner Faymann, Interior Minister Mikl-Leitner, Minister of Defense Gerald Klug and the ÖBB for alien smuggling and "failing to protect the country's borders" against the influx of migrants.

== See also ==
- Bulgarian border barrier
- Hungarian border barrier
- Macedonian border barrier
- Norway–Russia border barrier
- Slovenian border barrier
- Removal of Hungary's border fence with Austria
- Iron Curtain
