= Borisoglebsky, Murmansk Oblast =

Borisoglebsky Борисоглебский
- Posyolok
- Interactive map of Borisoglebsky
- Location of Borisoglebsky Borisoglebsky (Murmansk Oblast)
- Coordinates: 69°39′05.4″N 30°08′43″E
- Country: Russia
- Federal subject: Murmansk Oblast
- Administrative district: Pechengsky District
- Founded: 1961
- Elevation: 95 m (312 ft)

Population (2010 Census)
  - Total: 21
  - Estimate (2021): 26 (+23.8%)
- Time zone: UTC+3 (MSK)
- Postal code: 184420
- Dialing code: +7 81554
- OKTMO ID: 47615151106

Borisoglebsky (Russian: Борисоглебский; Skolt Sami: Ǩeeuʹŋes; Finnish: Kolttaköngäs; Norwegian: Skoltfossen) is a rural locality (a Posyolok) in Pechengsky District of Murmansk Oblast, Russia. The village is located beyond the Arctic Circle, at a height of 95 meters above sea level on the Paatsjoki River.

There is a border crossing to Storskog in Norway, the only border crossing between the two countries.

== 1968 border provocation ==
In June 1968, Boris Gleb was the venue for the largest Soviet display of aggression against Norway since the Second World War. Early in the morning on 7 June 1968, 60-70 T-54 tanks rolled towards the Norwegian border. The garrison stationed at southern Varanger was placed at the highest alert. The soldiers were given live ammunition and prepared for an armed conflict. According to the instructions they were given, any violation of the border should be fired upon. The Soviet army stopped 30 meters away, aiming their tanks at Norwegian military installations. The confrontation lasted until 10 June, when Soviet forces retired from the border area.

== Boris Gleb hydroelectric station ==
Built between 1960 and 1964, the Boris Gleb (Borisoglebskaya) hydroelectric station (Russian: Борисоглебская ГЭС (ГЭС-8)) on the Paatsjoki River is a hydroelectric station built under a water derivation system. The power station is owned and operated by TGC-1 power company.
