= Anatoly Zolotukhin =

Russian professor

Anatoly Borisovich Zolotukhin (Russian: Анатолий Борисович Золотухин; March 11, 1946 – March 13, 2022) was a Russian professor of the Gubkin Russian State University of Oil and Gas, expert in petroleum and natural gas industry. From 2008 to 2014, he was vice-president of the World Petroleum Council.
