= Storskog =

- Border control station
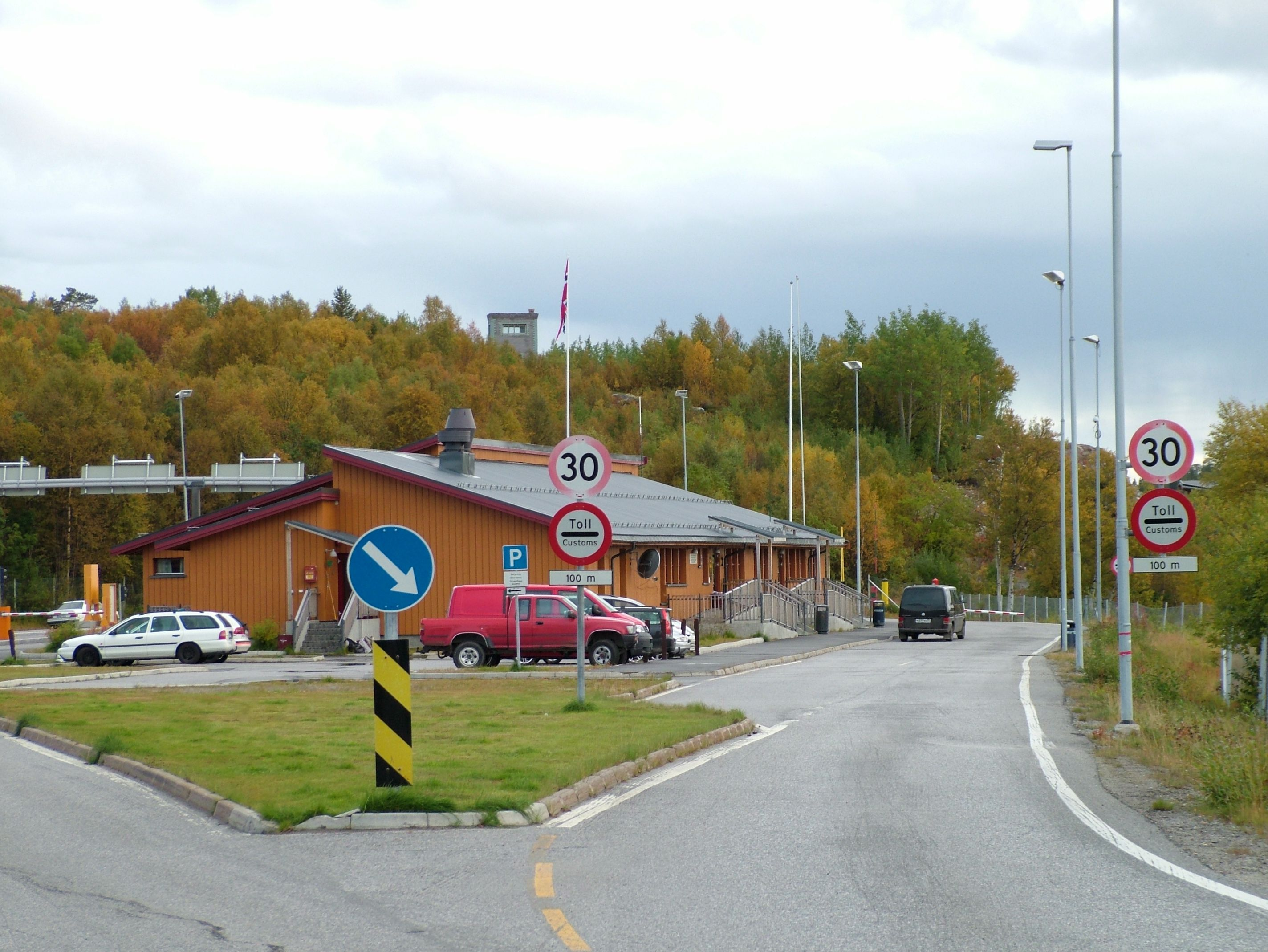
- Storskog border station from the Norwegian side. Border posts are visible between the building and the dark van. A Russian watchtower can be seen on the hill in the background.
- Interactive map of Storskog
- Coordinates: 69°39′28″N 30°12′21″E
- Country: Norway
- Region: Northern Norway
- County: Finnmark
- District: Øst-Finnmark
- Municipality: Sør-Varanger Municipality
- Elevation: 22 m (72 ft)
- Time zone: UTC+01:00 (CET)
  - Summer (DST): UTC+02:00 (CEST)

Storskog (lit. 'Big Forest') is a border crossing station on the Norwegian side of the Norway–Russia border, along the European route E105 highway. The crossing is located in Sør-Varanger Municipality in Finnmark County on the Norwegian side of the border.

The Russian side is in Boris Gleb in Pechengsky District in Murmansk Oblast. There is a border crossing station on the Russian side also, and both have to be passed to enter the opposite country. There is a duty-free shop in Russia between the stations.

Storskog is the only legal land border crossing between Norway and Russia. The station lies in the far northeastern part of Norway, about 16 kilometres (9.9 mi) east of the town of Kirkenes in Norway and about 40 kilometres (25 mi) north of Nikel.

== Traffic ==
In 2010, there were 141,000 crossings across the border at the Storskog border station. There were 320,000 crossings in 2013 and 265,177 crossings in 2017.

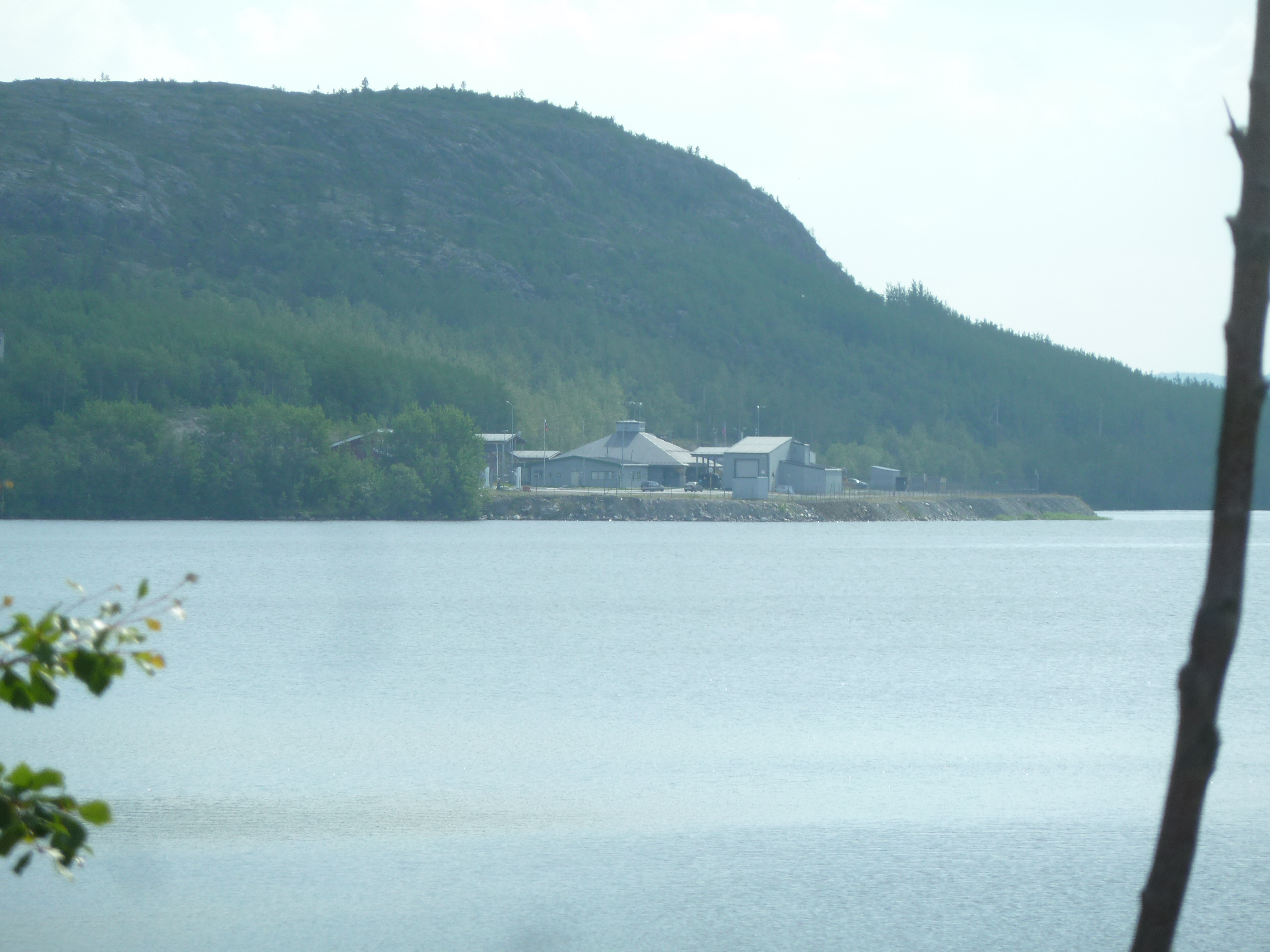
The Russian border checkpoint as seen from Storskog

== See also ==
- Nazi concentration camps in Norway
- Norway–Russia border
- Norway–Russia border barrier
