= Pasvik Nature Reserve =

Strict nature reserve in Murmansk Oblast, Russia

- IUCN category Ia (strict nature reserve)
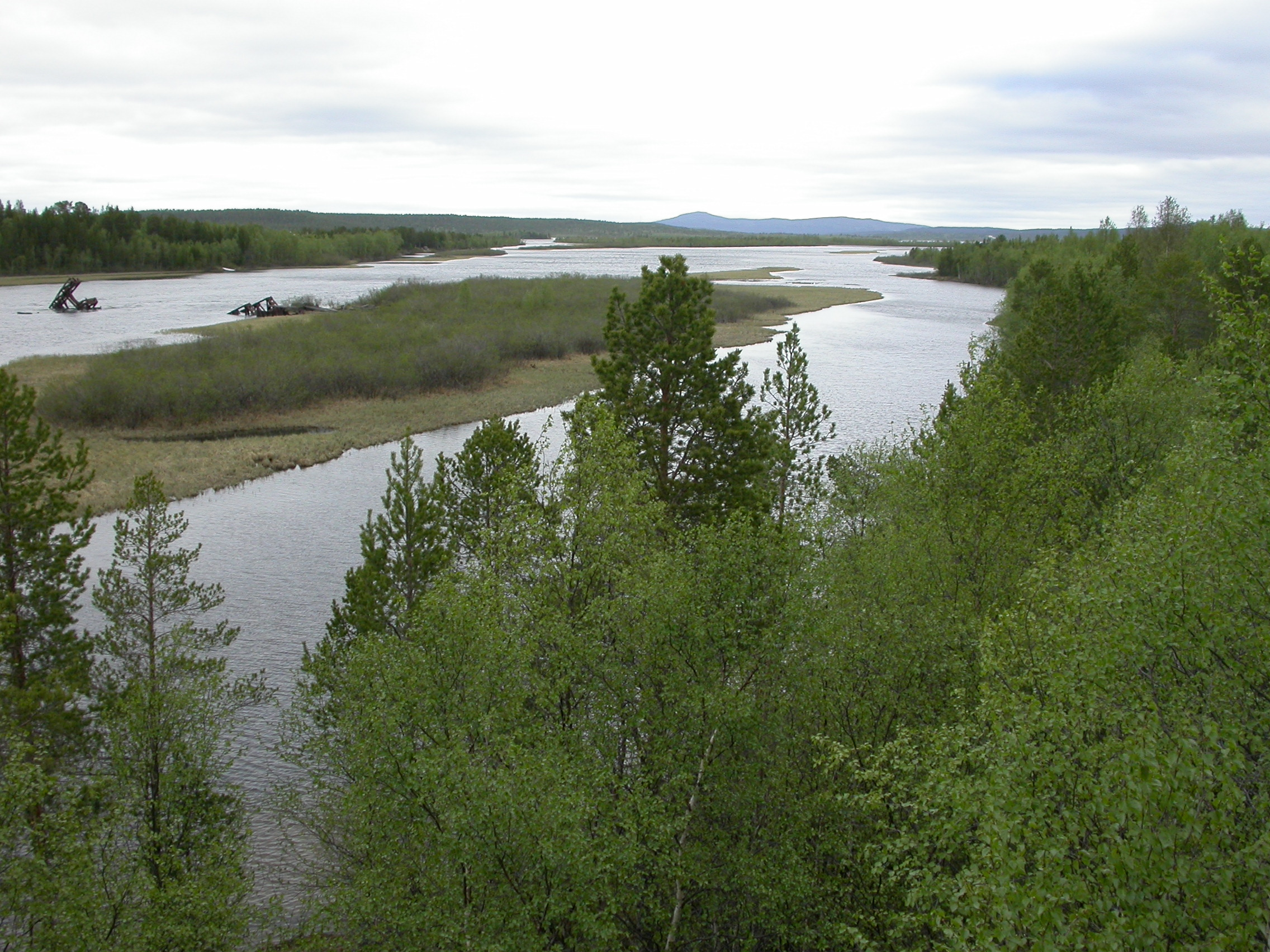
- Paz River, Pasvik Nature Reserve

- Location within Russia
- Location: Pasvikdalen, Norway and Pechengsky District, Russia
- Nearest city: Kirkenes
- Coordinates: 69°08′31″N 29°13′59″E
- Area: 166.4 km^{2} (64.2 sq mi)
- Established: 1992 / 1993
- Website: http://pasvik.org.ru/

Ramsar Wetland
- Official name: Pasvik
- Designated: 18 March 1996
- Reference no.: 810

Pasvik Nature Reserve (Norwegian: Pasvik naturreservat; Russian: заповедник Пасвик, romanized: zapovednik Pasvik) is a bilateral nature reserve located along the Norway–Russia border. It is located in the Pasvikdalen valley in Sør-Varanger Municipality in Finnmark county, Norway and in the Pechengsky District in Murmansk Oblast, Russia. The nature reserve was established in 1992 (Russia) and 1993 (Norway), and it covers an area of 166.4 square kilometers (64.2 sq mi). The Norwegian part covers 19.1 square kilometers (7.4 sq mi), while the Russian part covers 147.3 square kilometers (56.9 sq mi). The nature reserve includes unexploited parts of Pasvikelva and has a rich birdlife.

Along with Øvre Pasvik National Park and Øvre Pasvik Landscape Protection Area in Norway and Vätsäri Wilderness Area in Finland, Pasvik Nature Reserve constitutes part of Pasvik–Inari Trilateral Park.

== Geography ==
Map showing the Norwegian part of the nature reserve, along with Øvre Pasvik National Park and Øvre Pasvik Landscape Protection Area

Pasvik Nature Reserve consists of two legally separate but geographically adjoined protected areas, with a combined area of 166.4 square kilometers (64.2 sq mi). Located in the valley of Pasvikdalen, it protects the river of Pasvikelva and its vicinity, straddling the Norway–Russia border, with 31.4 square kilometers (12.1 sq mi) of its area being made up by water surface. The Norwegian segment is entirely located within Sør-Varanger. It stretches 12 kilometers (7.5 mi), from Jordanfoss in the north to the damn at Hestefoss, and is up to 5 kilometers (3.1 mi) wide covering an area of 19.1 square kilometers (7.4 sq mi), of which 4.5 square kilometers (1.7 sq mi) is water. The segment in Russia, located within Peschengsky District, is 40 kilometers (25 mi) long and runs from Svanevatn in the north to Hestfoss. The nature reserve covers the area of this stretch which is located within the Border Security Zone—i.e. from the national border to the border fence near the highway. The Russian reserve has an area of 147.3 square kilometers (56.9 sq mi), of which 26.9 square kilometers (10.4 sq mi) is water surface.

The nature reserves center on the reservoir of Fjærvann, one of the few parts of Pasvikelva which remains intact largely as it did prior to the construction of the seven hydroelectric power stations along the river. The lake and its surrounding wetland areas are among the richest Nordic areas for waders, ducks, geese and swans. Fjærvann remains the most important such area along the river, in part because it is one of the first parts of the watershed to be ice-free. On the Russian side the reserve also includes a comparatively large area of pine forest area which is not directly related to Fjærvann, while the Norwegian side only include the reservoir and its immediate surroundings.

The geology of the area formed at the transition of the Mesoarchean and Neoarchean Eon, 2.8 billion years ago. It contains areas which are mineral-rich, which has resulted in an iron ore mine at Bjørnevatn and a nickel mine in Nikel. A belt known as the Petsamo Formation cuts through the reserve; its limestone-rich rocks give rise to birch, which contrasts the otherwise pine-dominated forests of the area. The landscape consists of hills, moraines and melt-water deposits, supplemented with kettles and glacial erratics. The landscape has been formed by two periods of ice sheets during the Quaternary glaciation, which has rounded all rock features in the area.

The areas in the reserve with good drainage are dominated with podzol soil. Areas with less drainage are dominated by mire, the most dominating part of the landscape, with high concentration of peat. In some places there is sand sediment deposits create heaths. Near the lakes there are occasional parties of scree.

== Hydrology ==
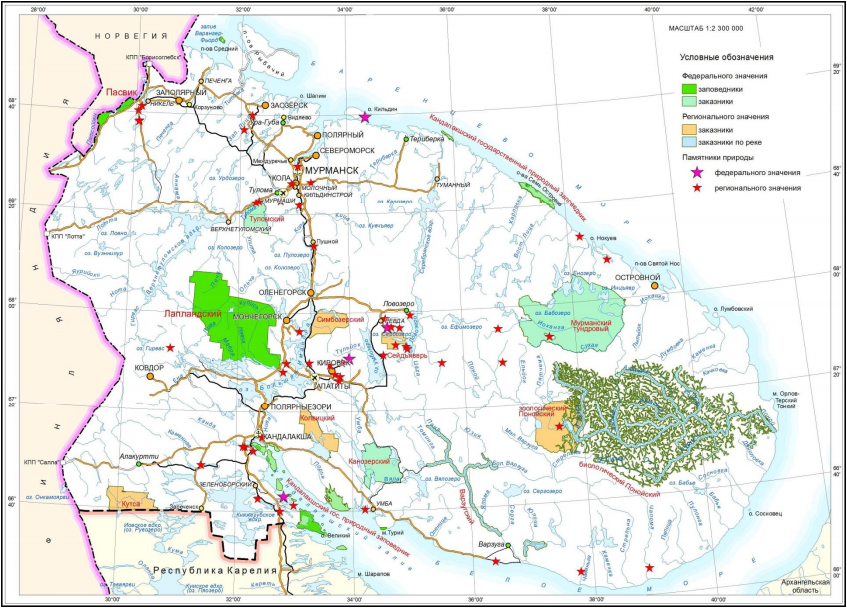
Map showing protected areas within Murmansk Oblast, including the Russian part of Pasvik Nature Reserve

Pasvikelva runs through the reserve in the valley of Pasvikdalen. The 147-kilometer (91 mi) river has its headwater in Lake Inari and its mouth at Bøkfjorden of the Barents Sea, experiencing a total fall of 119 meters (390 ft). Because of the valley's flat and wide shape, the river is shallow, ranging from 1 to 8 meters (3 ft 3 in to 26 ft 3 in), and from several hundred meters to several kilometers wide.

The river originally consisted of a series of lakes connected by short waterfalls. This was altered during the construction of seven hydroelectric power stations. This has given an even flow of water throughout the year and the original river course has only been preserved in select locations. Each of the damns has created its own reservoir, which have their lowest water levels in April, typically 80 to 100 centimeters (31 to 39 in) below the peak level. The reservoirs are iced up from October to May.

== Climate ==
The climate is dominated by cold winds from the Arctic Ocean and mild winds from the Atlantic. Northern winds are most common during summer, which can occasionally give snow in mid-summer. Mean July temperature is 14.4 °C (57.9 °F), with a peak registered temperature of 30 °C (86 °F). Mean January temperature is −13.6 °C (7.5 °F). There is midnight sun from 23 May to 20 July and polar night from 20 November to 23 January.

In general there is more low pressure areas in the winter and higher pressure during summer. Most of the annual mean 358 millimeters (14.1 in) of precipitation falls during summer, qualifying the area as a semi-arid climate. However, high groundwater, low evaporation and that most of the rain falls during the growth season results in relatively good growth conditions. The first snowfall arrives in September or October and remains until April. Snow depths normally reach 60 to 70 centimeters (24 to 28 in). The reserve's climate classification is Humid continental climate, cool summer (Köppen climate classification (Dfc)).

== Flora ==
Russian scientists have classified the vegetation as forest tundra and taiga, while Norwegian scientists have classified it as northern boreal ecosystem, with northern parts forming a gradient into an Alpine tundra zone. The most common trees are Scots pine, while the European spruce is less common. Pine trees can reach a height of 14 to 15 meters (46 to 49 ft). There are occasional areas with broad-leaved trees, including aspen, rowan, alder and goat willow. The Russian section contains sections of old-growth forest. The northernmost parts of the reserve has birch.

The vegetation sees a mix of mountainous species and Siberian species normally found only as far west as the Kola Peninsula. Mountainous species not commonly found in such wet and lowland areas include snow saxifrage and alpine chickweed and marsh Labrador tea. There are three types of mire. The most dominant is rice mire, covered in marsh Labrador tea, cup lichen and heather. The other are grass mires which are dominated by cottongrass and carex and string mire which have predominantly Sphagnum. Rubus chamaemorus are common throughout the mires.

== Fauna ==
Pasvik is at the intersection between western and eastern species, and between the forest-tundra and Arctic tundra. Common frog is the only amphibian and the viviparous lizard is the only reptile. There are 34 species of mammals in the national park. The only non-wild animals are reindeer. Mice are the most commons, especially the Eurasian pygmy shrew. The only true Arctic species is the Norway lemming. Larger species include the brown bear, a declining number of wolverines, and moose, and a growing number of wolves, in addition to other common, smaller mammals. The American mink is an introduced species which has become quite common.

The most commons species of fish in the river are Coregonus lavaretus, European perch and northern pike, all three which have been the basis for sustenance fishing. Less commons species include burbot, grayling and brown trout. Five thousand trouts are set out each year to sustain the population. Especially the lake Kaskamajärvi has a large trout population. The lower portion of the river previously had some Atlantic salmon, but these have all but disappeared since the hydroelectric stations were installed. Uncommon fish species include European river lamprey, three-spined stickleback, nine-spined stickleback and common minnow. Vendace is an introduced species in Lake Inari and has spread to the reserve.

The area is known for its diversity of birds, with 212 species having been recorded as of 1987. Of these, 68 commonly breed, 30 breed occasionally, and 14 which have bred previously. Common birds include the black-throated loon, the bean goose and various species of ducks. Egg-gathering was previously popular from the common goldeneye. Common predator birds include the rough-legged buzzard and merlin, while the white-tailed eagle and golden eagle are less common. The short-eared owl is the most common owl. Waders are abundant along the river, the most common being common ringed plover, ruff and spotted redshank. Other common birds are the common gull, Arctic tern and sparrows.

== History ==
The oldest archaeological finds in Pasvikdalen date to Stone Age and the Komsa culture. These nomadic people would arrive in the valley during summer and sustained themselves largely on fishing in the river. The oldest historic records of the area date to the 16th century, by which time the Skolts were inhabiting the area, which had organized the valley as a siida. The Pasvik area was traditionally located in a common Norwegian and Russian area without a defined national border. When the border was established in 1826, after which the population moved to the Russian side of the border. The valley later received a limited Norwegian population and from the 1850s immigration from Finland, both on the Norwegian and Russian side of the border. The area around the reserved remained unpopulated. The area became part of the Finnish Civil War, when Finland secured a corridor to the Arctic Ocean. This was subsequently reverted following the Winter War in 1939–1940.

The first major interest in the ornithology of the area arose following the inspections leading to the border in 1826. Also the flora was found to be rich, as it was in the intersection of the western and eastern vegetation zones, giving a unique mix of vegetation. The most important work was carried out by Hans Tho. L. Schaanning and Johan Koren, who settled in the valley in 1900. The area was also of interest for Swedish and Russian expeditions and scientists. Schaanning remained for twelve years.

Norway considered the area for conservation from 1978, with arguments being related to the wetland areas importance for aquatic birds and especially Fjærvann. Fjærvann was subsequently included in Norway's list of possible Ramsar sites. In the late 1980s a joint Norwegian–Russian environmental agreement was signed, and discussion of a joint nature reserve commenced at a meeting in Murmansk in 1989. Common inspections were carried out in 1990, after which the Russian authorities indicated that they would include comparatively large areas of pine forest on their side of the river in a protected area.

== Management ==
The rationale to protect the area is to conserve a wilderness area which is important habitat for ducks, geese, waders and whooper swans. The reserve is also in place to protect the original river bed. Coordination of the management on the Norwegian side is the responsibility of the County Governor of Finnmark. Day-to-day management is carried out by the Kirkenes office of the Norwegian Nature Inspectorate, a division of the Norwegian Environment Agency. The same agency is responsible for management of the national park and landscape protection area.

The Russian reserve is managed through separate entity organized to manage the reserve. Management differs considerably, in that the reserve is used as a basis for extensive research. Each year a Nature Chronicle is published about the park.

Along with Øvre Pasvik National Park and Øvre Pasvik Landscape Protection Area in Norway and Vätsäri Wilderness Area in Finland, Pasvik Nature Reserve constitutes part of Pasvik–Inari Trilateral Park.

== Bibliography ==
- Ryvarden, Leif (2007). Norges nasjonalparker: Stabbursdalen, Øvre Pasvik og Øvre Anárjohka (in Norwegian). Oslo: Gyldendal Norsk Forlag. ISBN 978-82-05-37638-0.
- Wikan, Steinar; Makarova, Olga; Aarseth, Trond (1994). Pasvik – Пасвик (in Norwegian and Russian). Oslo: Grøndahl Dreyer. ISBN 82-504-2117-5.
