= Vätsäri Wilderness Area =

Wilderness area in Inari, Finland

- IUCN category Ib (wilderness area)
- Location within Finland
- Location: Lapland, Finland
- Coordinates: 69°08′N 28°21′E
- Area: 1,550 km^{2} (600 sq mi)
- Governing body: Metsähallitus

The Vätsäri Wilderness Area (Finnish: Vätsärin erämaa, Swedish: Vätsäri ödemarksområde) is located along the northeastern shore of Lake Inari in Inari, northern Finland, stretching all the way to the Finland–Norway border. The landscape is dominated by taiga forests of Scots pine, bog and bodies of water. The northeastern part rises as a treeless fell ridge. Vätsäri is one of twelve wilderness areas in Lapland and covers an area of 1,550 square kilometers (600 sq mi). The wilderness has one marked trail and a few cabins. The reserve is under the management of Metsähallitus (Administration of Forests) and was established with the other wilderness reserves in 1991. It is part of Pasvik–Inari Trilateral Park along with Øvre Pasvik National Park and Øvre Pasvik Landscape Protection Area in Norway, and the joint Norwegian–Russian Pasvik Nature Reserve.

The area has a short growing season, cold winters, little precipitation and poor soil quality created by the gneiss bedrock. Lake Inari has been affected by acid rain and loss of fish from the Paatsjoki River Hydroelectric Plants. The reserve is an important habitat of the brown bear and also has a large moose population; reindeer husbandry is practiced by the Sámi. Whitefish and vendace are the most common species of fish, the latter being an introduced species.

== Geography ==
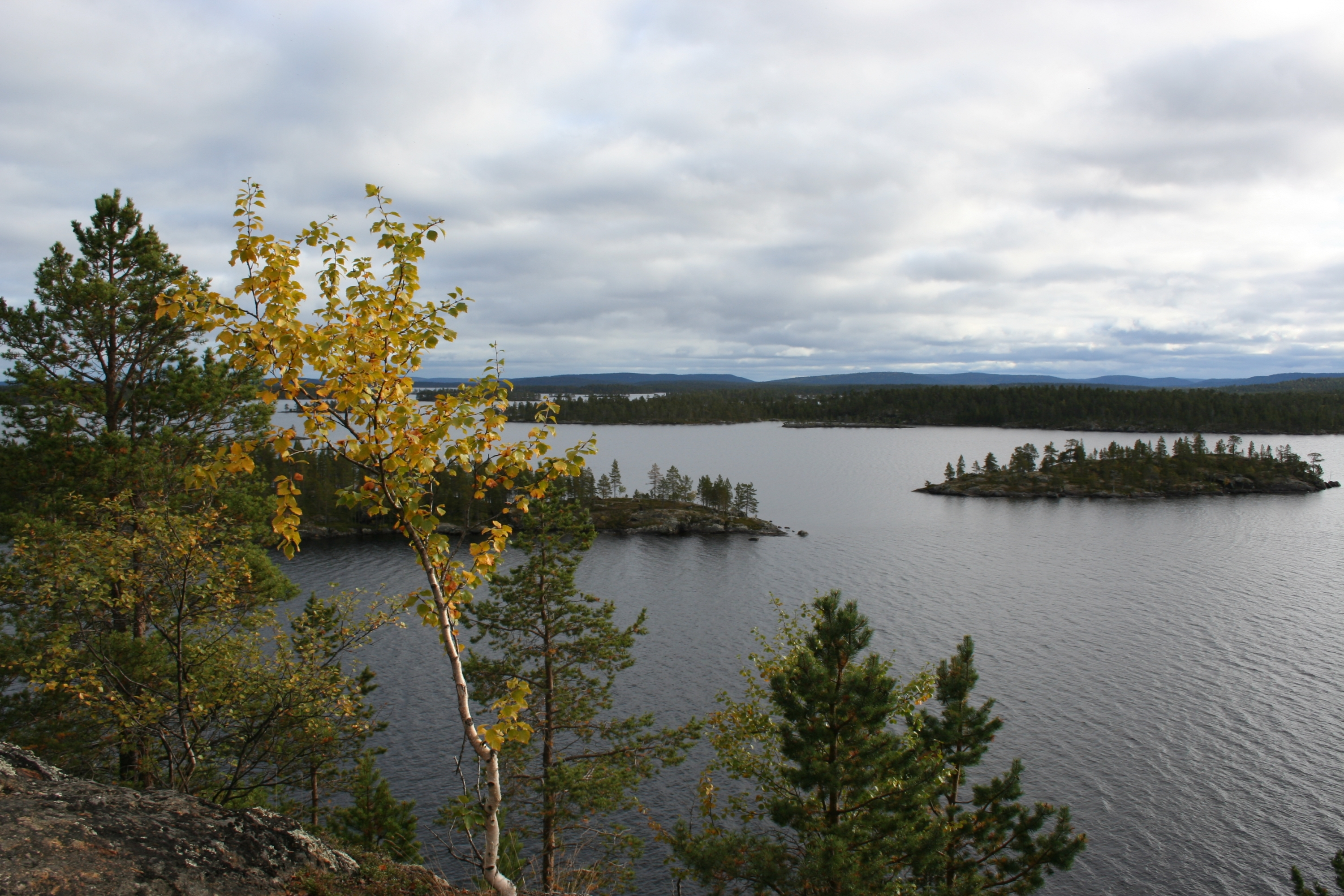
Islands of Lake Inari

The wilderness area is located on the northeastern shore of Lake Inari and extends northeastwards into a treeless fell ridge. It is located entirely within the municipality of Inari, and the reserve's eastern border is the Finland–Norway border. The landscape consists of taiga forests of Scots pine in the lower areas, bog, thousands of small lakes, and creeks. The reserve covers an area of 1,550 square kilometers (600 sq mi). Most streams in Vätsäri flow into Lake Inari, which has the Pasvik River as its outflow. Construction of the Paatsjoki River Hydroelectric Plants has changed the hydrology considerably, providing for a more stable regulation of Lake Inari, but reducing the flow speed. Water levels are now highest during autumn and lowest during spring, opposite of before.

The bedrock consists of basement gneiss with occasional slate and volcanic rock. The Inari Basin was created after the last glacial period when an ice blockage in the Pasvik River hindered the draining of melted water in the area. The climate is harsh and allows only a limited growing season of between 110 and 120 days. Temperatures may rise to 25 °C (77 °F) during summer, but fall to −40 °C (−40 °F) in winter. The northeastern part of the reserve is moderated by the Barents Sea and so winter temperatures are higher and there is less snow. Precipitation is 200 to 500 millimeters (8 to 20 in) during the year, half of which falls during the growing season. Not until June does the ice melt. Some lakes in the eastern part of the Wilderness are damaged by acid rain from the Norilsk Nickel plant in Nikel, Russia.

== History ==
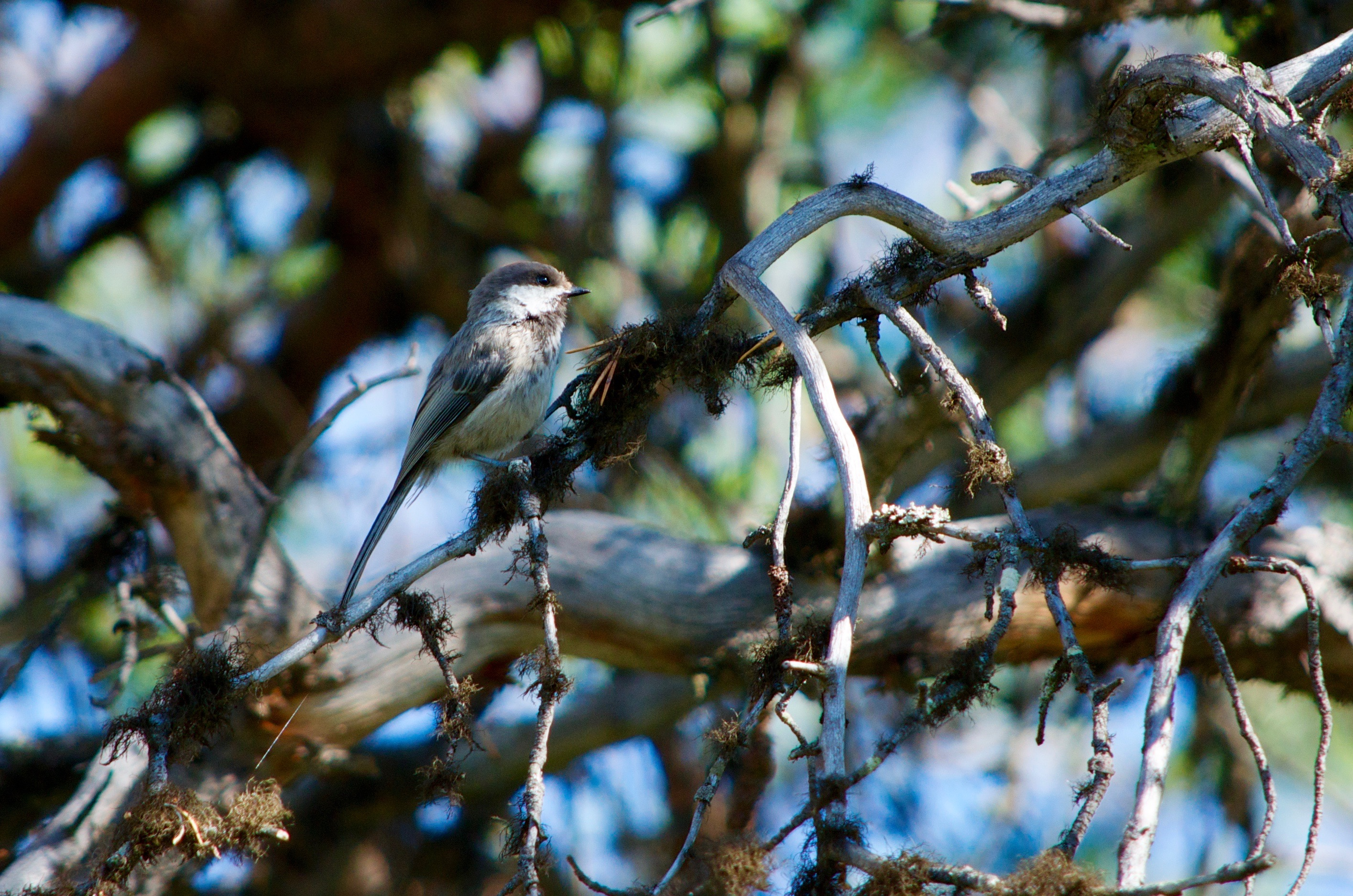
Grey-headed chickadee (Poecile cinctus) in Vätsäri

The area was populated in the Stone Age by Inari Sami people shortly after the last glacial period ended about 8000 BC. The first documents from the area are tax records from the 16th century. The Inari Sami originally subsisted on hunting, gathering and especially fishing; later they began to complement this by reindeer husbandry, and later still by farming and herding cattle and sheep. The area belonged to the Inari Siida beginning in the Middle Ages. Until the border was closed in 1852, the Sami from Norway came during winter to herd their reindeer. The closing of the border caused some Norwegian Sami to settle in the area and continue with reindeer husbandry. This caught on among the Inari Sami, and the amount of husbandry increased during the 20th century. People in the area traveled up Lake Inari and onwards to the coast of Finnmark, Norway, to fish during summer. Records of markets in Finnmark date back to the 16th century, and in the 1880s about 150 people traveled to the coast each year. Logging in the southern part boomed during the 1920s, when logs were driven down the Pasvik River to Elvenes and Jakobsnes in Norway. Previously there were birch forests in the fells, but in the 1960s their leaves were eaten by the caterpillar of the autumnal moth, leaving the fells barren. The construction of the Paatsjoki River Hydroelectric Plants starting in the 1940s had a strong negative effect on the fish population; in 1976 the authorities therefore enforced the obligatory introduction of fish in Lake Inari.

The twelve wilderness areas in Lapland were all created in 1991 to protect both the natural wilderness and the Sami culture. These areas combined cover an area of 14,903 square kilometers (5,754 sq mi), where such activities as road construction and mining are prohibited, as is logging in some areas. Pasvik–Inari Trilateral Park was established in several steps: Øvre Pasvik National Park was created in 1970, the Russian part of Pasvik Nature Reserve was established in 1992, and the Norwegian part created the following year. In 2003 the national park was expanded and Øvre Pasvik Landscape Protection Area was established, creating a continually protected area spanning three countries.

== Management ==
The wilderness area is managed by Metsähallitus a government agency which manages the state-owned land in Finland. The area is not a strictly protected area, instead falling into the Natura 2000 network. Limitations include the mandatory maintenance of forests in their natural state and a ban on logging. The sale and leasing of land is prohibited, as is construction of permanent roads and mining.

== Nature ==
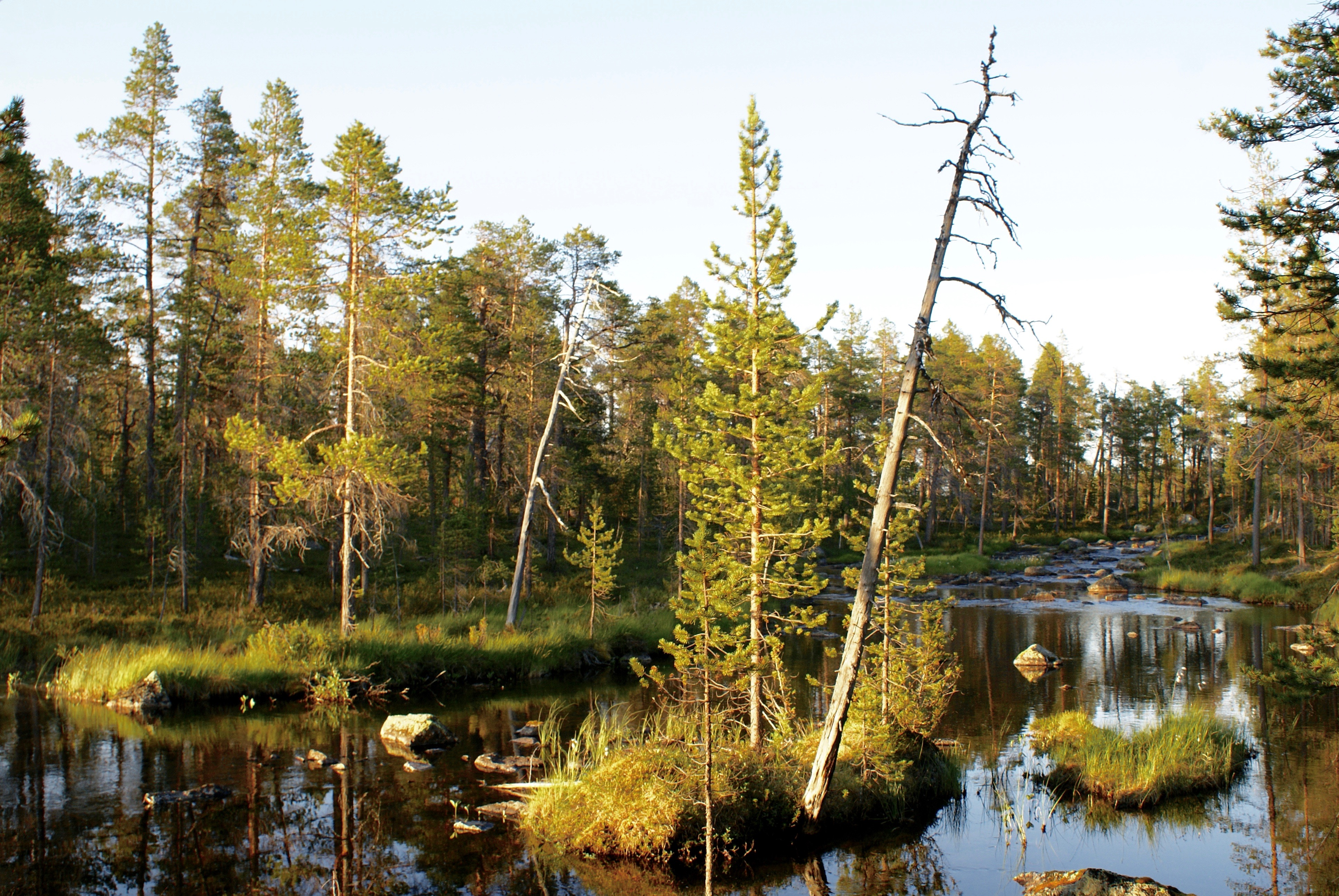
River Kapperijoki in the central part of the area.

The area shares a common brown bear population with Norway and Russia. Other predators include red fox, stoat, pine marten and the rare wolverine and Eurasian lynx. The gray wolf was common until the 1940s. There is also a large population of moose. Inari–Pasvik has a shared population of 6,000 reindeer, which are herded to different areas depending on the season. Fences have been installed to hinder reindeer from wandering across the national borders.

Whitefish and vendace are the most common fish species in Lake Inari, the latter having been accidentally naturalized. Lake trout can be caught in creeks. Other fish found in the park include Arctic char, grayling, pike, perch, burbot, three-spined stickleback, ninespine stickleback and minnow. Stocking with fish has resulted in the introduction of Atlantic salmon, vendace and lake trout.

The lower areas of the wilderness area are covered by a taiga forest of Scots pine. Less common trees include downy birch, goat willow, aspen and rowan. Logging in the past has mostly occurred in the southern part ("Kessi"), a large proportion of Vätsäri's forests being old-growth forests. The barren soil makes for poor growth conditions and most of the ground vegetation in the forests is subshrubs. One area with limestone rock features green spleenwort. The reserve is located in an area between a western and eastern vegetation zones, giving rise to unique combinations of species, such as Siberian spruce and red cottongrass.

== Recreation ==
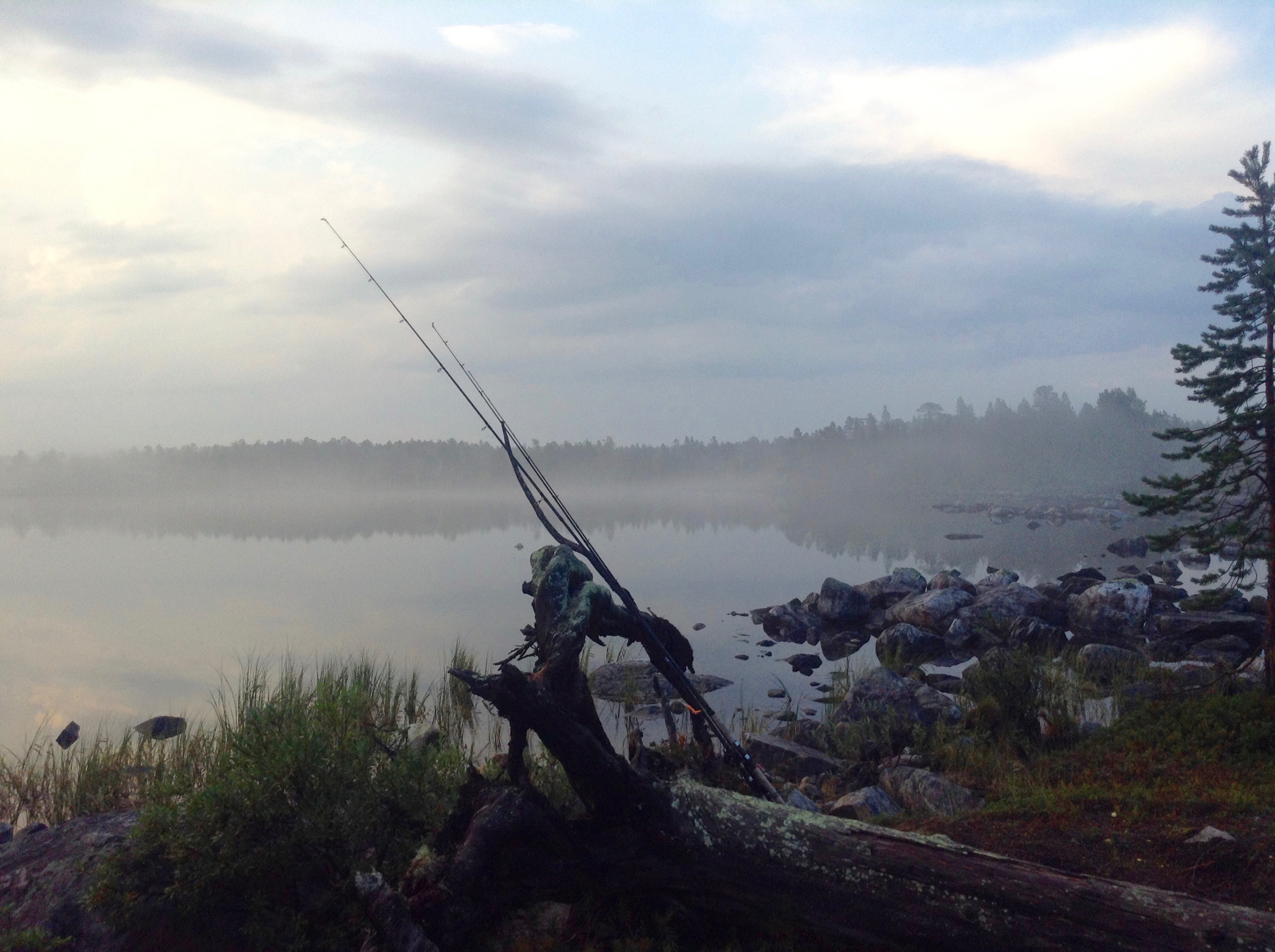
Fishing is a popular recreational activity.

Most recreation takes place around Lake Inari, although a limited number of visitors hike into the fells. The reserve is a demanding hiking area and inexperienced hikers are recommended to avoid traversing the wilderness. The freedom to roam grants everyone the right to hike, ski and short-term camping everywhere in the area. The park can be accessed from National Road 971 and 969; public transport is available to Nellim.

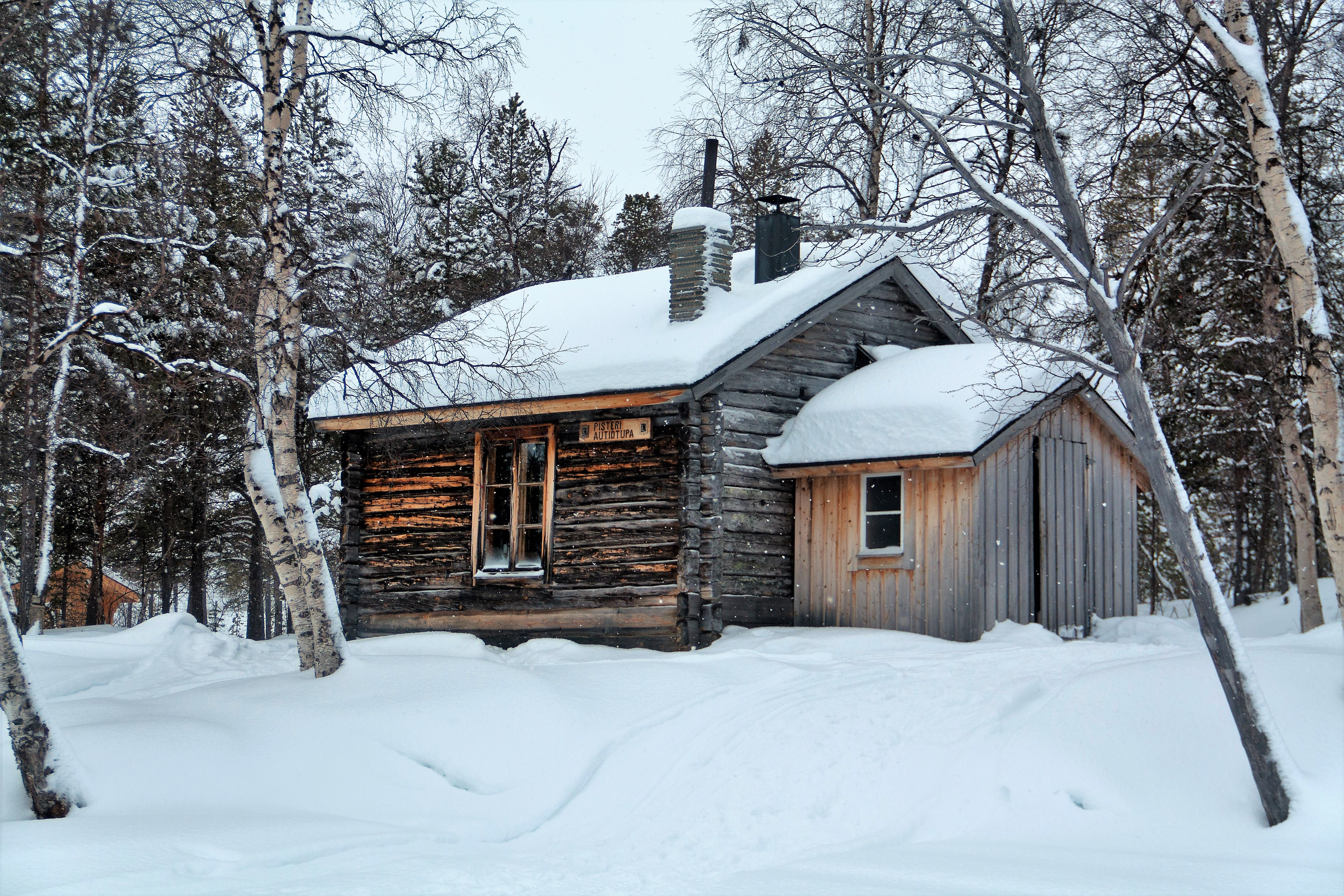
Pisteri wilderness hut, one of four such huts in Vätsäri.

The Piilola Trail is the only marked trail in the park; it is 35 kilometers (22 mi) and connects the reserve to Øvre Pasvik National Park. Its northern starting point is at Sortbryststjern in Norway and the southern end is at Kessintie Road. The trail is so demanding that it is not recommended for beginners. Lake Inari offers good fishing, making it a popular visitor attraction in the reserve. Boating on the lake is popular and harbors are located in Inari, Veskoniemi and Nellim, in addition to several places where boats can be launched. The open parts of the lake can be stormy. There is a canoeing route which connects Lake Inari to several adjacent lakes, with two open wilderness huts along the route. During winter there is a snowmobile route between Nuorgam, Näätämö, Sevettijärvi, Nellim, Ivalo and Inari.
