= Øvre Pasvik National Park =

National park in Finnmark, Norway

- IUCN category II (national park)
- Interactive map of Øvre Pasvik National Park
- Location: Sør-Varanger, Norway
- Nearest city: Kirkenes
- Coordinates: 69°6′N 28°50′E
- Area: 119 km^{2} (46 sq mi)
- Established: 6 February 1970, enlarged 2003
- Governing body: Øvre Pasvik nasjonalparkstyre

Øvre Pasvik National Park (Norwegian: Øvre Pasvik nasjonalpark, Northern Sami: Báhčaveaji álbmotmeahcci, Skolt Sami: Paččjooǥǥ meermeäʹcc) is located in the southeastern part of the Pasvikdalen valley in southern Sør-Varanger Municipality in Finnmark county, Norway. Covering an area of 119 square kilometers (46 sq mi), the national park is dominated by Siberian-like taiga consisting of old-growth forests of Scots pine, shallow lakes and bog. Proposals for a national park in Øvre Pasvik were first launched in 1936, but the park was not created until 6 February 1970. It originally covered 66 square kilometers (25 sq mi), but was expanded on 29 August 2003. Øvre Pasvik is part of Pasvik–Inari Trilateral Park along with the adjacent Øvre Pasvik Landscape Protection Area, the joint Norwegian and Russian Pasvik Nature Reserve, and Finland's Vätsäri Wilderness Area.

The park has its western border running along the Finland–Norway border. The two most prominent lakes are Ellenvatnet and Ødevatnet, both of which flow into tributaries of the river Pasvikelva. The fauna and flora are typical of the Siberian taiga, and include some species uncommon for Norway. The park is a habitat for the brown bear and also has a large population of moose; reindeer husbandry takes place during winter. Eight species of fish live in the lakes and the park has 190 species of flowering plants.

== Geography ==
The national park covers an area of 119 square kilometers (46 sq mi). It is located in the southernmost part of Sør-Varanger and covers the southwestern part of the valley of Pasvikdalen. The park's western border is identical to the Finland–Norway border. The eastern border crosses through the lakes of Ivergammevatnet, Revsaksfjellet and Ødevatnet. Treriksrøysa, the tripoint cairn located at the intersection of the Finland–Norway–Russia border, is within the park. To the east is Øvre Pasvik Landscape Protection Area and Pasvik Nature Reserve, which both lie along the Norway–Russia border. The park is part of Pasvik–Inari Trilateral Park, which in addition to the three Norwegian protected areas includes Vätsäri Wilderness Area on the Finnish side of the border and the Russian part of Pasvik Nature Reserve.

Map of the national park and the surrounding area

The area is exceptionally flat by Norwegian standards. It consists of large rolling hills with forest, shallow lakes and numerous tarns. The land is covered in an old-growth forest of Scots Pine, intertwined with bog. The park rises slightly towards the west. The climate is dry, with an average 350 millimeters (14 in) precipitation per year. The winters are cold, −45 °C (−49 °F) having been measured. There are 60 days of midnight sun per year. Because of the flat terrain, which is only broken by a few hills, it is easy to get lost in the park; lakes and creeks are the easiest means of orientation. The tallest point is Kolfjellet, 260 meters (850 ft) above mean sea level (AMSL).

About twenty percent of the national park is covered by lakes. The entire park is drained through two tributaries of the Pasvikelva, one draining Ellenvatnet and one draining Ødevatnet. Ellenvatnet is the largest lake; located centrally in the park, it is drained from the north. It has two enclosed bays to the south, Parvatn and Skinnposevatn. Ødevatnet, located in the southeast, is the second-largest lake. Many of the smaller lakes are being filled with peat, a process which began following the end of the last glacial period. Many of the bogs have previously been lakes but have been transformed over the years.

The rock composition is mostly granite gneisses, although the northern part of the park has some schist. The entire area is covered by large amounts of soil, and bedrock can only be seen in cliffs and hillocks. These geological conditions result in poor soil quality. During the last glacial period the region was covered by a large glacier which had little movement because of the flat terrain. Thus, the glacier did not create any moraines, which could have created larger lakes. Most lakes are created by variations in the bedrock; Ødevannet is a notable exception as is lies in a deep fault, giving it a long and narrow profile. The fault continues northeastwards, creating the Revsaksskaret cliff. The valley has a marine border at 110 meters (360 ft) AMSL, with the post-glacial rebound having dried up the land about 5000 BC. Prior to this the valley was part of a fjord. The landscape is occasionally interrupted with vegetation-less and flat screes.

The parking place at the national park is the point in mainland Norway farthest by road from Norway's capital Oslo. It is 2,465 kilometres (1,532 mi) by a route entirely within Norway. If international routes are included, Gamvik would be the farthest place from Oslo (2,040 kilometres (1,270 mi)).

== History ==
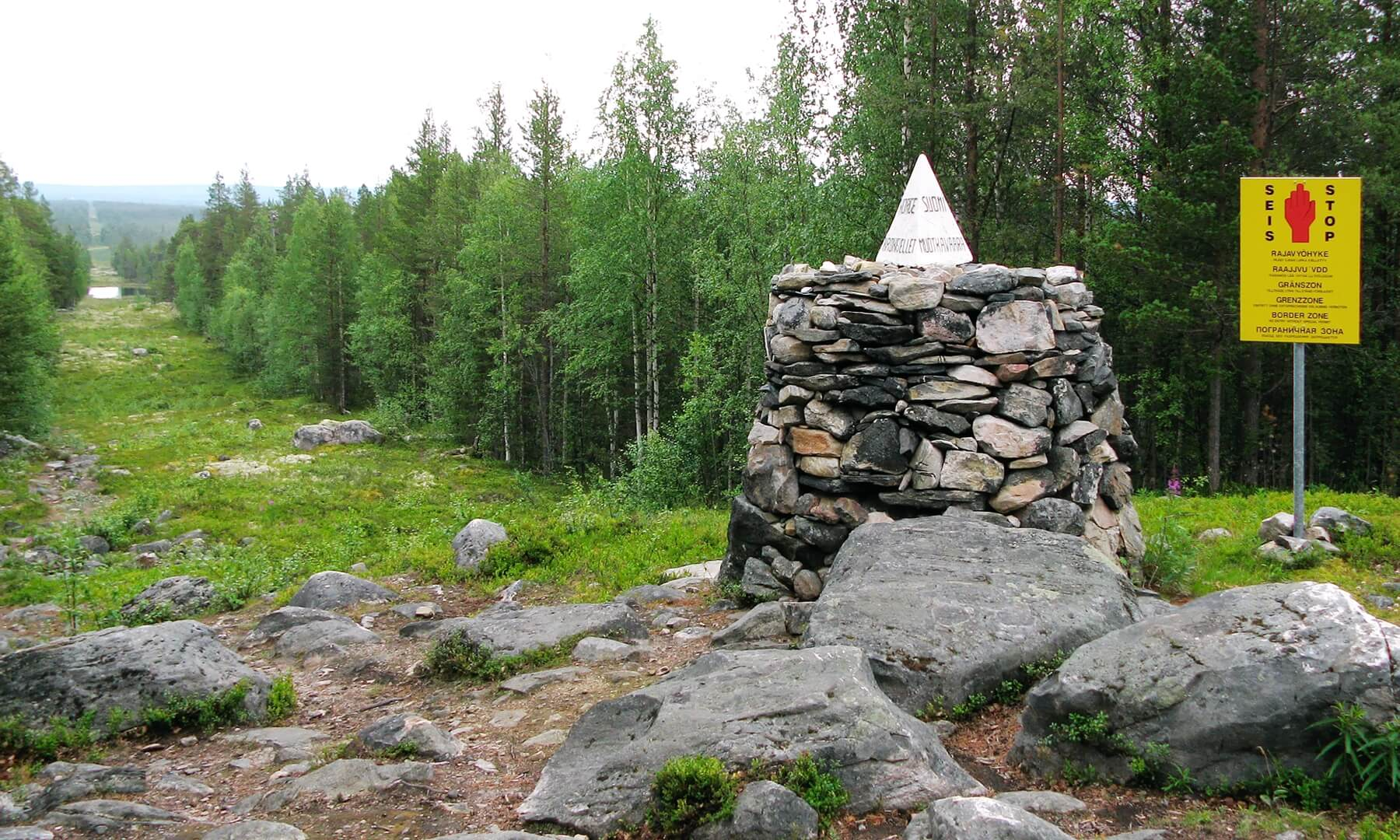
Treriksrøysa, the tripoint cairn located at the intersection of the Finland–Norway–Russia border, is located at the national park border at Muotkavaara.

Pasvikdalen has been populated since the Stone Age; archeological findings from the Komsa culture have been dated back to 4000 BC. About 2300 BC there was immigration from Finland and later the area was largely used by Skolts for reindeer husbandry. Norwegian immigration started about 1850, and the first land was granted land for farming in 1874, after a road was built along the valley to Svanvatn. This was followed up by Russian immigration to the other side of the border. The road was extended to Grensefossen in 1939 and after 1945 the population on the Russian side was forcefully moved by the Soviet authorities and the area depopulated. The Soviet Union started planning to regulate Pasvikelva for hydroelectricity in the 1940s, with the first power station opening in 1951. Seven power stations were built which take advantage of the entire height of fall in the river.

Proposals for a national park was first launched by author Carl Schøyen in 1936, who sent the proposal to the Ministry of Agriculture. The ministry halted the process as at the time they were principally opposed to all forms of conservation; they wanted all natural resources to be exploited. Schøyen raised the proposal again in the late 1940s; in 1951, the year of Schøyen's death, the Director of Forestry decided to administratively protect 70 square kilometers (27 sq mi) of land within the current national park. The plans for a national park were revitalized in the late 1960s with the proposal to build a highway up Pasvikdalen to Ivalo, Finland. However, the road plans were never accepted politically. The national park was established on 6 February 1970 and originally covered an area of 66 square kilometers (25 sq mi).

The national park center opened in 2001 and the park was expanded on 23 August 2003. At the same time the adjacent Øvre Pasvik Landscape Protection Area was created, which borders Pasvik Nature Reserve. Thus the five protected areas were connected. Since 2011 a local political board has been responsible for the management of the park.

== Management ==
The park is managed by the National Park Board for Øvre Pasvik, a local politically nominated body which has the management responsibility for the park, along with the landscape protection area. The board is formally appointed by the Ministry of Environment. It consists of two members nominated by Sør-Varanger Municipal Council, one member from Finnmark County Council, and one member from the Sami Parliament. The park is under the supervision of the Kirkenes office of the Norwegian Nature Inspectorate, a division of the Norwegian Directorate for Nature Management.

== Flora ==
Pasvik is dominated by the old-growth Scots pine, which covers half the park's area. This is the largest remaining area of forest in Norway which has had no significant impact from human development, remaining mostly undisturbed for thousands of years. The forest has a very slow life cycle. The age of a typical tree is between 300 and 400 year; the oldest recorded tree was 820 years when chopped down in 1896. Regrowth is slow because the trees need two consecutive years to produce cones and young trees often die after their buds are eaten by moose during winter. The park has been stricken regularly by wildfires—the latest major fire occurring in 1945. Wildfires normally spread and burn in the undergrowth; as pine trees do not have low-laying branches, older pines will not be effected while younger trees will be consumed by the fire. A forest fire can kill tens of generations of trees, but the remaining ashes give good conditions for young trees, giving an uneven age distribution of pine. None of the islands in the lake of Ellensvatn have had fires, giving it a unique forest composition.

In neighboring areas of Russia there are significant numbers of Norway spruce, but they only exist sporadically within Øvre Pasvik, with no more than 40 trees in one place. The lack of spruce is caused by a combination of frost occurring as late as June, and wildfire. There is also a limited amount of birch, specifically dwarf birch and silver birch. Aspen is uncommon largely because its bark and roots are popular food for animals. Along some creeks there are bird cherry and grey alder. The area is too dry to allow the latter to grow away from creeks and lake sides. There are eight to ten species of willow within the national park.

About 190 species of flowering plants in the park have been registered, most of which are part of the natural composition of the Siberian taiga. Marsh Labrador tea is the most common, the park being one of only three locations in Norway where it occurs. The most common berry plant is lingonberry; common bilberry and bog bilberry are also common, but do not carry good yields of berries. In August there is normally a good yield of cloudberry, and occasionally there can be found Arctic raspberry. There is a limited number of marine plants. The steep cliffs at Revsaksskaret allow mountainous plants to thrive, such as Alpine chickweed, white bluegrass and brittle bladder-fern. These were common throughout the area after the last glacial period, but have vanished with forestation. Other mountainous plants common in the region are not found in Pasvik because of low oxygen levels in the lower soil levels.

== Fauna ==
The brown bear hibernates in the park, and two to four females have cubs in the park and the landscape protection area each year. Bears can also be found in transit between Russia and Finland. Other common mammals include red fox, stoat, least weasel, American mink and European pine marten. The population of moose has been increasing; its wear on the tree population affects the regrowth of trees. Norway lemming and wood lemming are uncommon; Eurasian lynx sometimes cross through the park. Pasvik is one of very few areas in Norway where Laxmann's shrew is found. Reindeer husbandry is permitted within the park, although the area is mostly used during the winter as the herds are moved out to Varangerfjorden for the summers. Raccoon dog is an introduced species to Europe and was first spotted in the national park area in 1983.

There are eight species of fish in the park: Northern pike and European perch are the most common, others include grayling, common minnow, burbot, three-spined stickleback and the least common, brown trout. The trout came up Pasvikelven about 8000 BC. The other species arrived after the last glacial period from Lake Inari and ultimately from the then freshwater Baltic Sea.

The bird life is dominated by species from the Siberian taiga, which are otherwise not common in Norway. Species inhabiting the park include Siberian jay, pine grosbeak, Bohemian waxwing, common crane and whooper swan. Several species of sparrow and charadriiformes are also common. There are also three species of Falconiformes—rough-legged buzzard, merlin and osprey, the latter which can be seen hunting over Ellenvatnet and Ødevatnet. The great grey owl and northern hawk-owl are common in years with good access to rodents.

== Recreation ==
Location of Øvre Pasvik (no. 36) within Metropolitan Norway

No recreational facilities exist in the park, nor has the park been modified in any way to accommodate recreation. There is a national park center co-located with NIBIO Svanhovd, located at Svanvik, 40 kilometers (25 mi) south of Kirkenes. In addition to information for hikers, the center has a display and shows films from the national park and its nature, culture and history. Øvre Pasvik is located 90 kilometers (56 mi) south of Kirkenes. The park is accessible by car at three points from three side roads of National Road 885; the one terminates at the national park border near Svartbrysttjern, the other at Ødevatnskoia close to Ødevatnet, and the third runs through the landscape protection area and terminates at Grensefoss, ca. 5 kilometers (3 mi) from the tripoint cairn.

The park reflects the fact that it is located in the border area with Russia. It involves some traffic of military personnel in the area and information about precautions one must observe in that regard. There are no marked trails in the park. GPS is recommended as hiking equipment in the flat terrain, where there are few visible orientation marks. From Grensefoss there is a wide path between the Russian border and national border up to Treriksrøysa, which marks the boundary with Finland and Russia.

All motorized vehicles are prohibited, but it is permitted to bring canoes and other non-motorized boats, as well as skiing during winter. Walking and tenting is permitted everywhere. Berries and mushrooms can be harvested for personal use. Hunting and fishing is also permitted with a hunting or fishing license. Dogs may be brought along, but must be in a leash between 1 April and 20 August. Hikers must show special consideration regarding vegetation, animal life and cultural heritage.
