= Svanvik, Finnmark =

Svanvik, Finnmark: Svanvik (Norwegian); Jouttenlahti (Kven)
- Village
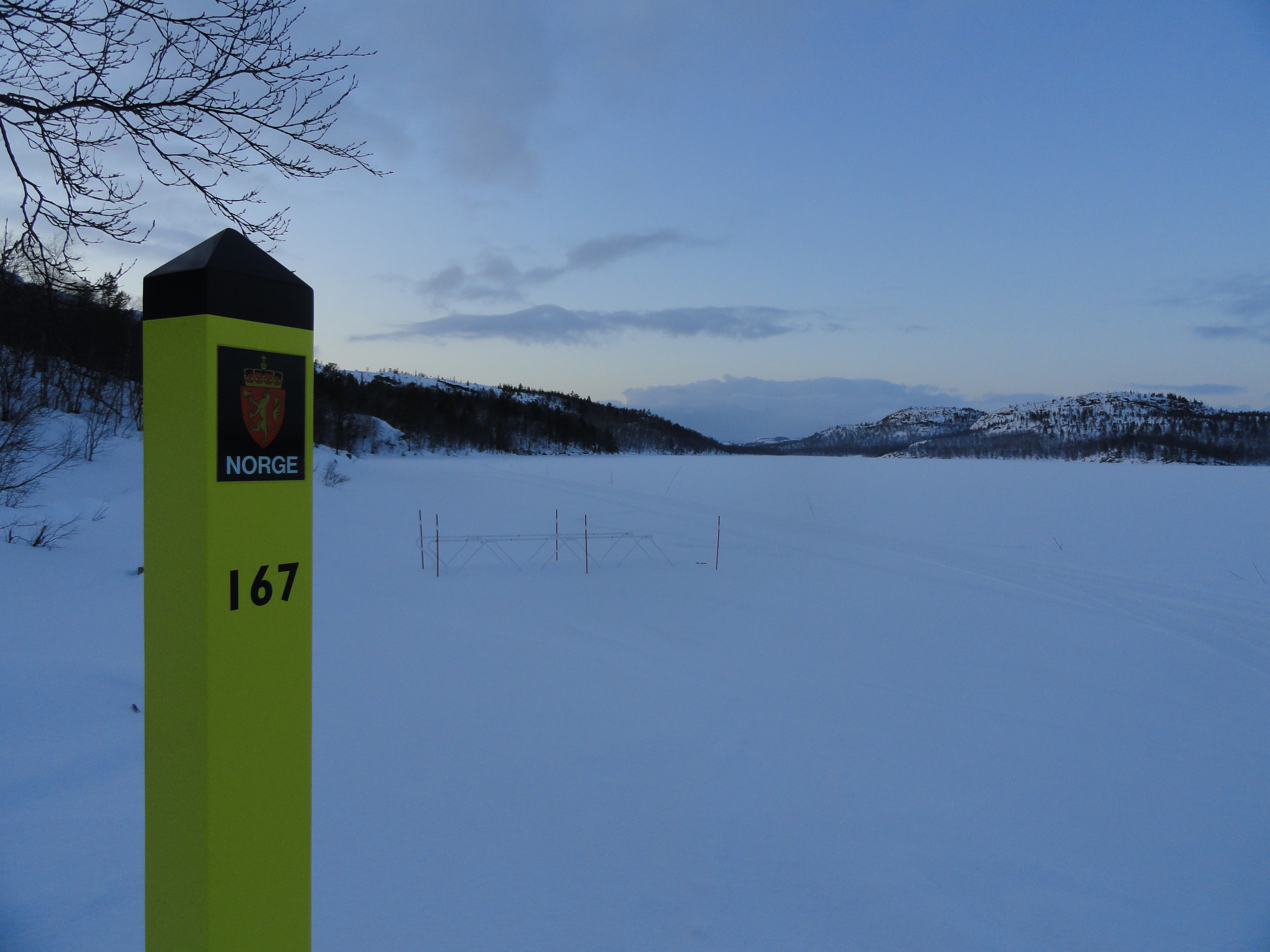
- Boundary marker 167 north in Svanvik's area of responsibility
- Interactive map of Svanvik, Finnmark
- Location within Finnmark Location within Norway
- Coordinates: 69°27′10″N 30°03′17″E
- Country: Norway
- Region: Northern Norway
- County: Finnmark
- District: Øst-Finnmark
- Municipality: Sør-Varanger Municipality
- Elevation: 24 m (79 ft)
- Time zone: UTC+01:00 (CET)
  - Summer (DST): UTC+02:00 (CEST)
- Post Code: 9925 Svanvik

Svanvik (Kven: Jouttenlahti or Svanviikki) is a village in Sør-Varanger Municipality in Finnmark county, Norway. It is located 40 km (25 mi) south of the town of Kirkenes and its on the north bank of Svanevatn, a lake in the Paatsjoki river basin. The village had a population of 250 in 2019.

Svanvik Church, Pasvik Folk College, and Øvre Pasvik National Park are located in Svanvik. Svanvik has its own primary and secondary school, Pasvik School. The school is located approximately 2–3 kilometres (1.2–1.9 mi) north of Pasviktunet.

== Svanvik border station ==
Svanvik has one of the border guard stations on the Norway–Russia border, but it is not a border crossing station. From Svanvik, they keep an eye on, among other things, the Russian mining town of Nikel, which is only 9 km (5.6 mi) from Svanvik (but 84 km (52 mi) by car). Like Skogfoss and Gjøkåsen, Svanvik is located by the Paatsjoki river. The station bears the name of the village in which it is located and is part of the community.

== Climate ==
Climate data for Pasvik - Svanvik 1991–2020 (27 m, avg high/low 2009-2025, extremes 1957–2024)
Month	Jan	Feb	Mar	Apr	May	Jun	Jul	Aug	Sep	Oct	Nov	Dec	Year
Mean daily maximum °C (°F)	−8.1 (17.4)	−6.4 (20.5)	−1.3 (29.7)	4 (39)	10.1 (50.2)	15.4 (59.7)	19.3 (66.7)	17.1 (62.8)	12.1 (53.8)	4 (39)	−1.8 (28.8)	−5.3 (22.5)	4.9 (40.8)
Daily mean °C (°F)	−12.4 (9.7)	−11.4 (11.5)	−6.6 (20.1)	−0.8 (30.6)	4.6 (40.3)	9.7 (49.5)	13.5 (56.3)	11.7 (53.1)	7.3 (45.1)	1 (34)	−5 (23)	−9.2 (15.4)	0.2 (32.4)
Mean daily minimum °C (°F)	−17.6 (0.3)	−15.1 (4.8)	−11.9 (10.6)	−4.8 (23.4)	1.2 (34.2)	5.9 (42.6)	9.4 (48.9)	7.8 (46.0)	4.3 (39.7)	−1.3 (29.7)	−7.9 (17.8)	−14 (7)	−3.7 (25.4)
Average precipitation mm (inches)	28 (1.1)	21 (0.8)	31 (1.2)	30 (1.2)	37 (1.5)	67 (2.6)	69 (2.7)	69 (2.7)	43 (1.7)	43 (1.7)	25 (1.0)	30 (1.2)	493 (19.4)
Source 1: yr.no
Source 2: Seklima (avg high/lows)
