= Svanvik Church =

- Svanvik kirke
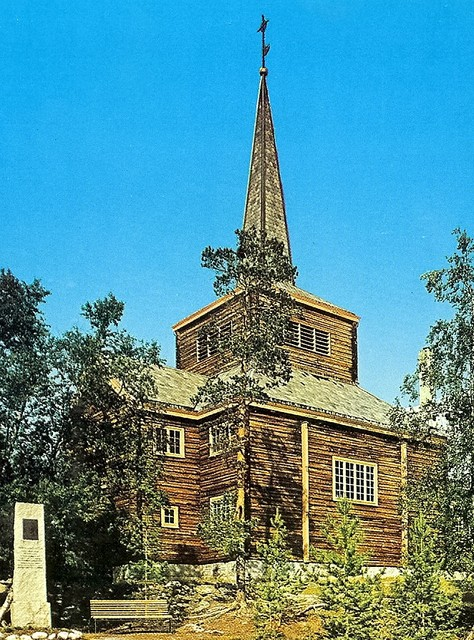
- View of the church
- Svanvik Church
- 69.45305°N 30.05416°E
- Location: Sør-Varanger, Finnmark
- Country: Norway
- Denomination: Church of Norway
- Churchmanship: Evangelical Lutheran

History
- Former name: Svanvik kapell
- Status: Parish church
- Founded: 1934
- Consecrated: 5 Sept 1934

Architecture
- Functional status: Active
- Architect: Harald Sund
- Architectural type: Cruciform church
- Completed: 1934 (92 years ago)

Specifications
- Capacity: 250
- Materials: Wood

Administration
- Diocese: Nord-Hålogaland
- Deanery: Varanger prosti
- Parish: Sør-Varanger
- Norwegian Cultural Heritage Site
- Type: Church
- Status: Listed
- ID: 85008

Svanvik Church (Norwegian: Svanvik kirke) is a parish church of the Church of Norway in Sør-Varanger Municipality in Finnmark county, Norway. It is located in the village of Svanvik in the Pasvikdalen valley, along the river Pasvikelva, right on the border with Russia. It is one of the churches for the Sør-Varanger parish which is part of the Varanger prosti (deanery) in the Diocese of Nord-Hålogaland. The wooden church was built in a cruciform style in 1934 by the architect Harald Sund. The church seats about 250 people.

The building was consecrated on 5 September 1934 after a long time when the people of the Pasvikdalen valley wanted their own place of worship. During World War II, the chapel was located right in the firing line during the Liberation of Finnmark, but it received only minor damage and it was quickly repaired after the war.

== See also ==
- List of churches in Nord-Hålogaland
