= Pasvik =

Village in Sør-Varanger, Norway

Pasvik / Pasvikdalen: Paaččjokk (Skolt Sami); Báhčaveajji (Northern Sami); Paatsjoki (Kven)
- Village
- Interactive map of Pasvik / Pasvikdalen
- Location within Finnmark Location within Norway
- Coordinates: 69.32919°N 29.33184°E
- Country: Norway
- Region: Northern Norway
- County: Finnmark
- District: Øst-Finnmark
- Municipality: Sør-Varanger Municipality
- Elevation: 55 m (180 ft)
- Time zone: UTC+01:00 (CET)
  - Summer (DST): UTC+02:00 (CEST)
- Post Code: 9900 Kirkenes

Pasvik or Pasvikdalen (also: Paaččjokk (Skolt Sami), Báhčaveajji (Northern Sami), or Paatsjoki (Kven)) is a rural village area in the Pasvikdalen valley in Northern Norway adjacent to the Norway-Russia border. The settlements of the village area are all located along the Pasvikelva river.

== See also ==
- Øvre Pasvik National Park, located near the village area
