= Muotkavaara =

Hill at the tripoint between Finland, Norway and Russia

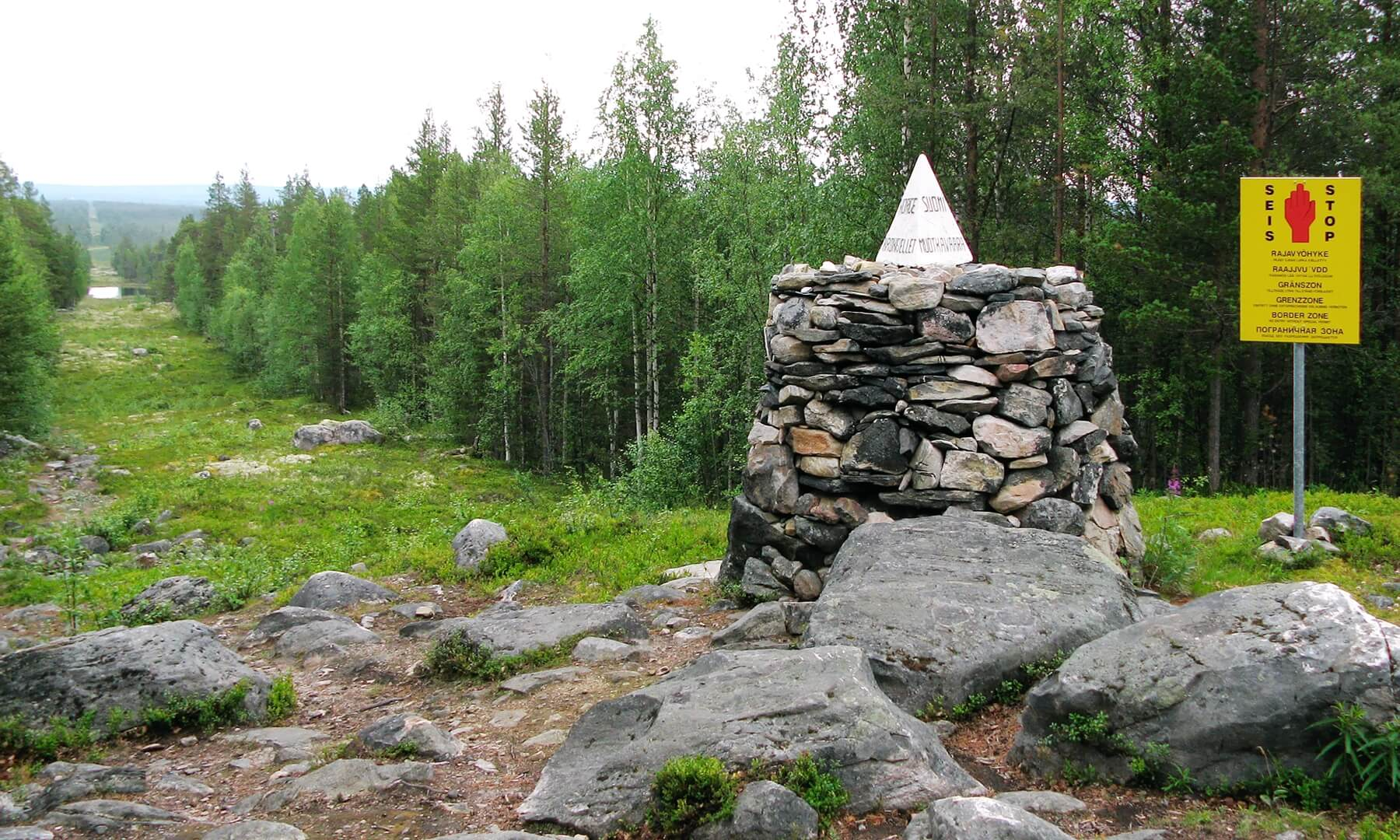
- The cairn on the boundary between Finland, Norway and Russia

- Location within Scandinavia

Muotkavaara (Finnish), Krokfjell (Norwegian), Муоткавара or Муоткаваара (Russian), Muotkevárri (Northern Sami), or Myetkivääri (Inari Sami) is a hill in Lapland at the boundary between Finland, Norway, and Russia. It is the second northernmost international tripoint in the world; the tripoint of Finland, Norway and Sweden is 900 metres (3,000 ft) further to the north.

Muotkavaara is located in the Pasvikdalen valley, west of the Pasvikelva river and 15 km (9 mi) southwest of Nyrud just west of Krokfjellet in Sør-Varanger Municipality in Finnmark county, Norway. The Finnish side belongs to the Inari Municipality, the Norwegian side belongs to Sør-Varanger Municipality, and the Russian side belongs to Nikel Municipality. The 169-metre (554 ft) peak is located in Norway.

The site is also notable as a time zone tripoint: Norway uses UTC+1, Finland UTC+2, and Russia UTC+3. However, this distinction applies only in winter, since in summer both Finland and Russia observe UTC+3 while Norway observes UTC+2.

The Sami name (muotke, myetki) refers to an isthmus between waters.

== History of the tripoint ==
Most of the present-day Finland–Norway border was established by the 1751 Treaty of Strömstad between Sweden and Norway. That treaty, however, defined the boundary only as far east as Kolmisoaivi. The area around Muotkavaara remained part of the fellesdistrikt (shared district) jointly administered by Norway and Russia.

Following Finland's incorporation into the Russian Empire as the autonomous Grand Duchy of Finland in 1809, and Norway's personal union with Sweden in 1814, the political situation in northern Fennoscandia changed significantly. This created the need to define the remaining undefined stretches of border. In 1826, Norway–Sweden and Russia negotiated a new border treaty. It confirmed the existing 1751 boundary as the line between Norway and the Russian Empire, and also established the easternmost section of the border from Kolmisoaivi to the Arctic Ocean.

In 1833, the northern part of the Finland–Russia border was drawn, connecting to the Norwegian border at Mutkavaara (Muotkavaara). At this time, this was an internal border within the Russian Empire. In 1846, a rock cairn was erected at the tripoint (69°03.115′N 28°55.758′E), during a complete survey of the border between Norway and the Russian Empire. Five other cairns were also built between Muotkavaara and Kolmisoaivi.

Finland declared independence in 1917. Between 1920 and 1944, when Petsamo was part of Finland, the tripoint ceased to exist, as Norway and Russia no longer shared a border. Muotkavaara regained its status as a tripoint in 1944, when Finland ceded Petsamo to the Soviet Union in the Moscow Armistice. A concrete tetrahedron was added on the top of the cairn in 1945. The border was further modified in 1947 when Finland sold the Jäniskoski-Niskakoski region to the Soviet Union. Since then, the border between Finland and Soviet Union (now Russia) is oriented to the south-west from the Muotkavaara tripoint.

== Outdooring ==
The Norwegian side of Muotkavaara is part of Øvre Pasvik National Park. The Finnish side is slightly outside the Vätsäri Wilderness Area. There is a joint name for the contiguous natural reserve area: Pasvik–Inari Trilateral Park.

The tripoint can legally be approached only from the Norwegian side, as both Finland and Russia maintain extensive border security zones with restricted public access. The tripoint is most easily reached from Grensefoss, around a 5-kilometre (3.1 mi) hike each way.

== See also ==
- Finnish–Russian border
- Finland–Norway border
- Norway–Russia border
