= Fjørvatnet =

Lake in Norway and Russia

- Location within Scandinavia
- Location: Pasvik Nature Reserve - Sør-Varanger Municipality, Norway and Murmansk Oblast, Russia
- Coordinates: 69.1689°N 29.2791°E
- Basin countries: Norway and Russia

Fjørvatnet (Norwegian), Höyhenjärvi (Kven), Pâʹjj-jeänjäuʹrr (Skolt Sami), or Хеюхенъярви (Russian) is a lake along the Norway-Russia border in the Pasvikdalen valley. It is in Sør-Varanger Municipality in Finnmark county, Norway and in Murmansk Oblast, Russia. It is the core part of the a joint Norwegian and Russian Pasvik Nature Reserve.
