= Ellenvatnet =

Lake in Sør-Varanger, Norway

Ellenvatnet (Norwegian); Ealjejávri (Northern Sami); Ellijärvi (Kven)
- The location of Ellenvatnet within Øvre Pasvik National Park
- Interactive map of the lake
- Location: Sør-Varanger Municipality, Finnmark
- Coordinates: 69.1200°N 28.90°E
- Basin countries: Norway
- Max. length: 7 kilometres (4.3 mi)
- Max. width: 3 kilometres (1.9 mi)
- Surface area: 10.93 km^{2} (4.22 sq mi)
- Surface elevation: 120 metres (390 ft)
- References: NVE

Ellenvatnet (Norwegian), Ealjejávri (Northern Sami), or Ellijärvi (Kven) is a lake located Sør-Varanger Municipality in Finnmark county, Norway. The lake has an area of 10.93-square-kilometre (4.22 sq mi).

The lake is located within Øvre Pasvik National Park, just northwest of the lake Ødevatnet. Ellenvatnet is the park's largest lake, located centrally in the park and is drained from the north through the river Ellenelva. Ellenvatnet is shallow and has a long and crooked shoreline with a large number of small islands. It has two enclosed bays to the south, Parvatn and Skinnposevatn. From Parvatnet a short river leads up to Grenseparvatnet (Kertusjärvi) at the border with Finland.

== See also ==
- List of lakes in Norway
