= Borders of Norway =

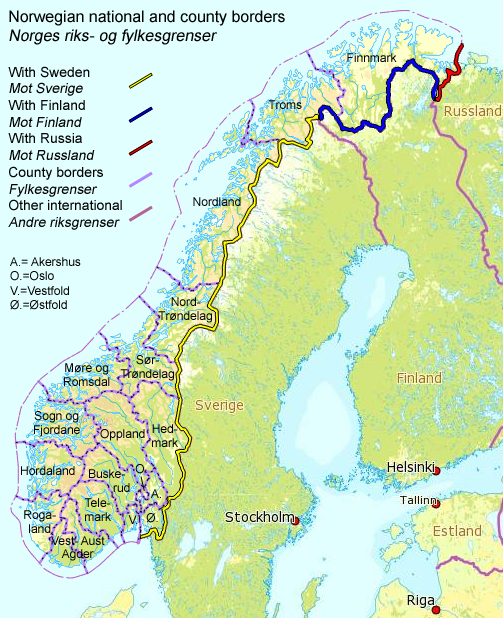
Norway's national borders Norway-Sweden border Norway-Finland border Norway-Russia border

Borders of Norway may refer to:

- The Finland–Norway border
- The Norway–Russia border
- The Norway–Sweden border
