= Hans Schaanning =

Norwegian ornithologist

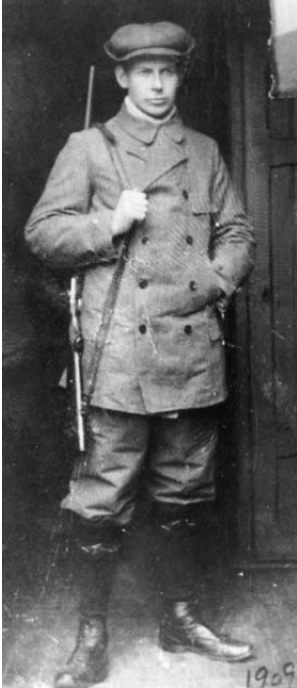
Schaanning in 1909

Hans Thomas Lange Schaanning (2 March 1878 – 5 March 1956) was a Norwegian zoologist and ornithologist who studied the birds on the border of Norway and Russia. He later served as curator of birds in the museum at Stavanger.

Schaanning was born in Oslo to Agnes Helene Salvesen (1849–1934) and engineer Peder Schaanning (1843–98). Schaaning was interested in birds even at a young age and was tutored at home by several teachers including Kristine Bonnevie. He passed the artium exam in 1899. He joined the University of Kristiania but did not enjoy studying zoology under Robert Collett and preferred the outdoors. He received a scholarship to travel to Pasvik in 1900 where he helped collect skins and eggs along. In 1902 he married the sixteen-year-old daughter of his Finnish neighbour Elsa Fiina Rautiola and lived on Varlam Island in a place called Noatun. He travelled on an expedition headed by Kristian Birkeland with Johan Koren into Novaya Zemlya in winter. In 1907 he published on the birds of the Eastern Finnmark. Elsa died in 1907 at the age of 21, leaving him with three children. He then moved married Hedevig Lysholm Schjelderup in 1909. In 1918 he became a curator at the Stavanger Museum. In 1920 he founded the first ornithological society and in 1921, the first ornithological journal Norsk ornithologisk tidsskrift. He retired in 1948 to Kragerø.
