= Pasvik–Inari Trilateral Park =

Wilderness area in Finland, Norway and Russia

Pasvik–Inari Trilateral Park is a contiguous protected wilderness area spanning Finland, Norway and Russia. It consists of the Vätsäri Wilderness Area in Finland, Øvre Pasvik National Park and Øvre Pasvik Landscape Protection Area in Norway and the joint Norwegian–Russian Pasvik Nature Reserve.

Pasvik–Inari Trilateral Park was established in several steps: Øvre Pasvik National Park was created in 1970, the Russian part of Pasvik Nature Reserve was established in 1992, and the Norwegian part created the following year. The twelve wilderness areas of Finland in Lapland were all created in 1991 to protect both the natural wilderness and the Sami culture. These areas combined cover an area of 14,903 square kilometers (5,754 sq mi), where such activities as road construction and mining are prohibited, as is logging in some areas. In 2003 the national park was expanded and Øvre Pasvik Landscape Protection Area was established, connecting the Finnish and Russian preserves into a contiguous protected area spanning three countries.
