= Ødevatnet =

Lake in Sør-Varanger, Norway

Ødevatnet (Norwegian); Evettijärvi (Kven)
- Ávvedanjávri or Ávdinjávri (Northern Sami)
- Interactive map of the lake
- Location: Sør-Varanger Municipality, Finnmark
- Coordinates: 69.0646°N 28.9897°E
- Basin countries: Norway
- Max. length: 4 kilometres (2.5 mi)
- Max. width: 1 kilometre (0.62 mi)
- Surface area: 2.83 km^{2} (1.09 sq mi)
- Shore length^{1}: 11.4 kilometres (7.1 mi)
- Surface elevation: 88 metres (289 ft)
- References: NVE
- ^{1} Shore length is not a well-defined measure.

Ødevatnet (Norwegian) or Evettijärvi (Kven) is a lake located in Sør-Varanger Municipality in Finnmark county, Norway. The 2.83-square-kilometre (1.09 sq mi) lake lies entirely within Øvre Pasvik National Park, to the southeast of the large lake Ellenvatnet. Unlike some other lakes in the area, it lies in a deep fault, giving it a long and narrow profile. The fault continues northeastwards, creating the Revsaksskaret cliff.

== See also ==
- List of lakes in Norway
