= Carl Schøyen =

Norwegian writer

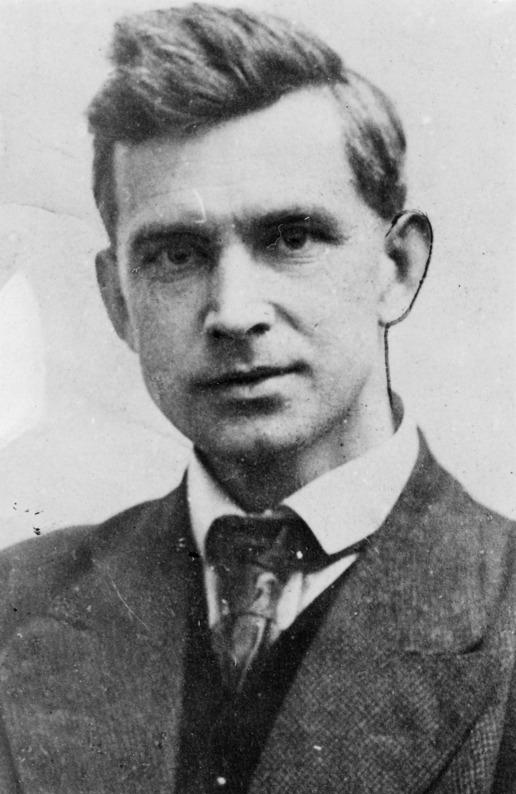
Carl Schøyen, c. 1930.

Carl Schøyen (6 July 1877 – 5 March 1951) was a Norwegian poet and non-fiction writer. He was born in Kristiansand, and his family later moved to Kristiania. A summer with his uncle at Skomvær Lighthouse at Røst was influential for his later literary career. He made his literary debut in 1895 with the poetry collection Melodier. Among his other books are Tre stammers møte from 1918, and I Sameland from 1924. He argued for the preservation of nature, including protection of the common eider and eagles, and of the forests of Pasvikdalen. He was decorated Knight, First Class of the Order of St. Olav in 1948.
