= Paatsjoki River Hydroelectric Plants =

Hydroelectric power stations in northern Europe

The Paatsjoki River hydroelectric power plants are a series of hydroelectric installations on the Paatsjoki River.

== Description ==
The Paatsjoki River flows from Lake Inari in Finland and for most of its duration, it marks the border between Russia and Norway. On the river there are several Norwegian and Russian hydroelectric stations. The operations of the stations is governed by several international agreements (Agreement between the Soviet Union and Norway on 18 December 1957 about the usage of hydroelectric installations on the Paatsjoki River, Agreement from 29.04.59 about regulating the control of Lake Inari concerning hydroelectric installations and the Kaitakoski Dam between the Soviet Union, Finland, and Norway.) About 85% of the electricity produced by the series of Russian hydroelectric stations is exported abroad. The hydroelectric system operates automatically.

The Russian hydroelectric installations belong to Territorial Generating Company № 1, based in Saint-Petersburg, Russia.

Hydroelectric stations Kaitakoski (Russia), Jäniskoski (Russia), Rajakoski (Russia), Hevoskoski (Russia), Skogfoss (Norway), Melkefoss (Norway), Borisoglebskaya (Russia) form the series of hydroelectric installations on the river.

In total, all the hydroelectric stations have a power of 275.9 Megawatts, and produce 1475 GWh per year.

The list is in downstream order, from Lake Inari to the Barents Sea.

== Kaitakoski hydroelectric station ==
The Kaitakoski hydroelectric station (Russian: Кайтакоски ГЭС (ГЭС-4)) in Russia on the Paatsjoki River (68°56′19″N 28°36′02″E) began operation in 1959. The power station is owned and operated by TGC-1 power company. At the uppermost three stations, the river is entirely in Russia.

== Jäniskoski hydroelectric station ==
The Jäniskoski hydroelectric station (Russian: Янискоски ГЭС (ГЭС-5)) (68°58′18″N 28°46′49″E) was constructed from 1938 to 1942, at that time on Finnish territory. Because Finland ceded territory to the USSR after the Continuation War, the power station is now on Russian territory. The power station was created to provide electrical energy for nickel mining in Petsamo. The power station was destroyed during World War II in 1944. After the war, the power station was rebuilt by Finnish firm Imatran Voima (today Fortum) on a contract with the USSR, and reentered operation in 1950. The power station is owned and operated by TGC-1 power company.

== Rajakoski hydroelectric station ==
Beginning operation on 25 May 1956, the Rajakoski hydroelectric station (Russian: Раякоски ГЭС (ГЭС-6)) is a Russian hydroelectric station on the Paatsjoki River (69°01′22″N 29°00′20″E). The station was built by Finnish firm Imatran Voima on a contract with the USSR. The power station is owned and operated by TGC-1 power company. It is located around 500 metres (1,600 ft) from the border to Norway and 4 kilometres (2.5 mi) south-east from the border tripoint at Muotkavaara.

== Hevoskoski hydroelectric station ==
The Hevoskoski hydroelectric station (Russian: Хевоскоски ГЭС (ГЭС-7), Norwegian: Hestefoss kraftverk) on the Paatsjoki River (69°07′03″N 29°14′31″E), was built between 1956 and 1970. The border goes in the river here, but the hydroelectric station is located on Russian territory. The power station is owned and operated by TGC-1 power company.

== Skogfoss hydroelectric station ==
The Skogfoss hydroelectric station on the Paatsjoki River is a Norwegian hydroelectric station built in 1964. The border is in the river, but the station is on the Norwegian side (69°22′22″N 29°41′38″E).

== Melkefoss hydroelectric station ==
The Melkefoss hydroelectric station, built in 1978, is a Norwegian hydroelectric station on the Paatsjoki River. The border is in the river, but the station is on the Norwegian side (69°23′57″N 29°47′13″E).

== Borisoglebsky hydroelectric station ==
Built between 1960 and 1964, the Borisoglebsky hydroelectric station (Russian: Борисоглебская ГЭС (ГЭС-8)) on the Paatsjoki River is a Russian hydroelectric station (69°38′37″N 30°8′15″E) built under a water derivation system. The power station is owned and operated by TGC-1 power company. The border is in the river, but the station is on the Russian side. Named after the locality Borisoglebsky, Murmansk Oblast.
