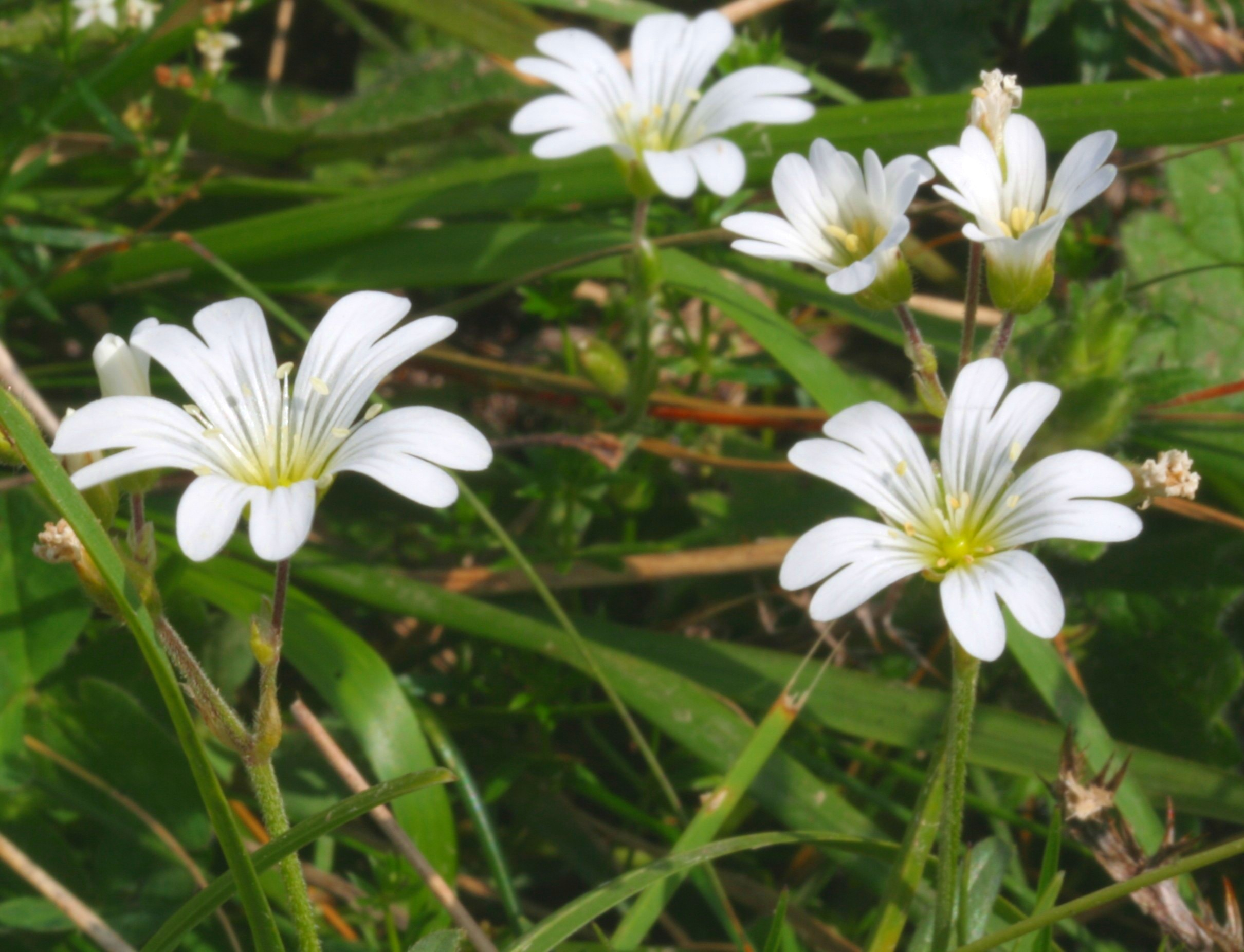

Scientific classification
- Kingdom: Plantae
- Clade: Tracheophytes
- Clade: Angiosperms
- Clade: Eudicots
- Order: Caryophyllales
- Family: Caryophyllaceae
- Genus: Cerastium
- Species: C. alpinum

Binomial name
- Cerastium alpinum L., 1753

= Cerastium alpinum =

Species of flowering plant in the pink family

Cerastium alpinum, commonly called alpine mouse-ear or alpine chickweed, is a mat-forming perennial plant. The species was first described by Carl Linnaeus in 1753. It is native to Greenland, Canada and northern Europe. It is grown as a rock garden subject for its many small white flowers and silver haired stems and foliage. There are three subspecies.
