= Pasvikdalen =

- Долина реки Паз
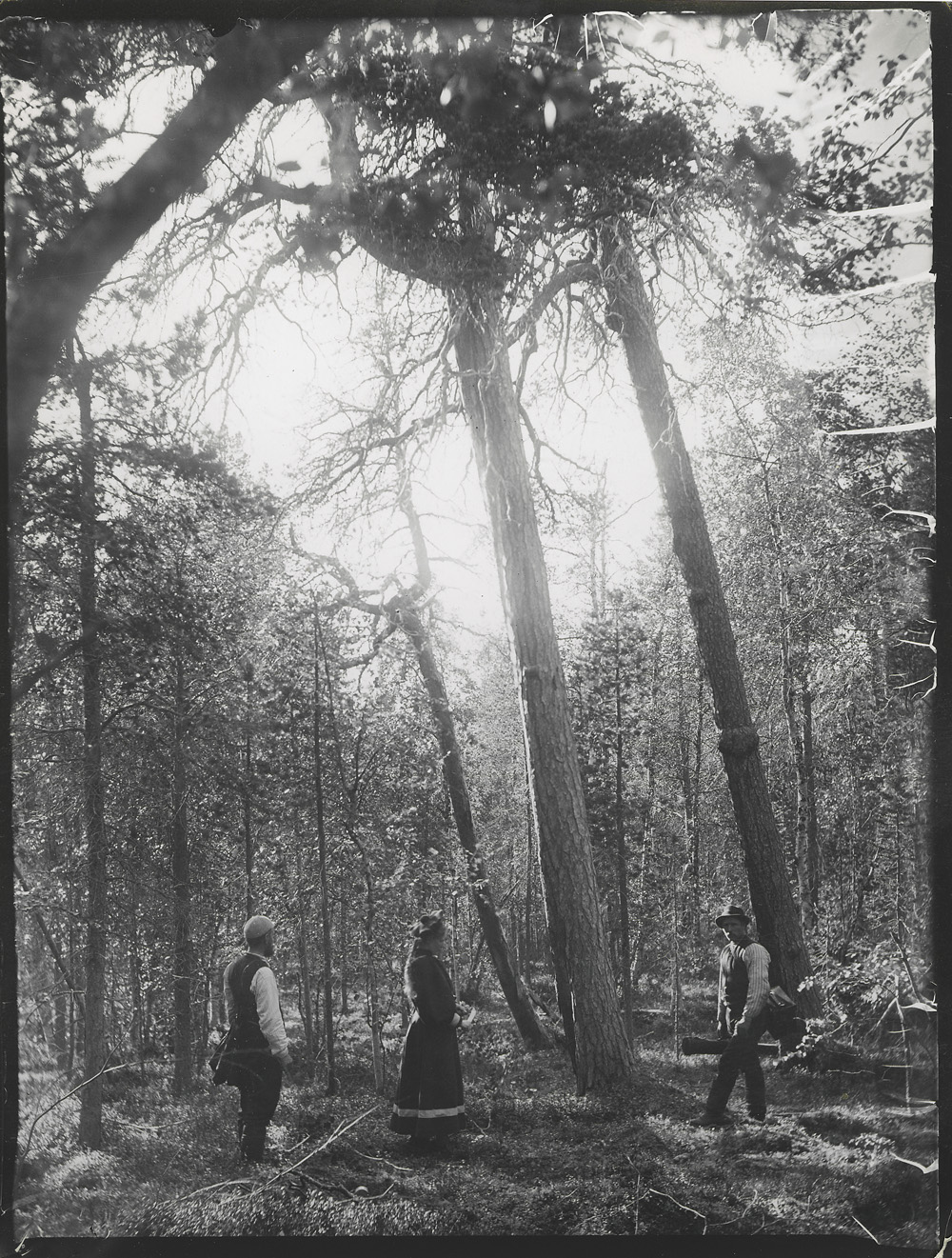
- View of a pine forest in the valley
- Length: 150 kilometres (93 mi) Northeast-Southwest

Geology
- Type: River valley

Geography
- Location: Finnmark, Norway
- Coordinates: 69°20′00″N 29°21′14″E
- Rivers: Pasvikelva river

Location
- Interactive map of the valley

Pasvikdalen (Russian: Долина реки Паз) is a valley in Norway and Russia. The Norwegian side of the valley belongs to Sør-Varanger Municipality in Finnmark county and the Russian side is located in the Pechengsky District in Murmansk Oblast. The valley contains large areas of pine forests, and more than 100 square kilometres (39 sq mi)) of the valley is included inside the Øvre Pasvik National Park in Norway (in the southern part of the valley). The Øvre Pasvik Landscape Protection Area is also located in the valley, outside of the park.

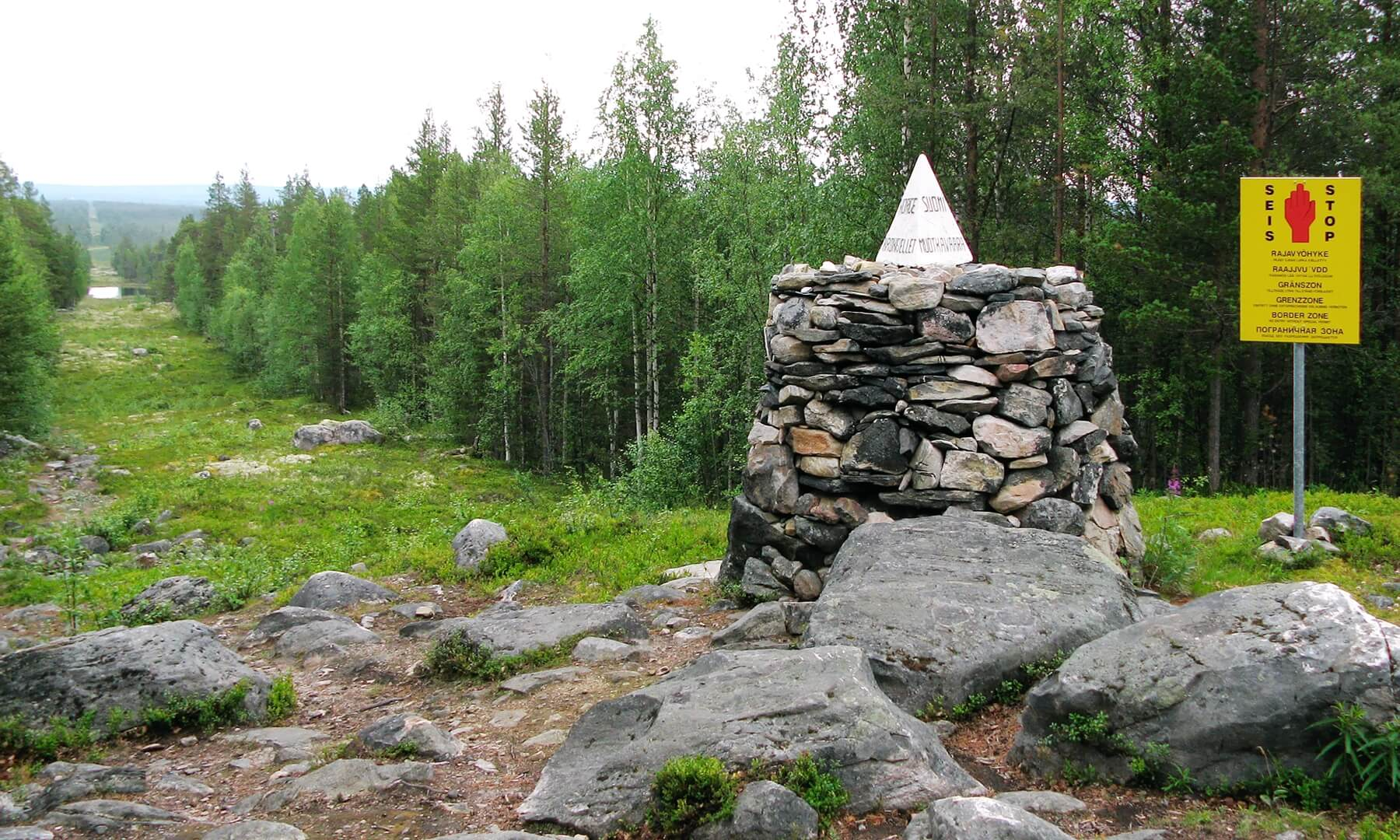
Treriksrøysa marks the intersection of the Norway–Russia border, the Finland–Norway border and the Finland–Russia border.

The valley was traditionally inhabited by Sami people. The river Pasvikelva runs through the valley (giving it the name) and the river defines part of the Norway–Russia border. The southern part of the valley is also the location of the Treriksrøysa, the point where the borders of Norway, Finland, and Russia meet.

== History ==
The middle of the 1930s on the Norwegian side of the valley, was "a time with homesteading and colonization of the valley, as part of a political desire to mark Norwegian sovereignty in the area. To make the valley attractive as a tourist destination, an observation tower was erected at the highest point of the area, 96 meters above sea level. At the top of the tower [on "hill 96"] there was a restaurant run by ["Sør-Varanger tourist association"] Sør-Varanger turistforening".

=== 1968 border incident ===
In the early hours of 7 June 1968, the three soldiers who were at the (Norwegian) border observation tower at ["hill 96"] 96-høyden outside Svanvik (Norway) (no), observed that 14 Soviet tanks simultaneously were pointing their barrels at Norwegian border observation posts when some of the tanks opened fire—apparently with blanks; the staging of tanks near the border was against Soviet—Norwegian treaties, because no advance notification has occurred; along the Soviet-Norwegian border the Soviets mobilized one infantry division supported by paratroopers and warplanes, including 70 T-54 tanks and 400 other vehicles with sights pointed at Norwegian targets.
