= Øvre Pasvik Landscape Protection Area =

Nature reserve in Sør-Varanger municipality, Norway

- Øvre Pasvik landskapsvernområde
- Location within Norway
- Location: Sør-Varanger Municipality, Finnmark, Norway
- Coordinates: 69.080°N 29.114°E
- Area: 54.6 km^{2} (21.1 sq mi)
- Established: 2003

Øvre Pasvik Landscape Protection Area (Norwegian: Øvre Pasvik landskapsvernområde), is located in the Pasvikdalen valley in Sør-Varanger Municipality in Finnmark county, Norway. The landscape protection area was established in 2003, and covers an area of 54.6 km^{2} (21.1 sq mi). At the same time the adjacent Øvre Pasvik National Park was extended from 66 to 119 square kilometres (25 to 46 mi^{2}).
