= Svanevatn =

Lake in Norway and Russia

Svanevatn (Norwegian); Čoalbmejávri (Northern Sami); Salmijärvi (Kven); Сальмиярви (Russian)
- Interactive map of the lake
- Location: Norway–Russia border
- Coordinates: 69.4303°N 30.0417°E
- Basin countries: Norway
- Surface area: 32.51 km^{2} (12.55 sq mi)
- Shore length^{1}: 66.21 kilometres (41.14 mi)
- Surface elevation: 22 metres (72 ft)
- References: NVE
- ^{1} Shore length is not a well-defined measure.

Svanevatn (Norwegian)–lit. 'Swan Lake', Čoalbmejávri (Northern Sami), or Salmijärvi (Kven) is a lake on the border between Norway and Russia. The lake is located in Sør-Varanger Municipality in Finnmark county in Norway and the Pechengsky District of Murmansk Oblast in Russia.

Svanevatn has an area of 32.51 square kilometres (12.55 sq mi), a circumference of 66.21 kilometres (41.14 mi) and a height of 22 metres (72 ft).

== See also ==
- List of lakes in Norway
