= Lake Inari =

Lake in Finland

Lake Inarijärvi
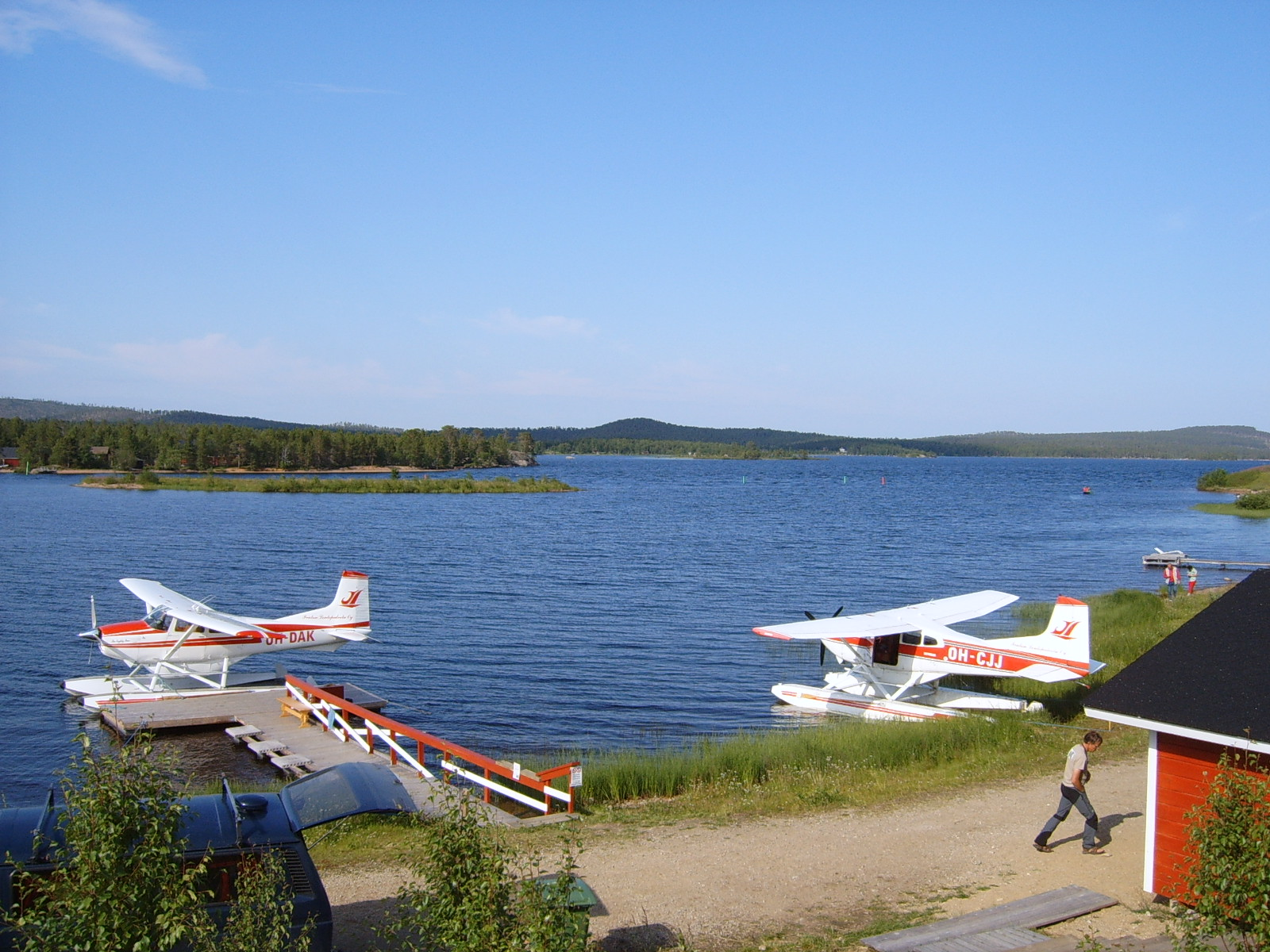
- Lake Inari in July 2005

- Location within Lapland

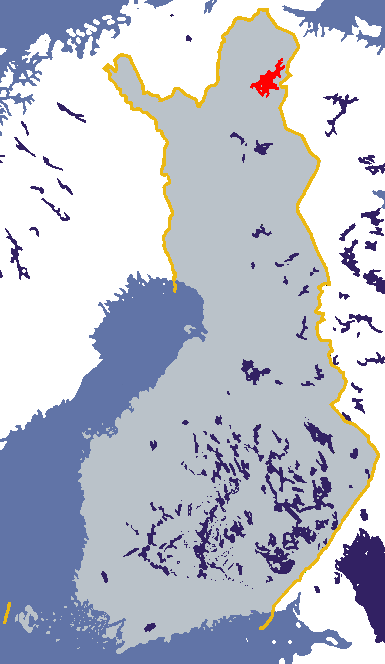
- Location: Inari, Lapland Province
- Coordinates: 69°00′N 28°00′E
- Primary outflows: Paatsjoki
- Basin countries: Finland
- Max. length: 80 km (50 mi)
- Max. width: 50 km (31 mi)
- Surface area: 1,040.28 km^{2} (401.65 sq mi)
- Average depth: 15 m (49 ft)
- Max. depth: 92 m (302 ft)
- Water volume: 15.9 km^{3} (12,900,000 acre⋅ft)
- Shore length^{1}: 3,308 km (2,055 mi)
- Surface elevation: 118.7 m (389 ft)
- Islands: 3318 (Hautuumaasaari, Ukonkivi)
- Settlements: Inari
- ^{1} Shore length is not a well-defined measure.

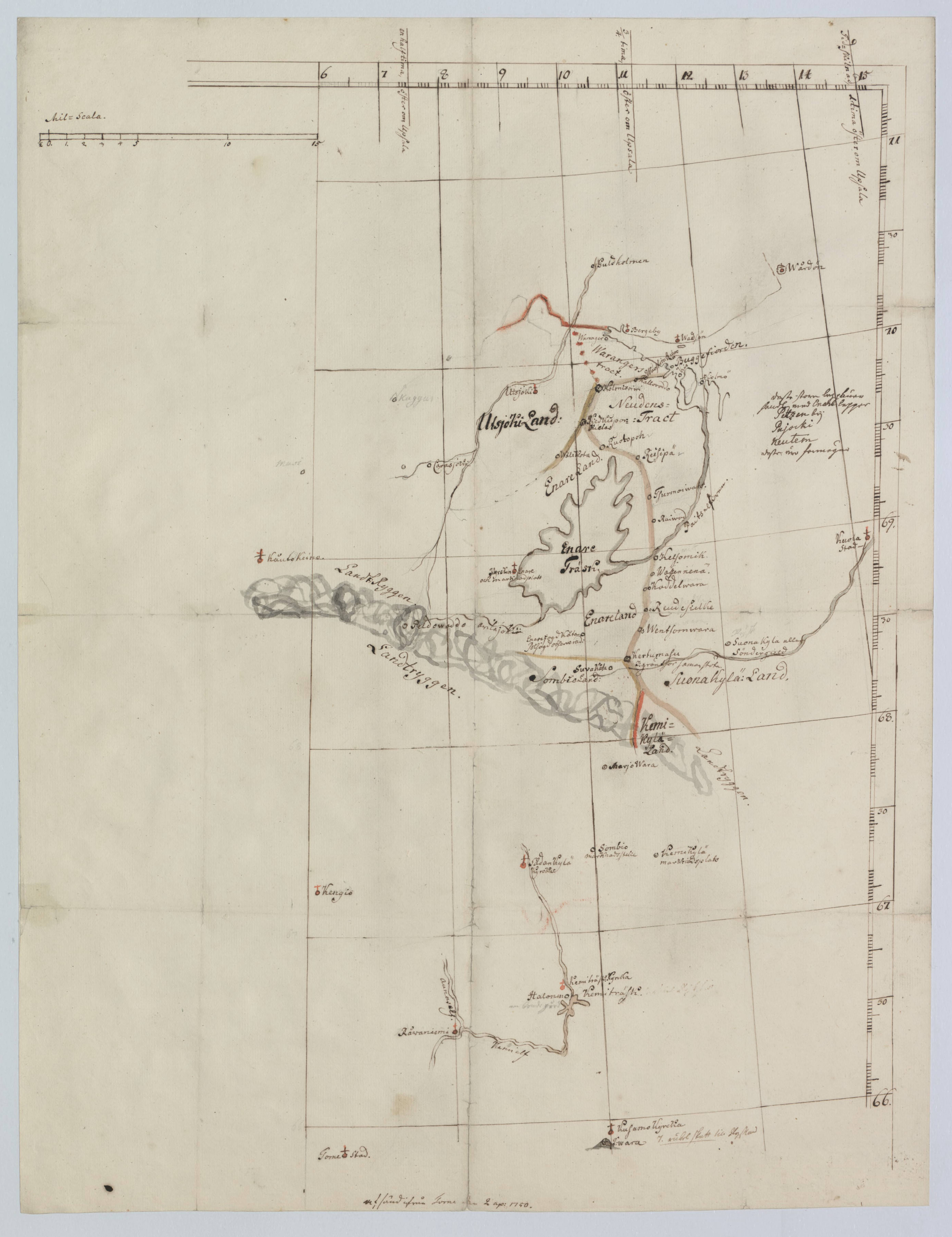
Map from the 18th century of Lake Inari with surroundings.

Lake Inari (Finnish: Inarijärvi/Inarinjärvi, Northern Sami: Anárjávri, Inari Sami: Aanaarjävri, Skolt Sami: Aanarjäuʹrr, Swedish: Enare träsk, Norwegian: Enaresjøen) is the largest lake in Sápmi and the third-largest lake in Finland. It is located in the northern part of Lapland, north of the Arctic Circle. The lake is 117–119 metres (384–390 ft) above sea level, and is regulated at the Kaitakoski power plant in Russia. The freezing period normally extends from November to early June.

The best-known islands of the lake are Hautuumaasaari ("Graveyard Island"), which served as a cemetery for ancient Sámi people, and Ukonkivi ("Ukko's Stone"), a sacrificial place of the ancient inhabitants of the area. There are over 3,000 islands in total. Trout, lake salmon, Arctic char, white fish, grayling, perch and pike are found in Lake Inari.

The lake covers 1,040 km^{2} (400 sq mi). It empties northwards through the Paatsjoki at the mouth of the Varangerfjord, which is a bay of the Barents Sea.

The lake depression is a graben bounded by faults active in the Cenozoic.

The name of Lake Inari comes possibly from a Pre-Finno-Ugric substrate language.

On 28 December 1984, a Soviet guided missile crashed into the Lake Inari.
