= Finland–Norway border =

International border

Coordinates: 69°23′54″N 25°50′36″E

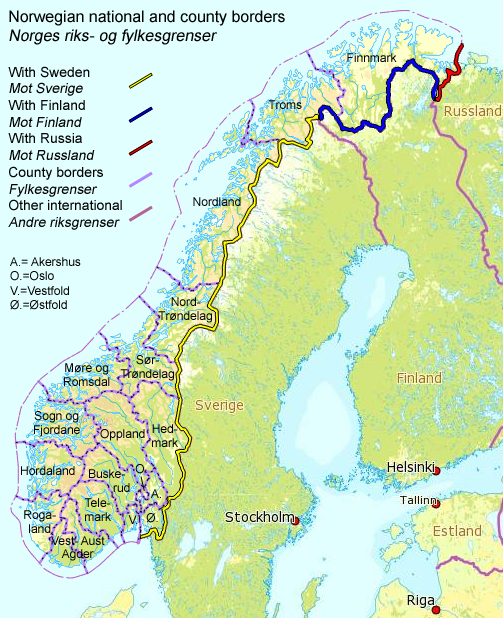
Norway's national borders Norway–Sweden border Norway–Finland border Norway–Russia border

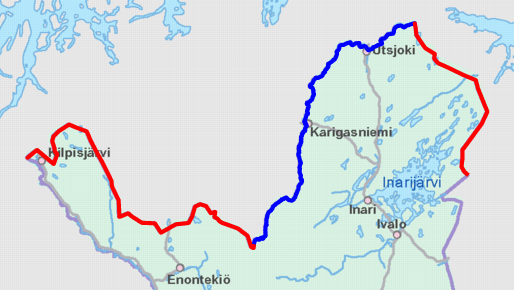
Land border highlighted in red, river border in blue.

Norway and Finland share a 736 kilometers (457 mi) long border. It is a land and river border between two tripoints. The western tripoint is marked by Treriksröset, a concrete cairn where both countries border Sweden. The eastern tripoint is marked by Treriksrøysa, a stone cairn where both countries border Russia.

== Course of the border ==
The border begins in the west at the Three-Country Cairn, a concrete cairn located in Lake Koltajärvi where the borders of Finland, Norway, and Sweden meet. From there, the border runs for 291 km across a landscape of mountains and fells to the headwaters of the Tana river system. The western part of the land border follows approximately the watershed between the Arctic Ocean and the Baltic Sea.

More than third of the border (294 km) is formed by the Anarjohka (Inarijoki) and Tana (Teno) rivers. In these river sections, the border is not marked by physical cairns but is defined by the deep-water channel (thalweg), with its official course determined by border maps. The river border continues until the village of Polmak.

From the end of the river section, the eastern land border runs for 151 km to the eastern tripoint on the hill of Muotkavaara, where the borders of Finland, Norway, and Russia converge. The extreme eastern end of Norway (including the town of Kirkenes) reaches east of Finland, forming a wedge between Finland and Russia.

There is an 5-meter (16 ft) wide clear-cut zone along the land border in forest areas. A fairly large share of the western part of the border goes over treeless mountains. There are 57 original cairns north of Treriksröset from until 1766, numbered 293–342 west of Anarjohka river and 343–349 east of Tana river. Later cairns numbered 343–353 were erected east of Nesseby, and cairns in between the originals are marked with a number followed by a letter.

== History ==
=== Fellesdistrikt ===
Before 1809, Finland was a part of the Swedish Kingdom, and the modern border between Norway and Finland traces back to the earlier border between Norway and Sweden.

Prior to the establishment of fixed national borders, the northern regions of Fennoscandia were mostly inhabited by the Sámi people. As early as the 13th century, the area functioned as a fellesdistrikt, a common taxation zone for Norway and Novgorod (later Russia). In the 14th century, the Birkarls, acting on behalf of the Swedish crown, also began collecting taxes from the Sámi. The fellesdistrikt extended from the Kola Peninsula in the east to the Lyngen fjord in the west. The Sámi communities (siidas) could be forced to pay taxes to two or even three different kingdoms.

The rivalry between the states in the northern regions intensified in the 16th and 17th centuries. Under King Karl IX, Sweden aggressively pursued claims in Finnmark to gain access to the Arctic Ocean. These ambitions were a primary cause of the Kalmar War (1611–1613) between Denmark–Norway and Sweden. The subsequent Treaty of Knäred in 1613 forced Sweden to renounce all its territorial claims to the coastal areas north of Tysfjord. While the peace treaty did not establish a fixed border, the fellesdistrikt became more precisely defined in documents.

=== Norway–Sweden border ===
The first formal demarcation of the border between Norway and Sweden was established by the Treaty of Strömstad on October 2, 1751. Field investigations and negotiations for the treaty took place between 1738 and 1751. In addition to defining other parts of the Norway–Sweden border, the agreement partitioned the western part of the fellesdistrikt between Sweden and Denmark–Norway. Karasjok, Kautokeino, and half of the Utsjoki area were transferred to Norwegian control, while the area south of the Tana river became part of Sweden. The treaty included the Lapp Codicil, an addendum that guaranteed the Sámi people the right to move across the border.

Following the treaty, a border demarcation was conducted between 1764 and 1766, during which 55 cairns were erected on the Norwegian–Finnish border between Koltajärvi (Golddajávri) in the west and Kolmisoaivi (Golmmešoaivi) in the east. The endpoint of this demarcation, Kolmisoaivi, marked the beginning of the remaining Russo-Norwegian part of the fellesdistrikt in Neiden. This point was initially marked only with a small, temporary cairn. The border demarcation also established that the border within the Tana River system follows the thalweg, the line of lowest elevation within the river. This principle has been upheld in all subsequent demarcations.

Based on the Treaty of Strömstad, border demarcations on the present-day Finland–Norway border were carried out in 1786, 1794–95, and 1805–06. Detailed information has only been preserved for the last of these reviews.

=== Border between Norway and the Grand Duchy of Finland ===
Following Finland's incorporation into the Russian Empire as an autonomous Grand Duchy of Finland in 1809, and Norway's personal union with Sweden in 1814, the political landscape of northern Fennoscandia changed significantly. This created the need to formally define the remaining shared border areas. A new border treaty was negotiated between Norway–Sweden and Russia in 1826. The border established in the Treaty of Strömstad was confirmed as the boundary between the Grand Duchy of Finland and Norway, and the easternmost section of the border was defined. The remaining part of the fellesdistrikt was formally dissolved and divided between Norway, Grand Duchy of Finland and Russia.

The era of a legally protected open border came to an end in 1852, when the border between Norway and the Russian Empire (including Finland) was officially closed to reindeer migration. This act nullified the rights guaranteed in the 1751 Lapp Codicil and had devastating consequences for the Sámi, who needed the Finnish forests for reindeer winter grazing. The closure was a contributing factor to the Kautokeino Rebellion of the same year. Although both Finland and Norway today are part of the Schengen Area, allowing people to cross the border freely at any point, the 19th-century rule preventing reindeer migration remains in effect. This is enforced by a reindeer fence along parts of the border. To facilitate human passage in line with Schengen rules, stairs are built over the fence for pedestrians, and gates are in place for all-terrain vehicles (ATVs), creating a border that is open for people but closed for animals.

The negotiations that led to the closure were initiated due to long-standing disputes across the border following the 1826 treaty. A key issue was the conflict over resources. Finnish authorities complained that Norwegian Sámi reindeer herds were causing "countless losses" to Finnish Sámi, while Norway was concerned about fishing rights, particularly on the Tana river. During the subsequent negotiations, Russia-Finland initially opposed closing the border, but Norway supported it. Norwegian officials did not see the closure as a problem, but hoped that by cutting off the Sámi's access to their winter pastures in Finland, the reindeer herders would be forced to abandon their migratory pastoralism and settle permanently along the coast as fishermen.

In 1846, the entire border between was surveyed. Between Muotkavaara and Kolmisoaivi, six new cairns were built, among them the Muotkavaara cairn. Muotkavaara (Muotkevárri) had been designated in 1833 as the endpoint of the border between the Grand Duchy of Finland and Russia. In connection with the demarcation, regular border reviews were established every 25 years.

During the 1871 border demarcation, 30 new border markers were built and routine repairs were carried out.

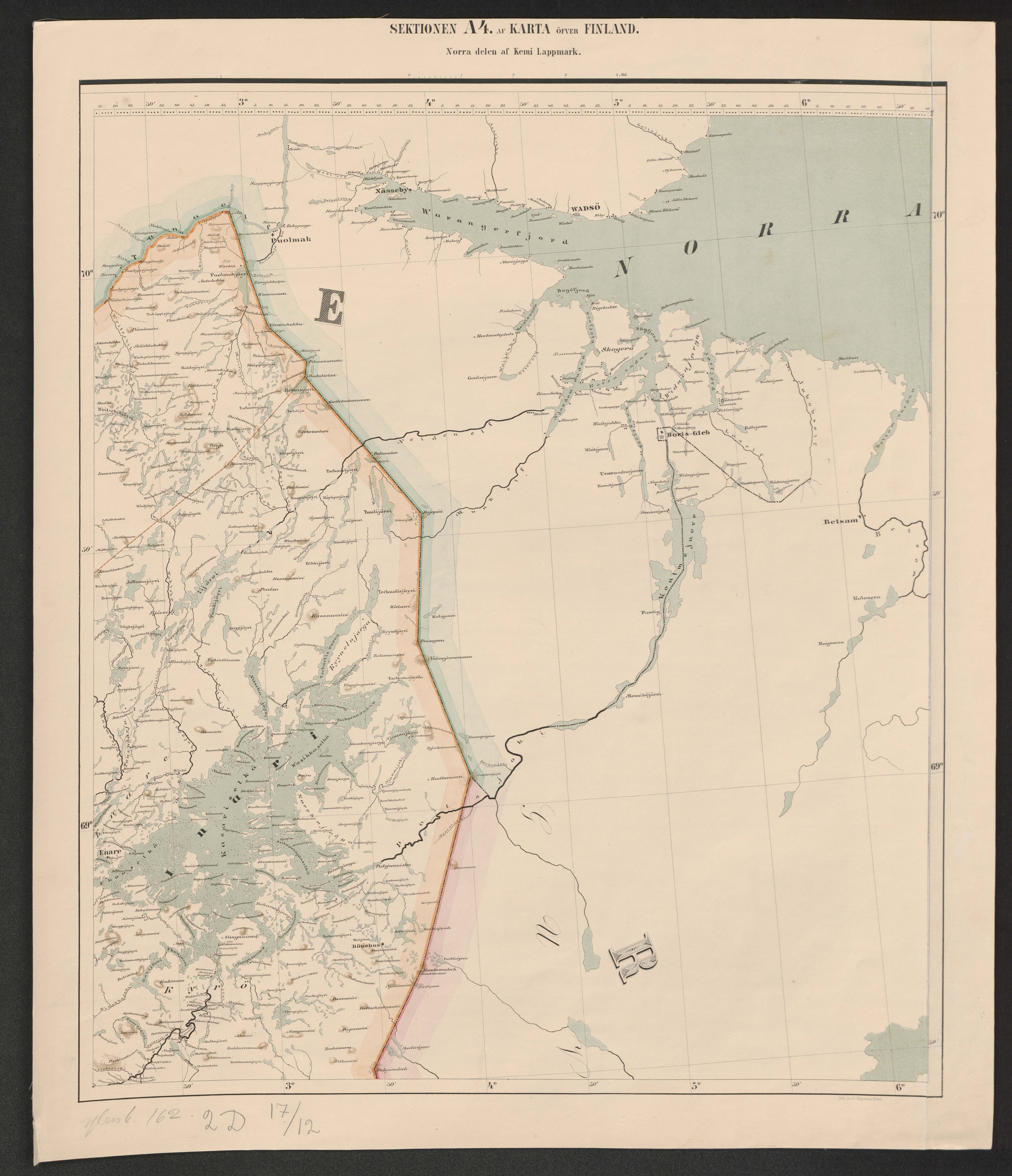
The general map of Finland from 1873 shows the border between Kolmisoaivi and Muotkavaara before it was corrected.

The 1896–1897 border demarcation revealed that the 1873 Finnish general map lacked an entire strip of Finnish territory along the Norwegian border. In Lapland, the map had relied on rough estimates instead of precise measurements, and the border had been drawn about 20 km too far inside Finland. The discovery spurred a more comprehensive land surveying program in Lapland. Beginning in 1899, new geodetic surveys were carried out between Kolmisoaivi and Muotkavaara, correcting the old mapping and shifting the border eastward by 21 km^{2} in Finland's favor.

=== Border between Norway and the Republic of Finland ===
Following the Treaty of Tartu in 1920, Finland gained control of the Petsamo area. From 1920 until 1944, this meant the Finland–Norway border was significantly longer, extending along the path of the current Norway–Russia border to the Arctic Ocean. As a consequence of the 1944 Moscow Armistice, Finland ceded the Petsamo territory to the Soviet Union.

Finland's acquisition of Petsamo caused the scheduled 1921 border demarcation to be postponed until 1925. This review saw the construction of 36 new cairns and the standardization of many older ones. Heartstones on the Finnish side that had Russian engravings were replaced with new stones marked with the text "SUOMI". The agreement of April 28, 1924, concerning the border of Petsamo and Finnmark, also reaffirmed the 25-year cycle for regular demarcations.

The next border reviews took place in 1950 (54 new cairns, bringing the total to 192) and 1975–1976 (16 new cairns, total 208). These reviews involved creating new, more accurate maps, some based on aerial photography.

The main objectives of the 1997–2001 border review were to clarify the border's course, define it in a unified coordinate system (UTM Euref89), and create new digital documentation using aerial photography. The official width of the border vista was narrowed from 8 to 5 meters. During this work, one new cairn was built and another was moved, bringing the total number of cairns to 209. The final documents were signed in Oslo on December 18, 2001.

== Traffic ==
The Finland–Norway border has been open since the 1950s, when Denmark, Finland, Norway and Sweden established the Nordic Passport Union and agreed to remove passport control at the internal Nordic borders. Nowadays both Norway and Finland are also part of the Schengen Area. It is legal to cross the border anywhere if no customs declaration or passport check is needed. A treaty gives the customs officers of one country the right to carry out clearance and checks for both countries.

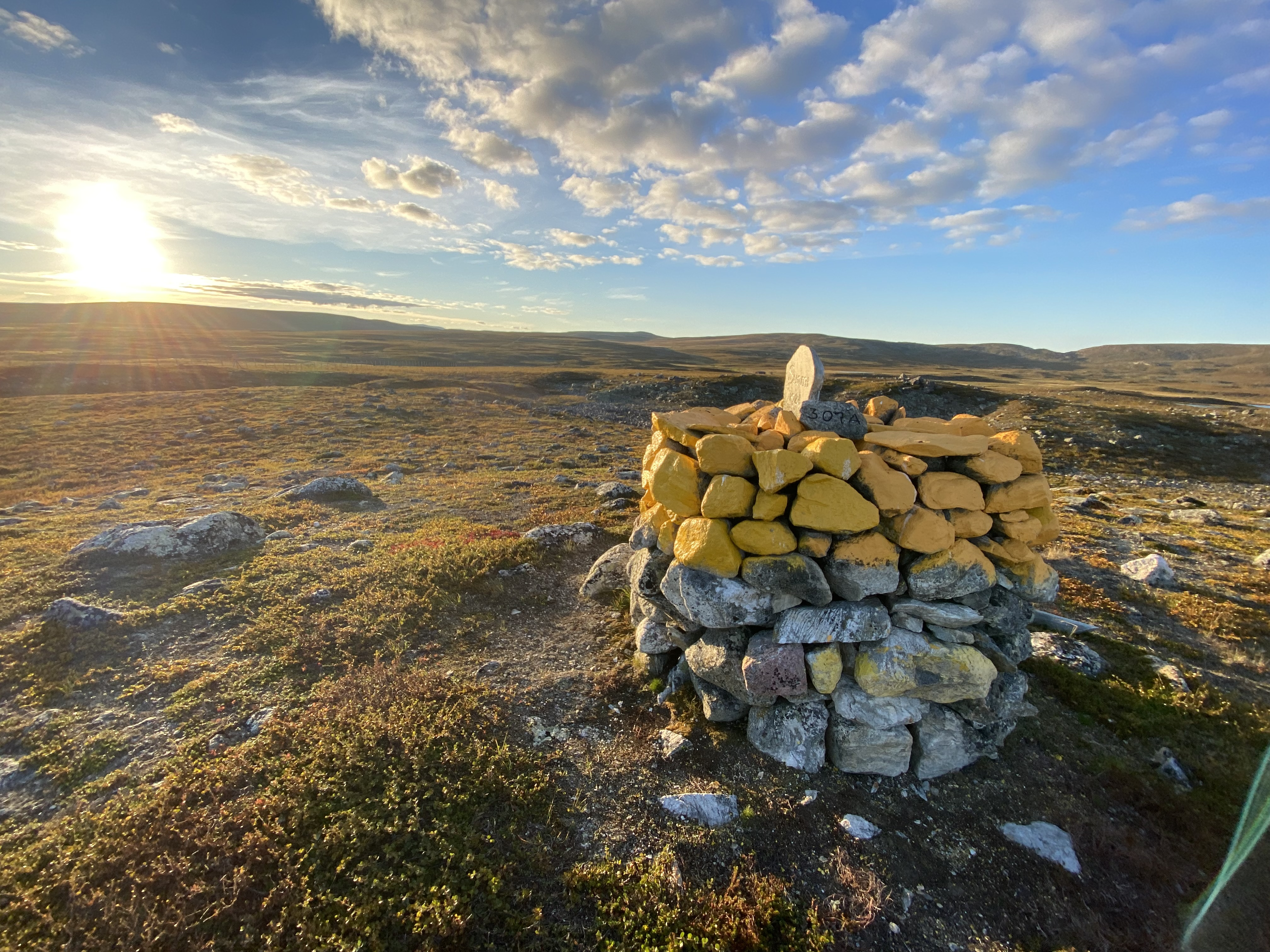
Finland–Norway border cairn 307a, dated 1925, near Siđusgohpi in Reisa National Park. The border reindeer fence is visible on the left.

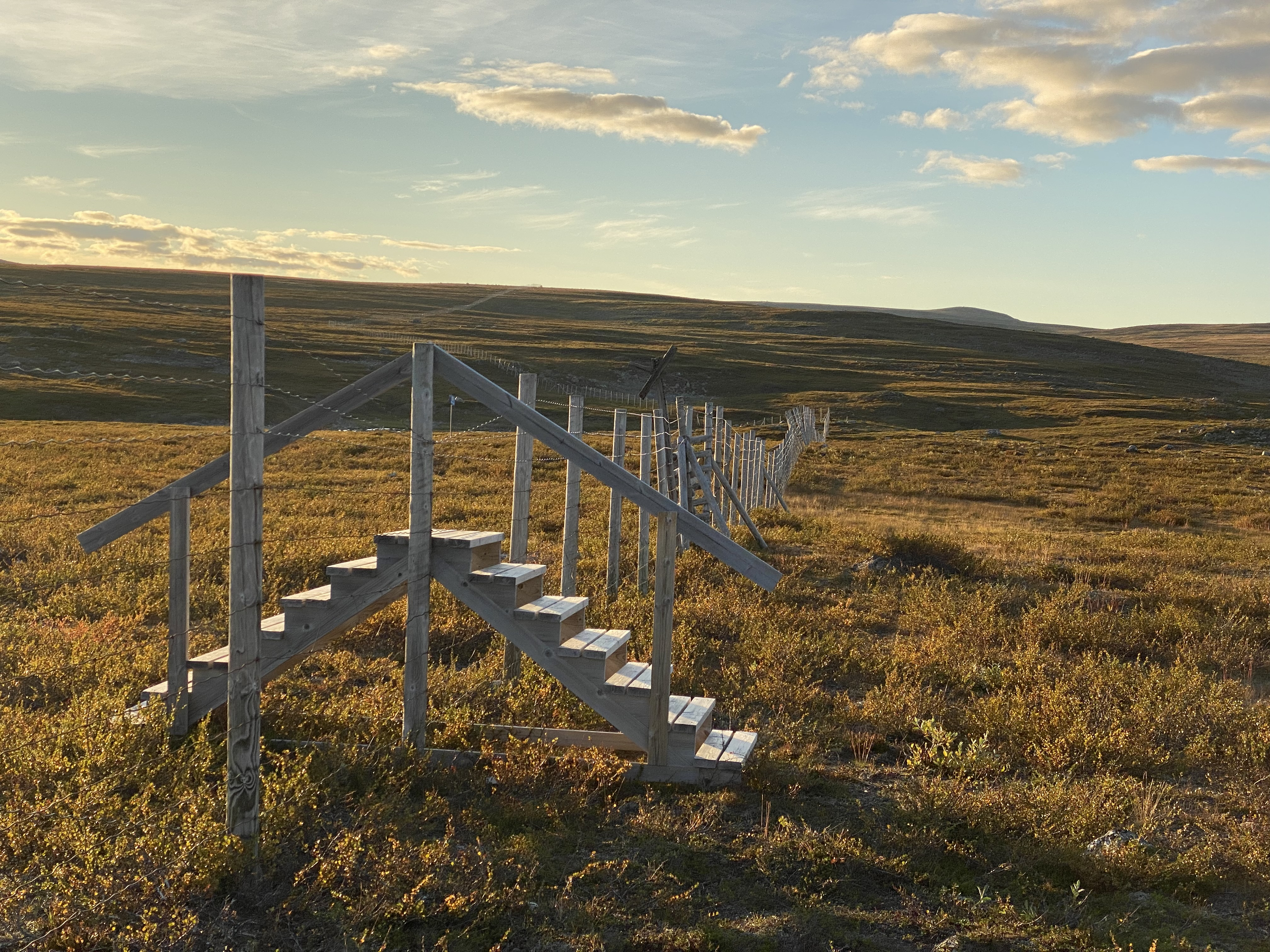
Fence with stairs and ATV gate along the Finland–Norway border in Siđusgohpi between Käsivarsi Wilderness Area and Reisa National Park. Reindeer are prevented from crossing the border, while humans can cross freely.

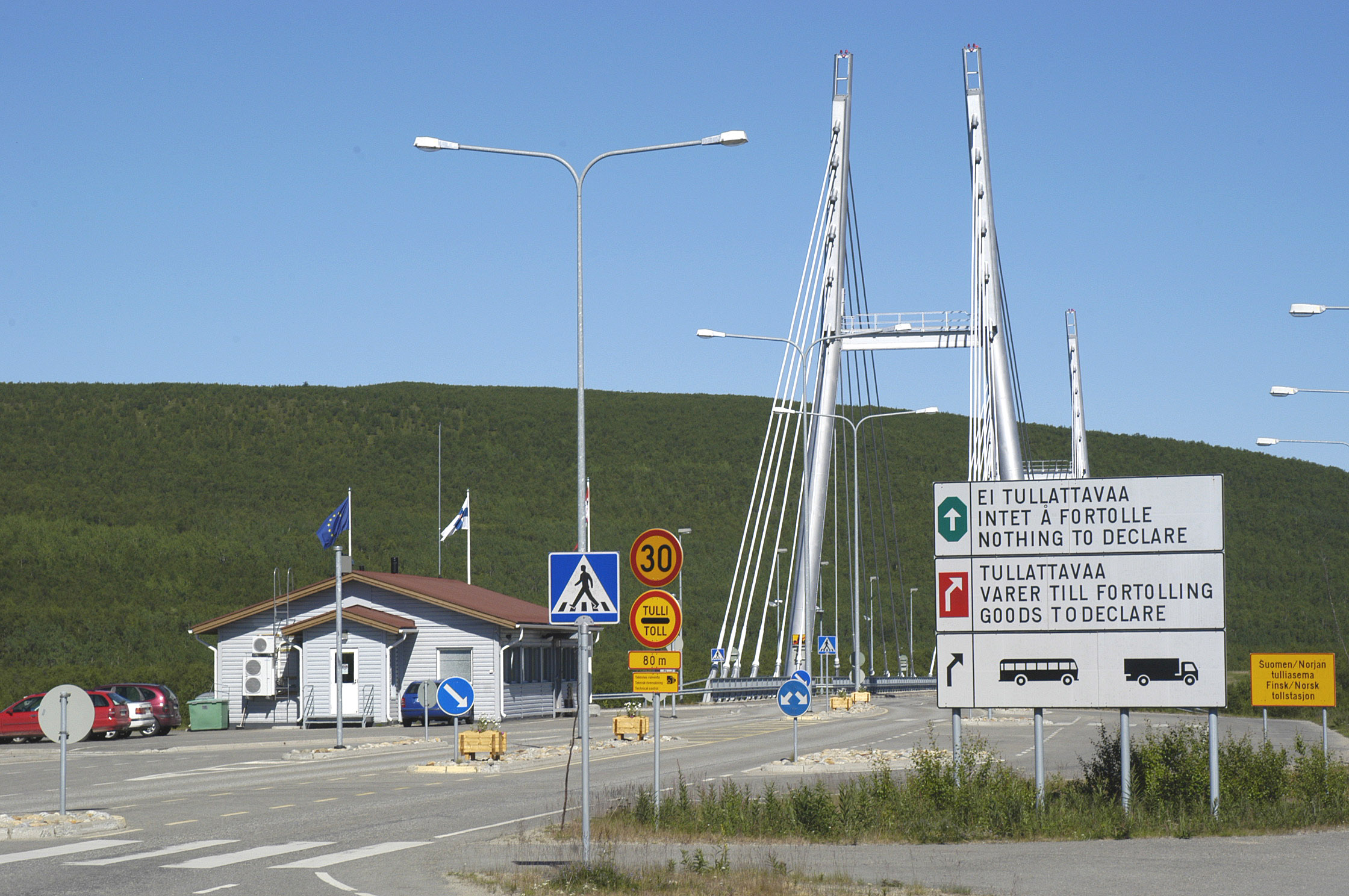
Utsjoki, the national border between Finland and Norway, with Sami Bridge

=== List of road border crossings ===
From east to west:

- Neiden (road 92), N
- Polmak (road 970/895), N
- Utsjoki (road E75), F
- Karigasniemi (road 92), F
- Kivilompolo (road E45), F
- Helligskogen (road E8), N

N = customs station on the Norwegian side
F = customs station on the Finnish side

All road crossings on this border have customs stations.

== See also ==
- Borders of Norway
- Finnish Border Guard
- Norwegian Police Service
- Finland–Norway relations

== Sources ==
- Suomen ja Norjan välinen valtakunnanraja: Rajapöytäkirja / Riksgrensen mellom Norge og Finland: Grenseprotokoll [Finland–Norway national border: Border protocol] (Report) (in Finnish and Norwegian). Oslo. 18 December 2001.
- Lähteenmäki, Maria (2004). Kalotin kansaa (in Finnish). Helsinki: Suomalaisen Kirjallisuuden Seura. ISBN 951-746-599-8.
