= Paatsjoki =

River in the country of Finland

Paatsjoki River: Paatsjoki (Finnish); Báhčaveajjohka (Northern Sami); Paččjokk (Skolt Sami); Pasvikelva (Norwegian); Патсойоки (Russian); Pasvik älv (Swedish)
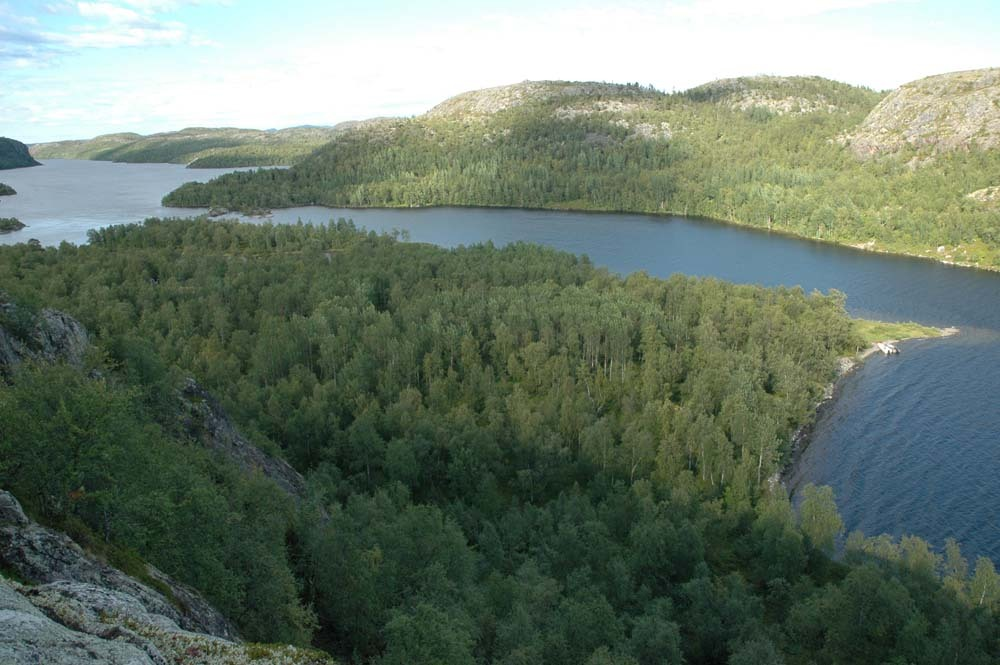
- Harefossen and the Paatsjoki River
- Interactive map of the river

Location
- Countries: Finland; Norway; Russia

Physical characteristics
- Source
  - location: Lake Inari
  - coordinates: 68°53′30″N 028°22′00″E
  - elevation: 118 metres (387 ft)
- Mouth
  - location: Bøkfjorden
  - elevation: 0 metres (0 ft)
- Length: 145 km (90 mi)
- Basin size: 18,344 km^{2} (7,083 sq mi)
- Discharge
  - average: 175 m^{3}/s (6,200 cu ft/s)

The Paatsjoki River (Finnish: Paatsjoki, Skolt Sami: Paaččjokk, Northern Sami: Báhčaveaijohka, Norwegian: Pasvikelva, Swedish: Pasvik älv, Russian: Паз or Патсойоки, Paz or Patsoyoki) is a river that flows through Finland, Norway, and Russia. Since 1826, the river has marked parts of the Norway–Russia border, except from 1920 to 1944 when it was along the Finland–Norway border.

The river is the outlet for the large Lake Inari in Finland and flows through Norway and Russia to discharge into the Bøkfjorden (which later flows into the Varangerfjorden and then the Barents Sea), not far from the town of Kirkenes. The river has a watershed of 18,404 square kilometres (7,106 sq mi), and is 145 kilometres (90 mi) long. A series of hydroelectric stations, known as the Paatsjoki River Hydroelectric Plants, are along the river. Five of those seven power stations are Russian.

The river provides good fishing opportunities for Atlantic salmon, although fishermen must ensure that their fishing lines do not cross the international border.
