= Structure of the Norwegian Army =

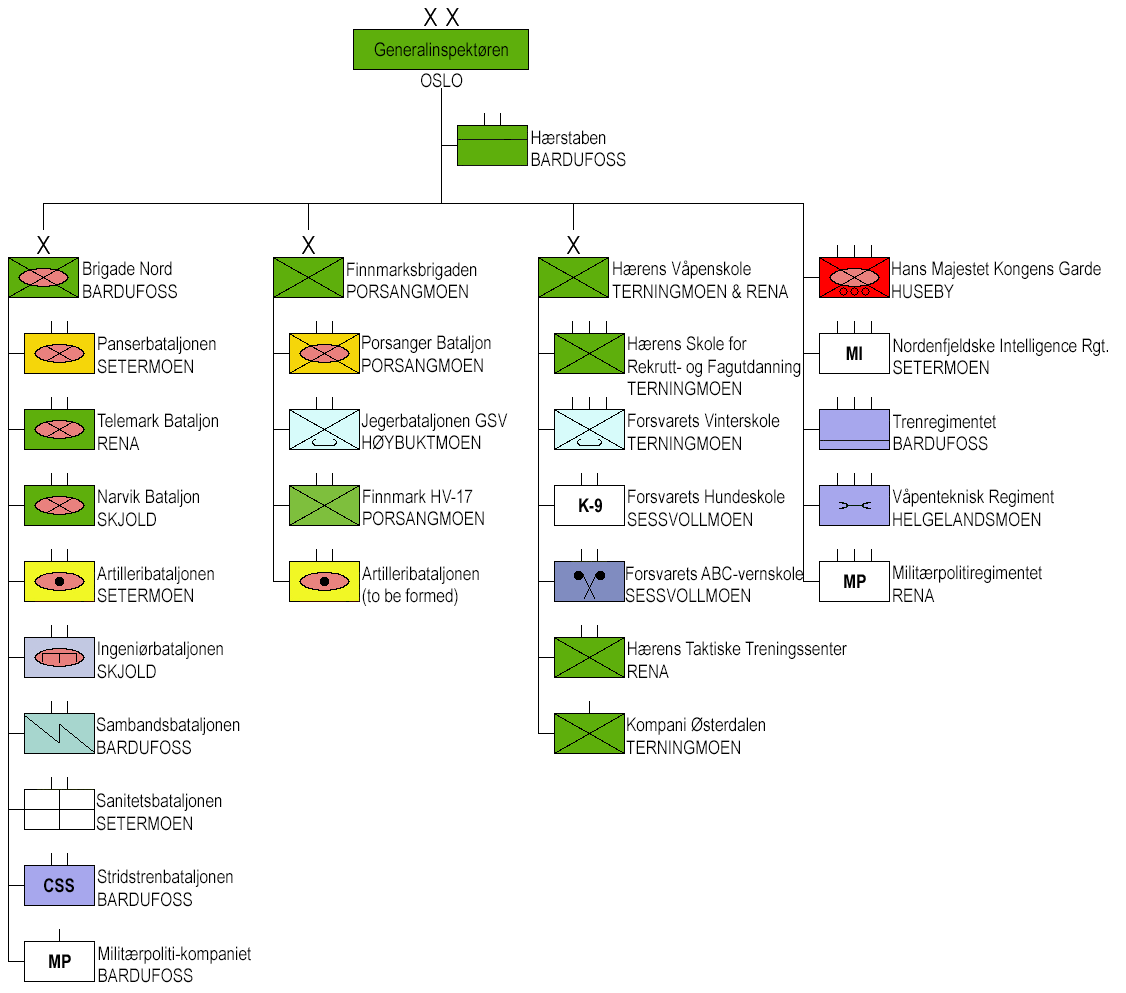
Norwegian Army organization as of November 2026

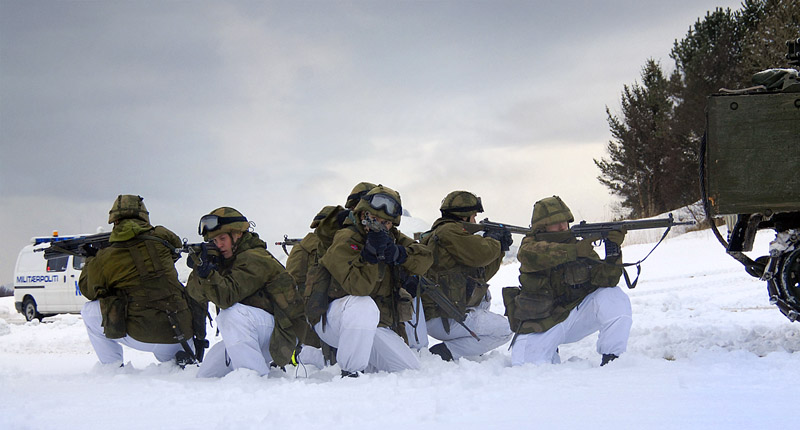
2nd Battalion during a training exercise

The Structure of the Norwegian Army has seen considerable change over the years. In 2009, the Army introduced the new command and control organization. As of April 2025 the army is organized as follows:

== Chief of Staff ==
The Chief of the Army and the Army Staff are based in Bardufoss, Northern Norway.

- Chief of the Army
  - Army Staff (Hærstaben)

== Brigade Nord ==
Brigade Nord (lit. 'Brigade North') is the largest unit in the Norwegian Army. The Brigade has several battalions across Norway, including Telemark Battalion at Camp Rena, eastern Norway. One unnamed Armoured Battalion is under raising.

Brigade Command, in Bardufoss

Armoured Battalion (Panserbataljonen), in Setermoen with Leopard 2A4NO main battle tanks and CV90 infantry fighting vehicles

Telemark Battalion (Telemark Bataljon), in Rena with Leopard 2A4NO main battle tanks and CV90 infantry fighting vehicles

Narvik Battalion (Narvik Bataljon), in Skjold with Leopard 2A4NO main battle tanks and CV90 infantry fighting vehicles

Artillery Battalion (Artilleribataljonen), in Setermoen with K9 Thunder self-propelled artillery, and NASAMS air defense system + NOMADS short range air defense

Combat Engineer Battalion (Ingeniørbataljonen), in Skjold

Signals Battalion (Sambandsbataljonen), in Bardufoss

Medical Battalion (Sanitetsbataljonen), in Setermoen

Combat Service Support Battalion (Stridstrenbataljonen), in Bardufoss

Military Police Company (Militærpoliti-kompaniet), in Bardufoss

== Finnmark Brigade ==
Finnmark Brigade (Finnmarksbrigaden), in Porsangmoen is in charge of safeguarding Norway's northernmost land territories and the land border to Russia. It is a joint command, including an army staff and army and Home Guard units. It was converted from the Finnmark Land Command (Finnmark Landforsvar) on 20 August 2025.

Finnmark Brigade Staff, in Porsangmoen

Porsanger Battalion (Porsanger Bataljon), cavalry battalion in Porsangmoen with CV90 infantry fighting vehicles

Ranger Battalion GSV (Jegerbataljonen GSV), infantry battalion in Høybuktmoen guarding the Norway–Russia border

17th Home Guard District Finnmark (Finnmark Heimevernsdistrikt 17), in Porsangermoen

Kristiansten Artillery Battalion (Kristiansten artilleribataljon), in Porsangermoen with K9 Thunder self-propelled artillery

Skoganvarre Signals Company (Skoganvarre sambandskompani), in Porsangermoen

Combat Air Defense Battery (Kampluftvernbatteriet), in Porsangermoen

== Norwegian Army Land Warfare Centre ==
Norwegian Army Land Warfare Centre (Hærens våpenskole), in Terningmoen and Rena

- Departments:
  - Maneuver School (Manøverskolen)
  - Artillery School (Artilleriskolen)
  - Engineer School (Ingeniørskolen)
  - Logistics School (Logistikkskolen)
  - Signals School (Sambandsskolen)
  - Medical School (Sanitetsskolen)

Army Recruit and Vocational Training School (Hærens skole for rekrutt- og fagutdanning), in Terningmoen and Rena
- Team Leader School (Lagførerskolen)

NATO Centre of Excellence - Cold Weather Operations (Forsvarets Vinterskole), in Terningmoen, manages as the Norwegian School of Winter Warfare

Armed Forces Canine School (Forsvarets hundeskole), in Sessvollmoen

Armed Forces CBRN-defense School (Forsvarets ABC-vernskole), in Sessvollmoen

Army Tactical Training Center (Hærens Taktiske Treningssenter), in Rena

(Security) Company Østerdalen (Kompani Østerdalen), in Terningmoen

== Other units ==
His Majesty The King's Guard (Hans Majestet Kongens Garde), in Huseby

Nordenfjeldske Intelligence Regiment, in Setermoen Military Intelligence & Electronic Warfare unit

Logistic Regiment (Trenregimentet), in Bardufoss - logistics, supply

Weapons Technical Regiment (Våpenteknisk Regiment), in Helgelandsmoen - material maintenance and storage

Military Police Regiment (Militærpolitiregimentet), in Rena

== Special forces ==
The Army's special forces unit Forsvarets Spesialkommando (FSK) is no longer part of the army. With the establishment of the Norwegian Special Operations Command in 2014, Norway's two special forces units (FSK and Marinejegerkommandoen) were united under the one command in the Norwegian Armed Forces, with the Air Force's 339 Special Operations Aviation Squadron at Rygge Air Station joining later as the SOC's air force component.
