= Porsanger =

Porsanger may refer to:

== Places ==
- Porsanger Municipality, a municipality in Finnmark county, Norway
- Porsanger Peninsula, peninsula in Finnmark county, Norway
- Porsanger Fjord, fjord in Finnmark county, Norway

== People ==
- Anders Porsanger (1735–1780), first Sami who received a higher education
- Jelena Porsanger (born 1967), Russian Sami ethnographer and university rector

== Military ==
- Garrison of Porsanger, based at Porsangmoen in Porsanger, Norway; the world's northernmost military garrison
- Porsanger Battalion, an armoured reconnaissance unit of the Norwegian Army

== Other ==
- Porsanger IL, Norwegian multi-sports club from Lakselv, Finnmark
