= Finnmarksbrigaden =

Upcoming military unit of the Norwegian army

Finnmark Brigade
- Finnmarksbrigaden
- Insignia of Finnmarksbrigaden
- Active: 2025–present
- Country: Norway
- Branch: Norwegian Army
- Type: Brigade
- Role: Mechanised Infantry
- Size: 1,300 (Note: As of June 2025)
- Garrison/HQ: Porsanger
- Colours: Umbra green beret
- Mascot: Vargen ( the wolf)

Commanders
- Current commander: Brigadier John Olav Fuglem

Insignia
- Standard

Finnmarksbrigaden (lit. 'the Finnmark Brigade') is a unit in the Norwegian army, as a further development of the Finnmark Land Command. It was officially established on 20 August 2025, and is expected to be fully operational by 2032. The main garrison of the brigade is Porsangmoen, in Finnmark county.

The plan includes the creation of a new light infantry battalion, in addition to the two existing maneuver battalions, the infantry battalion and the ranger battalion. Combat air defense and an artillery battalion will also be established within the framework, followed by an reconnaissance company. A combat engineering company will be further developed from the existing structure.

== Organisation ==
- Finnmark Brigade
  - Brigade Command, in Porsangmoen
  - Porsanger Battalion (Porsanger bataljon), in Porsanger
  - Ranger Battalion, (Jegerbataljonen GSV), in Høybuktmoen
  - 17th Home Guard District Finnmark, (Finnmark Heimevernsdistrikt 17), in Porsanger
  - Kristiansten Artillery Battalion (Kristiansten artilleribataljon), in Porsanger
  - Skoganvarre Signals Company (Skoganvarre sambandskompani), in Porsanger
  - Combat Air Defense Battery (Kampluftvernbatteriet), in Porsanger
