= Jegerkompaniet =

Jegerkompaniet / ISTAR
- Active: 1946-2011
- Country: Norway
- Branch: Army
- Type: Light Infantry
- Role: ISTAR
- Size: One reinforced company
- Garrison/HQ: Porsanger
- Motto: Agmine Consectamur (We hunt in packs)
- Colors: Blue and Yellow
- March: Det mystiske Jegerkompani (The mystical Jeger company)

Jegerkompaniet (Ranger Company) / ISTAR was the Norwegian Army's northernmost unit. It was deployed to the world's northernmost military garrison, Porsangmoen, at 70 degrees northern latitude. The company had both conscripts and professional soldiers, consisting of approximately one hundred soldiers. The unit was specialized in unconventional warfare and guerrilla tactics and long range reconnaissance deep behind enemy lines, with no support from other units, in all weather conditions and in all terrain, for periods of up to 30 days.

Training at the Jegerkompaniet was similar to training at other ranger units, with the exception that much more time was spent on winter training. The overall goal of the training was to produce arctic rangers that are capable of combat and survival behind enemy lines for periods of up to 30 days with no support from other units.

The company was temporarily deactivated in summer of 2011. It was brought back in the summer of 2018, where their main base of deployment is the Garrison of Sør-Varanger.

== See also ==
- Jäger (military)
