= Norwegian Army =

Land warfare branch of the Norwegian Armed Forces

- Hæren
- Founded: 1628; 398 years ago
- Country: Norway
- Type: Army
- Role: Ground warfare
- Size: 8,733 soldiers and employees
- Part of: Norwegian Armed Forces
- Headquarters: Bardufoss Garrison, Bardufoss, Troms, Norway
- Mottos: For alt vi har. Og alt vi er. ("For everything we have. And everything we are").
- March: Norsk National Marsj
- Engagements: Torstenson War; Second Northern War; Scanian War; Great Northern War; Theater War; Dano-Swedish War of 1808–09; Gunboat War; Swedish–Norwegian War (1814); World War II; Independent Norwegian Brigade Group in Germany (1947–1953); Cold War; Lebanon War; Bosnian War; Kosovo War; 1999 East Timorese crisis; War in Afghanistan; War on terrorism; Operation Inherent Resolve
- Website: Official website

Commanders
- Commander-in-Chief: Haakon VIII
- Prime Minister: (Norway) Jonas Gahr Støre
- Minister of Defence: Bjørn Arild Gram
- Chief of Defence: General Eirik Kristoffersen
- Chief of the Norwegian Army: Major General Lars Lervik
- Command Sergeant Major of the Norwegian Army: Sergeant Major Espen Tandstad

The Norwegian Army (Norwegian: Hæren) is the land warfare service branch of the Norwegian Armed Forces. The Army is the oldest Norwegian service branch, established as a modern military organisation under the command of the King of Norway in 1628. The Army participated in various continental wars during the 17th, 18th, and 19th centuries as well, both in Norway and abroad, especially in World War II (1939–1945). From December 1951, much of the Norwegian Army was declared for operations as part of Allied Forces Northern Europe, within the NATO Military Command Structure.

== History ==
=== Creation of the Norwegian Army ===
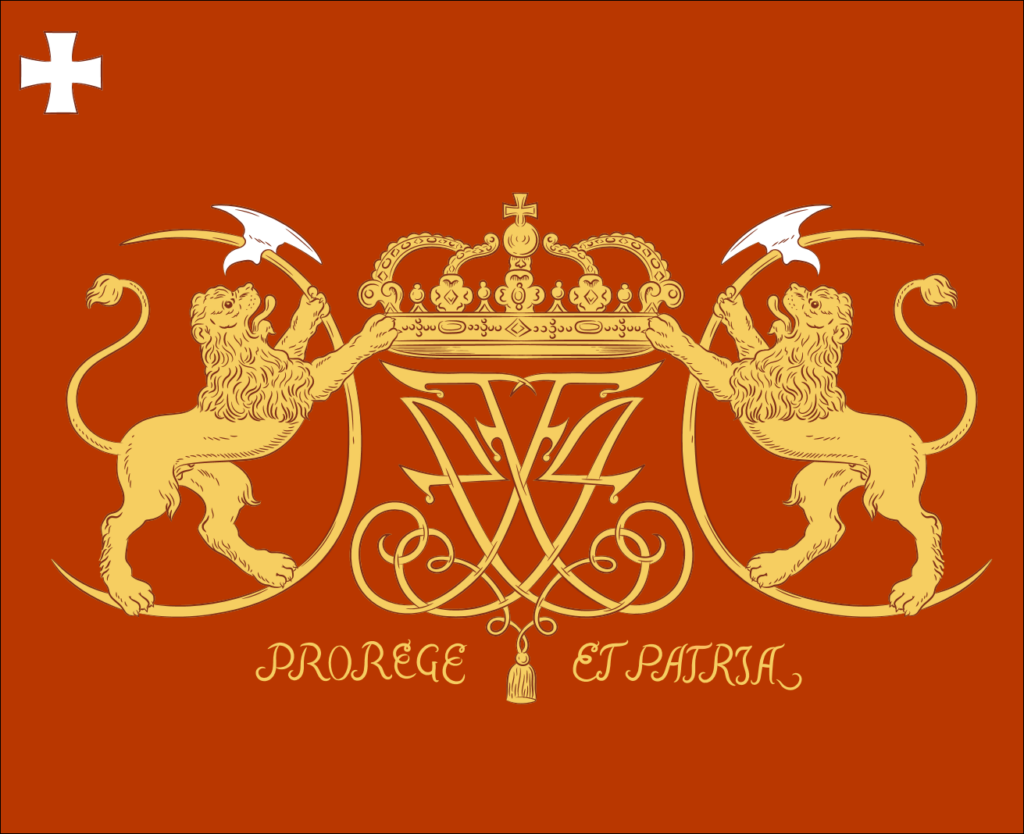
Norwegian Infantry Regiment ensign during Denmark-Norway

After the Kalmar War broke out in 1611, the Danish-Norwegian king, Christian IV tried to revive the leidang, with dire results. As the Norwegian peasantry had not been armed or trained in the use of arms for nearly three centuries, they were not able to fight. The soldiers deserted or were captured. The soldiers had to participate in military drills while providing supplementary labor to the local community when not in active service. Although the army still did not represent the whole nation, as city residents were exempt from military duty, 1628 is generally regarded by historians as the year when the modern Norwegian army was born.

As a result of the Torstenson War (Danish: Torstenssonfejden, Norwegian: Hannibalfeiden, Swedish: Torstensonska kriget) lasting from 1643 to 1645, Danish–Norwegian territories were to be ceded to Sweden. This led Christian IV to invite German mercenaries to coach and command the Danish–Norwegian armed forces: a decision echoing down the centuries in traces of German vocabulary used by the Norwegian military to this day.

In the early 18th century the Swedes invaded Norway again, and this time the Norwegian army held its own, setting the stage for nearly a century of peace – the longest yet in early modern and modern Norwegian history – during which time a distinct Norwegian identity began to evolve. German ceased to be the official language of command in the army in 1772, in favor of "Dano-Norwegian".

=== Revolutionary and Napoleonic Wars ===
During the French Revolutionary Wars, Denmark–Norway remained neutral in the War of the First Coalition but became embroiled in a war with Britain during the War of the Second Coalition, though Norwegian troops saw no action. Denmark–Norway remained neutral during the Napoleonic Wars until the Battle of Copenhagen in 1807 led Frederick IV of Denmark to ally with the First French Empire, while Sweden was allied with Britain, increasing Dano-Swedish tensions. On 14 March 1808, Denmark–Norway declared war on Sweden; Swedish troops carried out a failed invasion of Norway while Danish and Norwegian forces launched equally unsuccessful attempts to reconquer territories lost to Sweden in the 17th century.

As the Napoleonic era drew to a close, the victorious Sixth Coalition decided to sever Norway from Denmark and unite and award Norway to neighboring Sweden in 1814 at the Congress of Vienna. A royal decree issued on 3 July 1817 decreed that the Norwegian Army should consist of five infantry brigades. There were 1st Akershus, 2nd Akershus, 3rd Trondhjem, 4th Bergen, and 5th Kristiansand infantry brigades. The brigades had a section called the brigade command (5th Brig.kdo.), Which was responsible for the war organization and plans.

=== Union with Sweden ===
The union with Sweden lasted until which time the Norwegian Army retained a separate entity within the joint kingdoms. Financial budgeting, recruitment, regimental organization, and uniforms were all independent of their Swedish counterparts. The basis for recruitment for the Norwegian Army was initially one of conscription for up to five years by lot drawn amongst rural recruits only. A framework was provided by regular soldiers or served, enlisted as long-service volunteers. As with other armies of the period, the payment of a substitute to serve in one's place was permitted. This system was replaced by one of universal conscription introduced in 1854. Enlistment in the active army was however still based on the drawing of ballots, with those escaping full-time service going immediately to the reserve landvern, where they received brief and basic training.

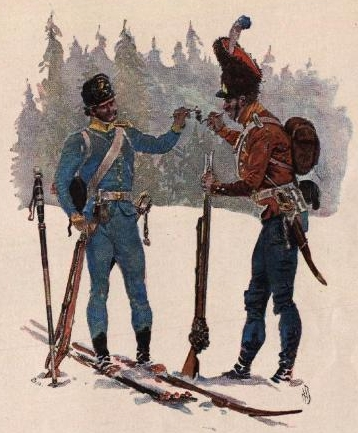
Norwegian troops during the war with Sweden 1808–1809.

In 1884, the basis of service was further modified with the training period being reduced to 90 days. The regulars of the hvervede were reduced to a cadre of career officers, NCOs, and other specialists. The individual Norwegian recruit now passed through three stages of service with the line regiments, the militia, and the territorial reserve during the 13 years that his liability for military service lasted. The left-wing parties of the Storting favored the substitution of part-time volunteer rifle clubs for the regular army but this was opposed by the Storting (Parliament of Norway) parliamentary majority on the basis of the doubtful effectiveness of such a force.

=== Independence ===
In June 1905, the Storting unilaterally dissolved the 91-year-old union with Sweden. After a short but tense period during which both armies were mobilized, Sweden agreed to the peaceful dissolution of the union. In 1911, six brigades were established, which by the Army Order of 1916 were called divisions. The divisions were consecutively numbered without geographical place names. The divisions corresponded to what later became district commands

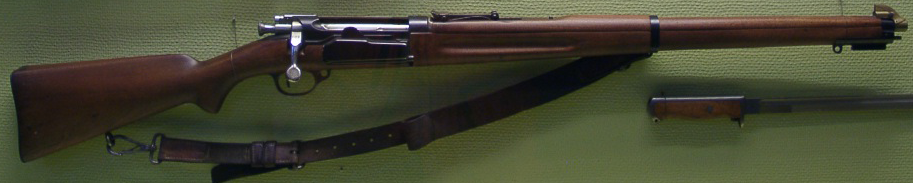
The Norwegian Krag–Jørgensen M/1912, a repeating bolt action carbine

By 1920, the army of Norway was a national militia. Service was universal and compulsory, liability commencing at the age of 18 and continuing till the age of 56. The men were called out at 21, and for the first 12 years belonged to the line; then for 12 years to the landvern. Afterwards they passed into the landstorm, in which they remained until the age of 55 years. The initial training was carried out in recruits' schools; it lasted for 48 days in the infantry and garrison artillery, 62 in the mountain batteries, 72 in the engineers, 92 in the field artillery, and 102 in the cavalry. As soon as their courses were finished the men were transferred to the units to which they would permanently belong, and with them went through a further training of 30 days. Subsequent training consisted of 80 days in the second, third and seventh years of service.

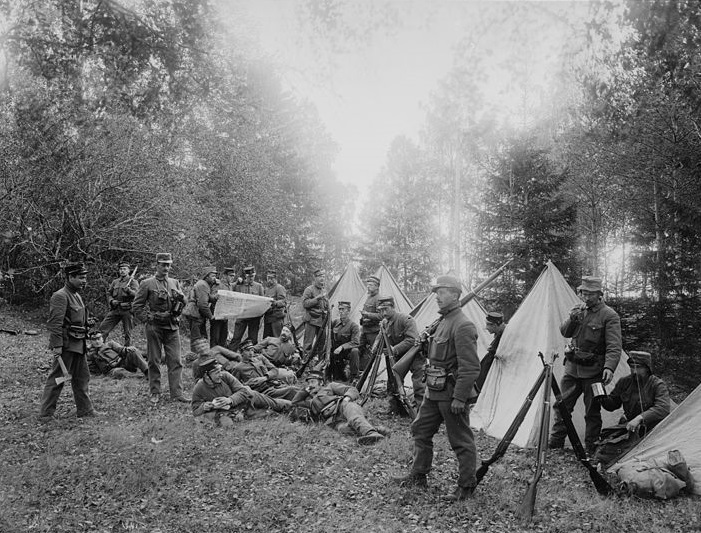
Soldiers of the Norwegian Army in 1905.

The line was organized into 6 divisions of all arms, besides which there was the garrison artillery. There were 56 battalions of infantry, 5 companies of cyclists (skiers), 3 regiments of cavalry (16 squadrons), 27 four-gun field batteries, 3 batteries of mountain artillery, 9 batteries of heavy artillery, and 1 regiment and 2 battalions of engineers. The new Flying Corps was organized in 3 divisions. The divisions were of unequal strength, according to the importance of the district in which they were recruited. In event of war, each division would mobilize 2 or 3 regiments of infantry (of 3 battalions), 3 or 4 squadrons of cavalry, a battalion of field artillery (of 3 batteries), a battalion of heavy artillery, a sapper company, a telegraph company, a medical company and a company of train. Each regimental district also forms one battalion of landvern (of 6 companies), and the other arms would form landvern units in the same proportion. The total peace strength was 118,500 men and comprised 71,836 rifles, 228 field and 36 heavy guns. The additional numbers available on mobilization amount to 282,000 men.

The Norwegian infantry was armed with various models of the Norwegian-designed Krag–Jørgensen 6.5x55 rifles and carbines. The field artillery had Ehrhardt 7.5 cm Model 1901. The budget of the army for 1919–1920 was 1,940,000.

The divisions received in 1933 the task of establishing their own field manoeuvre brigade with the same number as the division.

=== World War I ===
With full Norwegian independence, legislation was passed strengthening the system introduced in 1885. Liability for military service was extended to 55 years of age and the period of training was lengthened to about five months. Additional localized regiments were created within a framework of six military districts, permitting more rapid mobilization of reservists. These precautions proved effective with the outbreak of World War I in 1914. The Norwegian military remained mobilized throughout the war, ensuring Norway's neutrality in conjunction with that of Denmark and Sweden. In 1911 the 5th Brigade was established as the Norwegian Army's district organization in Møre og Romsdal and Trøndelag. It was upgraded to the status of the 5th Division in 1916.

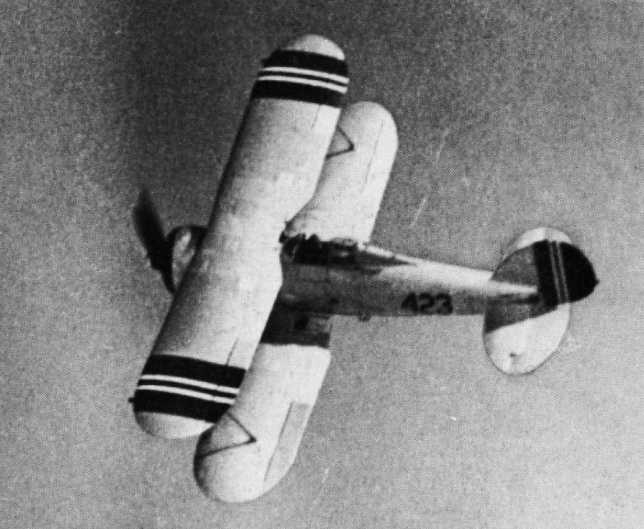
Gloster Gladiator of the Norwegian Army Air Service in 1940

=== World War II ===
Despite the escalating hostilities throughout Europe in 1939 and 1940, the Norwegian government at the time failed to mobilize; leaving the Army wholly unprepared for the German invasion of April 1940. The Norwegians were organised into six divisions/districts in April 1940. This amounted to approximately 19,000 men on paper. This was actually a numerically superior force to that of the Germans. However, these divisions were ill-prepared by the time the landings commenced and four were destroyed by the Germans during the initial phases of the campaign. With the German occupational forces in 1940, as with the other parts of the Armed Forces, the Army had to surrender to a superior force, but army units were the ones resisting for the longest period of time: The 6th Division led by the legendary Major General Carl Gustav Fleischer participated in the allied recapture of Narvik.

In most divisions, A force of 3 regiments (With 3,750 men in each regiment, 11,250 men in total) was the basic organization of the army. But with the 3rd and 4th Division, There was only 2 regiments (7,500 total men). Total Norwegian Division Force numbered 60,000 Men, in 16 Regiments. There was also a Few Extra Groups, like 3 Dragoon Regiments, 3 Artillery Regiments, a few Mountain artillery battalions and infantry battalions in the far north, with 2 Royal Guards companies in the south.

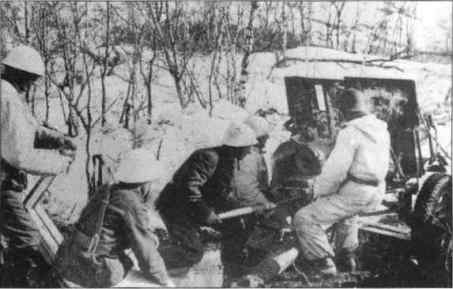
Model 1901 with modernized carriage in action at Narvik.

The greatest Norwegian accomplishment of the Second World War was the victory in the Battle of Narvik, especially the mountain war forcing the German forces all the way from the ocean to the Swedish border. In addition to the Norwegian Campaign, Norwegian soldiers joined the Norwegian resistance movement after German forces occupied Norway. The Home Front (Hjemmefronten) was the Norwegian resistance movement during Nazi Germany's occupation of Norway (1940–1945).

Norwegian soldiers also joined free Norwegian units in the United Kingdom to continue the fight against the Nazis from abroad. These units included the Norwegian Independent Company 1 and 5 Troop, No. 10 (Inter-Allied) Commando. The bulk of the Norwegian Army during the years in exile in Britain consisted of a brigade in Dumfries as well as smaller units stationed in Iceland, Jan Mayen, Svalbard and South Georgia. The 2nd Mountain Company operated in Finnmark from late 1944 under nominal Russian command. Norwegian police troops and units from this brigade took control over Finnmark in 1944 after the German retreat from the Red Army.

=== Cold War ===
The Army was reconstructed after the War, based among others on the forces Norwegian Brigade in Scotland and the Norwegian police troops in Sweden as well as on Milorg. The participation in the allied occupation of Germany with the Independent Norwegian Brigade Group in Germany was a very demanding task for the Army in the period of 1946–52, but it was also a part of the reconstruction. After the war the Army was structured to meet an invasion from the East. The Army was established in all parts of the country, from 1972 in five regional "divisions" to commemorate the divisions/districts of the Second World War: East (including District/Brigades 1, 3, 5 and 6, and 4 District/Brigade South, at battalion + strength), West (9 District/Brigade, 10 District/Brigade West), South (7 and 8 Dist/Brigades), Trondelag (11 District, 12, 13 Brigades/Districts), and 6th Division in North Norway. The first four divisions were divided into 12 regional districts, which could, after full mobilization, raise 11 combat brigades (10 mobilization-dependent). 6th Division controlled Brigade North in Tromsø, two brigade mobilization districts (which would have provided Brigades 14 and 15), and the Finnmark area with two garrisons. At the end of the Cold War the army could mobilise 13 brigades, although 10 of them were less well equipped.

=== Post Cold War ===
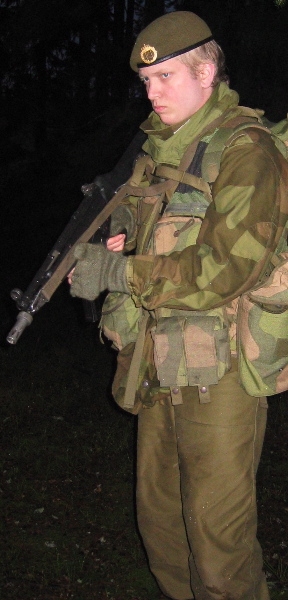
Soldier in kit armed with MP5, 2003

This picture definitely changed with the fall of the Berlin Wall in 1989 and the subsequent break-up of the Soviet Union and the Warsaw Pact.

It has been downsized after the end of the Cold War, with the biggest changes taking place in the middle of the 1990s, when a number of garrisons and units were discontinued. This restructuring focused on moving from a fairly static invasion army to a flexible rapid reaction army. The Parliament in 1994 and 1995 approved a series of major organizational changes, for the Army in particular. To ensure a cost-efficient implementation, it is necessary to focus the activities in the Army on the process of transforming the army from a large mobilization army to a smaller, professional army.

The 2005–08 plan envisaged reduction of the then army from three to two brigades, but the essential and key formation was to be Brigade North. The 6 Division Command was to be organised as a mobile tactical headquarters with the capability to serve as a framework for a headquarters for multinational operations above brigade level in Norway. But to keep Brigade North operational Jane's Defence Weekly was told in May 2004 would require two brigade sets of equipment. The Army had by the end of the decade been significantly downsized from its late Cold War heights, and has for example faced criticism from within claiming that it would now only be able to defend one district of Oslo in the event of a national invasion.

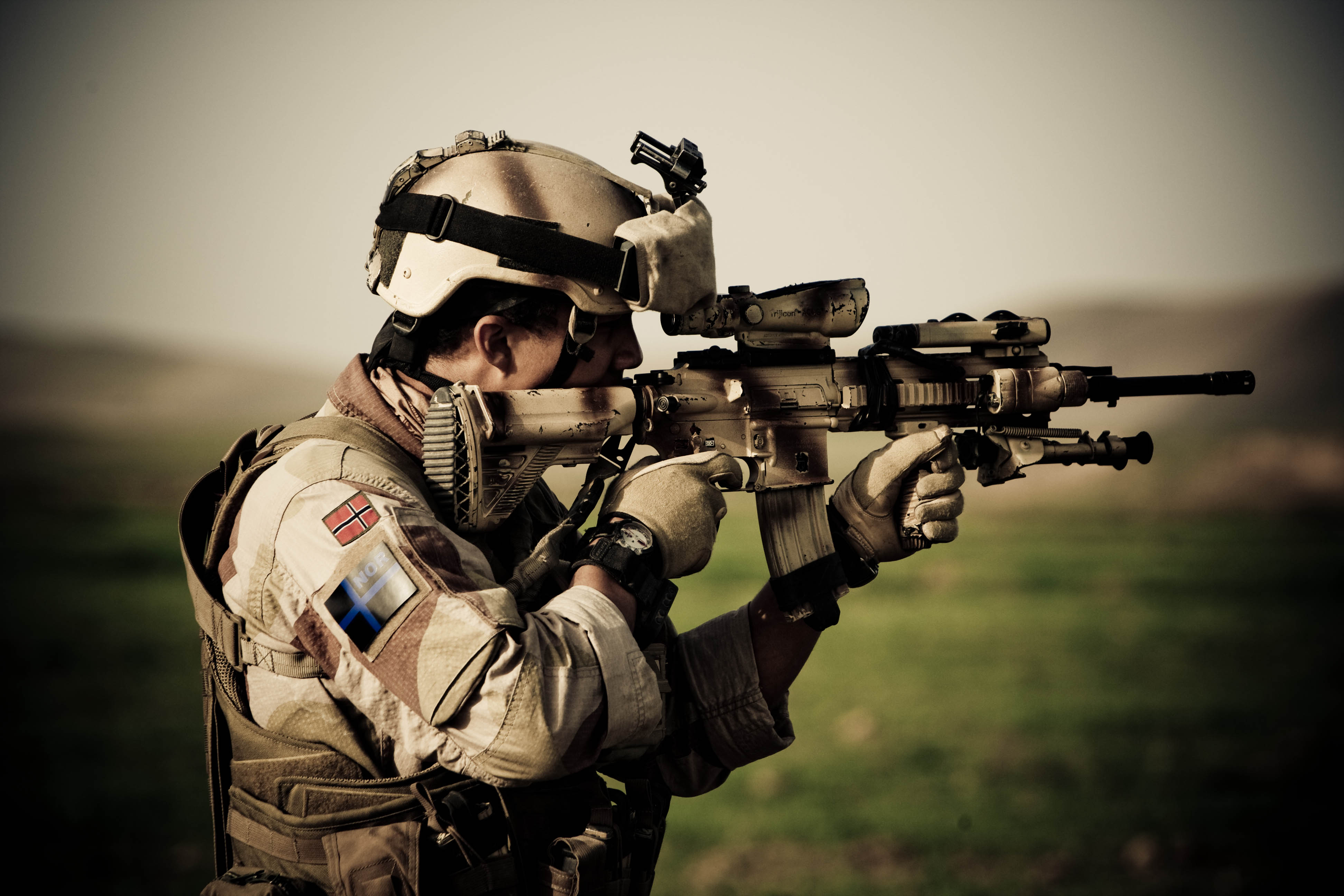
Norwegian soldier in Faryab province, Afghanistan, armed with an HK416 rifle.

Norwegian contributions to international crisis management have been generated from a system that is first and foremost geared towards the rapid activation of mobilization units armed and trained for territorial defence. As a consequence, Norwegian contributions to international military operations have a high degree of sustainability, as they have a substantial number of reserve units on which to draw. However, without adaptation this force posture is to a lesser extent able to generate forces rapidly and flexibly in response to international crises. Moreover, the contributions that Norway has been able to make to international operations have tended to consist of lightly armoured mechanized infantry, well-suited for more traditional peacekeeping tasks (UNIFIL in southern Lebanon to which Norway contributed a sizable unit for over twenty years) but not sufficiently robust for missions which might entail enforcement tasks.

=== War in Afghanistan ===
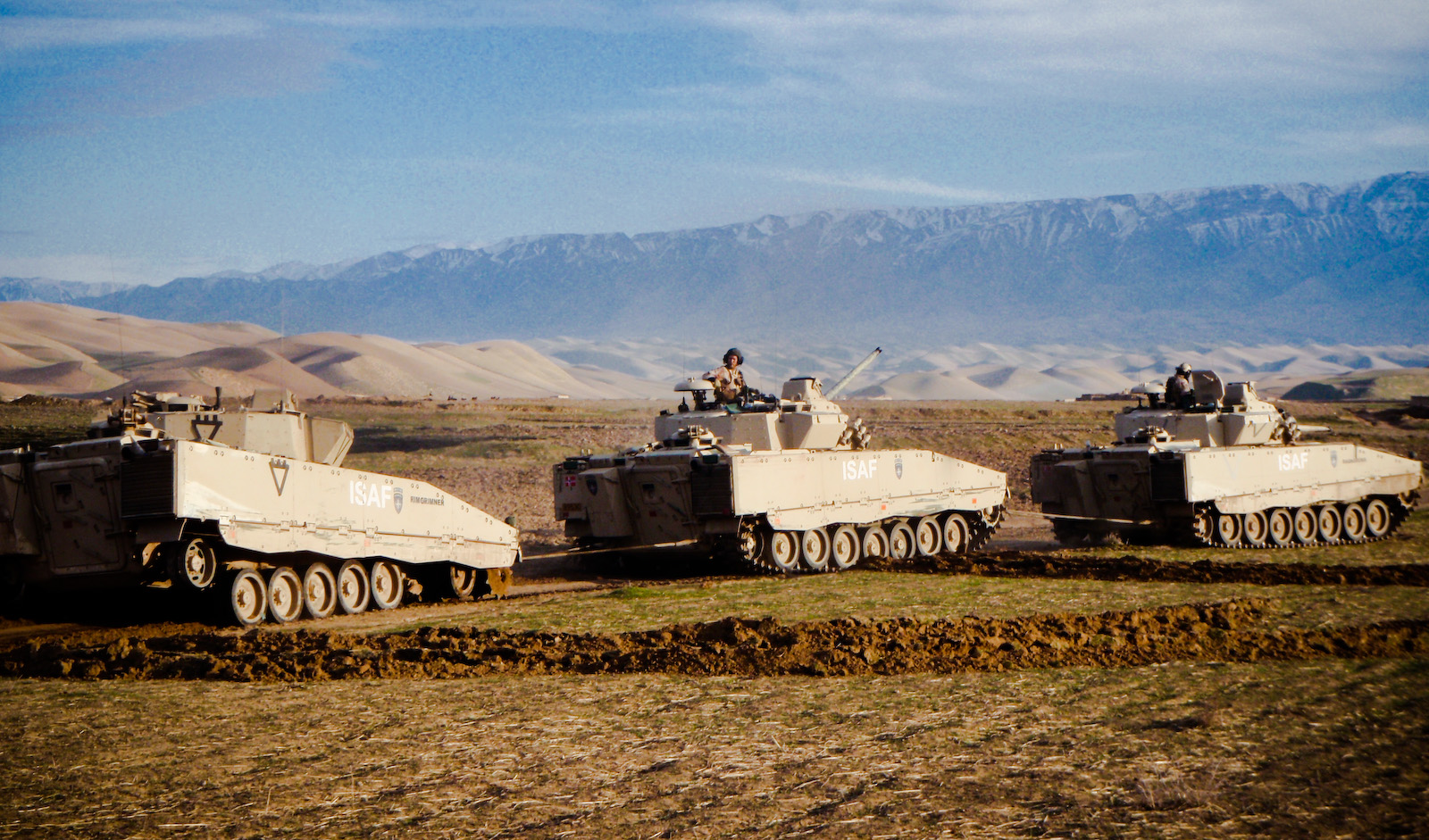
CV90's from the Norwegian Army in Afghanistan

Norway along with other Scandinavian countries, supported the US war on terror. The Norwegian government was one of the strongest supporters of the war.

Norwegian Defence Minister at the time, Bjørn Tore Godal, said "the United States is Norway's most important ally. Norway is already providing intelligence assistance to the United States. If we receive a request for further support, including military support, we will, of course, respond positively, and in accordance with the obligations of article 5 of the NATO treaty."

The Norwegian Army sent troops to support the NATO ISAF mission in Afghanistan, to help free Afghanistan of the Taliban. Norwegian special forces were involved in combat operations during Operation Enduring Freedom in 2002, and Norwegian Army troops during Operation Harekate Yolo in 2007. About 590 Norwegians were serving in the ISAF force in 2009.

According to Aftenposten, the Norwegian Army base at Meymaneh was amongst the least secure bases in Afghanistan at one point. Meymaneh is located in northwestern Afghanistan, which has become increasingly restless in recent years. Both the military and political heads of the armed forces agreed about the weakened state of the base. When the Norwegian Army was asked what they needed to defend their position, they asked for 120 troops and long-range weapons. They also requested a mobile reaction force, so that allies in the region could assist each other if they came under heavy attack.

== Organization ==
Combat formations of the Norwegian Army

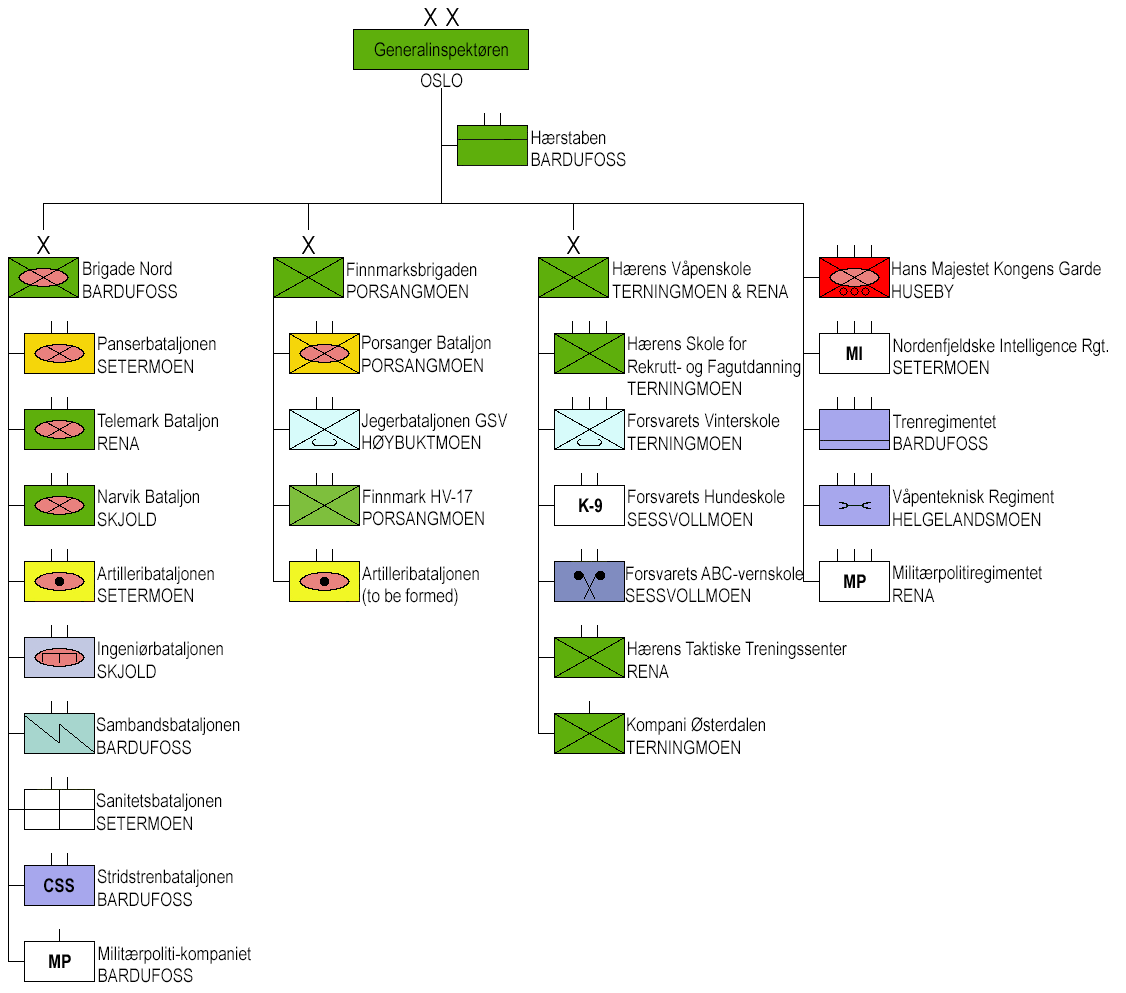
Norwegian Army organization as of November 2026

In 2009 the Army introduced the new command and control lines. The Chief of the Army (former General Inspector) now commands three subordinate operational units and five support units:

- Army Staff, in Bardufoss
  - Brigade Nord, in Bardufoss
  - Finnmark Brigade, in Porsanger
  - Hans Majestet Kongens Garde, in Oslo
  - Nordenfjeldske Intelligence Regiment, in Setermoen
  - Logistic Regiment, in Bardufoss
  - Weapons Technical Regiment, in Helgelandsmoen
  - Military Police Regiment, in Sessvollmoen
  - Land Warfare Centre, in Rena and Terningmoen

=== Hans Majestets Kongens Garde (Garden) ===
Hans Majestet Kongens Garde is a light infantry regiment based in Oslo at Huseby camp. The main task of Garden is to protect the King and the royal family in peace, crisis and war.

After the terrorist attack in 2011, the unit also functions as a defence force in Norway’s capital Oslo and will assist the police when needed.

=== Brigade Nord ===
Brigade Nord is one of the Norwegian Army's combat brigades. The brigade is formed primarily around three all-arms battlegroups.

=== Brigade South ===
Brigade South is a light reserve brigade, which is being raised from 2025 and planned to be fully operational by 2036.

=== Finnmark Brigade ===
The Finnmark Brigade (Finnmarksbrigaden) is responsible for safeguarding Norway's northernmost territories and the land border with Russia. The brigade formally replaced the former Finnmark Land Command (Finnmark Landforsvar) when it was disbanded 20 August 2025.

The Finnmark Brigade is planned as a fully fledged combat brigade with light infantry, artillery with air-defence elements, engineers, intelligence and support units. According to the government’s long-term defence plan, the brigade is to reach a high level of operational capability by 2032.

- Finnmark Brigade HQ (Finnmarksbrigaden), in Porsangmoen
  - Porsanger Battalion (Porsanger Bataljon), cavalry battalion in Porsangmoen with a K9 Thunder battery
  - Ranger Battalion GSV (Jegerbataljonen GSV), infantry battalion at Høybuktmoen guarding the Norway–Russia border
  - 17th Home Guard District Finnmark (Finnmark Heimevernsdistrikt 17), at Porsangmoen

=== 2024 Long-term Defence Plan ===
According to the 2024 Norwegian Long-term Defence Plan for the period 2025–2036, the army is set to grow from one to three brigades. Brigade North is to be developed into a heavy infantry brigade with four mechanised manoeuvre battalions and associated support units. Finnmark land defence will be strengthened with combat air defence, an artillery battalion, one light infantry battalion, engineer company, ISTAR squadron, strengthened leadership, and developed into the Finnmark Brigade. Brigade South will be established as a reservist-based light infantry brigade to secure allied reception areas and act as a mobile reaction force. Long-range precision fires will be added to the Army and the Air Force will be supplied with new helicopters to support the Army and special forces.

== Uniforms ==
Norwegian army field uniforms are mainly two different uniforms: M17, a lightweight field uniform for general use, both in garrison and in field. And M02: A field uniform with breathable membrane, which provides protection against moisture and wind. Service uniform M10 is used as ceremonial dress and service dress; blue full dress uniform as ceremonial dress and mess dress. Blue full dress uniforms are used by professional soldiers.

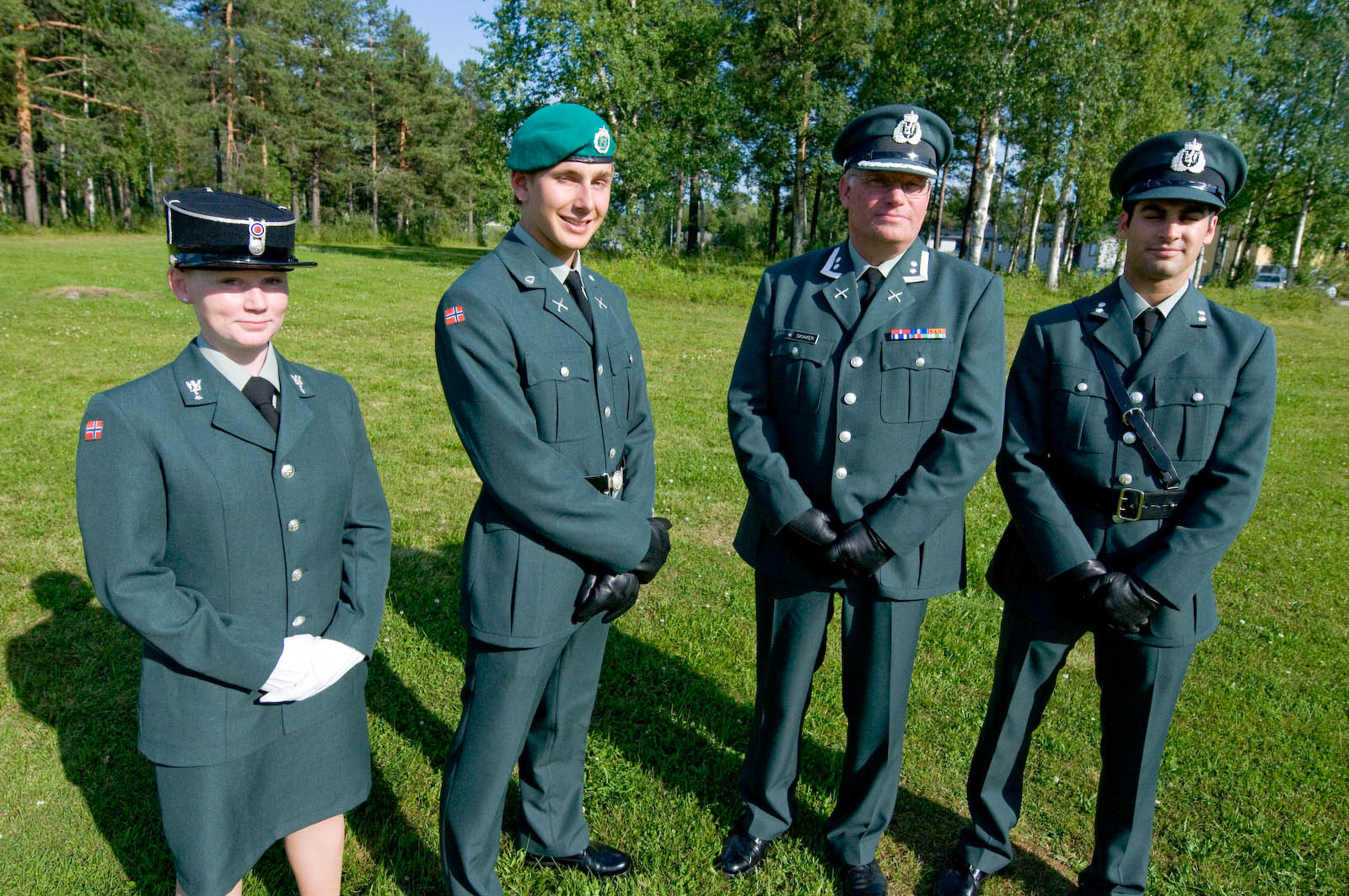
Mountain gray service uniform M10.

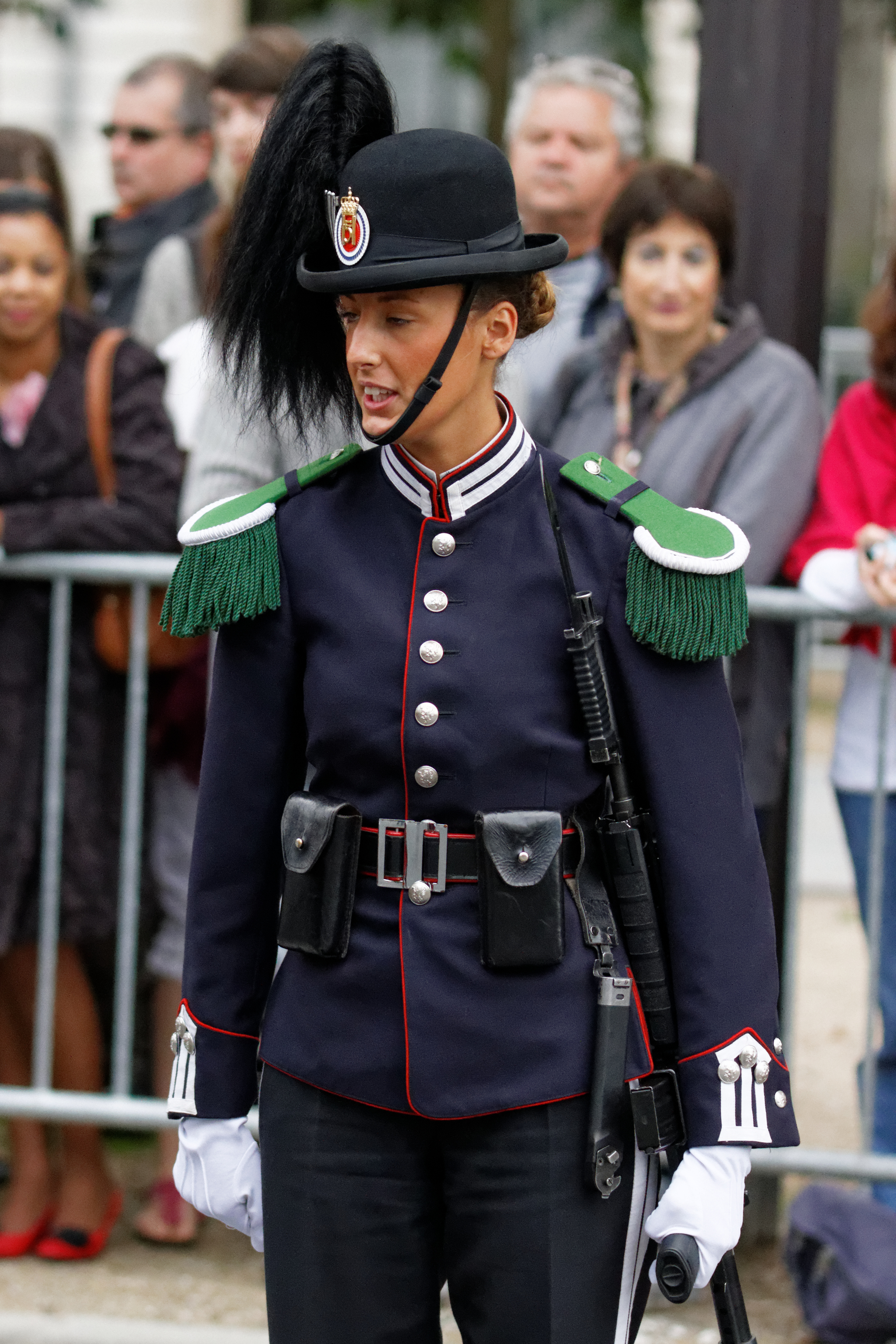
H.M. Guards full dress uniform.

The goal of the Nordic Combat Uniform Project is to procure a common, flexible combat uniform system for the countries Finland, Sweden, Norway and Denmark. Although the uniform will be the same in the four Nordic countries, the uniforms will look different because the countries will use their own camouflage patterns.

== Ranks and rank insignia ==
NATO code	OF-10	OF-9	OF-8	OF-7	OF-6	OF-5	OF-4	OF-3	OF-2	OF-1
Norwegian Army
Norwegian Army		General	Generalløytnant	Generalmajor	Brigader	Oberst	Oberstløytnant	Major	Kaptein/ Rittmester	Løytnant	Fenrik

NATO code	OR-9	OR-8	OR-7	OR-6	OR-5		OR-4	OR-3	OR-2	OR-1
Norwegian Army
Norwegian Army	Sersjantmajor	Kommandérsersjant	Stabssersjant	Oversersjant	Sersjant 1. klasse	Sersjant	Korporal	Visekorporal 1. klasse	Visekorporal	Ledende menig	Menig

== Garrisons ==
Garrisons	Brigades / Companies
Jørstadmoen	FK KKIS(Defence command and control center) CIS TG (Communications and informations systems task group) CIS (Cyber defence academy) FOST (Defence security agency)
Huseby Leir	HMKG (His Majesty The King's guard)
Rena Leir	Hærens Våpenskole (Army weapons school) Telemark Battalion and attached medical, engineer and logistics companies provided by respective battalions. Forsvarets Spesialkommando (Norwegian Special Operations Command)
Terningmoen leir	Hærens Våpenskole (Army weapons school) HMKG school center (His Majesty The King's guard) Military Academy AFA-Office (Administrative parental department)
Sessvollmoen	FKL (Logistics support center) FMPS (Defence military police school), FSAN (Defence medical center)
Skjold	Brigade Nord Engineer battalion and 2. battalion
Setermoen	Brigade Nord Armor battalion, Intelligence battalion, Medical battalion and Artillery battalion
Bardufoss	Brigade Nord Signals battalion and CSS battalion
Porsangermoen	Garrison of Porsanger
Høybuktmoen	Ranger Battalion GSV
Linderud Leir	Military Academy
