= Jarfjorden =

Fjord in Norway

- Ruovdevuotna (Northern Sami)
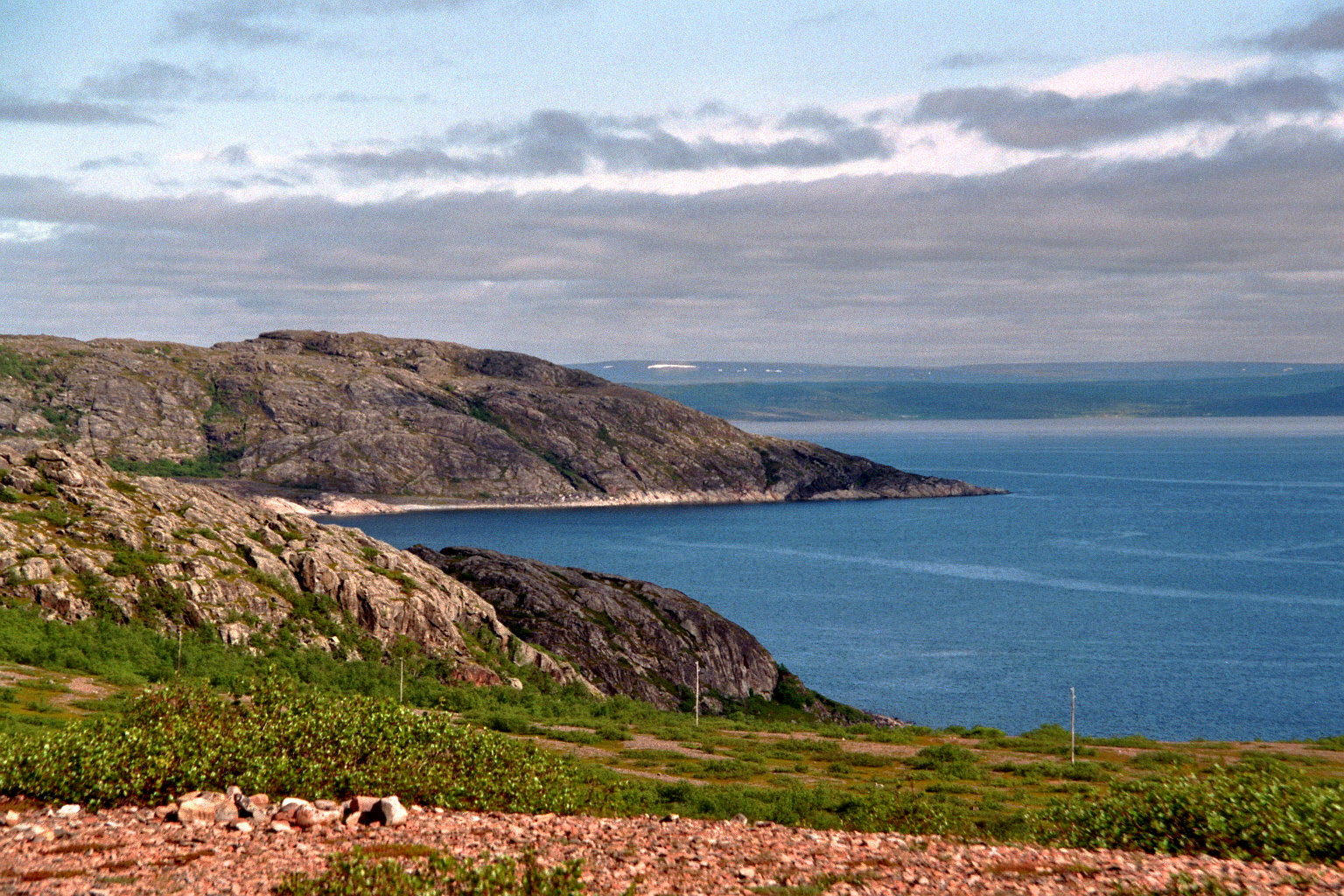
- Jarfjorden seen from N886, 6 July 2012

- Location in Finnmark
- Location: Sør-Varanger Municipality, Finnmark
- Coordinates: 69°42′53″N 30°25′30″E
- Basin countries: Norway
- Max. length: 21 kilometres (13 mi)
- Max. depth: 214 metres (702 ft)
- Settlements: Lanabukt, Storbukt, Tårnet

Jarfjorden (Northern Sami: Ruovdevuotna) is a fjord on Varanger Fjord in Sør-Varanger Municipality in Finnmark county, Norway. The fjord stretches 21 kilometres (13 mi) south to Jarfjordbotn.

The fjord inlet is between Oterneset in the west and Rundskjeret in the east. Just inside the entrance is Litle Jarfjorden almost parallel to Jarfjorden on the east side. There are few human settlements up the fjord, such as Lanabukt on the east side, and further south there are the villages of Storbukt and Tårnet. Here the fjord turns almost ninety degrees to the west into the last section to Jarfjordbotn.

When navigating into Jarfjorden, it is advised to travel nearer the west side. The best place to anchor in Jarfjorden is at Lanabukt, where the water is 20 to 24 metres deep, and where a floating wharf is now in place, thanks to the Sea Salmon Fishermen's Association (Sjølaksefiskarlaget) with Sami support. There is a small uninhabited island called Hinnøya in Jarfjorden, close to Lanabukt. King eider and Steller's eider can be seen on Jarfjorden near Lanabukt during the winter.

Small vessels can alternatively anchor off Jarfjordbotn near the head of the fjord, where the depth is up to 22 metres.

Norwegian National Road 886 runs along the south side of the fjord. Norway's oldest bedrock, Jarfjordgneis, migmatitic gneiss, which is 2900 million years old, is located by the fjord. It dates from the Precambrian period.
