= Nordenfjeldske Intelligence Regiment =

- Nordenfjeldske etterretningsregiment
- Founded: 2002
- Allegiance: Norway
- Branch: Norwegian Army
- Size: Ca. 200
- Garrison/HQ: Setermoen
- Motto(s): Ordo ab chao
- Engagements: Operation Inherent Resolve, War in Afghanistan
- Website: https://www.forsvaret.no/jobb/jobb-i-etterretningsregimentet#:~:text=I%20Etterretningsregimentet%20kan%20du%20jobbe,p%C3%A5%20Setermoen%20i%20indre%20Troms

Insignia
- Standard

Nordenfjeldske Intelligence Regiment (Norwegian: Nordenfjeldske etterretningsregiment) is a regiment within the Norwegian Army responsible for military intelligence, surveillance, and reconnaissance operations. The regiment is based at Setermoen Camp in Inner Troms and has approximately 200 personnel. While the unit mainly consists of enlisted soldiers, a new program introduced in 2019 allows conscripted candidates to compete for positions as intelligence analysts.

== History ==
The regiment traces its roots to the intelligence environment of the former Brigade in Northern Norway (Brig N), particularly through the Bicycle Reconnaissance Platoon and, from 1961, the Reconnaissance Squadron. In 2002, the unit was reestablished under the 6th Division Command as the Intelligence Battalion. On April 24, 2025, it was expanded into a regiment and renamed Nordenfjeldske etterretningsregiment.

== Mission ==
The main mission of the unit is to educate, train, and exercise qualified intelligence personnel to fulfill its core task: Delivering up-to-date situational awareness to the Army’s leadership—and, through it, to the broader Norwegian Armed Forces—for planning and conducting operations. This intelligence is also made available to civilian decision-makers.

The regiment gathers, processes, and analyzes information using a variety of methods, including sensor deployment and human intelligence collection. One key method involves long-range reconnaissance patrols—small, specialized units that often operate deep behind enemy lines or outside friendly-controlled areas.

== Organisation ==
- Regiment Command
- Production and Analysis Section
- Long-range Reconnaissance Squadron
- Intelligence and Security Squadron
- UAV Squadron
- Support Squadron
- Electronic Warfare Company

All these units collect information about an enemy, civilian activity, or other matters of interest in the given situation. Each unit operates within its specialized field and has different methods of performing its tasks. Personnel from the Intelligence Regiment can, like other soldiers, volunteer for international service.

== Mapping of Norwegian journalists ==
In 2013, Norwegian Parliamentary Intelligence Oversight Committee, during an unannounced inspection, uncovered that the Intelligence Battalion had been mapping Norwegian journalists. The reason for this was that the Norwegian newspaper Verdens Gang had exposed the secret intelligence group E 14.

In September 2014, the Norwegian Data Protection Authority concluded that the battalion's registrations violated the Personal Data Act, and imposed a fine of 75,000 NOK on the Norwegian Armed Forces for infringing on the journalists' right to privacy.
