= Porsanger Battalion =

- Active: 1 May 2020 - Present
- Country: Norway
- Branch: Norwegian Army
- Type: Mechanised infantry
- Role: Armoured reconnaissance
- Size: One battalion
- Part of: Finnmark Brigade
- Garrison/HQ: Garrison of Porsanger
- Mottos: "Where wolf's ears are, wolf's teeth are near" from the Völsunga saga
- Equipment: Combat Vehicle 90
- Website: https://www.forsvaret.no/om-forsvaret/organisasjon/haeren/finnmark-landforsvar

Commanders
- Current commander: Lt.Col. Espen Stiberg

Insignia
- Standard

The Porsanger Battalion is an armoured reconnaissance unit of the Norwegian Army. The battalion is based in Garrison of Porsanger, as part of the Finnmark Land Command.

== History ==
The Battalion was established May 1st 2020.

== Current organisation ==
Porsanger Battalion is broken into the following structure

- Battalion Headquarters based at Garrison of Porsanger
  - 1st Armoured Reconnaissance Squadron
  - 2nd Armoured Reconnaissance Squadron
  - 6th Combat Support Squadron
