= Høybuktmoen =

Høybuktmoen (Norwegian); Nuovusguolbba (Northern Sami)
- Airport / Military Camp
- Location of Høybuktmoen Høybuktmoen (Norway)
- Coordinates: 69°43′03″N 29°53′33″E
- Country: Norway
- Region: Northern Norway
- County: Finnmark
- District: Øst-Finnmark
- Municipality: Sør-Varanger Municipality
- Elevation: 90 m (300 ft)
- Time zone: UTC+01:00 (CET)
  - Summer (DST): UTC+02:00 (CEST)

Høybuktmoen (Norwegian) or Nuovusguolbba (Northern Sami) is a moorland area in Sør-Varanger Municipality in Finnmark county, Norway. It is located about 12 kilometers (7.5 mi) west of the town of Kirkenes. It is the site of Kirkenes Airport, Høybuktmoen and the Garrison of Sør-Varanger. Høybuktmoen is located on a small peninsula between the Bøkfjorden and Korsfjorden. The European route E6 highway runs just south of Høybuktmoen.

== See also ==
- Nazi concentration camps in Norway
