= Ranger Battalion GSV =

Coordinates: 69.725781°N 029.891294°E

- Active: 1921–present
- Country: Norway
- Branch: Army
- Type: Border guard Light infantry
- Role: Border control Reconnaissance; Cold-weather warfare
- Size: Battalion (Note: 600 conscripts and 100 enlisted personnel)
- Part of: Finnmark Brigade
- Garrison/HQ: Høybuktmoen
- Motto: Alltid klar (Always ready)
- Colours: Black and yellow shoulder cord Umbra green beret
- Mascot: Vargen (the wolf)

Commanders
- Current commander: Lieutenant colonel Jørn Qviller
- Commander-in-Chief: Haakon VIII

Insignia
- Standard

Ranger Battalion GSV (Norwegian: Jegerbataljonen GSV, formerly known as the Garrison of Sør-Varanger) is a border guard light infantry battalion unit in the Norwegian Army that monitors the 196-kilometer (122 mi) border between Norway and Russia. It is located at Høybuktmoen in Sør-Varanger Municipality in Finnmark county, Norway.

The military base sits adjacent to Kirkenes Airport, Høybuktmoen. The battalion consists of the Training Company (UTDKP), the Combat Support Company (KAMPSTØ), the Ranger Company (JGKP), and the border companies: the Jarfjord Ranger Company (JAR) and the Pasvik Ranger Company (PAS).

== Mission ==
=== Two-part main mission ===
The Ranger Battalion GSV has a twofold main mission: A military and a non-military one. Both assignments are linked to 24/7 monitoring of the Norwegian-Russian border.

- The military mission is to protect Norway's sovereignty, by safeguarding Norway's interests in the border area through presence, monitoring and reporting, and thereby form part of the military defense of Finnmark and Norway.
- The civilian task is to monitor that the border agreement concluded in 1949 between Norway and the Soviet Union is complied with. The assignment also includes monitoring the Schengen area's outer border in the north, to prevent violations of the Border Act and Border Regulations. The border ranger act partly on behalf of the chief of police in the Finnmark Police District. They can thus take care of certain tasks that the police usually have, and consequently has limited police authority.

== Service at GSV ==
The troops stationed at GSV mainly consists of conscripted soldiers. Most of the soldiers are men, but there is also an increasing number of women represented. GSV receives about 400 new conscripts every six months.

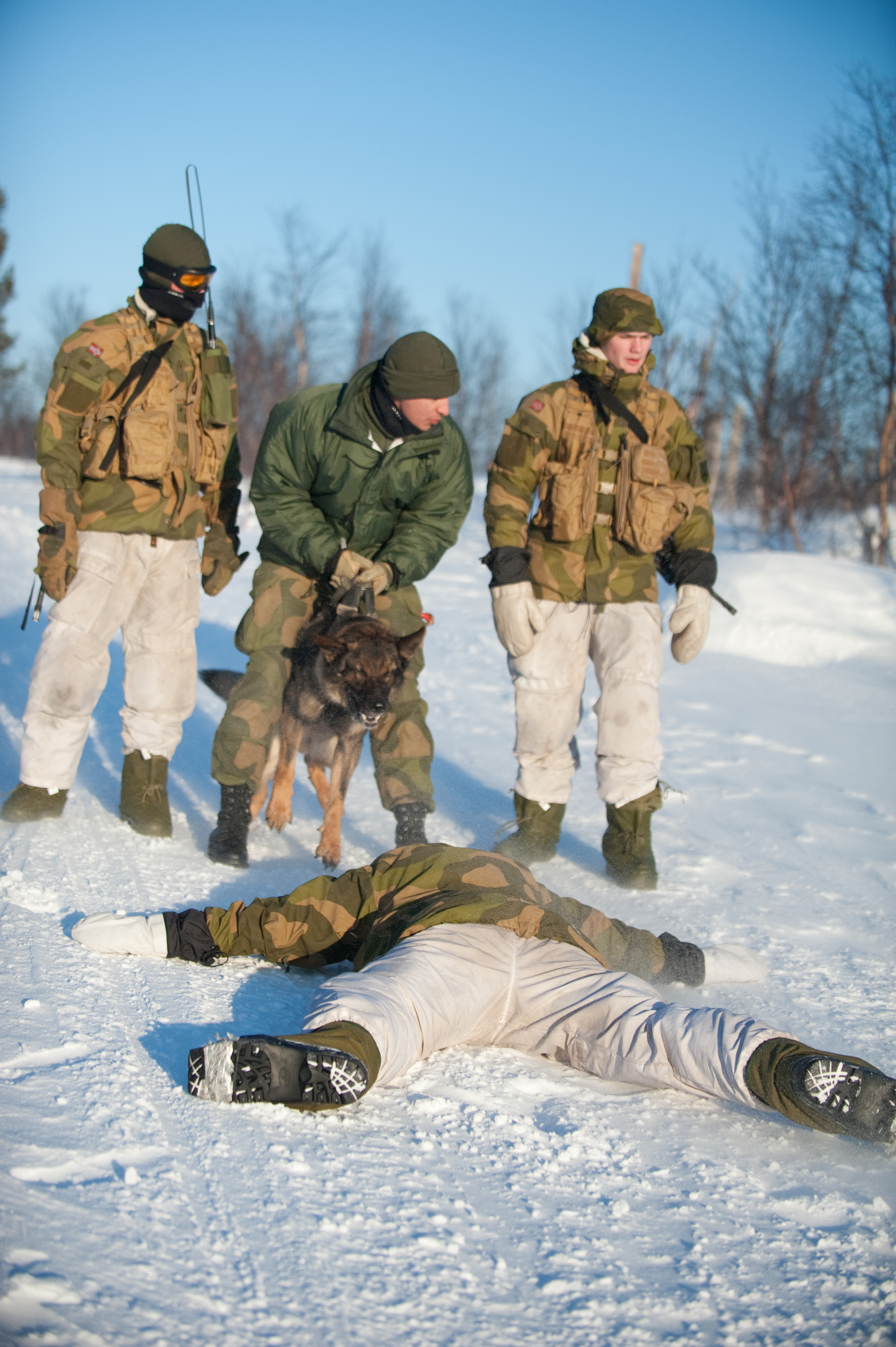
Personnel simulating an arrest

The first seven weeks of recruit training, which is standard for all military personnel in Norway. After basic training, some of the soldiers are transferred to the garrison company to work in and around the garrison to support the education of the UTDKP, the border companies themselves and the mission-solvance of the GSV border companies.

The rest of the soldiers stay in the education company to become border guards. After six months, through basic training, advanced training and specialist/designated training, the soldiers are divided up and sent to one of the two border stations.

The border service requires physical and mental stamina, discipline and the ability to think, decide and initiate. The service requires individuals and units to operate independently. The soldiers deployed for border service are basically trained as reconnaissance rangers. Most of the time in the education company consist of field exercise, fire drills and role specialisation.

At the border, the soldiers are divided into four-person patrol teams. A typical patrol team consist of one patrol commander, one communications technician, one medical specialist and one scout. Not assigned, but perfectly available for the teams are canine conscripts, responsible for handling and training the patrol canines, and transportation conscripts, responsible for mobility, administrative tasks and maintenance. In addition, a portion of the border guards are assigned with a dual role; reconnaissance and operations headquarters, they also serve as regular border guards.

The soldiers' main task is to function as border guards on the Russian border, guarding not only the border to a neighbouring country, but also the European border according to the Schengen Agreement. The new Ranger Company (JGKP) have anti-mobility (anti-tank) weapons like the Javelin missile system, and also deploy AT mines.

== Agencies performing border enforcement ==
Treaty and sovereignty enforcement of the Norwegian border to Russia is a three-agency operation.

- Finnmark Police District: Responsible for prosecution, fines, and processing of illegal immigrants, asylum seekers, and border violations.
- Norwegian Border Commission: The policy-making and diplomatic department. It arranges contact and meetings with its Russian counterpart, makes agreements and rules, and is a substantial part of the diplomatic process.
- Ranger Battalion GSV: Responsible of military border patrol.

== Border stations ==
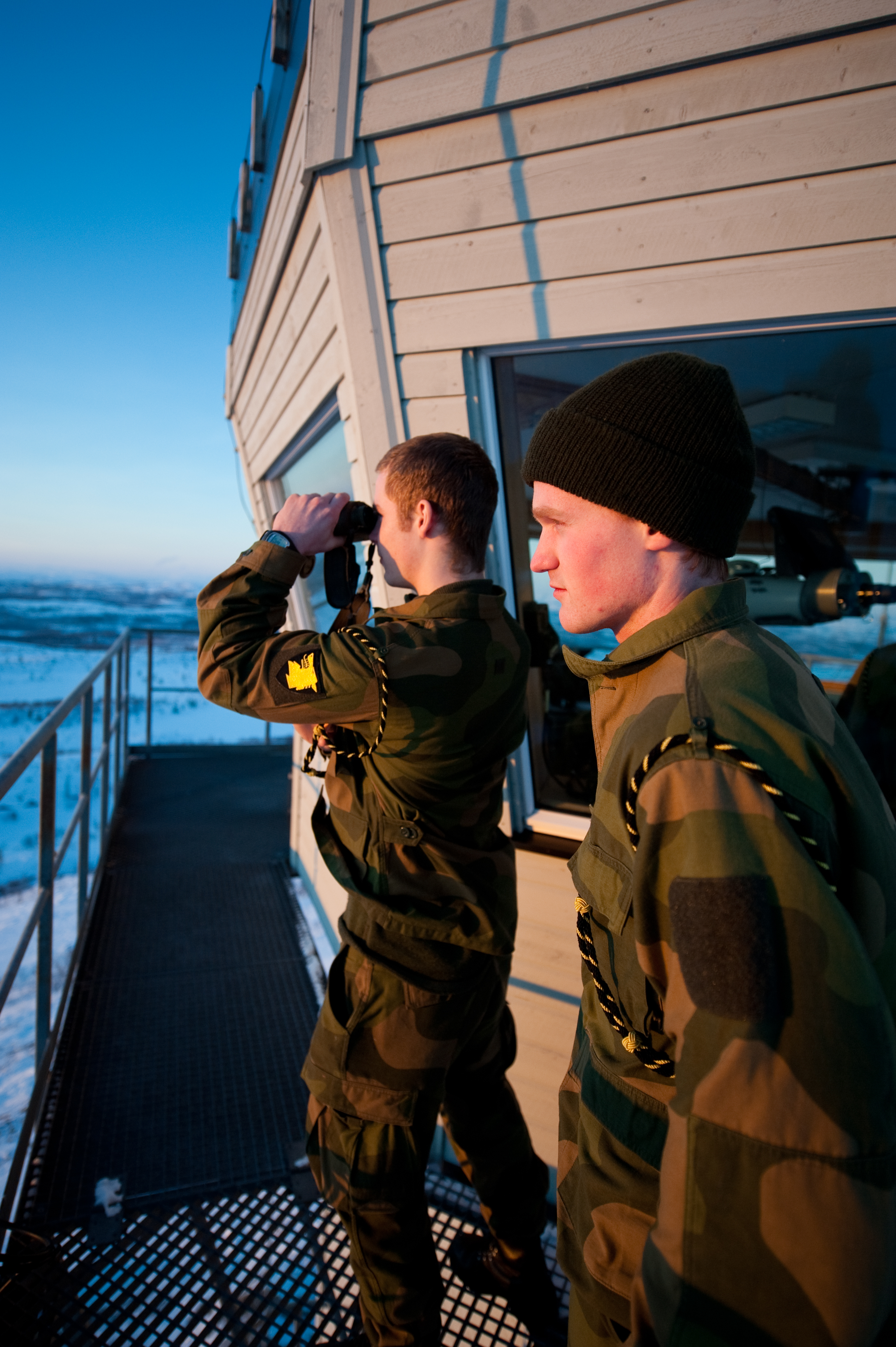
Conscripts working at a border outpost

- Jarfjord
- Pasvik

In addition to the border stations, some soldiers also staff the checkpoint at Storskog, the only legal crossing point between Norway and Russia. The checkpoint is also staffed by the Finnmark Police District, the Norwegian Customs Service, and the Norwegian Border Commission.
