= Garrison of Porsanger =

The Garrison of Porsanger (Norwegian: Garnisonen i Porsanger), is a garrison based at Porsangmoen in Porsanger Municipality, in Finnmark county, Norway. It is located about 18 kilometres (11 mi) from the village of Lakselv. The garrison is located immediately adjacent to Halkavarre, the largest military training area in Norway.

Until 2011, it trained and housed the jegerkompani / ISTAR, formerly a part of the Finnmark regiment, together with Garnisonen i Sør-Varanger and Alta Battalion, as well as a petty officer's training centre for the Home Guard. Since 2019, it has housed the HQ of Finnmark Land Command as well as Porsanger Battalion.
