= Finnmark =

County in Northern Norway

Finnmark County Finnmark fylke Finnmárkku fylka Finmarkun fylkki
- County
- Finmarkens amt (historic name)
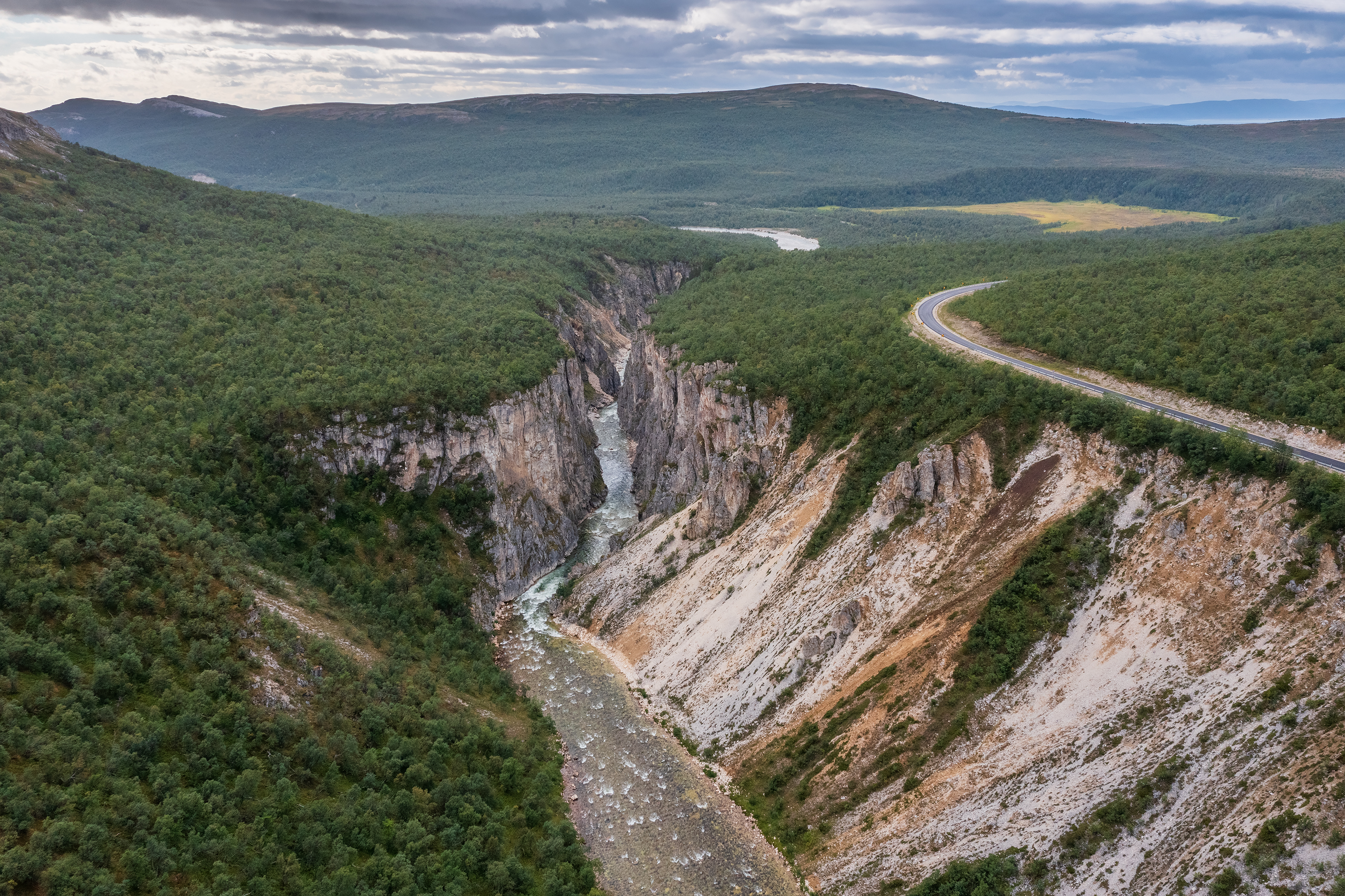
- Silfar canyon in Porsanger Municipality

- Flag Coat of arms

- Finnmark within Norway
- Coordinates: 70°N 25°E
- Country: Norway
- County: Finnmark
- District: Northern Norway
- Established: 1576
- Re-established: 1 January 2024
  - Preceded by: Troms og Finnmark county (2020 to end of 2023)
- Administrative centre: Vadsø

Government
  - Body: Finnmark County Municipality
  - Governor: Elisabeth Aspaker (H)
  - County mayor: Hans-Jacob Bønå (H)

Area
  - Total: 48,618 km^{2} (18,772 sq mi)
  - Land: 45,757 km^{2} (17,667 sq mi)
  - Water: 2,861 km^{2} (1,105 sq mi) 5.9%
  - Rank: #2 in Norway

Population (30 September 2019)
  - Total: 75,540
  - Rank: #18 in Norway
  - Density: 1.55/km^{2} (4.0/sq mi)
  - Change (10 years): ▲ +2.73%
- Demonym: Finnmarking

Official languages
  - Norwegian form: Bokmål
  - Sámi form: Northern Sami
  - Other language: Kven
- Time zone: UTC+01:00 (CET)
  - Summer (DST): UTC+02:00 (CEST)
- ISO 3166 code: NO-56
- Income (per capita): 128,300 kr (2001)
- GDP (per capita): 185,563 kr (2001)
- GDP national rank: #18 in Norway (0.9% of country)
- Website: Official website

Finnmark (Note: Norwegian: [ˈfɪ̀nːmɑrk]; Northern Sami: Finnmárku [ˈfinːˌmaːrːhkuː]; Kven: Finmarkku; Finnish: Finnmarkin lääni; Russian: Финнмарк.) is a county in northern Norway. By land, it borders Troms county to the west, Finland's Lapland region to the south, and Russia's Murmansk Oblast to the east, and by water, the Norwegian Sea (Atlantic Ocean) to the northwest, and the Barents Sea (Arctic Ocean) to the north and northeast.

The county was formerly known as Finmarkens amt or Vardøhus amt. Since 2002, it has had two official names: Finnmark (Norwegian) and Finnmárku (Northern Sami). It is part of the Sápmi region, which spans four countries, as well as the Barents Region, and is Norway's second-largest and least populous county.

In January 2020, Finnmark merged with the neighbouring county of Troms to form Troms og Finnmark county. In January 2024, the counties of Finnmark and Troms were restored after parliament decided in June 2022 to separate them.

== Etymology ==
The name Finnmark is derived from Old Norse Finnmǫrk: The first element is finn(ar), the Norse name for the Sámi people, and the last element is mǫrk, which means "woodland" or "borderland". In Norse times the name referred to the land of the Sámi people, or any place where Sámi people lived.

== Coat of arms ==
The coat of arms is black with a gold-colored castle tower—its blazon reads, "Sable, a single-towered castle Or". The design is from 1967 and shows the old Vardøhus Fortress, historically on the eastern border with Russia.

== History ==
=== Sámi ===
The Sámi are the indigenous people of Finnmark, but Norwegians have lived for hundreds of years on the islands' outer parts, where they made up the majority. The Sámi people still constitute the majority in Finnmark's interior parts, while the fjord areas have been ethnically mixed for a long time. This essentially holds true today.

The Sámi were for years victims of the Norwegianization policy, which in essence was an attempt by the government to make them "true Norwegians" and forget about their Sámi way of life and religion, which was seen as inferior. As a result, the Sámi living at the coast and in the fjords gradually lost much of their culture and often felt ashamed of their Sámi heritage. The Sámi in the interior managed to preserve more of their culture. In the 1970s, instruction of the Sámi language started in schools, and a new sense of consciousness started to grow among the Sámi; today most are proud of their background and culture.

In the midst of this awakening (1979), Norway's government decided to build a dam in Alta to produce hydropower, provoking multiple Sámi and environmentalists to demonstrations and civil disobedience—Alta conflict. In the end, the dam was built on a much smaller scale than originally intended and the Sámi culture was on the government's agenda. The Sámi parliament (Sámediggi) was opened in Karasjok in 1989.

=== Norwegian ===
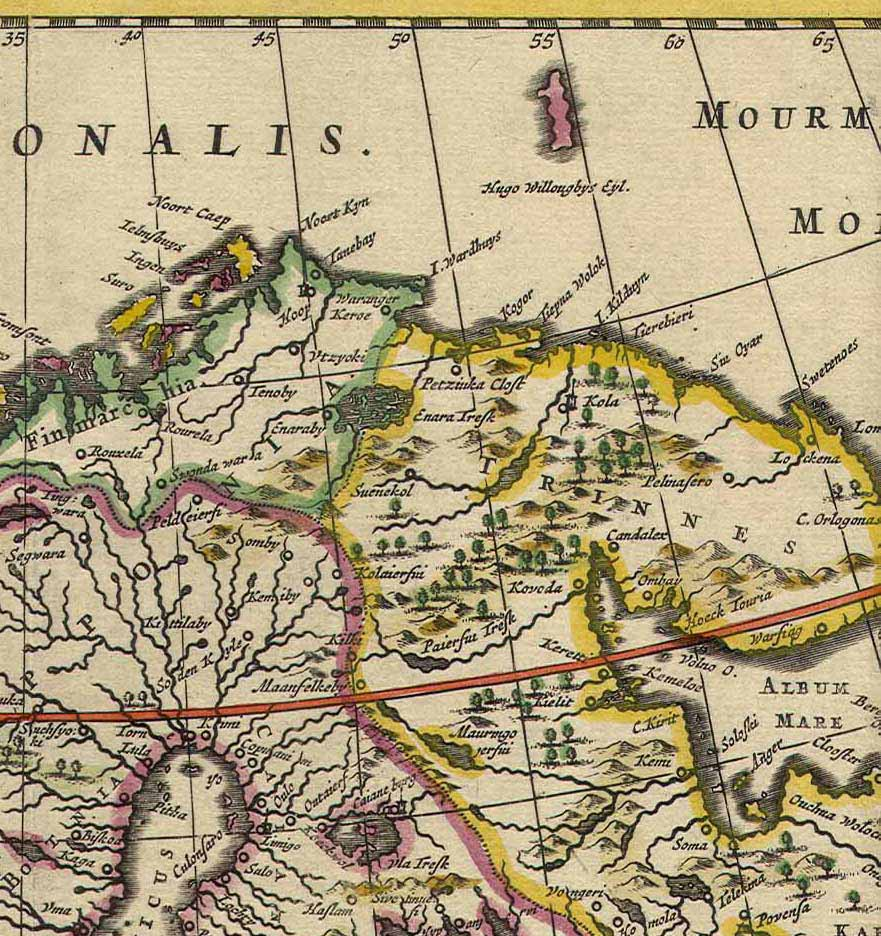
A 1660 Dutch map of Finnmark, showing the border between Norway, Sweden and Russia.

Gjesvær in Nordkapp is mentioned in the Sagas (Heimskringla) as a northern harbor in the Viking Age, especially used by Vikings on the way to Bjarmaland (see Ottar from Hålogaland), and probably also for gathering food in the nearby seabird colony. Coastal areas of Finnmark were colonized by Norwegians beginning in the 10th century, and there are stories describing clashes with the Karelians.

Norwegian expansion at the turn of the 13th century led to competition between Norway and the Russian city-state of Novgorod over control of the region, particularly in the collection of taxes from the Sámi. Border skirmishes between the Norwegians and Novgorodians continued until 1326, when the Treaty of Novgorod settled the issue. In addition, an undated note from the 1330s delineated the border and mentions the presence of border markers, which allegedly specifies a common region for taxation, allowing both parties to collect taxes from the Sámi.

The first known fortification in Finnmark is Vardøhus festning, first erected in 1306 by King Haakon V Magnusson. This is the world's most northern fortress. In the 17th century, 88 young women were burned as witches in Vardø, an extremely high number compared to the total population in this area at the time. The first person burned as witch in Vardø in the 17th century was a man. [Vardø archives]

Finnmark first became subject to increased colonization in the 18th and 19th century. Norway, Sweden, and Russia all claimed control over this area. Finland was part of Russia at that time and had no independent representative. Finnmark was given the status of an Amt (county) in the 19th century. For a time, there was a vibrant trade with Russia (Pomor trade), and a number of Norwegians settled on the Kola Peninsula (see Kola Norwegians).

=== Kven ===
The Finnic Kven residents of Finnmark are largely descendants of Finnish-speaking immigrants who arrived in the area in the 18th century from Torne Valley, and later in the 19th century from Finland, suffering from famine and war.

=== Brief summary ===
In 1576, the King of Norway established Vardøhus len as a new administrative unit for most northern part of the kingdom. In 1660, it became Vardøhus amt, a subordinate to the large Trondhjems stiftamt, based in Trondheim. In 1787, the island of Senja and the Troms area were transferred from Nordlandenes amt to Vardøhus amt. In 1866, the island of Senja and the Troms area were separated from Vardøhus to form the new Tromsø amt. In 1919, the name was again changed to Finnmark fylke. In 2002, the Sami language name, Finnmárku, was added as a co-official name for the county.

Per Fugelli has said that World War II resulted in many persons acquiring psychiatric disorders (psykiske senskadene) which could be from experiencing "bombing, accidents involving mines, burning down of homes, forcible evacuation, illness and starvation during the war and liberation. But it was maybe in particular the treatment of Russian prisoners that left marks on the local population."

=== World War II ===
Around 120,000 German forces occupied the area from the summer of 1940 onwards. In 1945, the Germans put into force Operation Nordlicht, and used a scorched earth tactic in Finnmark and northern Troms to frustrate the Red Army as the Germans retreated southwards. As a consequence of this, few houses survived the war, and around two thirds of the population of 60,000 was forcefully evacuated further south. Tromsø was crowded with evacuees. Some people avoided evacuation by hiding in caves and mountain huts and waited until the Germans were gone, then inspected their burned homes. There were 11,000 houses, 4,700 cow sheds, 106 schools, 27 churches, and 21 hospitals burned. There were 22,000 communications lines destroyed, roads were blown up, boats destroyed, animals killed, and 1,000 children separated from their parents.

After taking the town of Kirkenes on 25 October 1944, as the first town in Norway, the Red Army did not attempt further offensives in Norway. Free Norwegian forces arrived from Britain and liberated the rest of the county. When war was over, more than 70,000 people were left homeless in Finnmark. The government imposed a temporary ban on residents returning to Finnmark because of the danger of landmines. The ban lasted until the summer of 1945 when evacuees were told that they could return home.

=== Cold War ===
The Cold War was a period with sometimes high tension in eastern Finnmark, at the 196-kilometre (122 mi) long border with the Soviet Union. To keep tensions from getting too high, Norway declared that no NATO exercises would take place in Finnmark.

== Geography ==
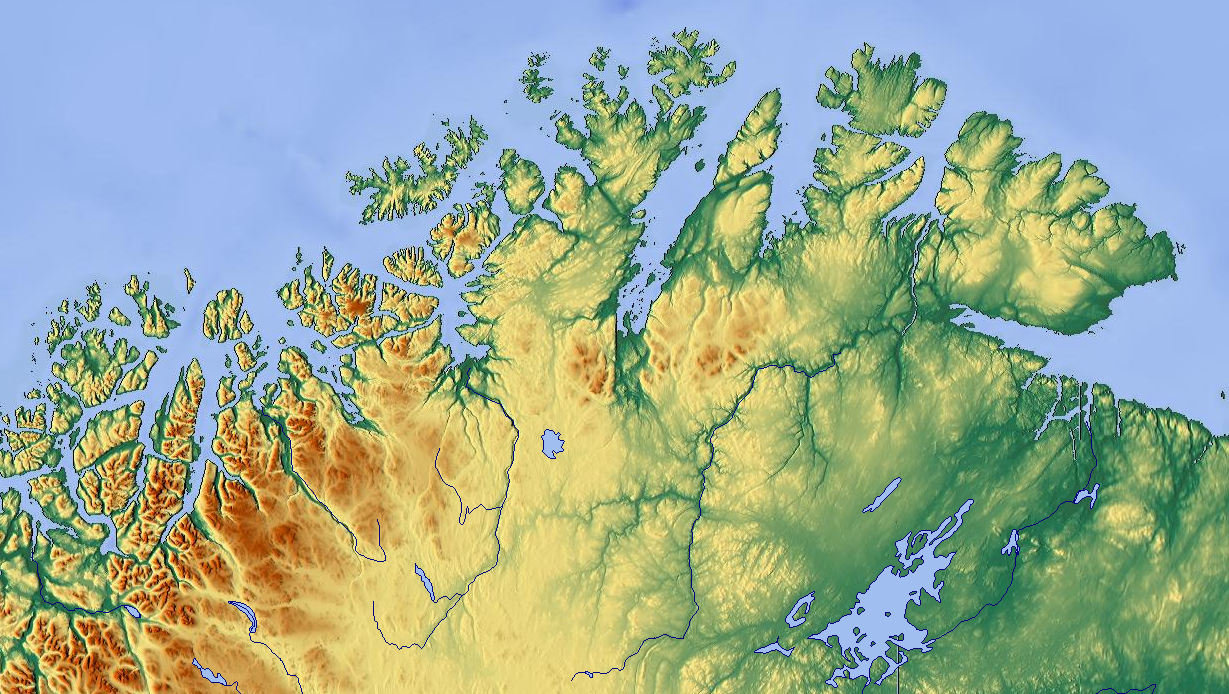
A map showing coastline and rivers. The largest river, slightly to the right, is Tana, and slightly to the left is Alta-Kautokeino river. Down to the right is lake Inari (Finland) from which goes the Pasvik valley of the Pasvikelva river. Near the far left corner of the map is the green Målselv valley of Troms, with the Målselva river.

Finnmark is Norway's northernmost and easternmost county (Svalbard is not considered a county). By area, Finnmark is Norway's second-largest county, even larger than the neighboring country of Denmark. With a population of about 75,000, it is also the least populous Norwegian county. Finnmark has a total coastline of 6,844 kilometres (4,253 mi), including 3,155 kilometres (1,960 mi) of coastline on the islands. As of 2000, nearly 12,300 people, 16.6% of the county's population, lived in the 100-meter belt along the coastline.

Knivskjellodden in Nordkapp Municipality (on the island of Magerøya) is sometimes considered Europe's northernmost point (on an island); Kinnarodden on Nordkinn Peninsula in Lebesby Municipality is the northernmost point on the European mainland. Honningsvåg in Finnmark claims to be world's northernmost city, and Vardø is the easternmost town in Norway and farther east than Istanbul.

The coast is indented by large fjords, some of which (in a strict sense) are false fjords, as they are not carved out by glaciers. Some of Norway's largest sea bird colonies are on the northern coast; the largest are Hjelmsøystauran on the island of Hjelmsøya in Måsøy Municipality and Gjesværstappan in Nordkapp Municipality. The highest point is atop the glacier Øksfjordjøkelen, which has an area of 45 square kilometres (17 sq mi), and is in Loppa Municipality. Both Øksfjordjøkelen and Seiland Glacier are in western Finnmark.

The Øksfjord plateau glacier calved directly into the sea (Jøkelfjorden) until 1900, the last glacier in mainland Norway to do so. Finnmark's central and eastern parts are generally less mountainous, and have no glaciers. The land east of Nordkapp is mostly below 300 m (980 ft).

The nature varies from barren coastal areas facing the Barents Sea to more sheltered fjord areas and river valleys with gullies and tree vegetation. About half the county is above the tree line, and large parts of the other half is covered with small Downy birch.

The lushest areas are the Alta area and the Tana valleys, and in the east is the lowland area in the Pasvik valley in Sør-Varanger Municipality, where the pine and Siberian spruce forest is considered part of the Russian taiga vegetation. This valley has the highest density of Brown bears in Norway. It is the only place in Finland with a population of muskrats, stemming from their introduction from their native North America into Europe in the early 20th century, which included their release in 293 localities all over Finland from 1919 onward, and then of about 1,000 muskrats on the Kola Peninsula during 1931–36.

The animal spread and the observations of first 'possible' muskrats in the river Alta area in Troms were made around 1960. The first specimen was recovered in 1969, when a muskrat was captured alive in Smalfjord in Tana Municipality.

In 1970, another specimen was collected from Jarfjorden in Sør-Varanger Municipality in Finnmark (Pedersen 1970). Between 1980 and 1988 there were few observations of muskrats in Norway (Lund & Wikan 1995). Since 1988 there has been a rapid population increase in Sör-Varanger, and the muskrat has spread to almost every part of the municipality. Lynx and moose are common in large parts of Finnmark, but rare on the coast.

The county's interior parts are part of the great Finnmarksvidda plateau, with an elevation of 300 to 400 m (980 to 1,310 ft), with multiple lakes and river valleys. The plateau is famous for its tens of thousands of reindeer owned by the Sámi, and swarms of mosquitoes in midsummer. Finnmarksvidda makes up 36% of the county's area. Stabbursdalen National Park ensures protection for the world's northernmost Scots pine forest.

The Tana River, which partly defines the border with Finland, gives the largest catch of salmon of all rivers in Europe, and also has the world record for Atlantic salmon, 36 kg (79 lb). In the east, the Pasvikelva defines the border with Russia.

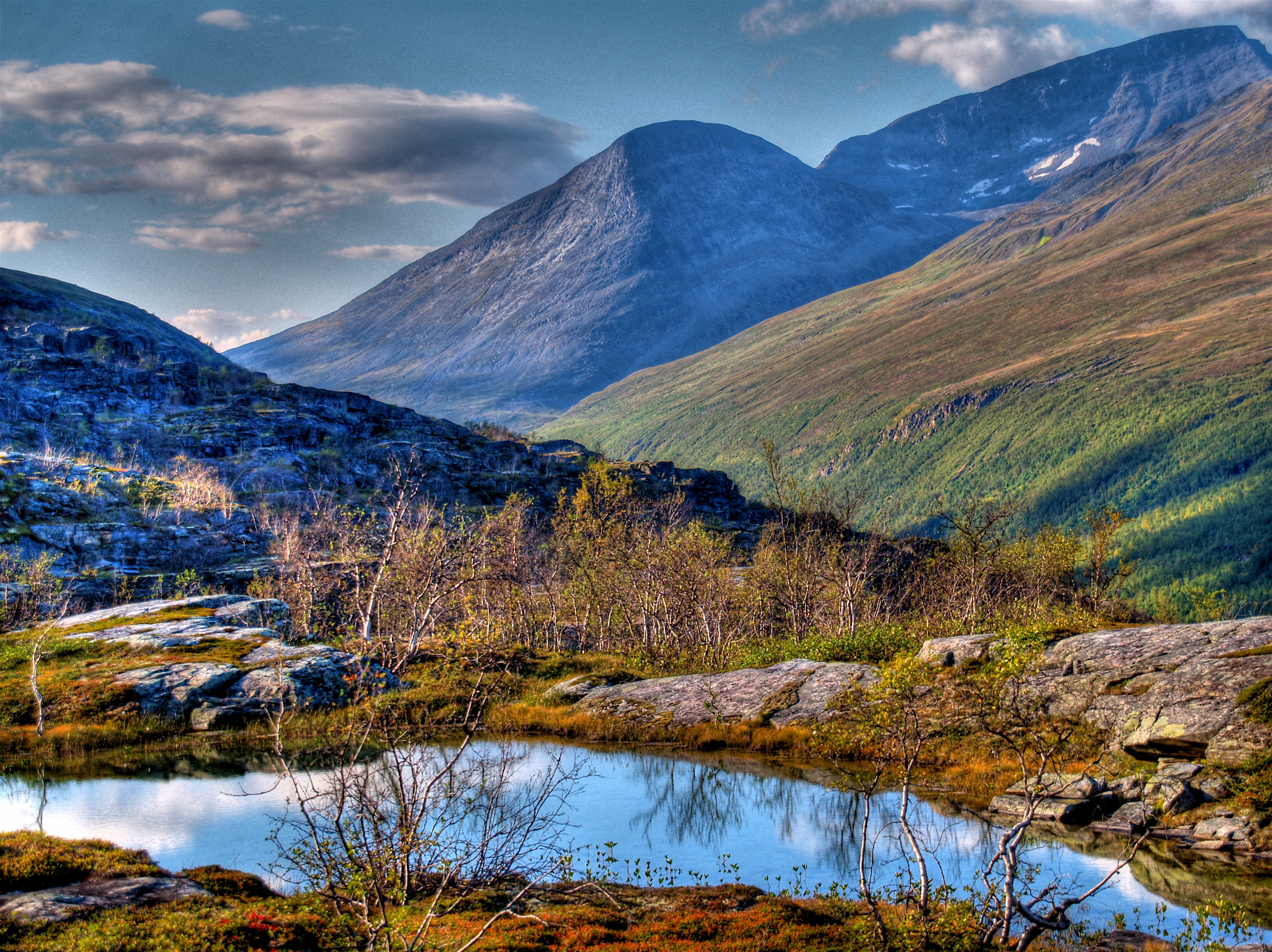
A mountain landscape near Kvalsund in Hammerfest Municipality

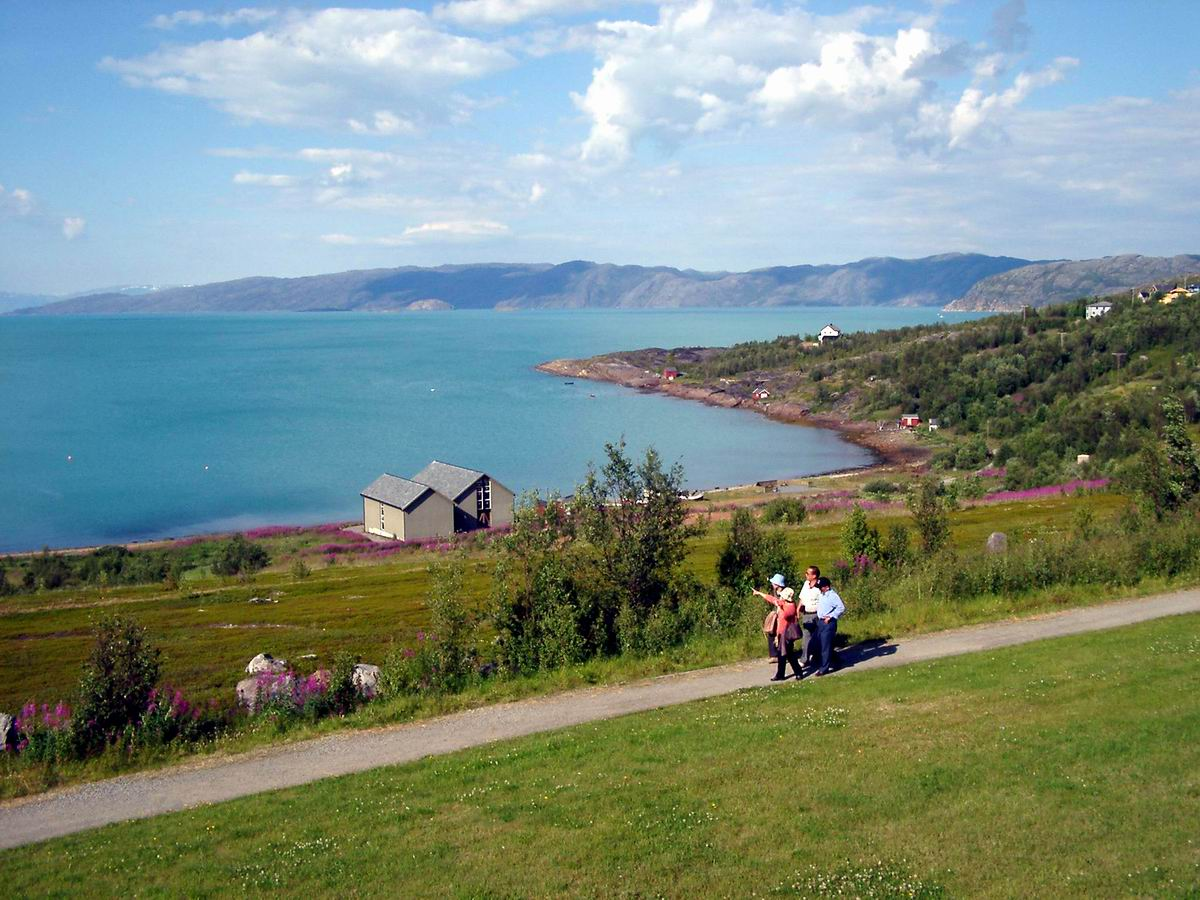
Altafjorden, Alta, 2003

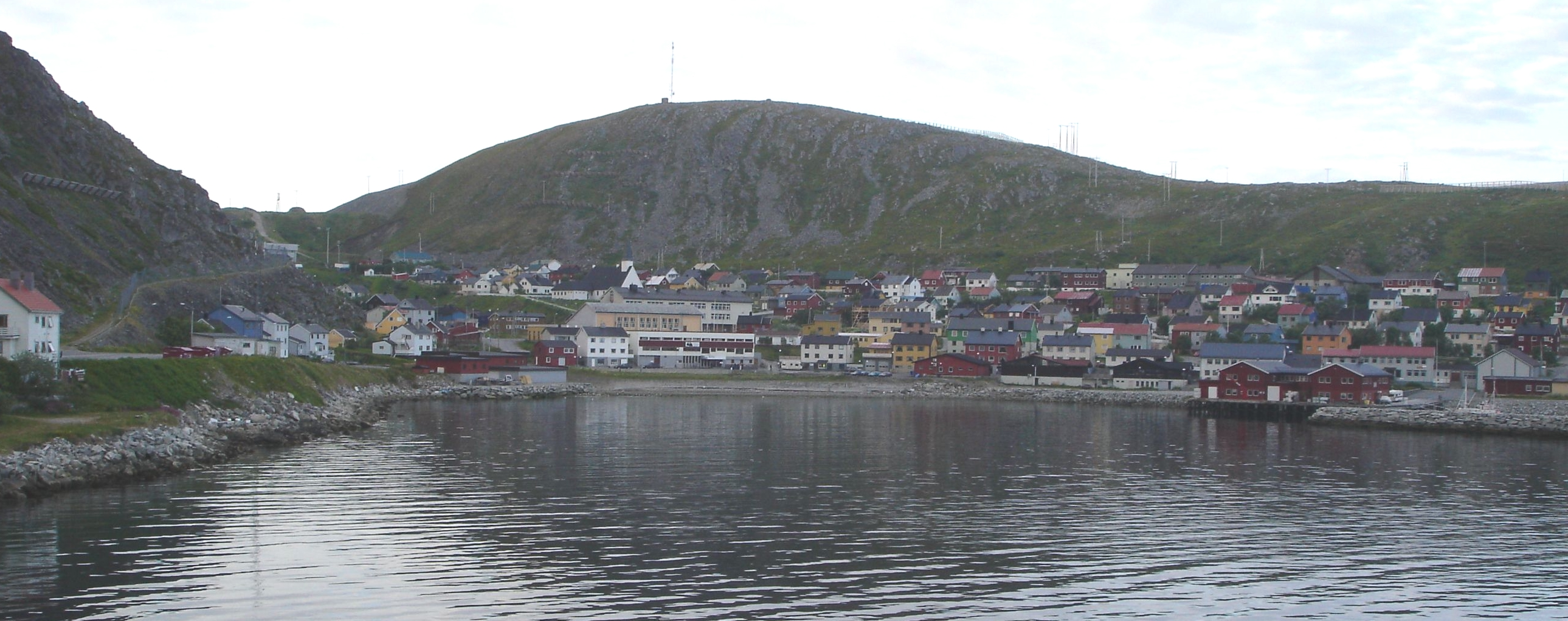
Kjøllefjord on the northeastern coast

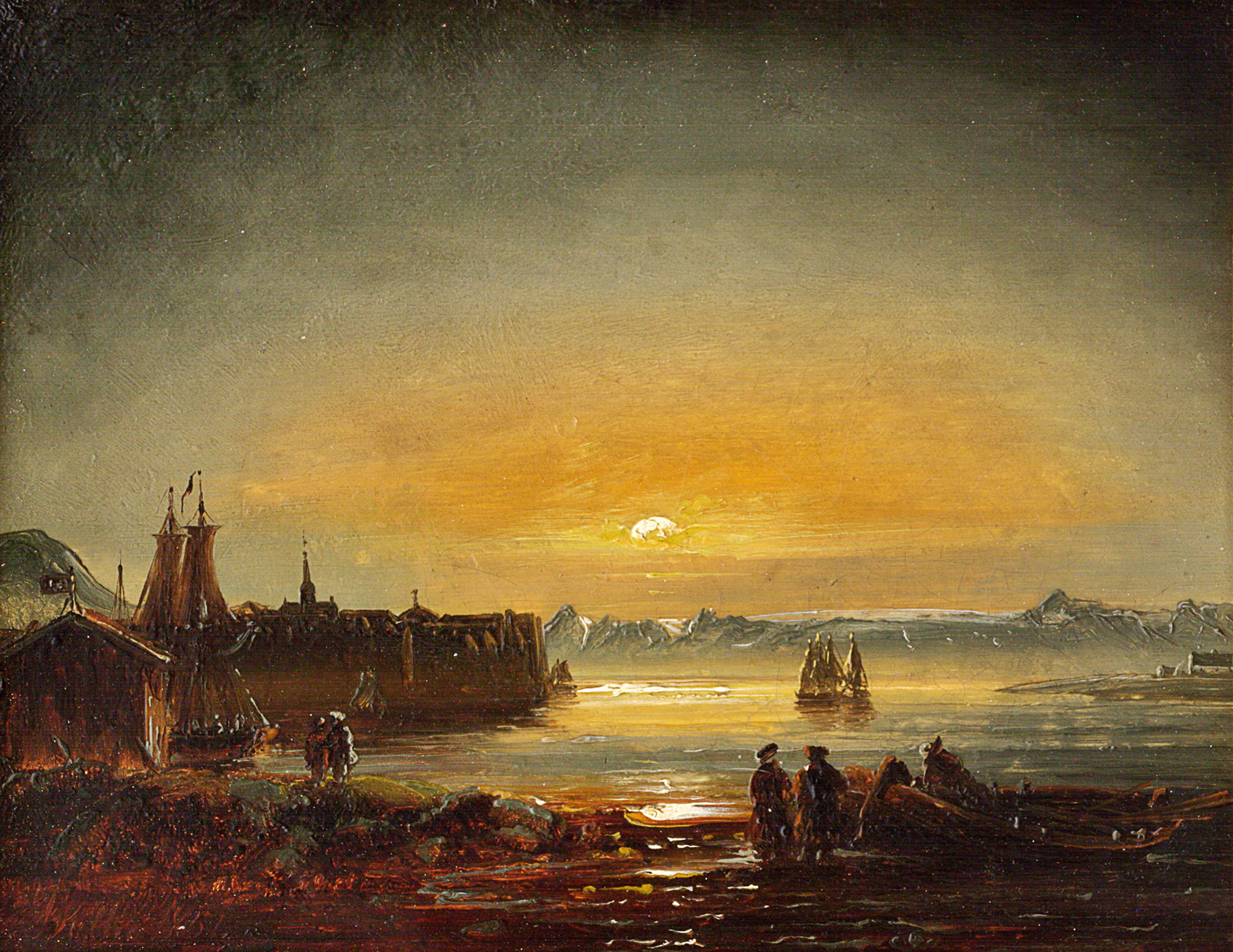
Fra Hammerfest by Peder Balke (1851)

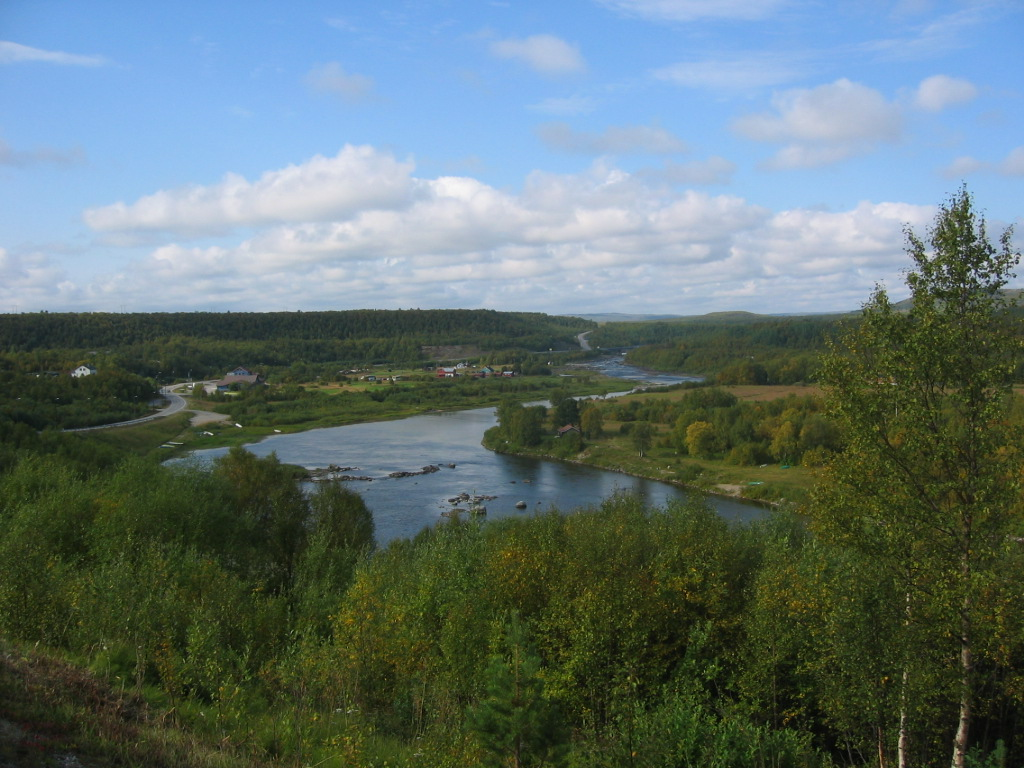
Neiden in Sør-Varanger

=== Climate ===
Alta Airport (1961–90)

Climate chart (precipitation, max. and min. temperature)
J	F	M	A	M	J	J	A	S	O	N	D
32 −5 −13	25 −5 −12	23 −1 −9	17 3 −4	20 8 2	33 14 7	54 17 10	49 15 9	38 10 4	39 4 −1	34 −1 −7	36 −3 −11
- █ Average max. and min. temperatures in °C
- █ Precipitation totals in mm
- Source: met.no/klimastatistikk/eklima
Imperial conversion
J	F	M	A	M	J	J	A	S	O	N	D
1.3 22 9	1 24 11	0.9 29 17	0.7 37 25	0.8 46 35	1.3 57 45	2.1 63 50	1.9 59 48	1.5 50 40	1.5 39 30	1.3 31 20	1.4 26 13
- █ Average max. and min. temperatures in °F
- █ Precipitation totals in inches

The Finnmarksvidda plateau in the interior of the county has a continental climate with the coldest winter temperatures in Norway: the coldest temperature ever recorded was −51.4 °C (−60.5 °F) in Karasjok Municipality on 1 January 1886. The 24-hour averages for January and July at the same location are −17.1 °C (1.2 °F) and 13.1 °C (55.6 °F). The annual average is −2.4 °C (27.7 °F). Precipitation is 366 millimetres (14.4 in) per year. Summer is the wettest season.

Karasjok has recorded up to 32.4 °C (90.3 °F) in July, giving a possible year amplitude of 84 °C (151 °F), rare in Europe. Finnmarksvidda has annual mean temperatures down to −3 °C (27 °F) at Sihcajavri in Kautokeino Municipality, the coldest in mainland Norway, except for higher mountain areas, and even colder than Jan Mayen and Bear Island. Sihcajavri has also recorded 34.3 °C (93.7 °F) on 23 June 1920.

Due to the proximity to the ice-free ocean, winters are much milder in coastal areas, and more windy. Loppa Municipality has average January and July temperatures of −2 °C (28 °F) and 11.6 °C (52.9 °F) respectively, with an annual mean of 3.6 °C (38.5 °F), despite being further north. Average annual precipitation is 914 millimetres (36.0 in). The wettest season is September until December. The year average temperature difference between Loppa and Karasjok (6 °C) is comparable to the difference between Loppa and London.

In the Köppen climate classification, the climate in Karasjok–and most of the lowland areas in Finnmark–corresponds to the Dfc category (subarctic climate). The Loppa climate corresponds to the Cfc category. The northeastern coast, from Nordkapp Municipality east to Vardø Municipality, have arctic tundra climate (Köppen: ET), as the average July temperature is below 10 °C (50 °F).

Elevations exceeding approximately 100 to 200 metres (330 to 660 ft) in coastal areas in western Finnmark and 300 to 500 metres (980 to 1,640 ft) in the interior result in an alpine climate. In the northeast, this merges with the Arctic tundra climate.

The climate in sheltered parts of fjord areas, particularly the Altafjorden, is usually considered the most hospitable: winters are not as cold as in the interior, and summer warmth is comparable. Even if winter temperatures are milder in coastal areas, the coast is more exposed to winter storms, which often complicate or shut down road and air communications.

=== Midnight sun ===
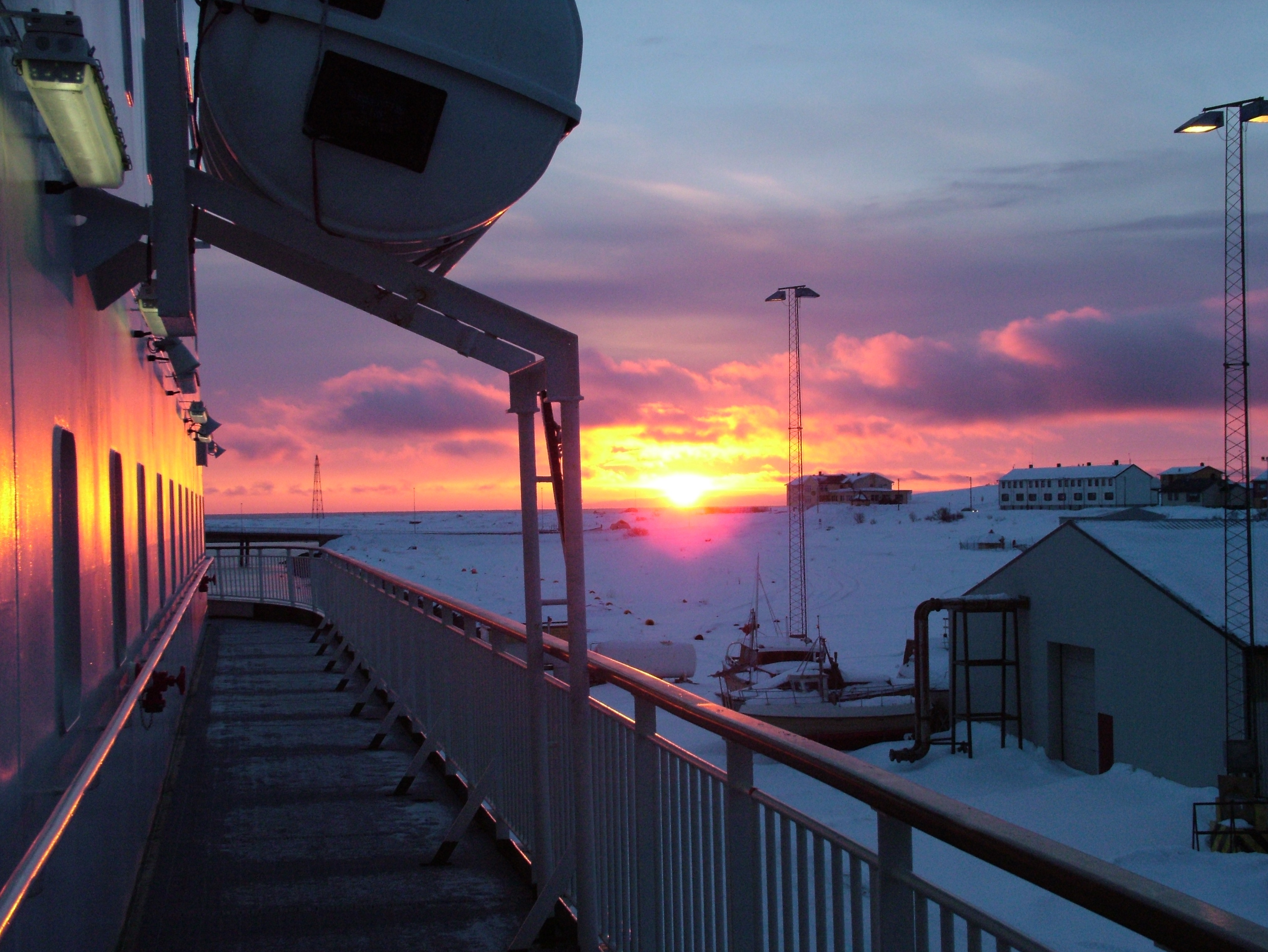
Sunrise at 07:33 in February, Vadsø

Situated north of the Arctic Circle, Finnmark has midnight sun from the middle of May until late July. From late November to late January, the county has polar nights where the sun is always below the horizon. As a consequence, there is continuous daylight from early May to early August. At midwinter, there is only a bluish twilight for a couple of hours around noon, which can almost reach full daylight if there are clear skies to the south.

=== Northern lights ===
Finnmark is in the Aurora Borealis zone. Because of the dry climate with frequent clear skies, Alta Municipality was early chosen as a location for study of the phenomenon. For this reason, Alta is sometimes called the city of the northern lights.

== Demographics ==
Historical population
Year	Pop.	±%
1951	64,511	—
1961	72,104	+11.8%
1971	76,311	+5.8%
1981	78,331	+2.6%
1991	74,590	−4.8%
2001	74,087	−0.7%
2011	73,417	−0.9%
2016	75,758	+3.2%
Source: Statistics Norway.

Religion in Finnmark
religion	percent
Christianity	89.2%
Islam	0.32%
Buddhism	0.11%
Other	10.37%

The old Stone Age Komsa culture is difficult to relate to the people living in Finnmark today. There are findings suggesting that the Sami people have been there for a long time, but exactly how long is unclear, some scholars claiming 8000 years but others only 2500 years. From the 10th century, the coastal areas have been populated and visited by ethnic Norwegians, and Finnmark became part of the kingdom.

The Sami core areas in Norway are in Finnmark, where they constitute about one quarter of the total population. Kautokeino Municipality, Karasjok Municipality, Tana Municipality, Nesseby Municipality, and Porsanger Municipality in Finnmark county (and some other municipalities in other counties) have official names in the Sami language. Most municipalities in Sápmi have unofficial names in Sámi as well.

In the 18th century and the 19th century, a number of Finnish-speaking immigrants settled in Finnmark. Since 1996, they have had minority status as Kven people. The town of Vadsø (Kven: Vesisaari) is often seen as the "Kven capital" in Finnmark.

Lakselv, in central Finnmark, is sometimes referred to as "meeting place for three tribes". After the collapse of the Soviet Union and severe economic troubles in the Russian economy during the 1990s, Russian immigrants and shoppers arrived in Kirkenes. Since the beginning of the European migrant crisis a number of Syrian refugees arrived in Kirkenes via Russia.

People have lived in Finnmark for at least 10,000 years. See Komsa, Pit-Comb Ware culture and Rock carvings at Alta. The destiny of these early cultures is unknown. Three ethnic groups have a long history in Finnmark: the Sami people, the Norwegian people, and the Kven people. Of these, the Sami probably were the first people to explore Finnmark.

Ohthere of Hålogaland was an adventurous Norwegian (Norseman) from Hålogaland, the area roughly corresponding to today's Nordland county. Around 890 AD, he claimed, according to historical sources (see Ohthere of Hålogaland) that he lived "north-most of all the Northmen", and that "no one [lived] to the north of him." Later, Norwegians in the 14th century, and Kvens in the 16th century, settled along the coast. See the articles on Kven people and Vardøhus Fortress for more details.

== Economy ==
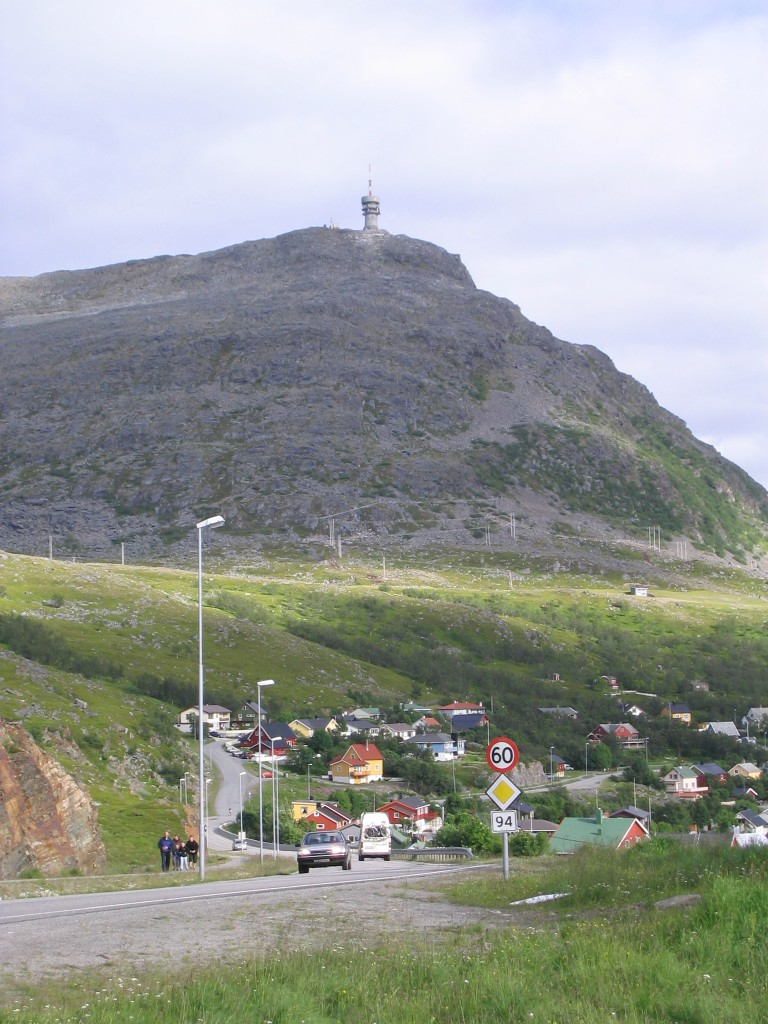
The Hammerfest suburb of Rypefjord

Fisheries have traditionally been the most important way of living along the coast, where the majority of the Norwegian population live. The red king crab, originally from the northern Pacific Ocean but brought to the Barents sea by the Russians, have invaded from the east and are now being exploited commercially (especially in the Varangerfjord). To prevent the crab from spreading too far south, crab fishing west of Nordkapp is totally unregulated.

In more recent years, tourism has grown in importance, with the North Cape (in Nordkapp Municipality) and the towns of Alta and Hammerfest as the most important destinations.

As of 2001, one percent of the work force were employed in the oil industry and the mining industry.

There is some mining industry, though exploitation of the iron ores along the Kirkenes–Bjørnevatn Line was paused in 2015 and has not restarted as of 2022.

The slate industry in Alta is well known and have sold to customers as far away as Japan.

An irregular procurement of a commuter boat [or ferry ] in 2020, priced at Norwegian kroner 83 million, is still (as of 2022) causing fear that Finnmark will alone get stuck with paying off the boat (when Finnmark becomes a county in 2024); the expense can lead to budget cuts.

The town of Hammerfest is experiencing an economic boom as a consequence of Statoil's construction of the large land-based LNG site on the island of Melkøya, which gets natural gas from the Snøhvit undersea gas field. A new oil field was discovered in 2009 just 45 km (28 mi) off shore, close to the Snøhvit field.

There is optimism in the eastern part of the county, as the growing petroleum activity in the Barents Sea is expected to generate increased economic activity on land as well.

Some snow molds are prevalent and well adapted here, including Sclerotinia borealis and Typhula ishikariensis (especially T. i. group III). Both are pathogens of wheat, and S. b. also affects rye, barley, and some trees.

=== Infrastructure ===
There are eleven airports, but only Alta Airport, Lakselv-Banak Airport, and Kirkenes-Høybuktmoen Airport have direct flights to Oslo. In addition, Lakselv-Banak Airport in Porsanger Municipality is used for training by the Royal Norwegian Air Force and other NATO allies, in conjunction with the nearby Halkavarre shooting range, which allows for practice with precision-guided munitions. Garnisonen i Porsanger is near the Halkavarre training area. There is also the Garnisonen i Sør-Varanger (Gsv) in the east, which guards the border with Russia.

== Administration ==
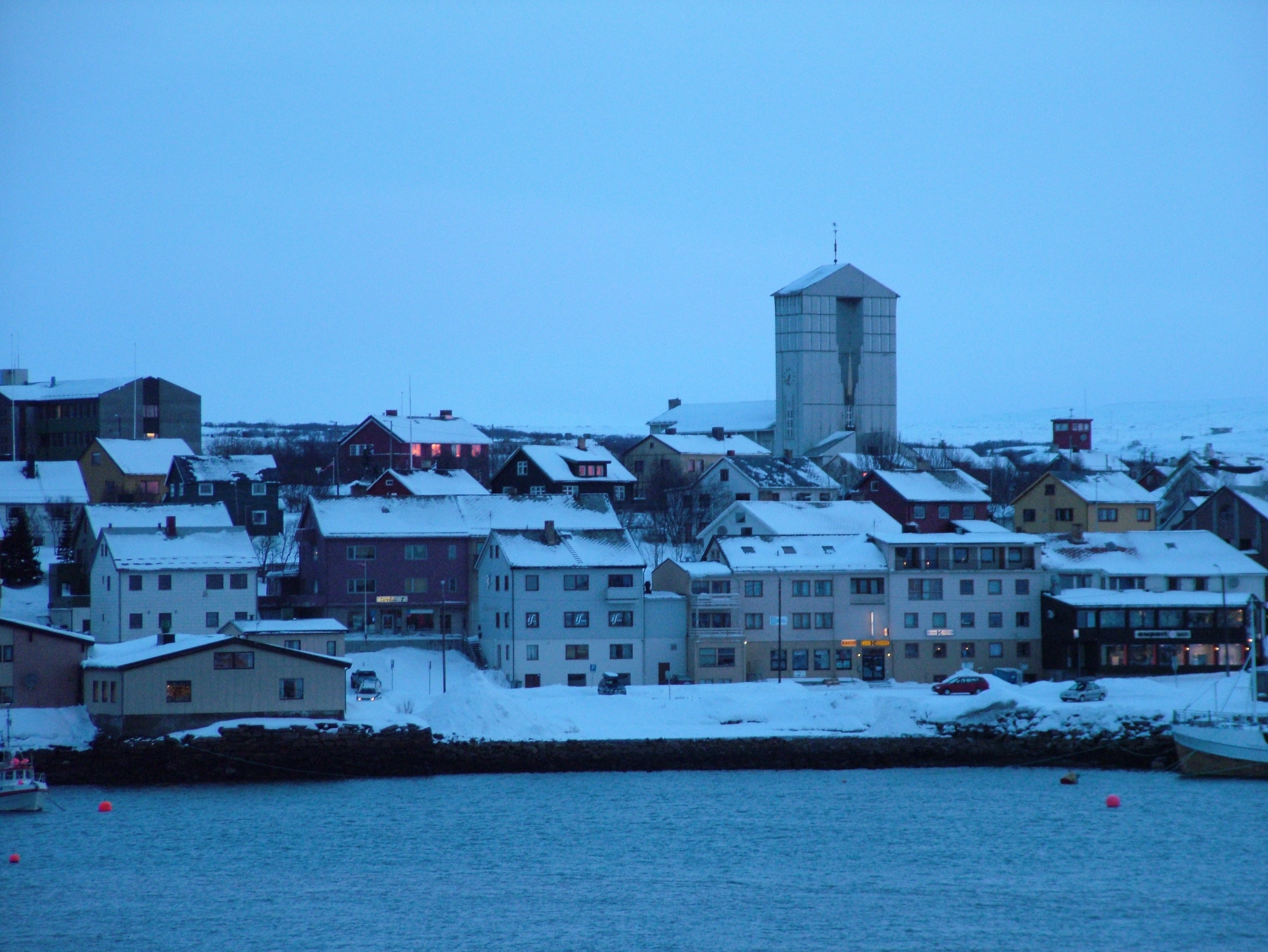
Vadsø with the church, February 2004

The town of Vadsø is the administrative centre for the county of Finnmark, although Alta has the largest population. The Finnmark County Municipality was the governing body for the county. The county was generally divided into two districts: West-Finnmark (Vest-Finnmark) and East-Finnmark (Øst-Finnmark).

Until 2006, Statskog, the Norwegian state-owned agency responsible for the management of state owned forest and mountain real estate, owned about 95% of the land in Finnmark county. On 1 July 2006, the Finnmark Estate agency took over the ownership and management of that land in Finnmark. The Finnmark Estate was governed in tandem by the Finnmark County Municipality and the Sami Parliament of Norway. The Sami Parliament of Norway is based in the village of Karasjok.

The national government runs the Northern Norway Regional Health Authority which in turn owns and operates two hospitals in Finnmark, located in Kirkenes and Hammerfest.

=== Municipalities ===
There were 19 municipalities in Finnmark when the county merged into Troms og Finnmark. 18 of those exist as of 2021.

Municipalities in Finnmark
Key
1. Alta; 2. Berlevåg; 3. Båtsfjord; 4. Gamvik; 5. Hammerfest; 6. Hassvik; 7. Kárášjohka or Karasjok; 8. Guovdageaidnu or Kautokeino; 9. Hammerfest (formerly Kvalsund, merged in 2020); 10. Lebesby; 11. Loppa; 12. Måsøy; 13. Unjárga or Nesseby; 14. Nordkapp; 15. Porsanger or Porsángu or Porsanki; 16. Sør-Varanger; 17. Deatnu or Tana; 18. Vadsø; 19. Vardø

== Bibliography ==
- Bjørbæk, Gustav (2003). Norsk Vær i 110 År. Oslo: Damm. ISBN 978-82-04-08695-2.
- Brooke, Arthur de Capell (1826). A winter in Lapland and Sweden, with various observations relating to Finmark and its inhabitants. John Murray.
- Hansen, Lars Ivar (2010). "The Arctic Dimension of 'Norgesveldet'". In Imsen, Steinar (ed.). The Norwegian Domination and the Norse World, c. 1100 – c. 1400. Tapir Academic Press. pp. 230–249. ISBN 978-82-519-2563-1.
- Haugan, Trygve B, ed. (1940). Det Nordlige Norge Fra Trondheim Til Midnattssolens Land. Trondheim: Reisetrafikkforeningen for Trondheim og Trøndelag.
- Moen, Asbjørn (1998). Nasjonalatlas for Norge: Vegetasjon. Hønefoss: Statens Kartverk. ISBN 978-82-90408-26-3.
- Norwegian Meteorological Institute (24-hr averages, 1961–90 base period)
- Tollefsrud, Jan Inge; Tjørve, Even; Hermansen, Pål (1991). Perler i Norsk Natur – En Veiviser. Aschehoug. ISBN 978-82-03-16663-1.
