= Kamøyfjorden =

Fjord on Magerøya, Norway

Kamøyfjorden (Norwegian)
- Gáhpevuotna (Northern Sami)
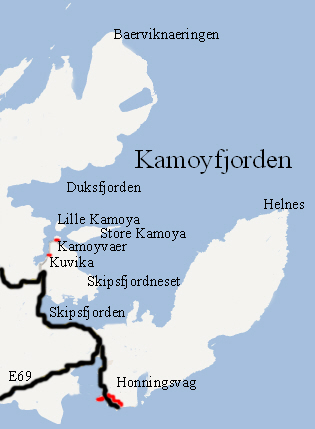
- View of the fjord
- Interactive map of the fjord
- Location: Finnmark county, Norway
- Coordinates: 71.0598°N 26.0100°E
- Type: Fjord
- Primary inflows: Duksfjorden, Skipsfjorden
- Primary outflows: Barents Sea
- Basin countries: Norway
- Max. length: 13 kilometres (8.1 mi)
- Max. width: 6.5 kilometres (4.0 mi)
- Max. depth: 153 metres (502 ft)
- Islands: Store Kamøya and Lille Kamøya

Kamøyfjorden (Northern Sami: Gáhpevuotna) is a fjord on the northeastern side of the large island of Magerøya in Nordkapp Municipality in Finnmark county, Norway. The 14-kilometre (8.7 mi) long fjord runs from the Barents Sea southwest with two smaller fjords that branch off: the Skipsfjorden flowing to the south and the Duksfjorden flowing to the west.

The mouth of the fjord spans between Beinviknæringen in the northwest and the Helnes Lighthouse in the southeast. The town of Honningsvåg lies just to the south of the fjord. The large Porsangerfjorden lies immediately to the east of this fjord. The Kamøyfjorden reaches a depth of 153 metres (502 ft) at its deepest point, just northwest of Helnes.

The islands of Store Kamøya and Lille Kamøya lie in the middle of the fjord and, just north of the fishing village of Kamøyvær. Store Kamøya marks the entrances to the small side fjords: Duksfjorden along the north side of the island and Skipsfjorden to the south side of the island, around the Skipsfjordneset point. The small Risfjorden flows south from the Duksfjorden, running south on the western side of the villages of Kamøyvær and Kuvika.

The European route E69 highway runs along the innermost part of the fjord, along the south side of Skipsfjorden.

== See also ==
- List of Norwegian fjords
