= Store Kamøya, Nordkapp =

Island in Norway

Store Kamøya
Native name: Gáhpesuolu
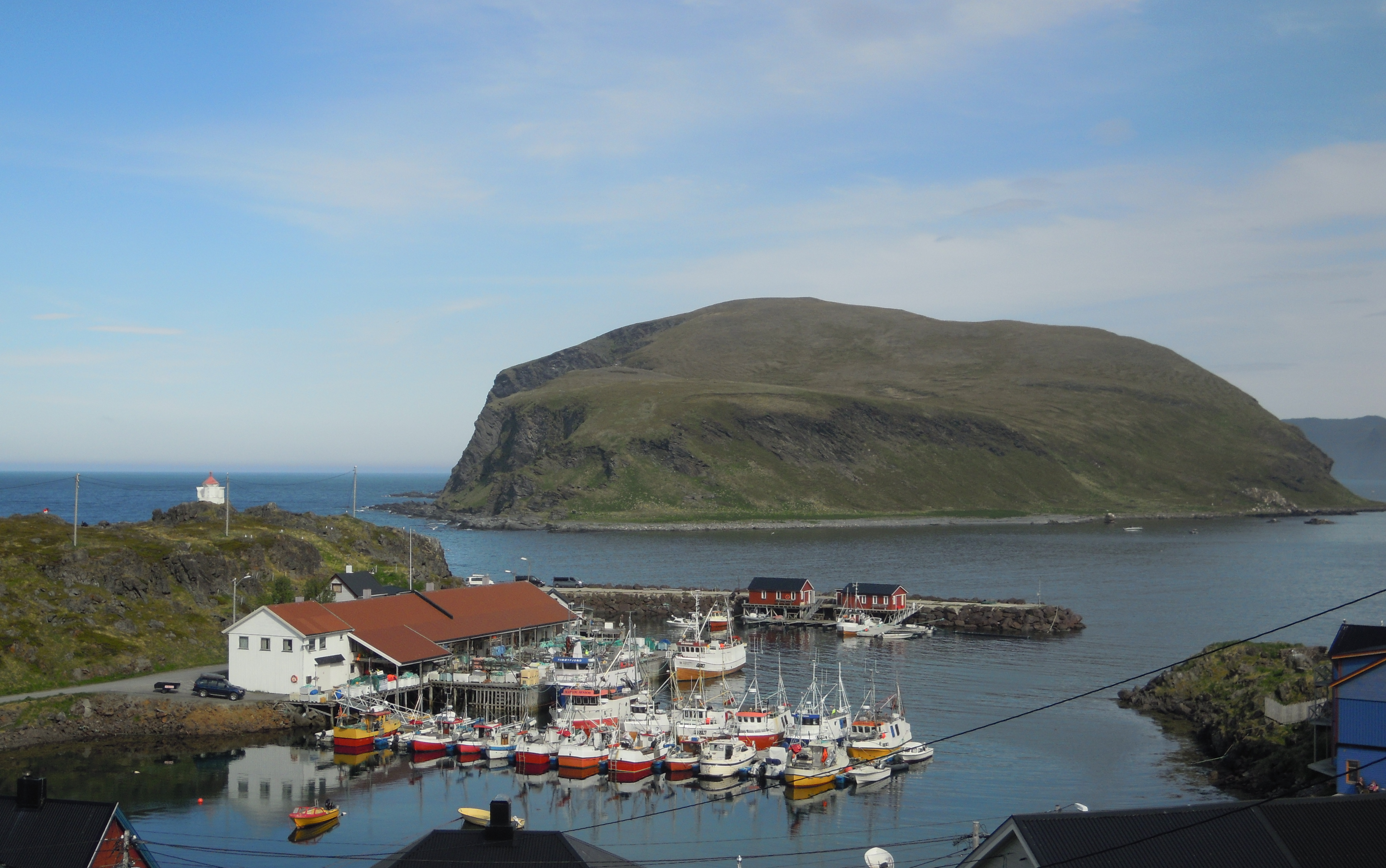
- View of the island from Kamøyvær
- Interactive map of Store Kamøya

Geography
- Location: Finnmark, Norway
- Coordinates: 71.0515°N 25.9504°E
- Area: 1.06 km^{2} (0.41 sq mi)
- Length: 2.5 km (1.55 mi)
- Width: 735 km (456.7 mi)
- Highest elevation: 170 m (560 ft)

Administration
- Norway
- County: Finnmark
- Municipality: Nordkapp Municipality

Store Kamøya (Northern Sami: Gáhpesuolu) is a small island in Nordkapp Municipality in Finnmark county, Norway. It is located off the eastern coast of the large island of Magerøya where the Kamøyfjorden splits into the Duksfjorden and Skipsfjorden. It lies just to the southeast of the island of Lille Kamøya and to the east of the fishing village of Kamøyvær, helping to shelter the latter's harbour from the open sea.

== See also ==
- List of islands of Norway
