= Helnes Lighthouse =

Coastal lighthouse in Nordkapp, Norway

Helnes Lighthouse Helnes fyrstasjon
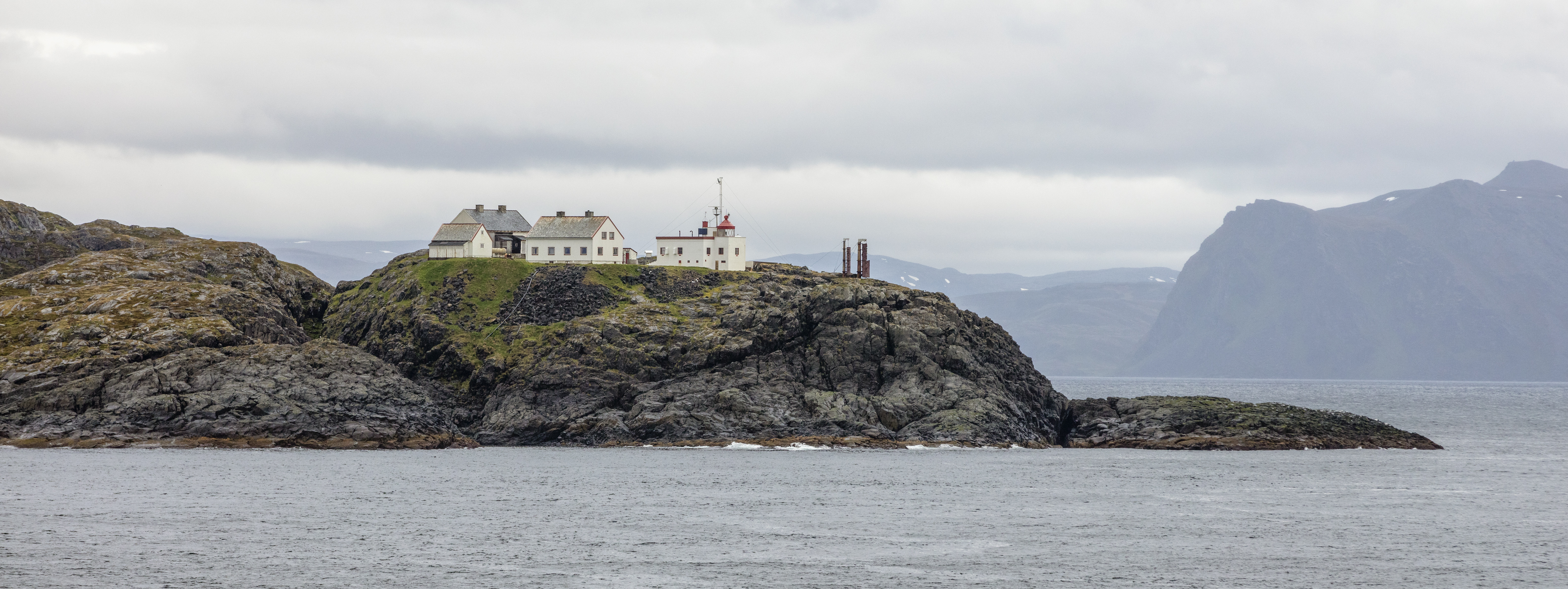
- View of the lighthouse
- Location of the lighthouse
- Location: Finnmark, Norway
- Coordinates: 71°03′42.2″N 26°13′21.4″E

Tower
- Constructed: 1908 (first)
- Construction: Concrete
- Automated: 2004
- Height: 10 metres (33 ft)
- Shape: Square tower
- Markings: white with red top
- Fog signal: None
- Racon: N (– •)

Light
- First lit: late 1940s (current)
- Focal height: 37.5 metres (123 ft)
- Intensity: 1,371,000 candela
- Range: 13.5 nmi (25.0 km; 15.5 mi)
- Characteristic: Fl (2) W 30s
- Norway no.: 946000

Helnes Lighthouse (Norwegian: Helnes fyr) is a coastal lighthouse located on the northeastern coast of the island of Magerøya in Nordkapp Municipality in Finnmark county, Norway. The lighthouse sits on the western side of the mouth of the large Porsangerfjorden, about 12 kilometres (7.5 mi) east of the village of Kamøyvær and about 13 kilometres (8.1 mi) northeast of the town of Honningsvåg. The lighthouse was established in 1908, destroyed during World War II in 1944, rebuilt from 1946–1948, and automated in 2004. A radio beacon was established in 1955 and it emits a racon signal that is a Morse code letter N (– •).

The 10-metre (33 ft) tall white concrete tower has a light on top at an elevation of 37.5 metres (123 ft) above sea level. The 1,371,000-candela light emits two white flashes every 30 seconds. The light can be seen for up to 13.5 nautical miles (25.0 km; 15.5 mi) in all directions.

== See also ==
- Lighthouses in Norway
- List of lighthouses in Norway
