= Lille Kamøya, Nordkapp =

Island in Norway

Lille Kamøya (Norwegian); Uhca Gáhpesuolu (Northern Sami)
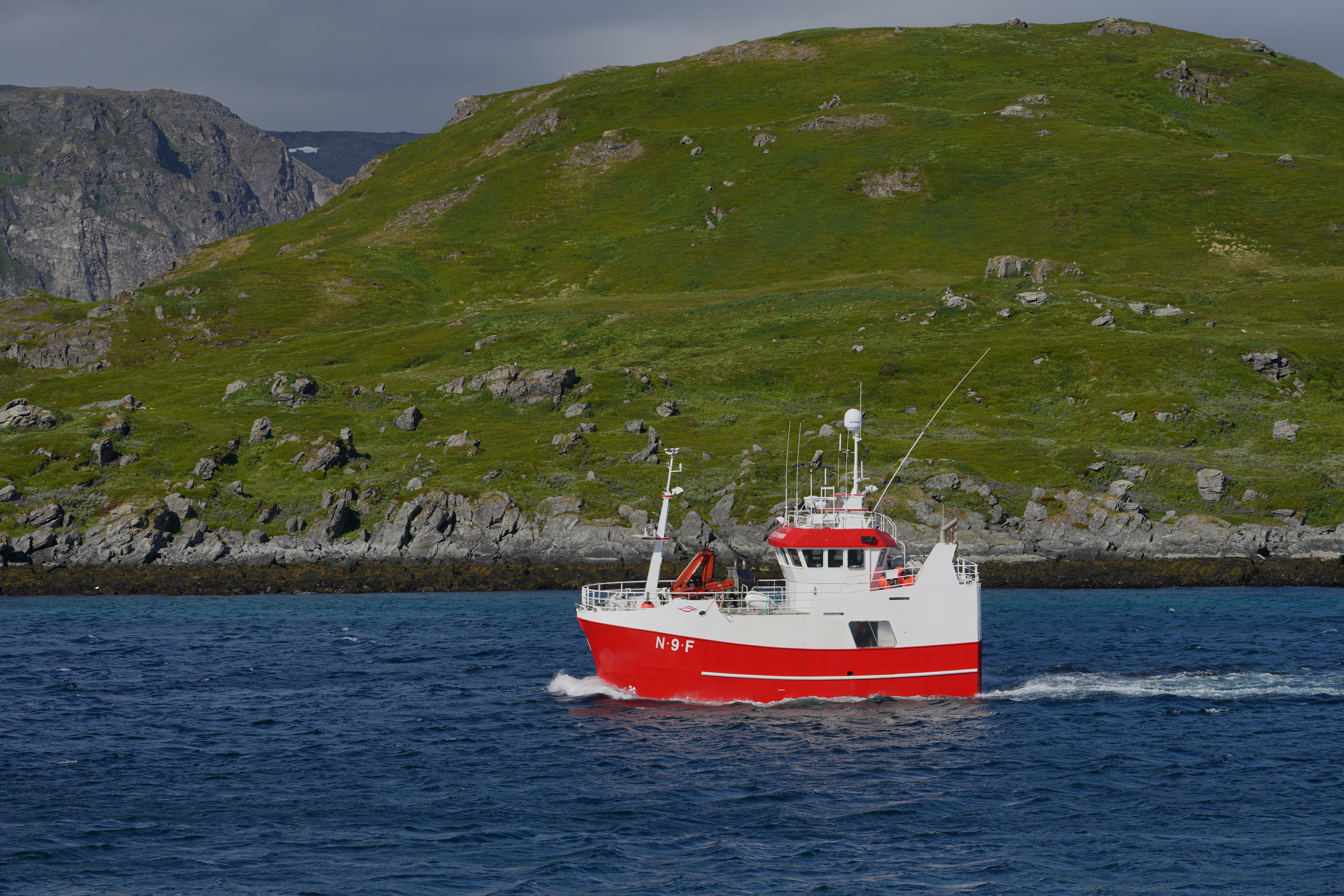
- Lille Kamøya (2025)
- Interactive map of: Lille Kamøya (Norwegian); Uhca Gáhpesuolu (Northern Sami)

Geography
- Location: Finnmark, Norway
- Coordinates: 71.0555°N 25.9100°E
- Area: 160 ha (400 acres)
- Length: 575 m (1886 ft)
- Width: 500 m (1600 ft)
- Highest elevation: 68 m (223 ft)

Administration
- Norway
- County: Finnmark
- Municipality: Nordkapp Municipality

Lille Kamøya (Northern Sami: Uhca Gáhpesuolu) is a small island in Nordkapp Municipality in Finnmark county, Norway. It is located just off the eastern coast of the large island of Magerøya. It lies where the Duksfjorden meets the Kamøyfjorden, just to the northwest of the island of Store Kamøya and to the north of the fishing village of Kamøyvær. The island helps to shelter Kamøyvær's harbour from the open sea.

== Important Bird Area ==
The island, along with nearby Bondøya, has been designated an Important Bird Area (IBA) by BirdLife International because it supports breeding colonies of European shags, great black-backed gulls and razorbills.

== See also ==
- List of islands of Norway
