= Skipsfjorden, Magerøya =

Fjord in Nordkapp, Norway

Skipsfjorden (Norwegian)
- Skiipavuotna (Northern Sami)
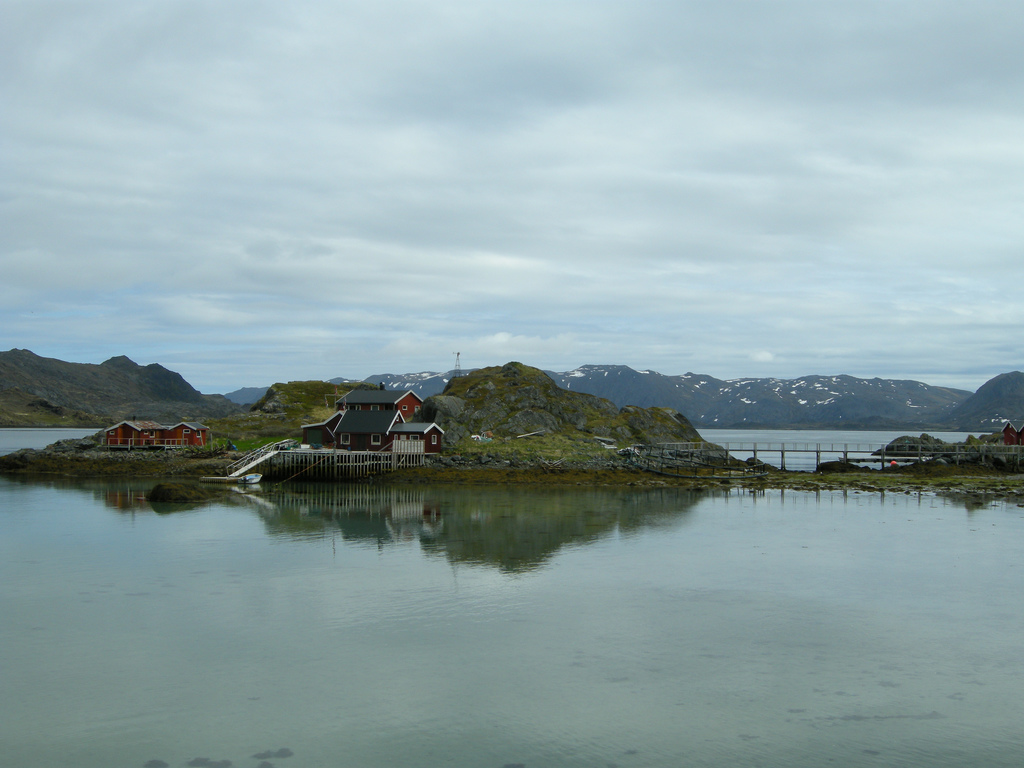
- Looking east towards Trollholmen in Skipsfjorden, the bridge from the main island of Magerøya on the right hand side
- Interactive map of the fjord
- Location: Finnmark county, Norway
- Coordinates: 71.0138°N 25.9281°E
- Type: Fjord
- Primary outflows: Kamøyfjorden
- Basin countries: Norway
- Max. length: 4 kilometres (2.5 mi)
- Max. depth: 101 metres (331 ft)

Skipsfjorden (Northern Sami: Skiipavuotna) is the southern arm of the Kamøyfjorden, a fjord on the eastern side of the island of Magerøya in Nordkapp Municipality in Finnmark county, Norway.

The mouth of the fjord spans between the Skipsfjordneset headland in the northwest and Selvågklubben peninsula in the southeast. The fjord extends about 4 kilometres (2.5 mi) to the west, and the island of Trollholmen is located near the end of the fjord. The fjord reaches a maximum depth of 101 metres (331 ft) at the outer reaches of the fjord.

The small village of Skipsfjord lies along the north side of the bottom of the fjord, while the hamlets of Valan and Austerelva are situated on the south side. The Honningsvåg Airport is located on the southern shore of the fjord. The town of Honningsvåg lies a little ways south of the fjord. The European route E69 highway runs along the southern side of the bay.

== See also ==
- List of Norwegian fjords
