= Kjelvik =

- Abandoned village
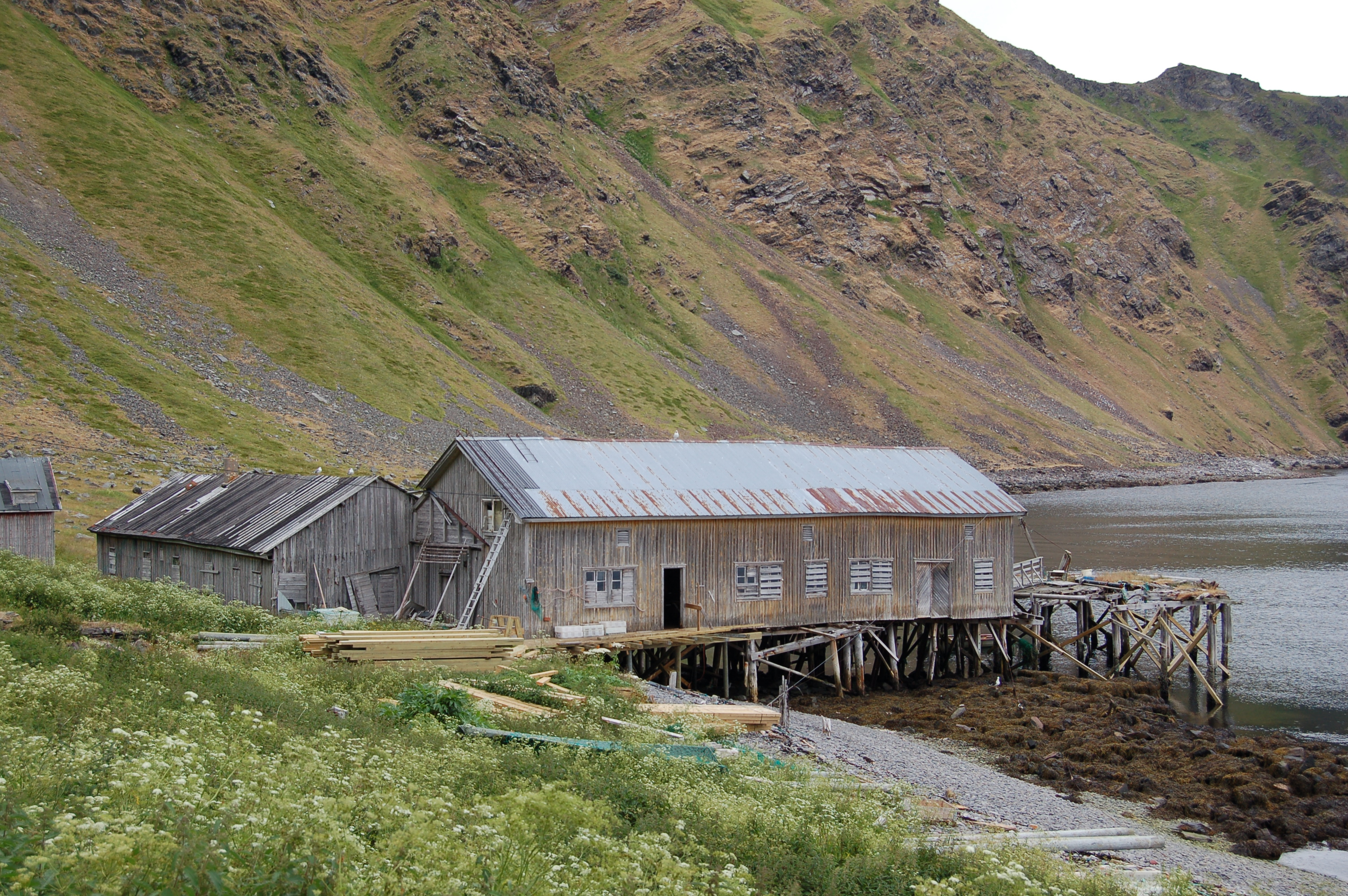
- The advanced fish processing building (2014)
- Interactive map of Kjelvik
- Location within Finnmark Location within Norway
- Coordinates: 71°00′07″N 26°06′45″E
- Country: Norway
- Region: Northern Norway
- County: Finnmark
- District: Vest-Finnmark
- Municipality: Nordkapp Municipality
- Elevation: 7 m (23 ft)
- Time zone: UTC+01:00 (CET)
  - Summer (DST): UTC+02:00 (CEST)
- Post Code: 9760 Nordvågen

Kjelvik is an abandoned fishing village in Nordkapp Municipality in Finnmark county, Norway. It is located on the island of Magerøya, about 5 kilometres (3.1 mi) northeast of the town of Honningsvåg and about 3.5 kilometres (2.2 mi) northeast of the village of Nordvågen. It sits near the mouth of the Porsangerfjorden. The village no longer has any permanent residents, but the homes are still used as vacation homes in the summer.

Kjelvik was the original name of Nordkapp municipality since Kjelvik was one of the largest settlements in the municipality, larger even than Honningsvåg. However, during World War II, the village was destroyed by German forces in 1944, and it never recovered. As a consequence of this, in 1950 the name of the municipality was changed to Nordkapp to recognize the importance of the nearby North Cape.

== Name ==
The village is named after the old Kjelvik farm (Old Norse: Ketilvík) since the first Kjelvik Church was built there. The village name was first mentioned in existing historical records in 1518 as "Kedelwigh". The first element is ketill which means "kettle" or helmet. The last element is vík which means "bay" or "cove". Thus, the meaning of the name is then: "kettle bay".
