= Duksfjorden =

Fjord in Nordkapp, Norway

Duksfjorden (Norwegian)
- Diksovuotna (Northern Sami)
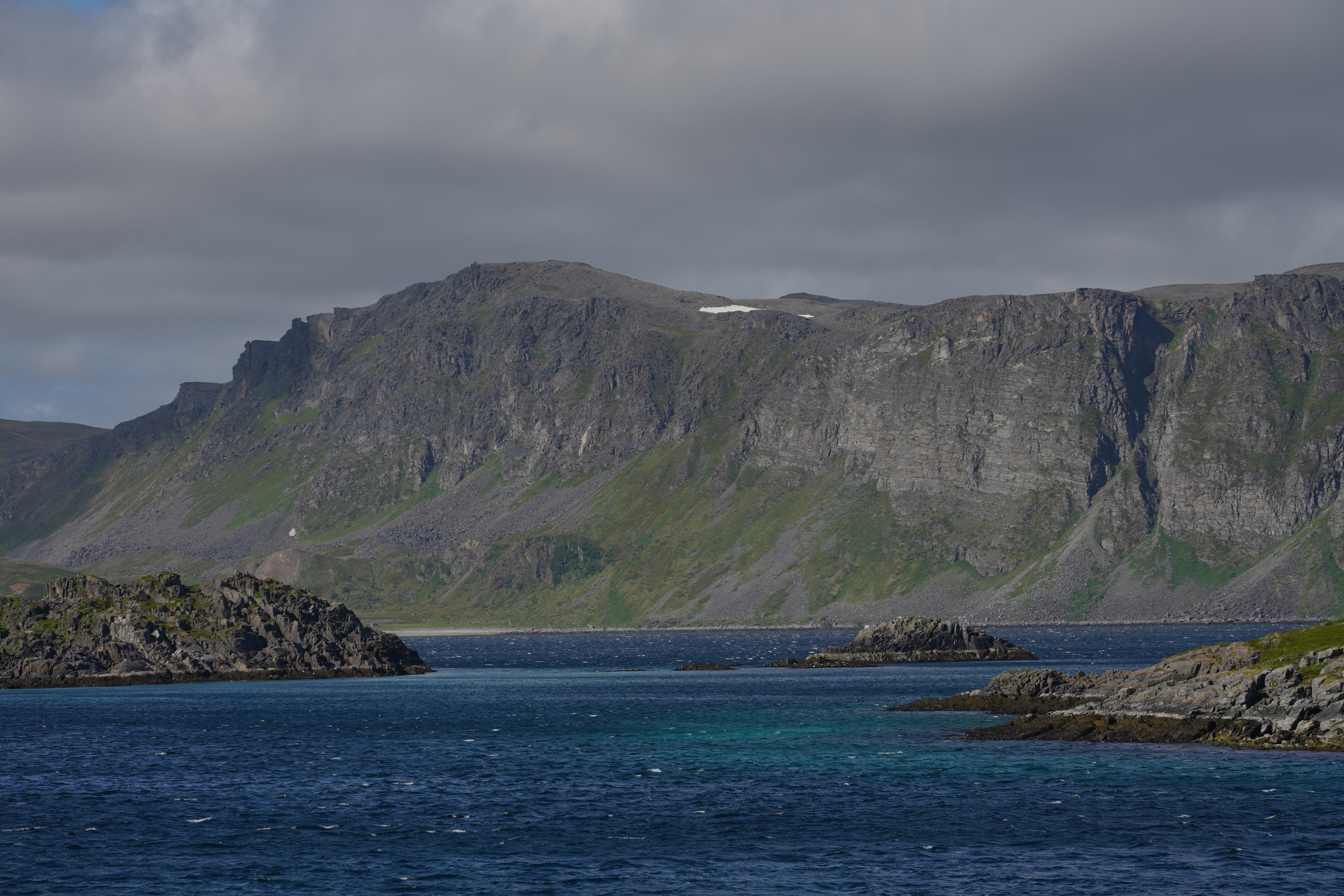
- View of the fjord
- Interactive map of Duksfjorden (Norwegian)
- Location: Finnmark county, Norway
- Coordinates: 71.0698°N 25.8797°E
- Type: Fjord
- Primary outflows: Kamøyfjorden
- Basin countries: Norway
- Max. length: 5.5 kilometres (3.4 mi)
- Max. width: 2.7 kilometres (1.7 mi)
- Max. depth: 110 metres (360 ft)

Duksfjorden (Northern Sami: Diksovuotna) is a fjord arm that branches off the main Kamøyfjorden on the eastern side of the island of Magerøya in Nordkapp Municipality in Finnmark county, Norway.

The mouth of the inlet spans between Bryggnæringen in the north and the island of Store Kamøya in the south. The fjord extends about 5.5 kilometres (3.4 mi) west to the end of the fjord. The fjord reaches a depth of about 110 metres (360 ft) at its deepest point at the outer reaches of the fjord. Just beside Store Kamøya lies the island of Lille Kamøya and south of this lies the village of Kamøyvær.

== Risfjorden ==
Between the island of Magerøya itself and Lille Kamøya, the little fjord of Risfjorden branches off the Duksfjorden and runs south, past Kamøyvær and the hamlet of Kuvika.

== See also ==
- List of Norwegian fjords
