= Nordkapp Municipality =

Municipality in Finnmark, Norway

Nordkapp Municipality Nordkapp kommune Davvinjárgga gielda (Northern Sami) Kappan komuuni (Kven)
- Municipality
- Kjelvik herred (historic name)
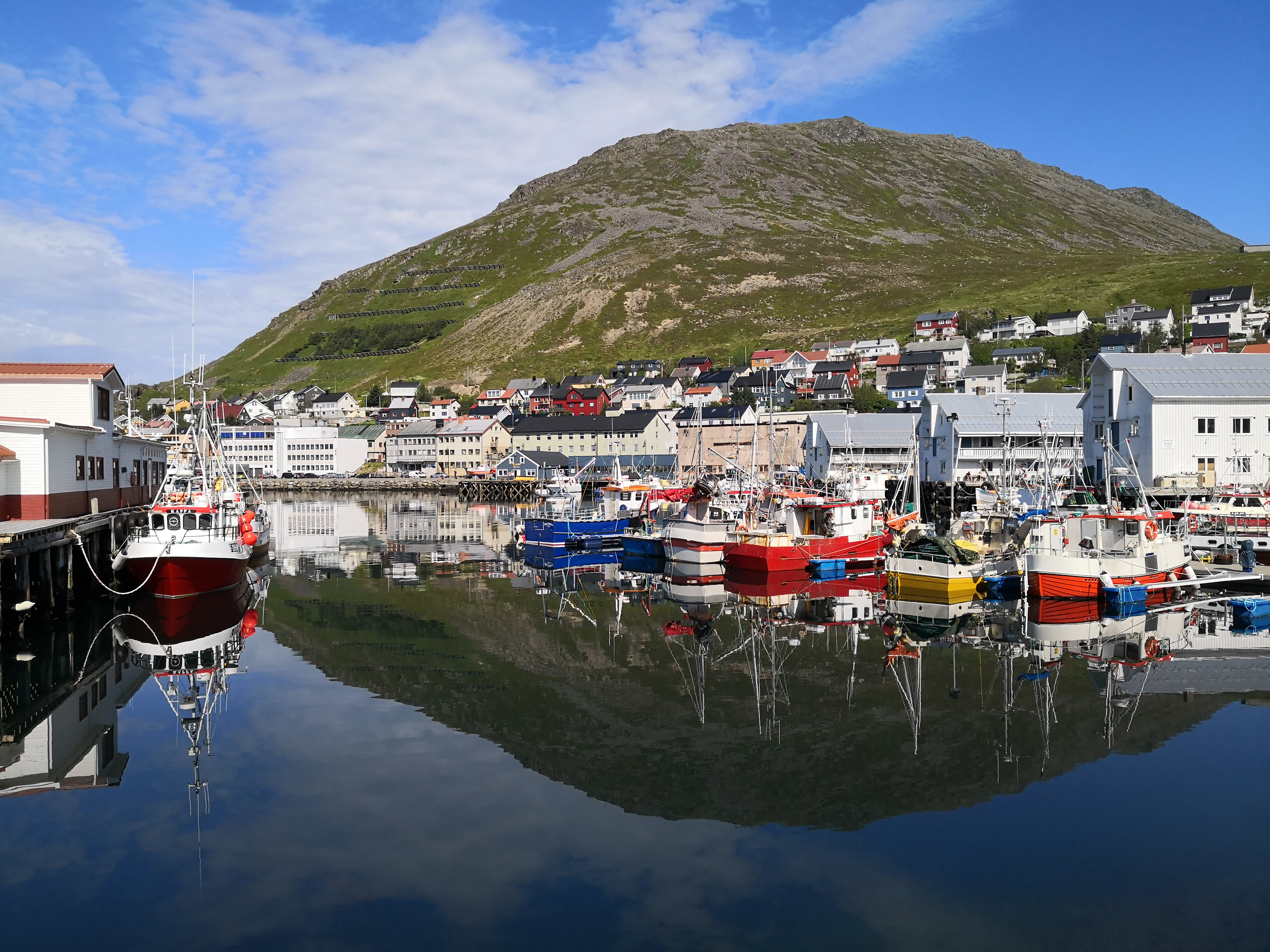
- Honningsvåg harbour

- Flag Coat of arms

- Finnmark within Norway

- Nordkapp within Finnmark
- Coordinates: 70°58′41″N 25°58′29″E
- Country: Norway
- County: Finnmark
- District: Vest-Finnmark
- Established: 1 July 1861
  - Preceded by: Kistrand Municipality
- Administrative centre: Honningsvåg

Government
  - Mayor (2023): Jan Morten (Ap)

Area
  - Total: 926.59 km^{2} (357.76 sq mi)
  - Land: 892.00 km^{2} (344.40 sq mi)
  - Water: 34.59 km^{2} (13.36 sq mi) 3.7%
  - Rank: #127 in Norway
- Highest elevation: 578 m (1,896 ft)

Population (2024)
  - Total: 2,951
  - Rank: #231 in Norway
  - Density: 3.2/km^{2} (8.3/sq mi)
  - Change (10 years): ▼ −8.2%
- Demonym: Nordkappværing

Official language
  - Norwegian form: Neutral
- Time zone: UTC+01:00 (CET)
  - Summer (DST): UTC+02:00 (CEST)
- ISO 3166 code: NO-5620
- Website: Official website

Nordkapp (English: North Cape; Northern Sami: Davvinjárga or Nordkáhppa; Kven: Kappa or Nordkappa) is a municipality in Finnmark county, Norway. The administrative centre of the municipality is the town of Honningsvåg, where most residents live. Other settlements in Nordkapp include the villages of Gjesvær, Kåfjord, Kamøyvær, Kjelvik, Nordvågen, Repvåg, Skarsvåg, and Valan.

The 927-square-kilometre (358 sq mi) municipality is the 127th largest by area out of the 357 municipalities in Norway. Nordkapp is the 231st most populous municipality in Norway with a population of 2,951. The municipality's population density is 3.2 inhabitants per square kilometre (8.3/sq mi) and its population has decreased by 8.2% over the previous 10-year period.

Around 200,000 tourists visit Nordkapp annually during the two to three months of summer. The main tourist attractions are the North Cape and the nearby Knivskjellodden. The North Cape first became famous when the English explorer Richard Chancellor rounded it in 1553 while attempting to find a sea route through the Northeast Passage. Helnes Lighthouse is located at the entrance to the Porsangerfjorden.

== General information ==
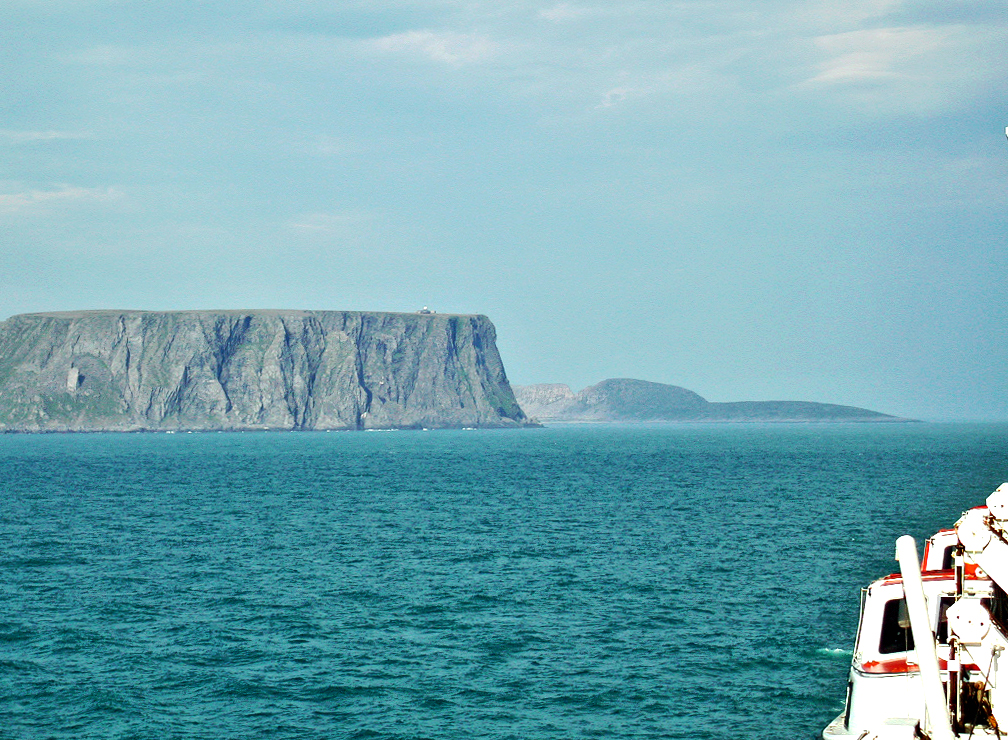
Nordkapp and Knivskjellodden

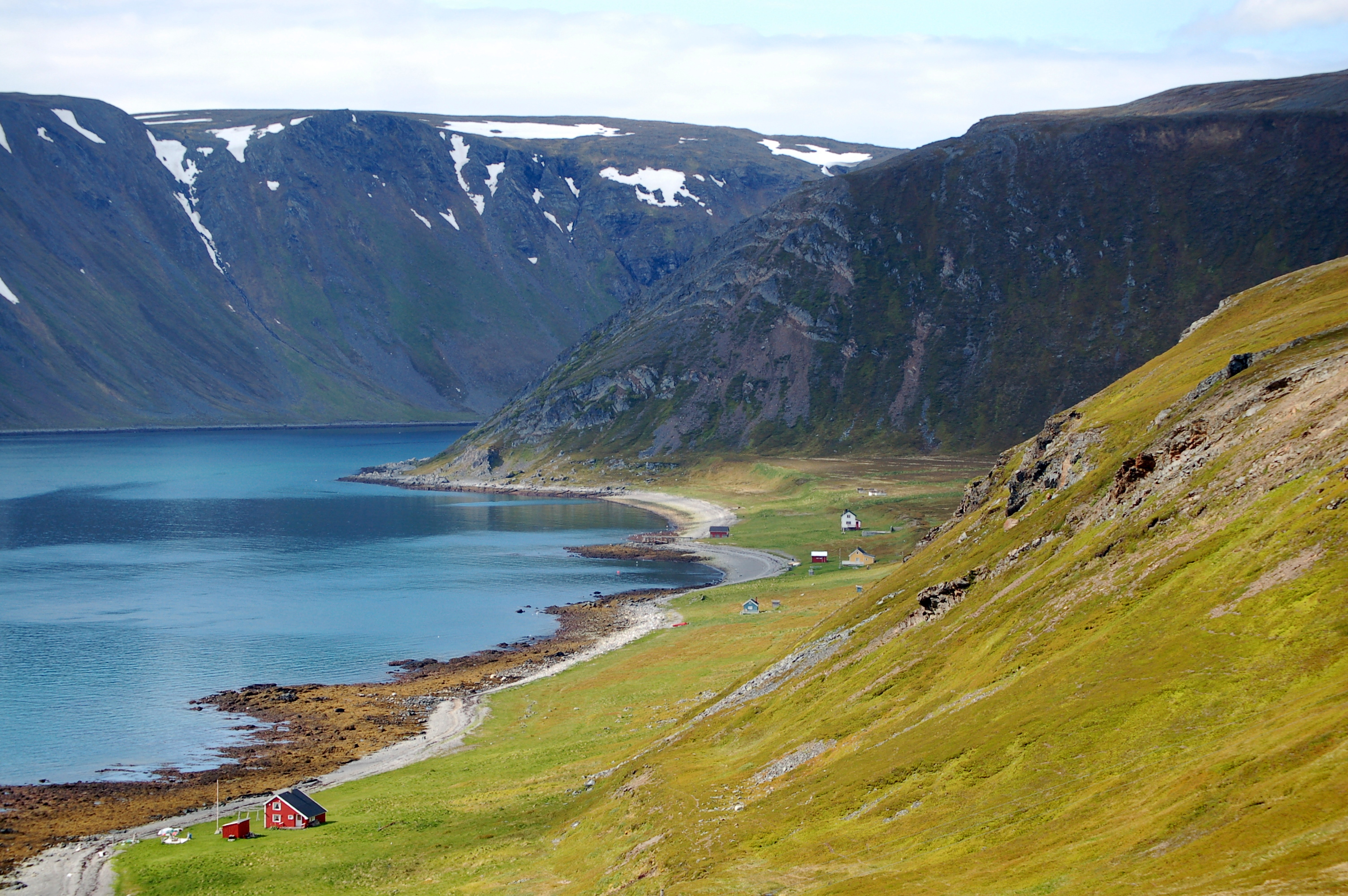
Gullgammen near North Cape

This municipality was established on 1 July 1861 when the northern district of Kistrand Municipality was separated to form the new Kjelvik Municipality. Initially, the new municipality encompassed the land on both sides of the northern end of the Porsangerfjorden, including the eastern part of the island of Magerøya, and it had a population of 345. The name of the municipality was changed from Kjelvik to Nordkapp in 1950. On 1 January 1984, the western part of the island of Magerøya as well as the small surrounding islands of Gjesværstappan (population: 240) were transferred from Måsøy Municipality to Nordkapp Municipality.

On 1 January 2020, the municipality became part of the newly formed Troms og Finnmark county. Previously, it had been part of the old Finnmark county. On 1 January 2024, the Troms og Finnmark county was divided and the municipality once again became part of Finnmark county.

=== Name ===
The municipality (originally the parish) was named after the old Kjelvik farm (Old Norse: Ketilvík) since the first Kjelvik Church was built there. The first element is derived from the word ketill which means "helmet" or "kettle". The last element is vík which means "cove" or "bay". The municipality was originally named Kjelvik, but that village was totally destroyed by the Germans in 1944 and it was never rebuilt. As a consequence of this, on 8 July 1949, a royal resolution changed the name of the municipality to Nordkapp effective on 1 January 1950. Nordkapp is a Norwegianized form of the English name North Cape by which the area was historically known dating back to at least 1553. The Old Norse name of the cape was Knyskanes.

=== Coat of arms ===
The coat of arms was granted on 19 October 1973. The official blazon is "Per fess angeled Or and gules" (Norwegian: Delt av gull og rødt ved enkelt venstre trappesnitt). This means the arms have a field (background) that is divided by an angeled line. Above the line the field has a tincture of Or which means it is commonly colored yellow, but if it is made out of metal, then gold is used. Below the line, the field has a tincture of gules (red). The arms are designed to look like a simplified silhouette of the North Cape, a large cliff in Nordkapp Municipality that is traditionally taken to be the northernmost point in Norway and of the European continent. The red and yellow colors are meant to show the sea under a golden sky representing the midnight sun. The arms were designed by Hallvard Trætteberg.

=== Churches ===
The Church of Norway has one parish (sokn) within Nordkapp Municipality. It is part of the Hammerfest prosti (deanery) in the Diocese of Nord-Hålogaland.

Churches in Nordkapp Municipality
| Parish (sokn) | Church name | Location of the church | Year built |
|---|---|---|---|
| Nordkapp | Gjesvær Chapel | Gjesvær | 1960 |
| Nordkapp | Honningsvåg Church | Honningsvåg | 1885 |
| Nordkapp | Repvåg Chapel | Repvåg | 1967 |
| Nordkapp | Skarsvåg Church | Skarsvåg | 1961 |

== Government ==
Nordkapp Municipality is responsible for primary education (through 10th grade), outpatient health services, senior citizen services, welfare and other social services, zoning, economic development, and municipal roads and utilities. The municipality is governed by a municipal council of directly elected representatives. The mayor is indirectly elected by a vote of the municipal council. The municipality is under the jurisdiction of the Vestre Finnmark District Court and the Hålogaland Court of Appeal.

=== Municipal council ===
The municipal council (Kommunestyre) of Nordkapp Municipality is made up of 19 representatives that are elected to four year terms. The tables below show the current and historical composition of the council by political party.

Nordkapp kommunestyre 2023–2027
| Party name (in Norwegian) | Number of representatives |
|---|---|
| Labour Party (Arbeiderpartiet) | 6 |
| Conservative Party (Høyre) | 5 |
| Centre Party (Senterpartiet) | 2 |
| Socialist Left Party (Sosialistisk Venstreparti) | 6 |
| Total number of members: | 19 |

Nordkapp kommunestyre 2019–2023
| Party name (in Norwegian) | Number of representatives |
|---|---|
| Labour Party (Arbeiderpartiet) | 3 |
| Conservative Party (Høyre) | 3 |
| Centre Party (Senterpartiet) | 6 |
| Socialist Left Party (Sosialistisk Venstreparti) | 7 |
| Total number of members: | 19 |

Nordkapp kommunestyre 2015–2019
| Party name (in Norwegian) | Number of representatives |
|---|---|
| Labour Party (Arbeiderpartiet) | 10 |
| Conservative Party (Høyre) | 4 |
| Socialist Left Party (Sosialistisk Venstreparti) | 3 |
| Liberal Party (Venstre) | 2 |
| Total number of members: | 19 |

Nordkapp kommunestyre 2011–2015
| Party name (in Norwegian) | Number of representatives |
|---|---|
| Labour Party (Arbeiderpartiet) | 9 |
| Progress Party (Fremskrittspartiet) | 1 |
| Conservative Party (Høyre) | 4 |
| Socialist Left Party (Sosialistisk Venstreparti) | 5 |
| Total number of members: | 19 |

Nordkapp kommunestyre 2007–2011
| Party name (in Norwegian) | Number of representatives |
|---|---|
| Labour Party (Arbeiderpartiet) | 8 |
| Progress Party (Fremskrittspartiet) | 3 |
| Conservative Party (Høyre) | 3 |
| Coastal Party (Kystpartiet) | 1 |
| Centre Party (Senterpartiet) | 2 |
| Socialist Left Party (Sosialistisk Venstreparti) | 8 |
| Total number of members: | 25 |

Nordkapp kommunestyre 2003–2007
| Party name (in Norwegian) | Number of representatives |
|---|---|
| Labour Party (Arbeiderpartiet) | 12 |
| Conservative Party (Høyre) | 3 |
| Coastal Party (Kystpartiet) | 3 |
| Centre Party (Senterpartiet) | 2 |
| Socialist Left Party (Sosialistisk Venstreparti) | 5 |
| Total number of members: | 25 |

Nordkapp kommunestyre 1999–2003
| Party name (in Norwegian) | Number of representatives |
|---|---|
| Labour Party (Arbeiderpartiet) | 11 |
| Conservative Party (Høyre) | 8 |
| Centre Party (Senterpartiet) | 1 |
| Socialist Left Party (Sosialistisk Venstreparti) | 5 |
| Total number of members: | 25 |

Nordkapp kommunestyre 1995–1999
| Party name (in Norwegian) | Number of representatives |
|---|---|
| Labour Party (Arbeiderpartiet) | 16 |
| Conservative Party (Høyre) | 4 |
| Centre Party (Senterpartiet) | 2 |
| Socialist Left Party (Sosialistisk Venstreparti) | 3 |
| Total number of members: | 25 |

Nordkapp kommunestyre 1991–1995
| Party name (in Norwegian) | Number of representatives |
|---|---|
| Labour Party (Arbeiderpartiet) | 14 |
| Progress Party (Fremskrittspartiet) | 1 |
| Conservative Party (Høyre) | 3 |
| Christian Democratic Party (Kristelig Folkeparti) | 1 |
| Socialist Left Party (Sosialistisk Venstreparti) | 6 |
| Nordkapp Independents List (Nordkapp Uavhengige List) | 4 |
| Total number of members: | 29 |

Nordkapp kommunestyre 1987–1991
| Party name (in Norwegian) | Number of representatives |
|---|---|
| Labour Party (Arbeiderpartiet) | 16 |
| Conservative Party (Høyre) | 6 |
| Christian Democratic Party (Kristelig Folkeparti) | 1 |
| Socialist Left Party (Sosialistisk Venstreparti) | 6 |
| Total number of members: | 29 |

Nordkapp kommunestyre 1983–1987
| Party name (in Norwegian) | Number of representatives |
|---|---|
| Labour Party (Arbeiderpartiet) | 19 |
| Conservative Party (Høyre) | 6 |
| Christian Democratic Party (Kristelig Folkeparti) | 1 |
| Socialist Left Party (Sosialistisk Venstreparti) | 3 |
| Total number of members: | 29 |

Nordkapp kommunestyre 1979–1983
| Party name (in Norwegian) | Number of representatives |
|---|---|
| Labour Party (Arbeiderpartiet) | 15 |
| Conservative Party (Høyre) | 8 |
| Christian Democratic Party (Kristelig Folkeparti) | 2 |
| Centre Party (Senterpartiet) | 1 |
| Socialist Left Party (Sosialistisk Venstreparti) | 3 |
| Total number of members: | 29 |

Nordkapp kommunestyre 1975–1979
| Party name (in Norwegian) | Number of representatives |
|---|---|
| Labour Party (Arbeiderpartiet) | 16 |
| Conservative Party (Høyre) | 5 |
| Christian Democratic Party (Kristelig Folkeparti) | 2 |
| Centre Party (Senterpartiet) | 1 |
| Socialist Left Party (Sosialistisk Venstreparti) | 5 |
| Total number of members: | 29 |

Nordkapp kommunestyre 1971–1975
| Party name (in Norwegian) | Number of representatives |
|---|---|
| Labour Party (Arbeiderpartiet) | 18 |
| Conservative Party (Høyre) | 6 |
| Christian Democratic Party (Kristelig Folkeparti) | 1 |
| Socialist common list (Venstresosialistiske felleslister) | 4 |
| Total number of members: | 29 |

Nordkapp kommunestyre 1967–1971
| Party name (in Norwegian) | Number of representatives |
|---|---|
| Labour Party (Arbeiderpartiet) | 18 |
| Conservative Party (Høyre) | 6 |
| Communist Party (Kommunistiske Parti) | 2 |
| Christian Democratic Party (Kristelig Folkeparti) | 1 |
| Socialist People's Party (Sosialistisk Folkeparti) | 2 |
| Total number of members: | 29 |

Nordkapp kommunestyre 1963–1967
| Party name (in Norwegian) | Number of representatives |
|---|---|
| Labour Party (Arbeiderpartiet) | 18 |
| Conservative Party (Høyre) | 6 |
| Communist Party (Kommunistiske Parti) | 4 |
| Christian Democratic Party (Kristelig Folkeparti) | 1 |
| Total number of members: | 29 |

Nordkapp herredsstyre 1959–1963
| Party name (in Norwegian) | Number of representatives |
|---|---|
| Labour Party (Arbeiderpartiet) | 15 |
| Conservative Party (Høyre) | 7 |
| Communist Party (Kommunistiske Parti) | 7 |
| Total number of members: | 29 |

Nordkapp herredsstyre 1955–1959
| Party name (in Norwegian) | Number of representatives |
|---|---|
| Labour Party (Arbeiderpartiet) | 14 |
| Conservative Party (Høyre) | 5 |
| Communist Party (Kommunistiske Parti) | 9 |
| Local List(s) (Lokale lister) | 1 |
| Total number of members: | 29 |

Nordkapp herredsstyre 1951–1955
| Party name (in Norwegian) | Number of representatives |
|---|---|
| Labour Party (Arbeiderpartiet) | 11 |
| Communist Party (Kommunistiske Parti) | 10 |
| Joint List(s) of Non-Socialist Parties (Borgerlige Felleslister) | 7 |
| Total number of members: | 28 |

Kjelvik herredsstyre 1945–1947
| Party name (in Norwegian) | Number of representatives |
|---|---|
| Labour Party (Arbeiderpartiet) | 6 |
| Communist Party (Kommunistiske Parti) | 11 |
| Local List(s) (Lokale lister) | 3 |
| Total number of members: | 20 |

Kjelvik herredsstyre 1937–1941*
| Party name (in Norwegian) | Number of representatives |
|---|---|
| Labour Party (Arbeiderpartiet) | 9 |
| Communist Party (Kommunistiske Parti) | 6 |
| Local List(s) (Lokale lister) | 7 |
| Total number of members: | 20 |
Note: Due to the German occupation of Norway during World War II, no elections were held for new municipal councils until after the war ended in 1945.

=== Mayors ===
The mayor (Norwegian: ordfører) of Nordkapp Municipality is the political leader of the municipality and the chairperson of the municipal council. Here is a list of people who have held this position:

- 1861–1865: Jørgen Wiig
- 1865–1871: Karesius Løkke
- 1869–1870: Olaf Bull
- 1871–1873: Martin Berg
- 1873–1875: Carl Berg
- 1875–1877: Kristian Hansen
- 1877–1879: Martin Berg
- 1879–1889: Emil Simonsen
- 1889–1895: Johannes Aas
- 1897–1907: Lars Berg
- 1908–1916: Waldemar Larssen (FV)
- 1917–1922: Ole Grøtta
- 1923–1925: Fredrik Bull
- 1926–1928: John Bruun
- 1929–1931: Haakon H. Bartnæs
- 1931–1934: Alfred Vågnes (NKP)
- 1935–1937: Magnus Steinholdt
- 1937–1937: Amandus Kræmmervik
- 1938–1941: Erling Andreassen (Ap)
- 1941–1944: Peder J. Berg (NS)
- 1945–1946: Erling Andreassen (Ap)
- 1946–1947: Rudolf Andreassen (NKP)
- 1947–1967: Erling Andreassen (Ap)
- 1968–1979: Halfdan Berge (Ap)
- 1979–1991: Odd Holmgren (Ap)
- 1991–1999: Hans Arvid Hansen (Ap)
- 1999–2003: Bernt-Aksel Jensen (Ap)
- 2003–2007: Ulf Syversen (Ap)
- 2007–2019: Kristina Hansen (Ap)
- 2019–2022: Jan Olsen (SV)
- 2022–2023: Trudy Engen (SV)
- 2023–present: Jan Morten (Ap)

== Geography ==
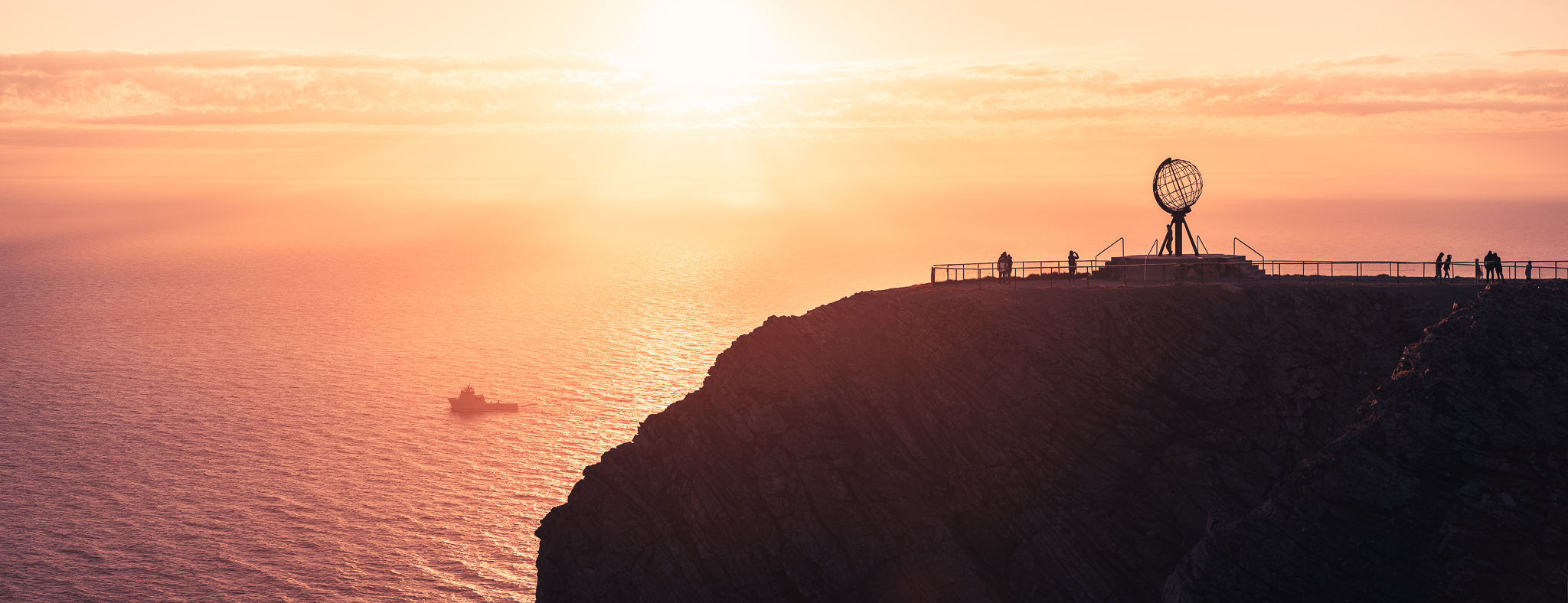
Falaise du cap nord touristique

The municipality encompasses the island of Magerøya, but also parts of the mainland on the Porsanger Peninsula and Sværholt Peninsula on both sides of the Porsangerfjorden. There are many other fjords in the municipality including Duksfjorden, Kåfjorden, Kamøyfjorden, and Skipsfjorden. The main island is Magerøya and there are a few islands located around Magerøya including Gjesvær, Gjesværstappan, Lille Kamøya, and Store Kamøya. The highest point in the municipality is the 578-metre (1,896 ft) tall Savzavárri.

=== North Cape ===
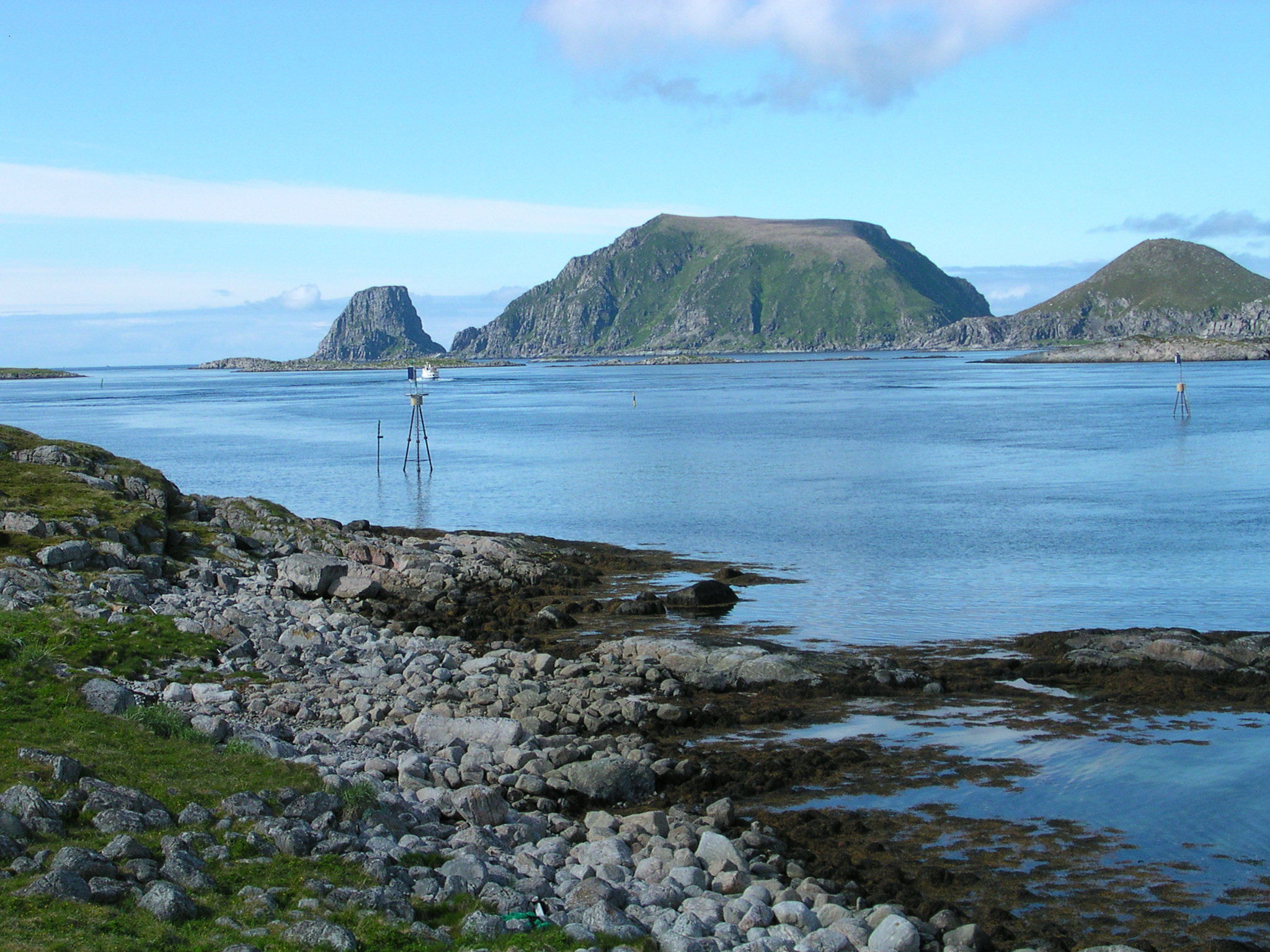
View towards Gjesværstappan islands with seabird colonies

The municipality is named after Nordkapp (North Cape), a 307-metre-high (1,007 ft) cliff that is commonly referred to as the northernmost point of Europe. However, the true northernmost point of the European mainland is Cape Nordkinn (Kinnarodden), at 71° 08′ 02″ N, located about 20 kilometres (12 mi) from the village of Mehamn on the Nordkinn Peninsula. If Europe's northernmost point is allowed to be on an island, then it still is not the North Cape. It would be Cape Fligely on Rudolf Island, Franz Josef Land in Russia, which is located much further north at 81° 48′ 24″ N. If Franz Josef Land is not considered to be in Europe, then Europe's northernmost point is the northern point of the island of Rossøya, an islet in Svalbard, north of Spitsbergen at 80° 49′ 44.41″ N.

=== Birdlife ===
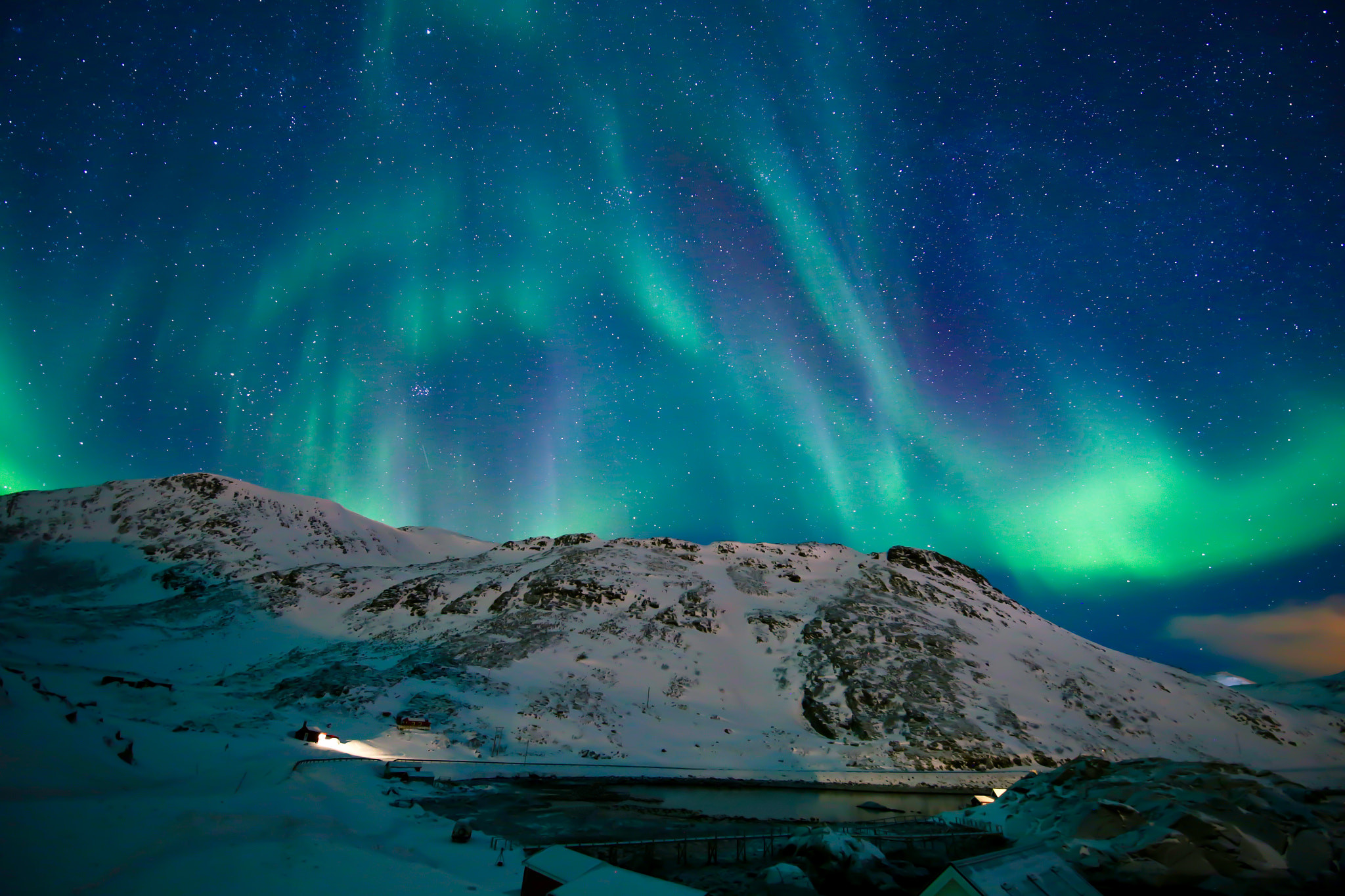
Aurora near Honningsvåg

This coastal municipality is like many others in Finnmark, home of large seabird colonies. The island group known as Gjesværstappan is one of the better known with at least 2,500 pairs of razorbill. Away from the coast it is the typical tundra habitat of the region that dominates with lakes, marshes, and areas of willow scrub. Many of the lakes hold breeding wildfowl, with species like long-tailed duck being found.

=== Climate ===
The populated areas of Nordkapp municipality have a subarctic climate (Dfc) with long, moderately cold winters and short, cool summers. If February were slightly warmer it would be a subpolar oceanic climate (Cfc). The well known North Cape plateau (cliff) is at 307 m ASL and will be colder with a tundra climate.

Climate data for Nordkapp, (Note: Temperature, humidity and dew point from Honningsvåg Airport (14m), precipitation and extreme snow depth from Repvåg.) 1991–2020 normals, extremes 2002–present
| Month | Jan | Feb | Mar | Apr | May | Jun | Jul | Aug | Sep | Oct | Nov | Dec | Year |
|---|---|---|---|---|---|---|---|---|---|---|---|---|---|
| Record high °C (°F) | 6.8 (44.2) | 9.5 (49.1) | 9.8 (49.6) | 12.5 (54.5) | 20.1 (68.2) | 28.4 (83.1) | 27.1 (80.8) | 28 (82) | 21 (70) | 13.3 (55.9) | 9.2 (48.6) | 8.6 (47.5) | 28.4 (83.1) |
| Mean maximum °C (°F) | 4.9 (40.8) | 4.9 (40.8) | 4.9 (40.8) | 7.8 (46.0) | 13.7 (56.7) | 17.7 (63.9) | 22.6 (72.7) | 20.2 (68.4) | 15.7 (60.3) | 10.5 (50.9) | 7.1 (44.8) | 6.2 (43.2) | 22.9 (73.2) |
| Mean daily maximum °C (°F) | −0.5 (31.1) | −1.0 (30.2) | 0.4 (32.7) | 3.0 (37.4) | 6.8 (44.2) | 9.6 (49.3) | 13.4 (56.1) | 12.7 (54.9) | 10.2 (50.4) | 5.6 (42.1) | 2.8 (37.0) | 1.4 (34.5) | 5.4 (41.7) |
| Daily mean °C (°F) | −2.5 (27.5) | −3.3 (26.1) | −1.7 (28.9) | 0.7 (33.3) | 4.2 (39.6) | 6.9 (44.4) | 10.2 (50.4) | 10.2 (50.4) | 8.0 (46.4) | 3.8 (38.8) | 0.7 (33.3) | −0.8 (30.6) | 3.0 (37.4) |
| Mean daily minimum °C (°F) | −4.8 (23.4) | −5.2 (22.6) | −3.4 (25.9) | −0.9 (30.4) | 2.6 (36.7) | 5.5 (41.9) | 8.6 (47.5) | 8.6 (47.5) | 6.5 (43.7) | 2.3 (36.1) | −0.9 (30.4) | −2.7 (27.1) | 1.3 (34.3) |
| Mean minimum °C (°F) | −10.7 (12.7) | −10.6 (12.9) | −8.5 (16.7) | −6.0 (21.2) | −1.5 (29.3) | 1.5 (34.7) | 5.3 (41.5) | 5.0 (41.0) | 2.6 (36.7) | −2.8 (27.0) | −5.6 (21.9) | −8.3 (17.1) | −12.5 (9.5) |
| Record low °C (°F) | −15.3 (4.5) | −17.2 (1.0) | −11.0 (12.2) | −10.0 (14.0) | −5.7 (21.7) | 0.0 (32.0) | 0.0 (32.0) | 1.0 (33.8) | 0.0 (32.0) | −5.6 (21.9) | −11.3 (11.7) | −21.2 (−6.2) | −21.2 (−6.2) |
| Average precipitation mm (inches) | 55 (2.2) | 39 (1.5) | 51 (2.0) | 36 (1.4) | 42 (1.7) | 46 (1.8) | 48 (1.9) | 52 (2.0) | 64 (2.5) | 78 (3.1) | 50 (2.0) | 63 (2.5) | 627 (24.7) |
| Average extreme snow depth cm (inches) | 61 (24) | 60 (24) | 59 (23) | 64 (25) | 32 (13) | 0 (0) | 0 (0) | 0 (0) | 1 (0.4) | 31 (12) | 31 (12) | 32 (13) | 75 (30) |
| Average precipitation days (≥ 1.0 mm) | 9 | 7 | 10 | 8 | 7 | 7 | 7 | 6 | 7 | 10 | 7 | 8 | 94 |
| Average relative humidity (%) | 78 | 78 | 76 | 75 | 72 | 77 | 79 | 79 | 78 | 79 | 79 | 78 | 77 |
| Average dew point °C (°F) | −6.0 (21.2) | −6.6 (20.1) | −5.4 (22.3) | −2.9 (26.8) | 0.2 (32.4) | 3.5 (38.3) | 7.1 (44.8) | 6.8 (44.2) | 4.9 (40.8) | 0.7 (33.3) | −2.2 (28.0) | −3.9 (25.0) | −0.3 (31.5) |
Source 1: Norwegian Meteorological Institute
Source 2: yr.no /Norwegian Meteorological Institute

Climate data for Helnes Lighthouse 1961-90
| Month | Jan | Feb | Mar | Apr | May | Jun | Jul | Aug | Sep | Oct | Nov | Dec | Year |
|---|---|---|---|---|---|---|---|---|---|---|---|---|---|
| Mean daily maximum °C (°F) | −1.5 (29.3) | −1.6 (29.1) | −0.7 (30.7) | 1.4 (34.5) | 5.2 (41.4) | 9.3 (48.7) | 12.6 (54.7) | 11.8 (53.2) | 8.6 (47.5) | 4.5 (40.1) | 1.5 (34.7) | −0.5 (31.1) | 4.2 (39.6) |
| Daily mean °C (°F) | −3.6 (25.5) | −3.6 (25.5) | −2.4 (27.7) | −0.2 (31.6) | 3.4 (38.1) | 6.9 (44.4) | 10.1 (50.2) | 9.7 (49.5) | 6.9 (44.4) | 3.0 (37.4) | −0.2 (31.6) | −2.4 (27.7) | 2.3 (36.1) |
| Mean daily minimum °C (°F) | −5.7 (21.7) | −5.7 (21.7) | −4.2 (24.4) | −1.8 (28.8) | 1.6 (34.9) | 5.0 (41.0) | 8.0 (46.4) | 8.0 (46.4) | 5.4 (41.7) | 1.5 (34.7) | −2.0 (28.4) | −4.3 (24.3) | 0.5 (32.9) |
| Average precipitation mm (inches) | 94 (3.7) | 75 (3.0) | 67 (2.6) | 59 (2.3) | 42 (1.7) | 40 (1.6) | 44 (1.7) | 50 (2.0) | 59 (2.3) | 83 (3.3) | 82 (3.2) | 101 (4.0) | 796 (31.3) |
| Average precipitation days (≥ 1 mm) | 18.1 | 15.3 | 14.6 | 13.6 | 10.6 | 9.6 | 9.3 | 10.5 | 13.9 | 17.5 | 16.5 | 18.7 | 168.2 |
Source: yr.no/Norwegian Meteorological Institute

== Transportation ==
Due to the heavy tourist traffic in the summers, Nordkapp has an extensive transportation infrastructure for such a small, remote municipality. The Honningsvåg Airport is located just north of the town of Honningsvåg, with daily connections to Tromsø. The European route E69 highway runs north throughout the municipality from Porsanger to the North Cape. The North Cape Tunnel connects the mainland to the island of Magerøya. The Honningsvåg Tunnel goes through a large mountain near Honningsvåg.

== Notable people ==
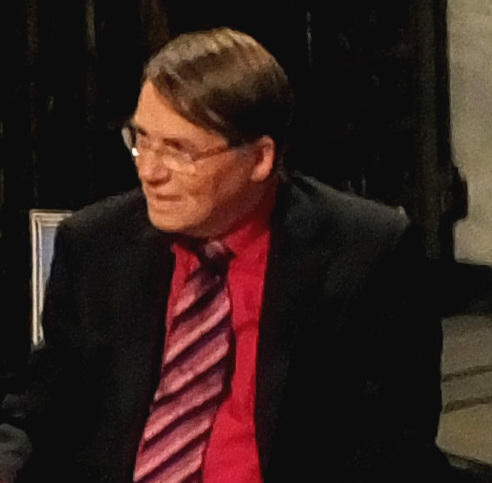
Gunnar Staalsett, 2014

- Thor With (1918 in Honningsvåg - 1987), a theologian and Bishop of the Diocese of Bjørgvin
- Terje Stigen (1922 on Magerøya – 2010), an author
- Idar Kristiansen (1932 in Honningsvåg – 1985), a poet, novelist, and short story writer
- Gunnar Stålsett (born 1935 in Nordkapp), a theologican and politician who was leader of the Centre Party and Bishop of Oslo
- Knut Erik Jensen (born 1940 in Honningsvåg), a film director
- Ingunn Utsi (born 1948 in Repvågstranda), a Sami sculptor, painter, and book illustrator
- John Arne Markussen (born 1953 in Repvåg), a journalist and newspaper editor
- Guri Berg (born 1963), a Norwegian artist and sculptor who grew up in Honningsvåg
- Ingeborg Arvola (born 1974 in Honningsvåg), a Norwegian novelist and children's writer
- William Frantzen (born 1993), a retired footballer who grew up in Honningsvåg
