= Honningsvåg Airport =

Honningsvåg Airport, Valan Honningsvåg lufthavn, Valan

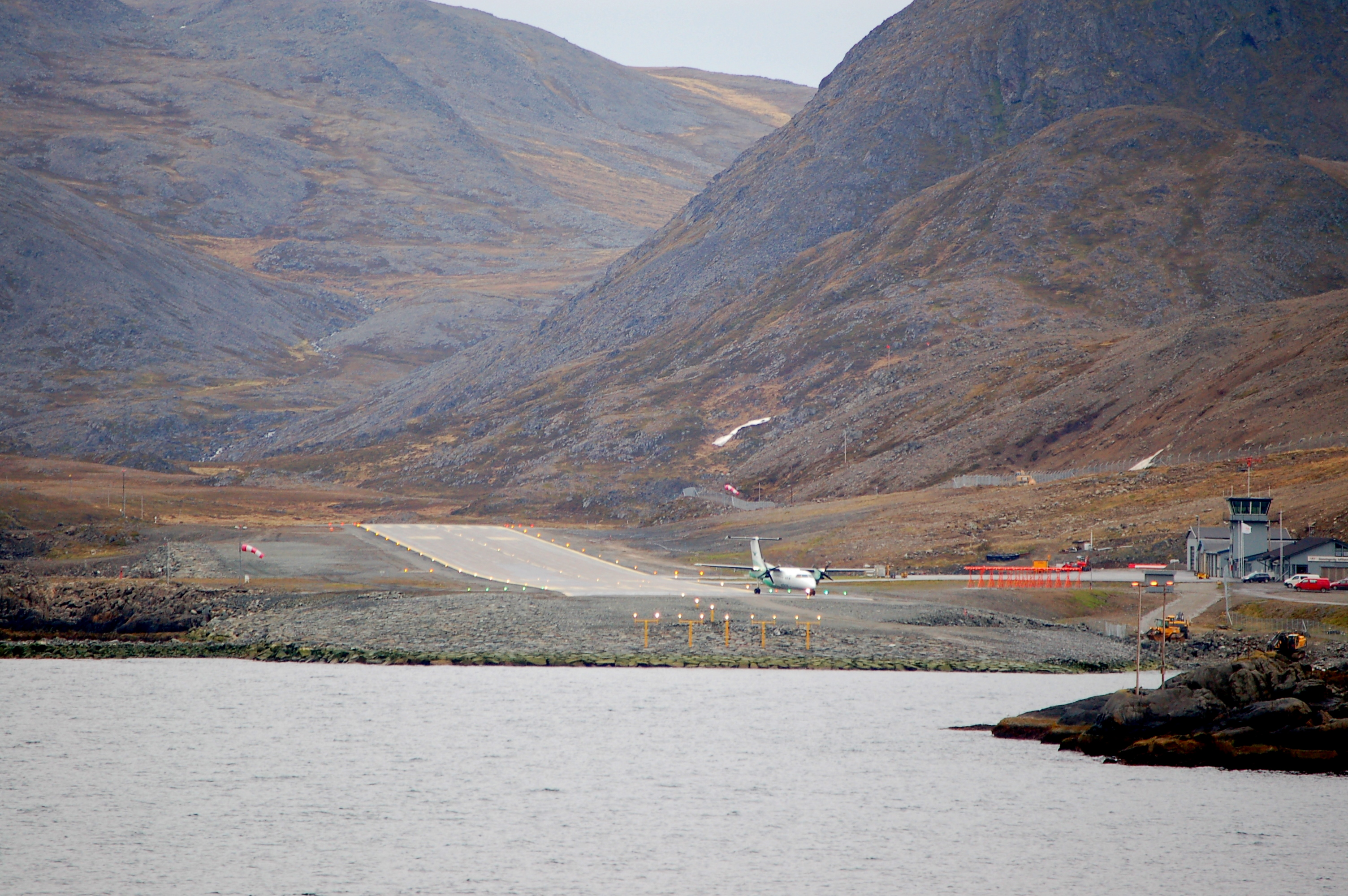
- IATA: HVG; ICAO: ENHV

Summary
- Airport type: Public
- Owner/Operator: Avinor
- Serves: Honningsvåg
- Location: Valan, Nordkapp Municipality, Finnmark, Norway
- Elevation AMSL: 14 m / 46 ft
- Coordinates: 71°00′35″N 25°59′01″E
- Website: avinor.no

Map

Runways
| Direction | Length | | Surface |
| Direction | m | ft | Surface |
|---|---|---|---|
| 08/26 | 880 | 2,887 | Asphalt |

Statistics (2014)
- Passengers: 13,487
- Aircraft movements: 2,274
- Cargo (tonnes): 55

Honningsvåg Airport, Valan (Norwegian: Honningsvåg lufthavn, Valan; IATA: HVG, ICAO: ENHV) is a regional airport serving Honningsvåg in Nordkapp Municipality, Norway. The airport is located at Valan, on the south side of Skipsfjorden, 4 kilometers (2 1/2 miles) north of the town, and 31 km (19 1/2 mi) from the North Cape. The airport has a 880-by-30-meter (2,887 by 98 ft) asphalt runway which is operated by the state-owned Avinor. Flights are operated by Widerøe to Tromsø with connecting flights to Oslo. The airline also flies to other communities within Finnmark, serving the airport with Dash 8-100 and Q200 aircraft. The airport handled 13,487 passengers in 2014.

Honningsvåg was served by a seaplane route in the late 1930s, but these never resumed after World War II. Valan Airport was planned as part of the construction of short take-off and landing airports in Finnmark, but did not open until 30 June 1977 because of the airport's difficult terrain and landing conditions. Widerøe originally served the airport using the de Havilland Canada Twin Otter and the de Havilland Canada Dash 7, until the Bombardier Dash 8 was introduced in 1995. The routes have since 1997 been subsidized through public service obligations. A new terminal opened in 1989. The opening of the North Cape Tunnel in 1999 has resulted in a decrease of traffic at the airport.

== History ==
The first flight in Nordkapp took place during the summer of 1926, when a German cruise ship SS Oceania used its on-board Junkers F-13 seaplane to fly tourists sightseeing. The second was Gidsken Jakobsen and John Strandrud who used their Junkers seaplane to fly sightseeing for cruise tourists. Jakobsen established Nord-Norges Aero and applied for concession for a Northern Norway route, but Parliament instead chose to support Norwegian Air Lines (DNL). Their Bergen–Tromsø route started in 1935 and the following year it was extended via Skjervøy and Hammerfest to Honningsvåg. The Finnmark route was subcontracted to Widerøe, who flew an average 54 kilograms (119 pounds) of mail per trip between 11 June and 12 August. The Finnmark route was not carried out in 1937, but reopened the following year. In both 1938 and 1939 was operated from 1 July to 30 August. The 1940 schedule was terminated because of the German occupation of Norway, although twice a week a service was introduced from Trondheim via Tromsø and Honnignsvåg to Kirkenes. This was the first winter flights and lasted until early 1941 when the pilots fled to the United Kingdom for military service.

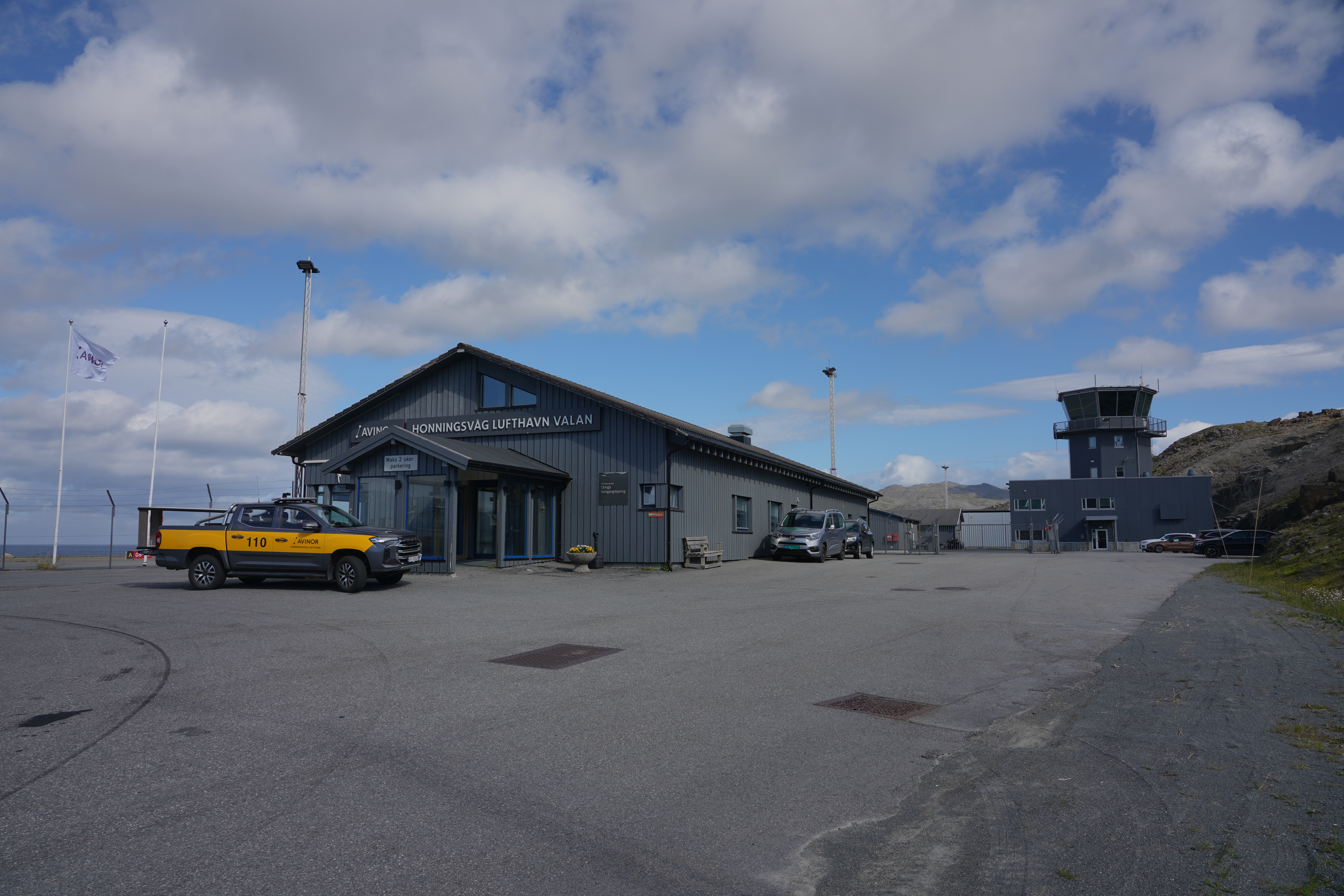
The terminal and tower

DNL assumed the Finnmark route in 1947, but dropped Honningsvåg from the schedule. The municipal council approved plans in 1948 to reestablish the water aerodrome, which had been destroyed in the German retreat in 1944. Despite several local initiatives from Nordkapp during the 1950s and 1960s, Honningsvåg was not included in the seaplane routes. Following the opening av Alta Airport and Lakselv Airport, Banak in 1963, Norving applied to operate a feeder service from Honningsvåg to Alta and Hammerfest, but the ministry was not willing to issue subsidies for such a route. At the time travel time from Honningsvåg to Oslo via Lakselv was ten hours. Various public committees look into better aviation services in Finnmark during the 1960s. One such alternative was to build a heliport. Instead the government opted for constructing short take-off and landing airfields. The first of these were constructed in Helgeland in 1968.

The ministry proposed in 1972 that six airports be built in northern Norway. The first five airports opened on 1 August 1974, but construction of Honningsvåg Airport was delayed. The reason was the difficult terrain and wind conditions and more time was needed to find a suitable site. In addition to Valan, sites at Kåfjord and Skarsvågfjellet was considered, in addition to the use of helicopters. Valan was chosen despite the poor conditions, which force approach to take place in a semi-circle. Construction cost 17.4 million Norwegian krone (NOK), of which NOK 15.8 million was covered by the state and the remainder by Nordkapp Municipality and Finnmark County Municipality. The airport opened on 30 June 1977; it was initially operated by the municipality with the state operating the air navigation services.

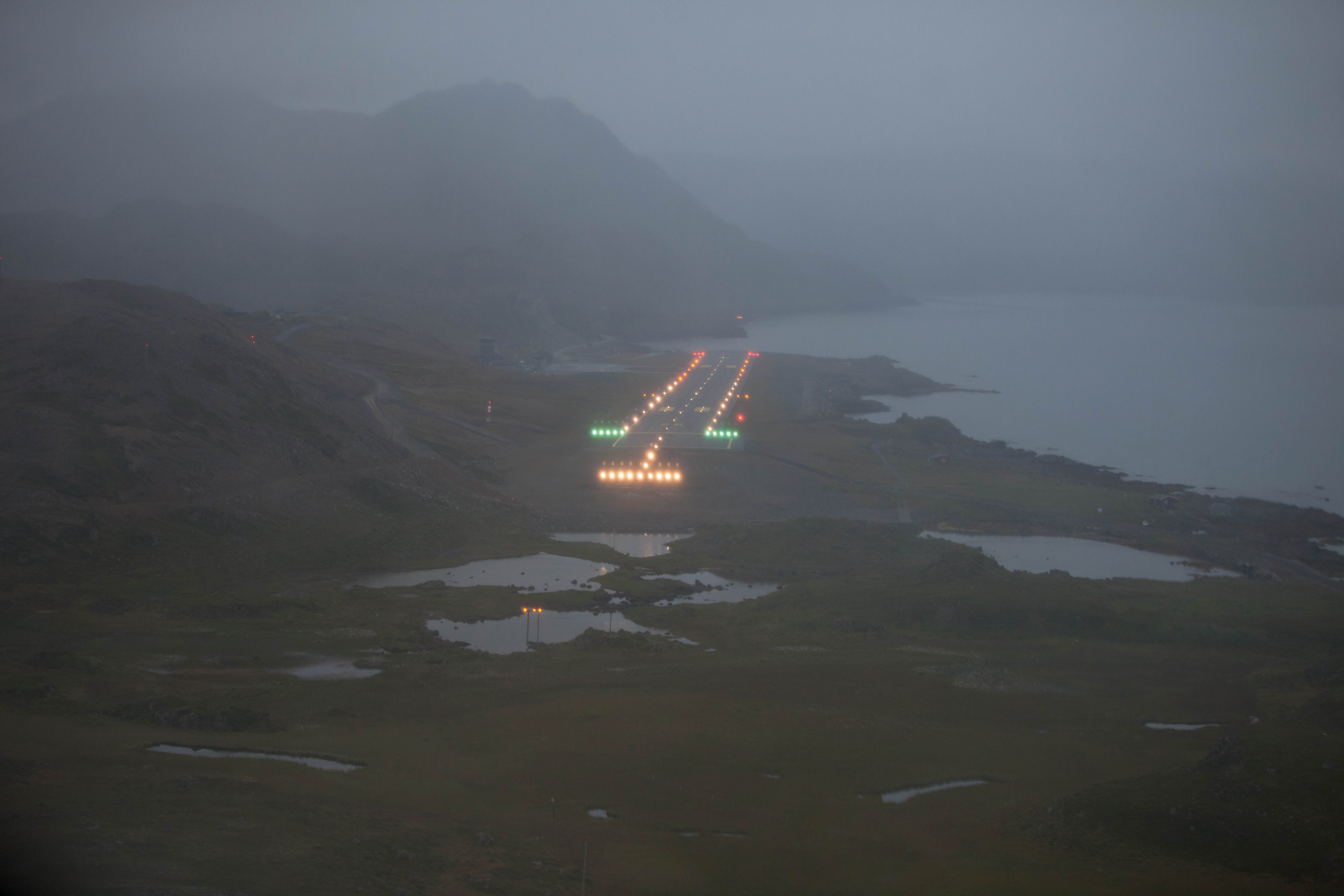
Approach at dusk

Widerøe originally served the airport with nineteen-seat Twin Otters, serving Honningsvåg up to six times per day. The airport allowed for a travel time of four and a half hours from Honningsvåg to Oslo. Annual ridership was 20,000 for the first twelve months; it peaked at 25,316 in 1986 before falling to 17,000 in 1993. A new terminal was built in 1989. Honningsvåg Airport has used the term "North Cape Airport" because of its vicinity to the North Cape. A dispute between Honningsvåg and Lakselv arose in 1996 when the latter started using the same term for their airport.

Widerøe introduced the Dash 8 in 1995 and from 1 January 1997 ownership and operations was taken over by the Civil Aviation Administration (later renamed Avinor). Flights to Honningsvåg have been subject to public service obligations since 1 April 1997. The North Cape Tunnel opened on 15 June 1999, providing a fixed link for Magerøya to the mainland. This resulted in a significant fall in traffic, which hit a record low 10,846 in 2005. Airport security was introduced on 1 January 2005. The safety areas were upgraded in 2010, followed by a new control tower in 2011.

== Future ==
After 2010 there are no new aircraft available for purchase with more than 19 seats which can use the 800-metre (2,600 ft) runways common in Norway. The presently used Dash 8-100 and Q200 aircraft are assumed to be retired around 2030. Honningsvåg is one of the airports where there is no room for runway extension. Considering the fairly low number of passengers, the plan is to use small planes.

== Facilities ==
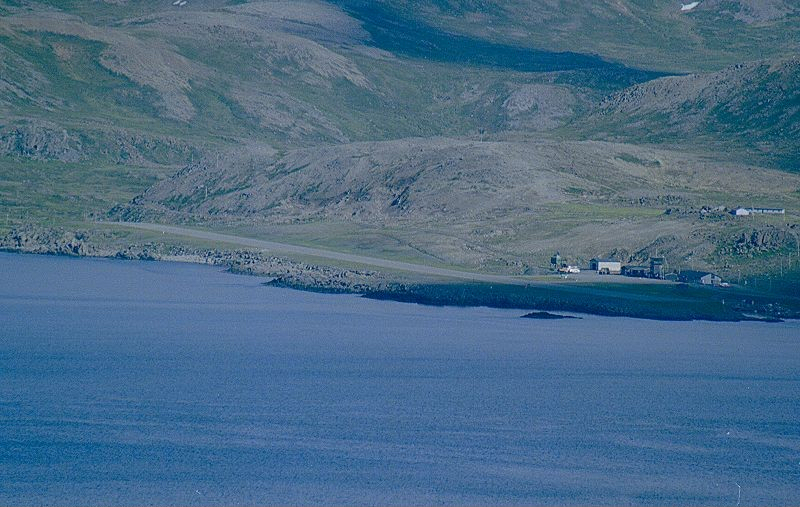
Aerial view of the airport in 2000

The airport is located at Valan, 4.5 km (2 3/4 mi) from Honningsvåg. The terminal has a capacity for 150 passengers per hour. The airport resides at an elevation of 14 m (46 ft) above mean sea level. The runway is designated 08/26 and has an asphalt surface measuring 880 by 30 m (2,887 by 98 ft). The difficult terrain and wind conditions force aircraft to approach the airport in a semi-circle in both directions. The limited space also makes it impossible to extend the runway. Thirteen people worked at the airport as of 2008.

== Airlines and destinations ==
Honningsvåg is served by Widerøe, which operates Dash 8 (100 and Q200) aircraft to Tromsø and to some other communities in Finnmark. The routes are operated as public service obligations financed by the Ministry of Transport and Communications. The airport served 13,487 passengers, 2,274 aircraft movements and handled 55 tonnes of cargo in 2014.

Widerøe cooperate with SAS, Norwegian, Finnair and Lufthansa on connecting flights. The total flight time from Honningsvåg to Oslo, via Tromsø, is 3:45 hours.

Honningsvåg falls partially within the catchment area of Alta Airport, which is 205 km (127 mi) away by road. The driving time from Honningsvåg to Alta is 3:15 hours. The pass at Sennalandet is sometimes closed during snow storms in the winter time. If this happens, the alternative route takes over 6:00 hours, 440 km (273 mi), so the weather forecast should be checked 6–8 hours before. Another option is the Lakselv Banak Airport which is 165 km (103 mi) and 2:30 hours away by road and without a mountain pass, but has only weekly flights to Oslo.

| Airlines | Destinations |
|---|---|
| Widerøe | Hammerfest, Kirkenes, Mehamn, Tromsø, Vadsø |

== Statistics ==
Annual passenger traffic
| Year | Passengers | % Change |
|---|---|---|
| 2025 | 19,613 | ▲8.0% |
| 2024 | 18,166 | ▼ -25.8% |
| 2023 | 24,498 | ▲3.2% |
| 2022 | 23,728 | ▲15.0% |
| 2021 | 20,630 | ▲30.9% |
| 2020 | 15,758 | ▼ -39.8% |
| 2019 | 26,158 | ▲4.0% |
| 2018 | 25,146 | ▼ -0.9% |
| 2017 | 25,385 | ▼ -0.1% |
| 2016 | 25,410 | ▲7.8% |
| 2015 | 23,580 | |

== Accidents and incidents ==
On 29 October 1990 at 14:30 a Twin Otter of the Royal Norwegian Air Force crashed during landing at Honningsvåg Airport. The pilots lost control during turbulence and strong wind and the aircraft crashed 150 m (500 ft) from the runway threshold. Three of the fifteen people on board were killed. The accident resulted in stricter wind restrictions at the airport.
