= Valan, Nordkapp =

Valan
- Village
- Interactive map of Valan
- Location within Finnmark Location within Norway
- Coordinates: 71°00′32″N 25°58′40″E
- Country: Norway
- Region: Northern Norway
- County: Finnmark
- District: Vest-Finnmark
- Municipality: Nordkapp Municipality
- Elevation: 6 m (20 ft)
- Time zone: UTC+01:00 (CET)
  - Summer (DST): UTC+02:00 (CEST)
- Post Code: 9750 Honningsvåg

Valan is a small coastal village on the island of Magerøya in Nordkapp Municipality in Finnmark county in far northern Norway. Valan is the site of Honningsvåg Airport, the local airport for the town of Honningsvåg which is located about 2 kilometres (1.2 mi) south of Valan. The European route E69 highway runs through the village.
