= Nordvågen =

- Village
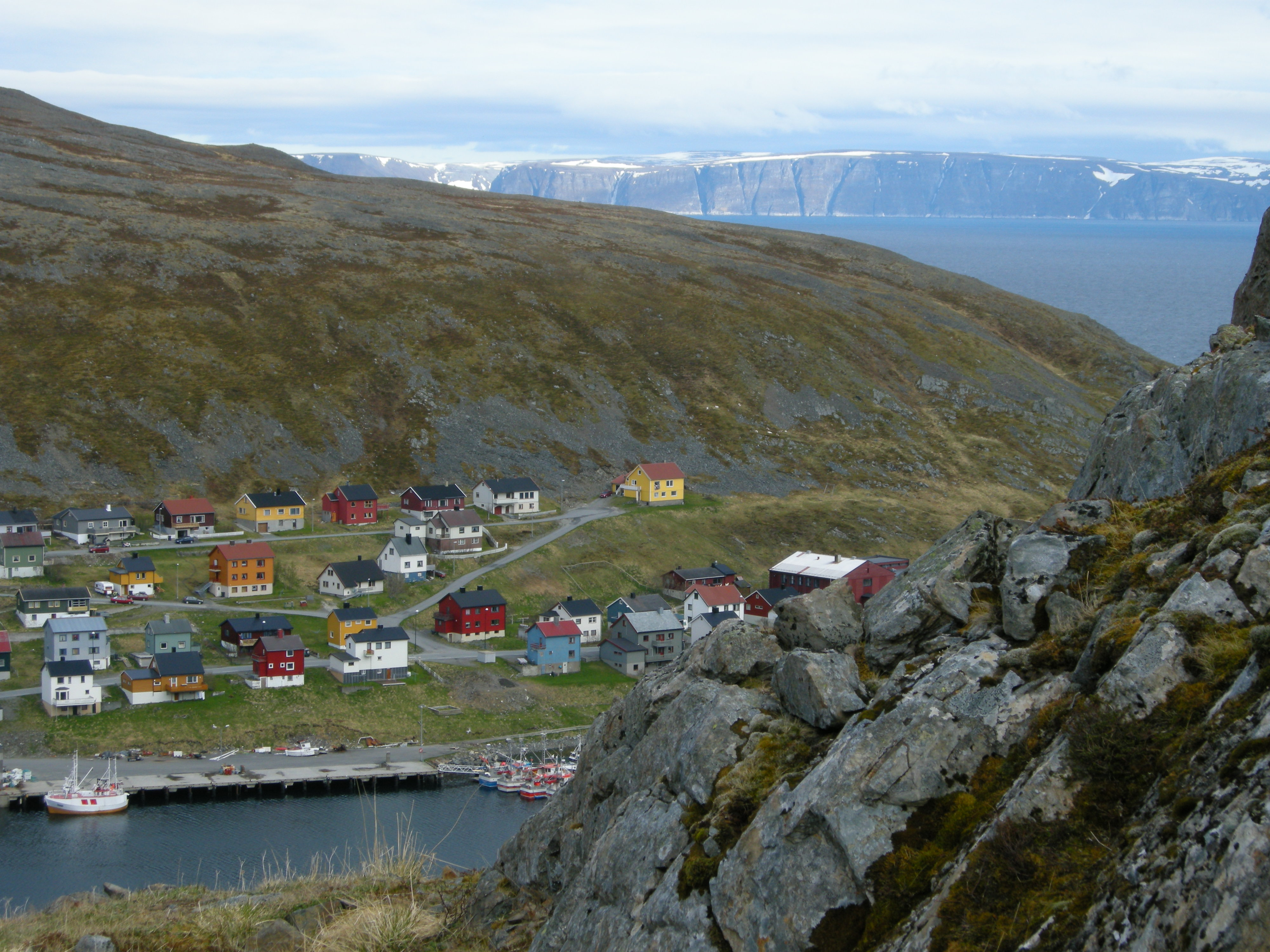
- View of the village
- Interactive map of Nordvågen
- Location within Finnmark Location within Norway
- Coordinates: 70°58′49″N 26°01′55″E
- Country: Norway
- Region: Northern Norway
- County: Finnmark
- District: Vest-Finnmark
- Municipality: Nordkapp Municipality

Area
  - Total: 0.20 km^{2} (0.077 sq mi)
- Elevation: 11 m (36 ft)

Population (2023)
  - Total: 392
  - Density: 1,960/km^{2} (5,100/sq mi)
- Time zone: UTC+01:00 (CET)
  - Summer (DST): UTC+02:00 (CEST)
- Post Code: 9760 Nordvågen

Nordvågen is a small fishing village in Nordkapp Municipality in Finnmark county, Norway. The village is located on the eastern coast of the island of Magerøya about 3 kilometres (1.9 mi) northeast of the town of Honningsvåg, along the Porsangerfjorden. The abandoned village of Kjelvik lies about 3 kilometres (1.9 mi) northeast of Nordvågen. The village has a fish processing plant. The 0.2-square-kilometre (49-acre) village has a population (2023) of 392 which gives the village a population density of 1,960 inhabitants per square kilometre (5,100/sq mi).
