= Alfred Vågnes =

Norwegian politician

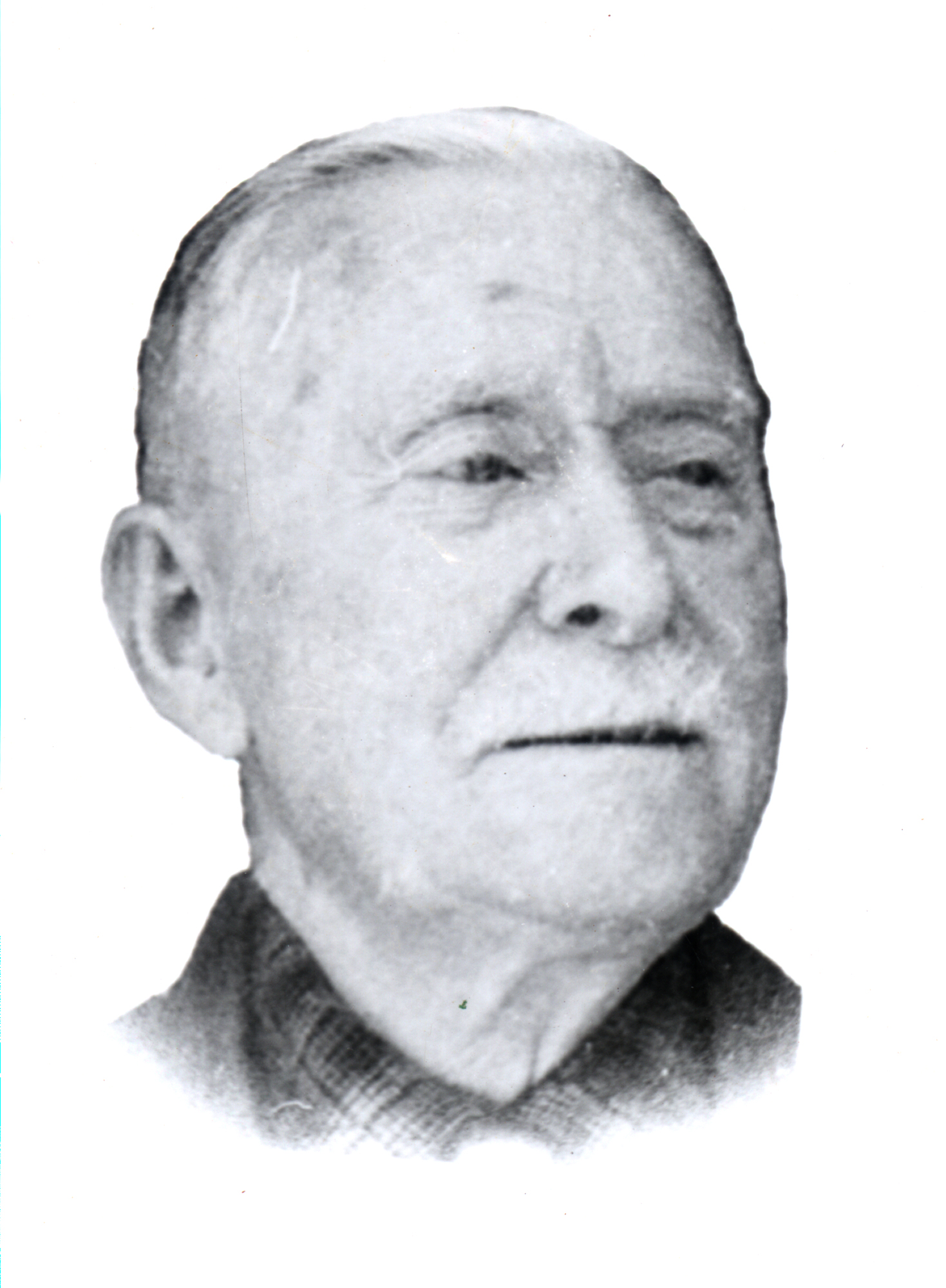

Member of Parliament for Finnmark
- In office 1945–1949

Mayor of Kjelvik Municipality
- In office 1931–1934

Personal details
- Born: April 13, 1880 Tromsøysund, Norway
- Died: October 12, 1970 (aged 90)
- Party: Communist Party of Norway (1924-)
- Other political affiliations: Labour Party (-1924)

Alfred Leonard Kristian Vågnes (13 April 1880–12 October 1970) was a Norwegian politician for the Labour Party and later the Communist Party.

He was born in Tromsøysund Municipality.

Originally active in the Labour Party, Vågnes served in the position of deputy representative to the Parliament during the term 1922–1924. He was a member of the national party board from 1920 to 1923, and represented the party at the Third Comintern Congress in 1921. In 1923 the Labour Party left Comintern, and in 1924 Vågnes joined the Communist Party.

He was elected to the Norwegian Parliament from Finnmark in 1945, but was not re-elected in 1949 as the Communist Party dropped from 11 to 0 seats in Parliament.

Vågnes held various positions in municipal council of Kjelvik Municipality from 1916 to 1940, serving as deputy mayor briefly in 1931 and mayor there in 1931–1934.
