= Kamøyvær =

- Village
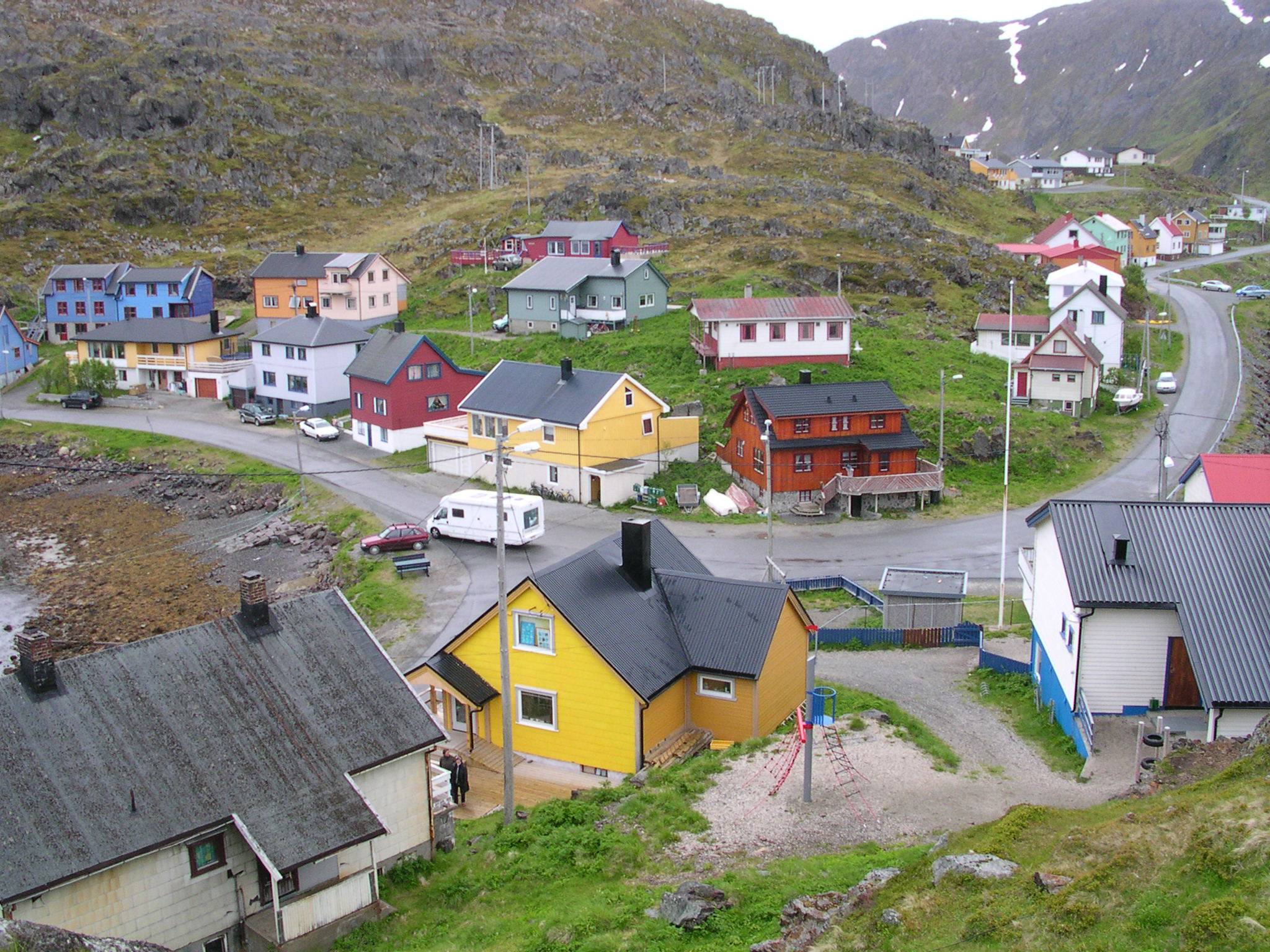
- Centre of village, taken from near the Kamøyfjord light. On the right, the Fv172 road comes from the south and proceeds through the centre before heading south again on the left of the picture. The two blue-painted houses on the left hand side of the picture are part of the group of houses which make up the Arran guesthouse. The top floor of the yellow house in the bottom centre of the picture contains the Gallery East of the Sun.
- Interactive map of Kamøyvær
- Location within Finnmark Location within Norway
- Coordinates: 71.0487°N 25.9055°E
- Country: Norway
- Region: Northern Norway
- County: Finnmark
- District: Vest-Finnmark
- Municipality: Nordkapp Municipality
- Elevation: 4 m (13 ft)
- Time zone: UTC+01:00 (CET)
  - Summer (DST): UTC+02:00 (CEST)
- Post Code: 9750 Honningsvåg

Kamøyvær is a fishing village in Nordkapp Municipality in Finnmark county, Norway. The village lies along the Kamøyfjorden on the east side of the island of Magerøya, about 10 kilometres (6.2 mi) northwest of the town of Honningsvåg. It sits at the end of a cul-de-sac road, the Norwegian County Road 172. About 2 kilometres (1.2 mi) south of the village, the road meets the European route E69, the main road leading to the North Cape.

The village is sheltered from the open sea by the islands of Lille Kamøya and Store Kamøya, the water between the village and the latter being called the Østersundet.

There are around 70 inhabitants in the village. Although there are no ethnic distinctions today, the people of the village are descended from coastal Sami and Kven as well as Norwegians. In the summer of 2012, the labour force in the village included people from the Baltic states.

A small hotel/guesthouse called the Arran, owned by a Sami family, occupies three blue-painted buildings in the centre of the village. One of them is right on the waters of the harbour and the other two are just across the road. The top floor of a house in the centre of the village contains an art gallery called the Gallery East of the Sun which displays and sells the work of a German-born artist, Eva Schmutterer, who lives in the village.

== Hjalmarneset peninsula ==
There is a small lighthouse, the Kamøyfjord light, on the hill on the Hjalmarneset peninsula at the north side of the village. There is also a small cemetery on the western side of this peninsula.

== Kuvika ==
At Kuvika, a hamlet at the southern entrance to the village, there is a small fish processing plant on the side of the Risfjorden; this is supplied by the boats that use the harbour in the middle of the village.

== Media gallery ==
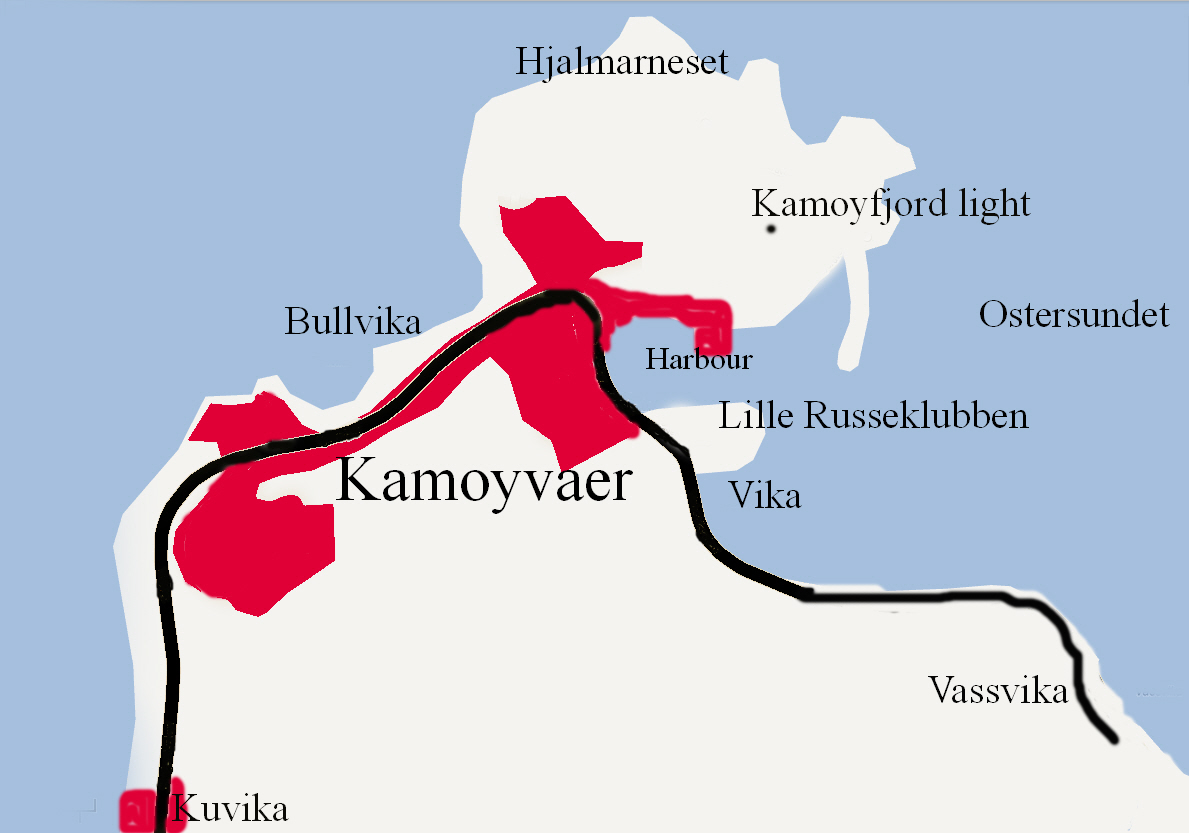
Map of village, showing the Fv172 access road and location of harbour

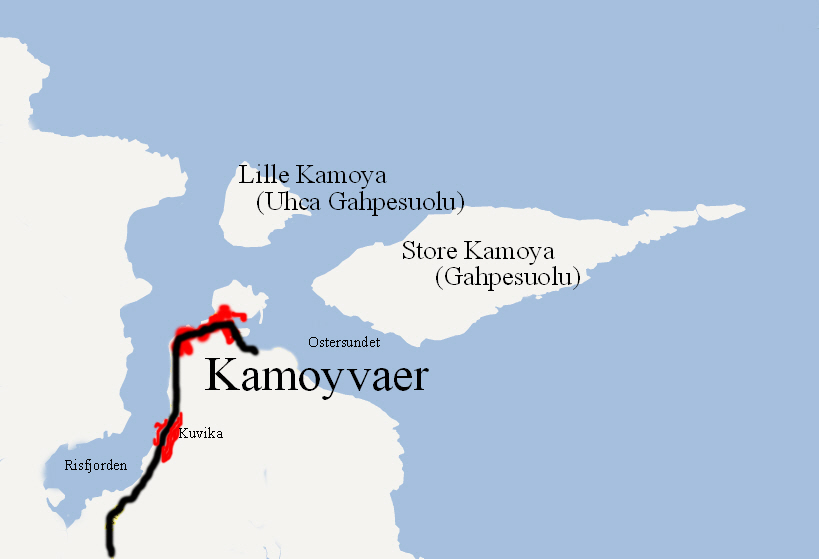
Location of village, showing how its position is sheltered by two islands

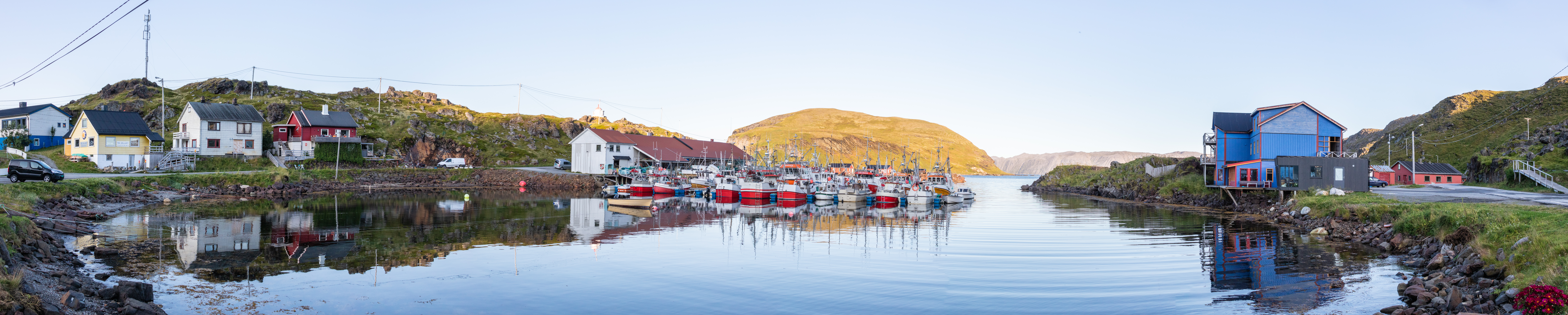
Centre of the village, taken from the Fv172 road on the south side of the harbour, with the waters of harbour on the right-hand side. The Kamøyfjord light can be seen on the top of the hill in the centre of the picture.

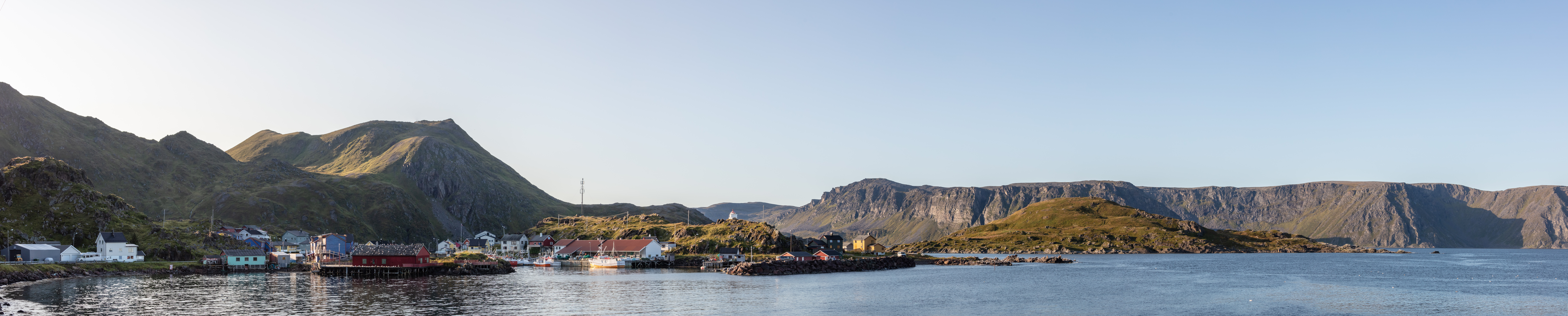
Harbour, taken from the Fv172 road on the south side.

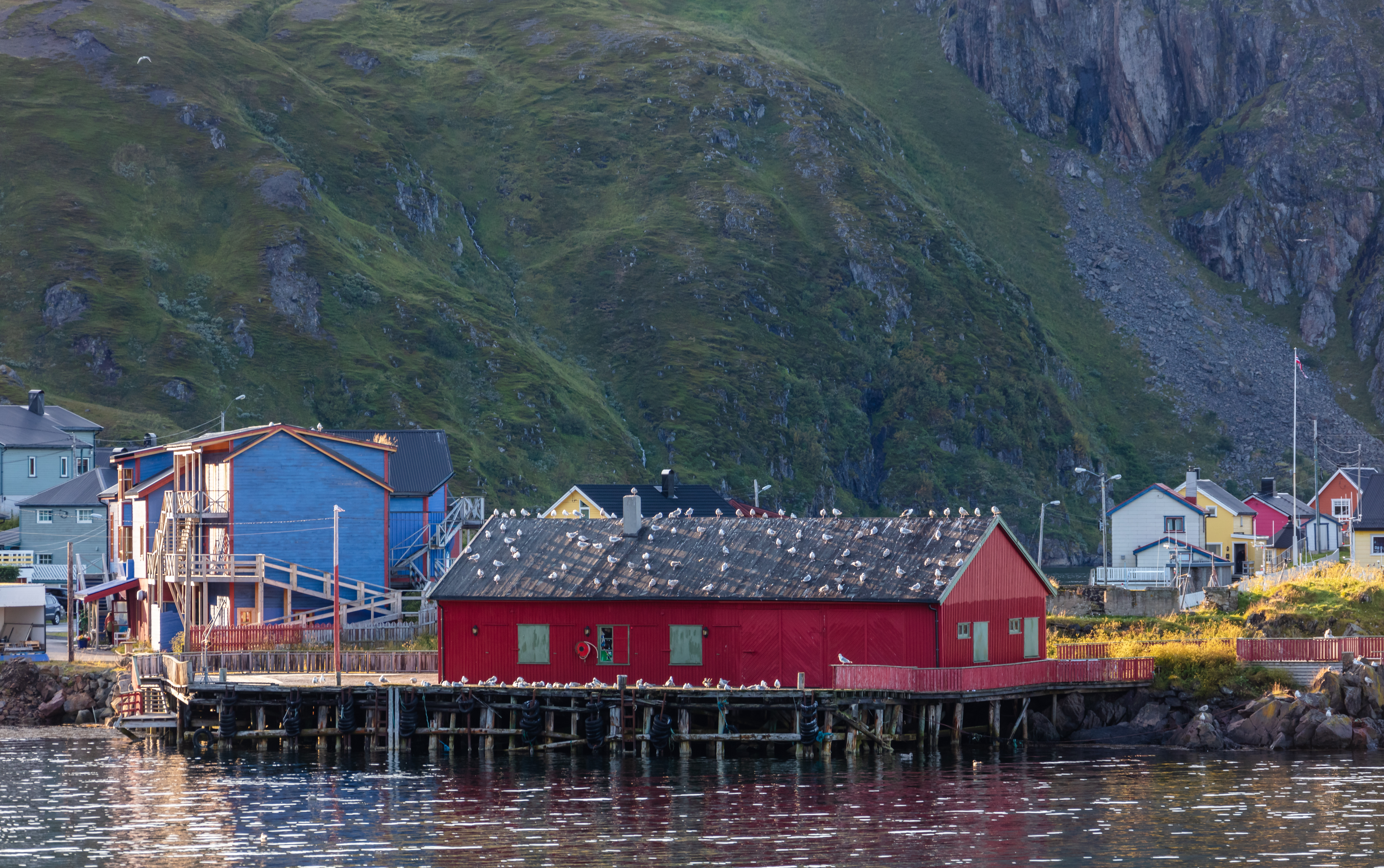
Detail of a wooden house in the harbour.

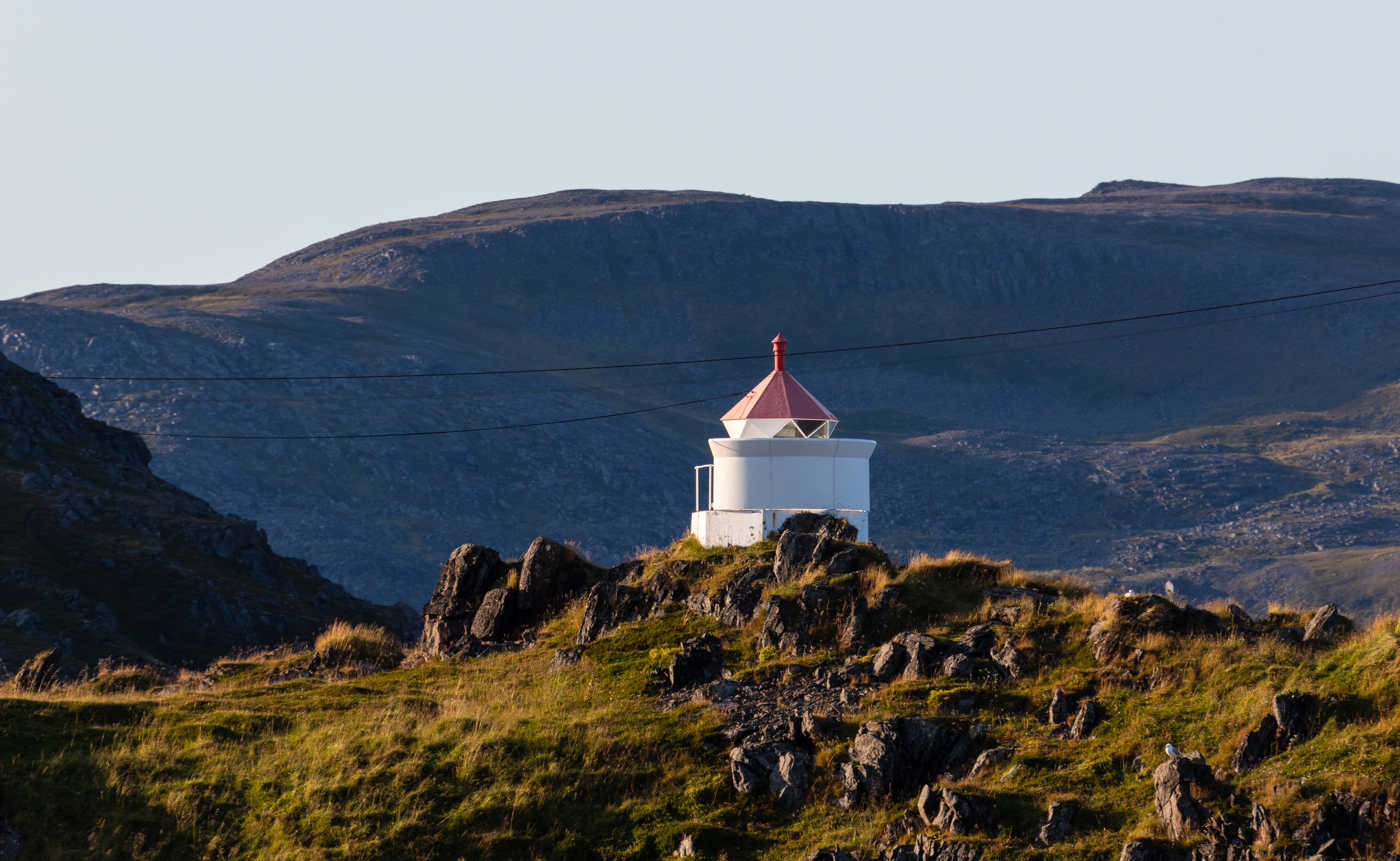
Kamøyvær lighthouse.
