= Magerøya =

Island in Finnmark, Norway

Magerøya (Norwegian); Máhkarávju (Northern Sami)
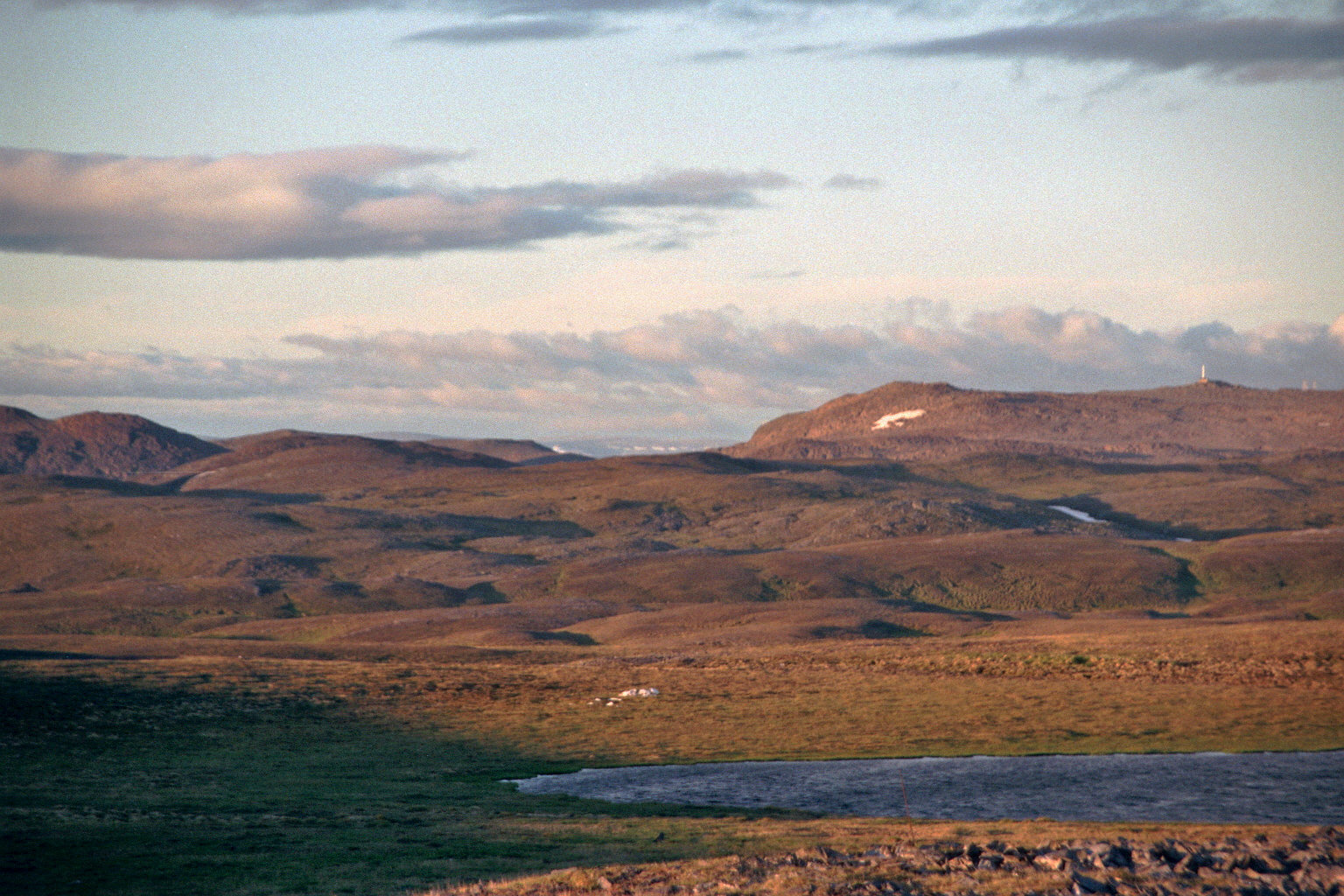

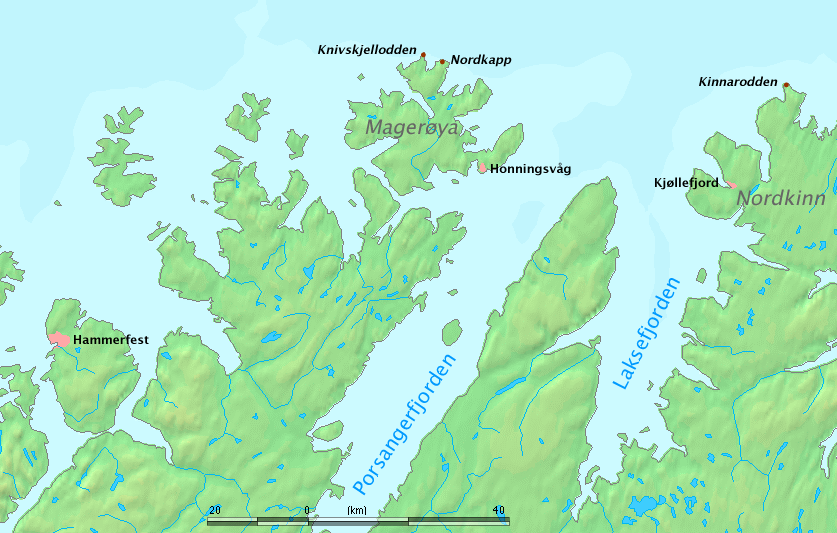

- Location of the island Magerøya (Norway)

Geography
- Location: Finnmark, Norway
- Coordinates: 71.0335°N 25.8265°E
- Area: 436.4 km^{2} (168.5 sq mi)
- Length: 30 km (19 mi)
- Width: 35 km (21.7 mi)
- Highest elevation: 417 m (1368 ft)
- Highest point: Gråkallfjellet

Administration
- Norway
- County: Finnmark
- Municipality: Nordkapp Municipality

Demographics
- Population: 3201 (2012)

Magerøya (Norwegian) or Máhkarávju (Northern Sami) is a large island in Finnmark county, in the extreme northern part of Norway. The island lies along the Barents Sea in Nordkapp Municipality, just north of the Porsanger Peninsula. The mouth of Porsangerfjorden lies off the east coast of the island.

Magerøya has an area of 436.6 square kilometres (168.6 sq mi) and the highest elevation on the island is the 417-metre (1,368 ft) mountain Gråkallfjellet. The most northern point on the island is also the northernmost point in Norway outside of Svalbard and Bjørnøya: Knivskjellodden. The island features a bleak, barren, tundra-covered landscape devoid of any trees (except for a few small pockets of mountain birch), with steep cliffs along the coast, and dramatic mountainscapes in the interior. On southern Magerøya, archaeologists have found evidence of settlements dating back 10,000 years.

Due to its location inside the Arctic Circle, the Sun does not set from mid-May to late July and does not rise from mid-November to late January.

== Places on Magerøya ==
The main population centre on the island is the town of Honningsvåg. Other smaller settlements include the fishing villages of Gjesvær, Skarsvåg, Nordvågen, and Kamøyvær. North Cape is a very popular tourist attraction on the northern shore of the island.

== Transportation ==
Magerøya's main claim to fame is the North Cape, a steep cliff cape on the northern coast that is a major tourist attraction. To accommodate the large numbers of tourists that visit the island, a subsea tunnel was built from 1993 to 1999. The North Cape Tunnel is part of the European route E69 highway. It is 6.87 kilometres (4 mi 473 yd) long and reaches a depth of 212 metres (696 ft) below sea level. For a time, it was one of the longest and deepest subsea tunnels in the world. Fog or ice may occur inside the tunnel, even in summer.

Norway's Hurtigruten ferry service stops at the town of Honningsvåg on Magerøya since the waters around the island remain ice-free all year round due to the warm North Atlantic drift. Honningsvåg Airport is located on the eastern part of the island.

== Media gallery ==
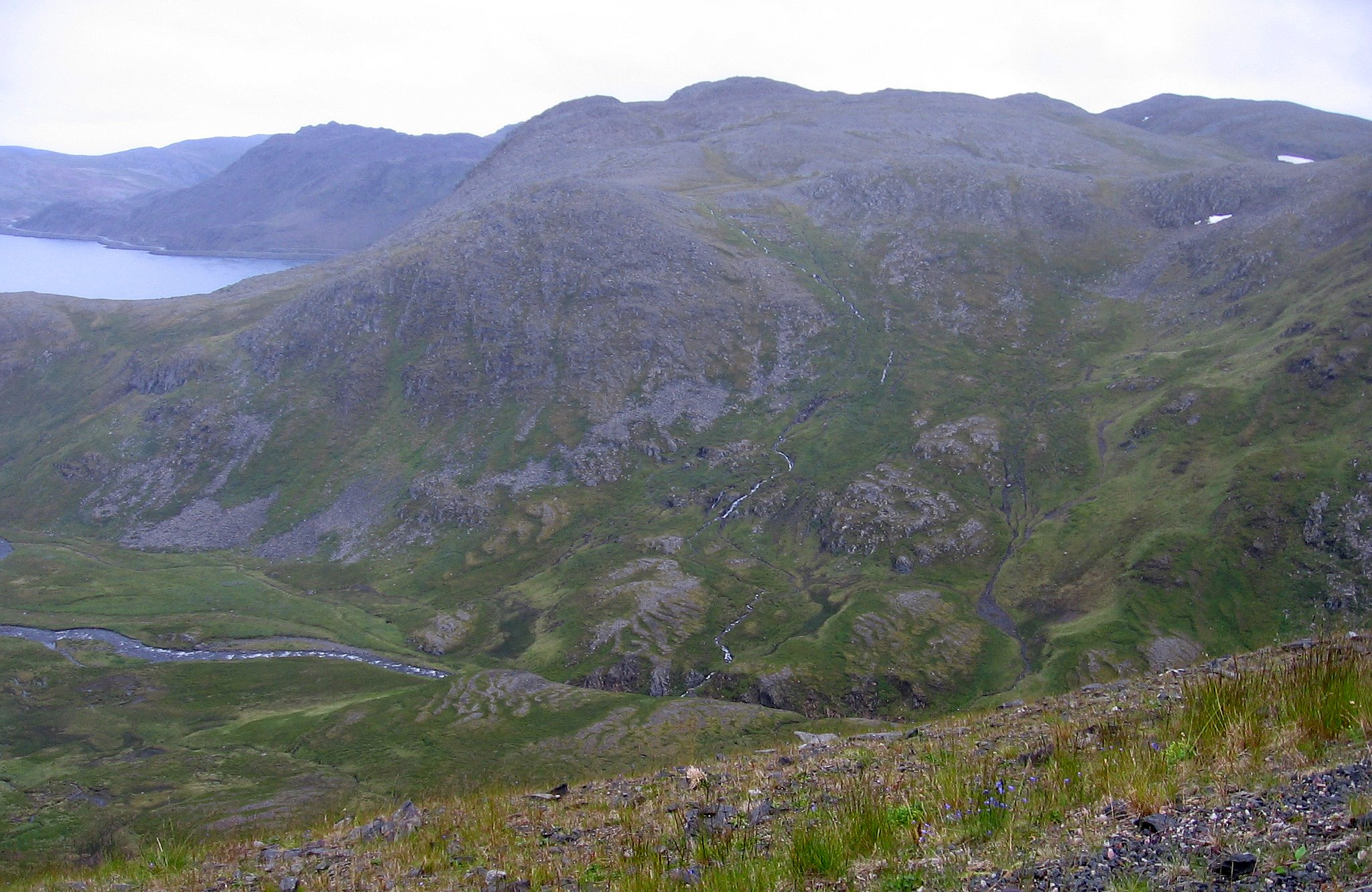
View from E69

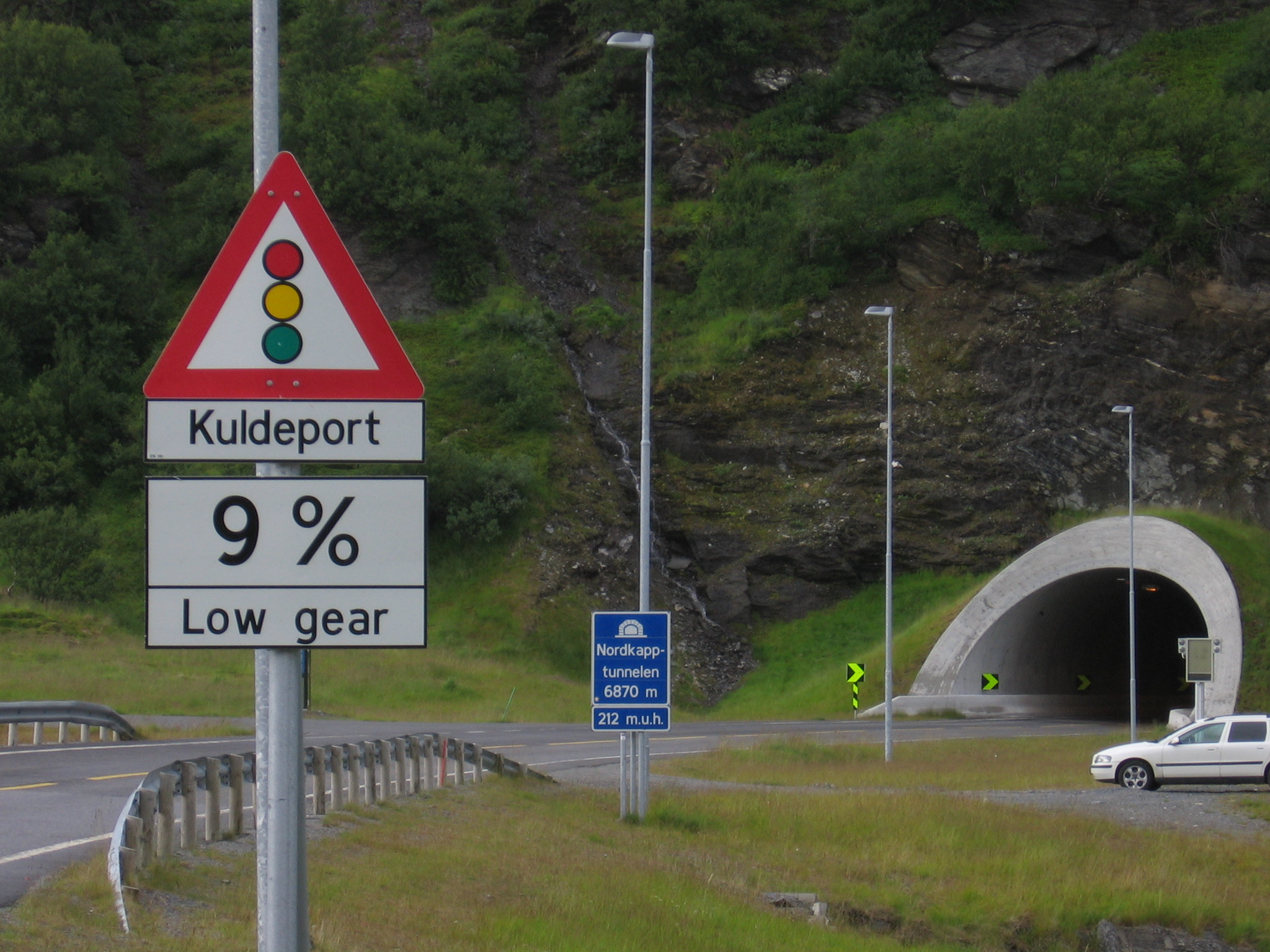
North Cape Tunnel entrance

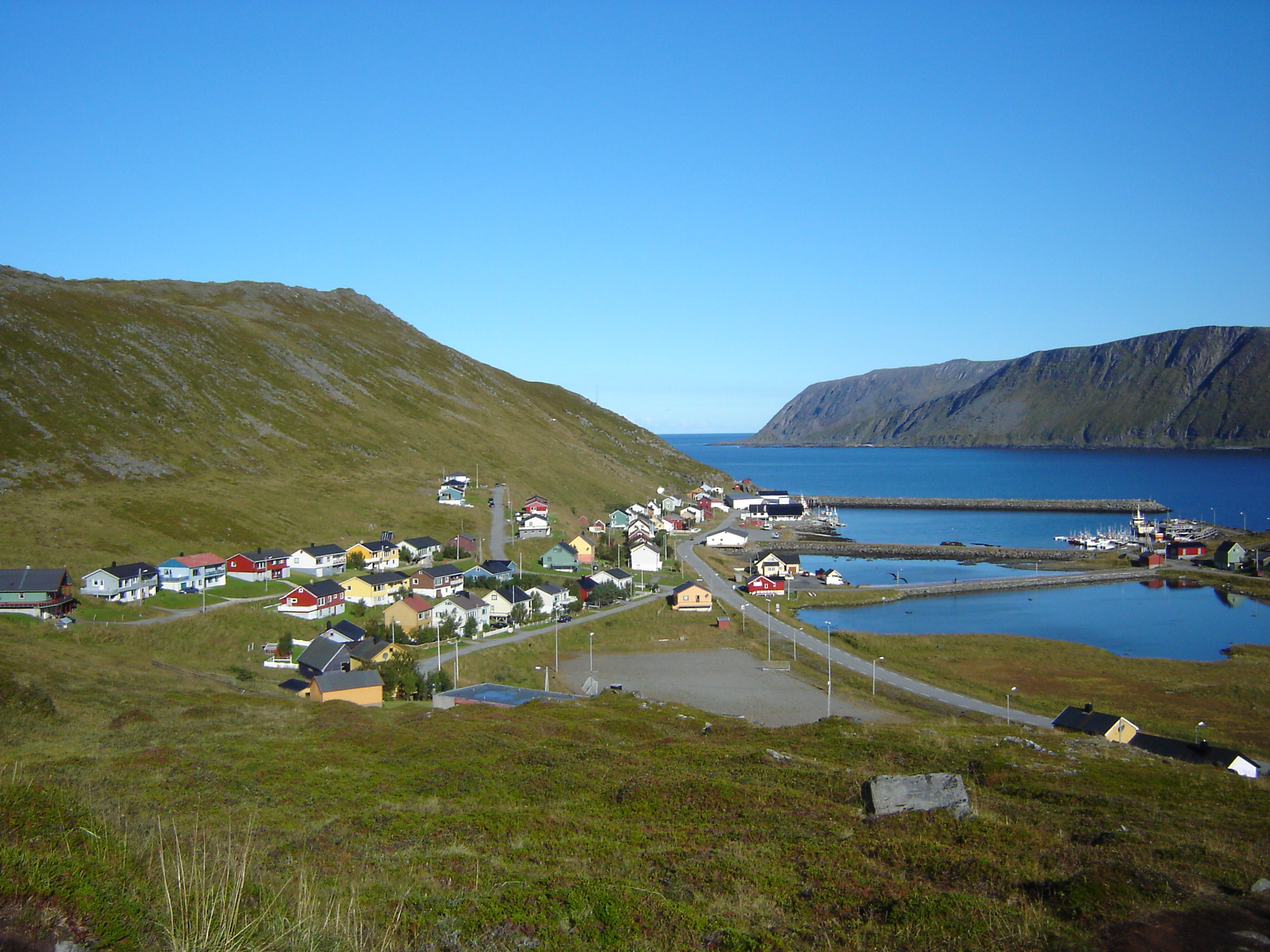
Skarsvåg village with some of the world's northernmost trees

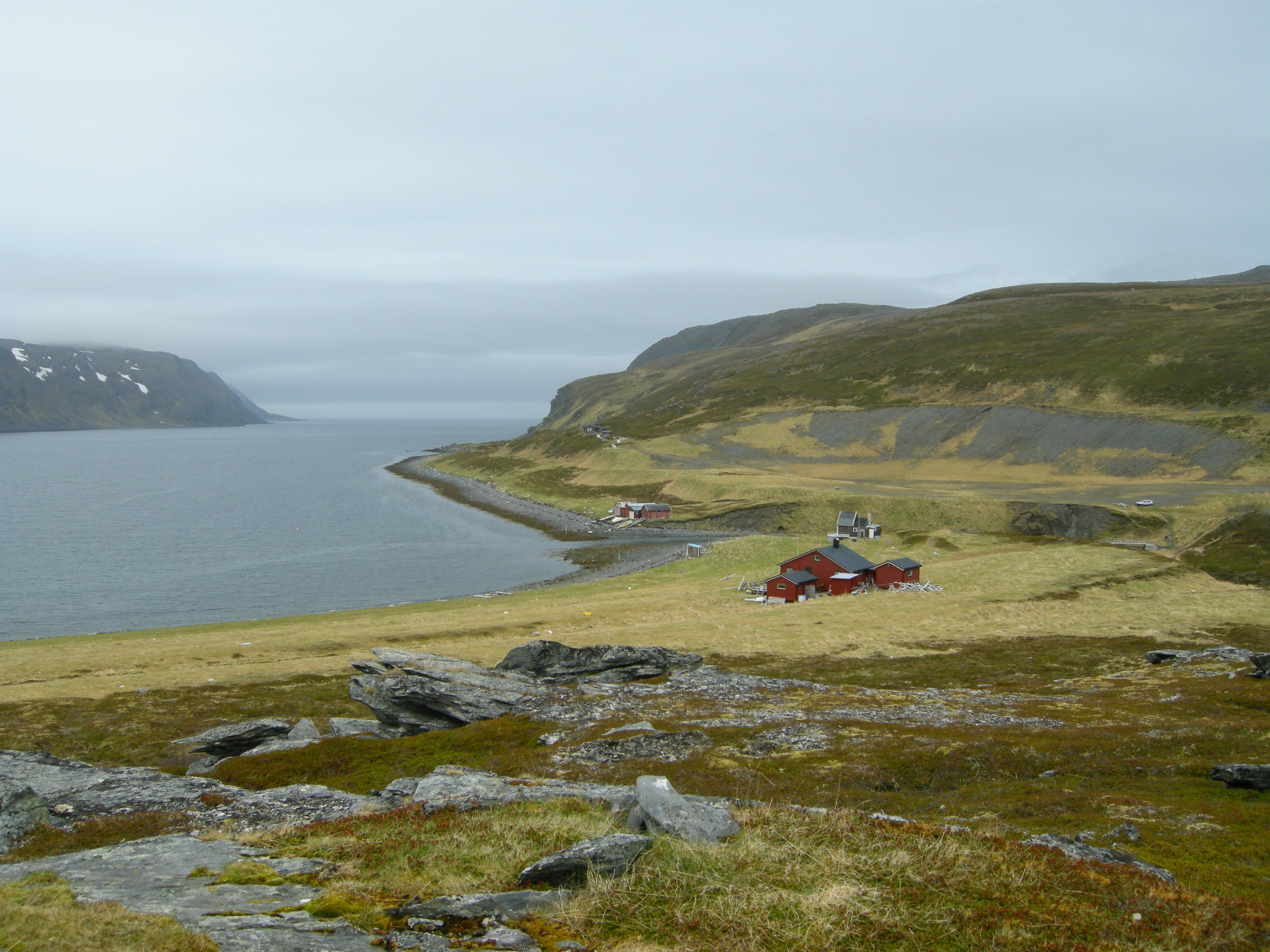
Tiny village of Tufjorden

== See also ==
- List of islands of Norway
