= Kåfjord =

Kåfjord or Kåfjorden (Northern Sami: Gáivuotna) may refer to these places in Norway:

== Agder county ==
- Kåfjord, Agder (or Kvåfjord), a village in Lindesnes Municipality
- Kåfjorden (Agder) (or Kvåfjorden), a fjord in Lindesnes Municipality

== Finnmark county ==
- Kåfjord, Alta, a village in Alta municipality
- Kåfjorden (Alta), a fjord in Alta municipality
- Kåfjord Church (Finnmark), a church in Alta municipality
- Kåfjord, Nordkapp, a village in Nordkapp municipality
- Kåfjorden (Nordkapp), a fjord in Nordkapp municipality

== Troms county ==
- Kåfjord Municipality, a municipality in Troms county
- Kåfjorden (Troms), a fjord in Kåfjord municipality
- Kåfjord Church, a church in Kåfjord municipality
