= Honningsvåg (disambiguation) =

Honningsvåg (or historically, Honningsvaag) may refer to:

== Places ==
- Honningsvåg, a town in Nordkapp municipality in Finnmark county, Norway
- Honningsvåg Church, a church in the town of Honningsvåg in Finnmark county, Norway
- Honningsvåg Airport, an airport serving the town of Honningsvåg in Finnmark county, Norway
- Honningsvåg Tunnel, a tunnel in Nordkapp municipality in Finnmark county, Norway

== Other ==
- HNoMS Honningsvåg, a naval trawler that served throughout the Second World War as a patrol boat in the Royal Norwegian Navy
