= Skarsvåg =

- Village
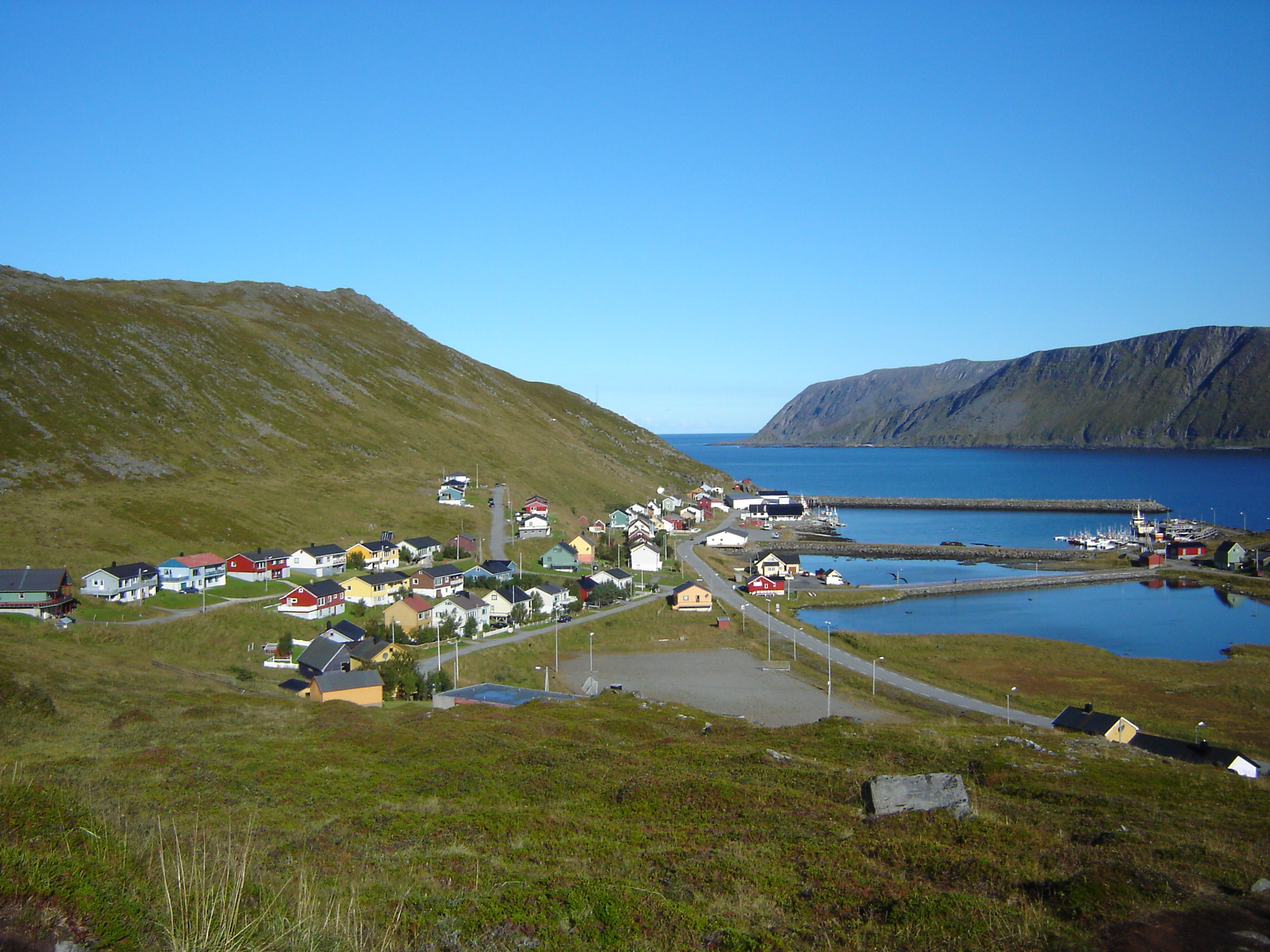
- View of the village
- Interactive map of Skarsvåg
- Location within Finnmark Location within Norway
- Coordinates: 71°06′47″N 25°49′37″E
- Country: Norway
- Region: Northern Norway
- County: Finnmark
- District: Vest-Finnmark
- Municipality: Nordkapp Municipality
- Elevation: 2 m (6.6 ft)

Population
  - Total: 141
- Time zone: UTC+01:00 (CET)
  - Summer (DST): UTC+02:00 (CEST)
- Post Code: 9763 Skarsvåg

Skarsvåg is a village in Nordkapp Municipality in Finnmark county, Norway. The village lies along the northern coast of the island of Magerøya, and it claims the distinction of being the world's northernmost fishing village. The local fishing fleet primarily fishes for cod in the waters north of Magerøya. There are about 60 residents in Skarsvåg and it is located about 14 kilometres (8.7 mi) from the famous North Cape. Skarsvåg Church is located in the village.

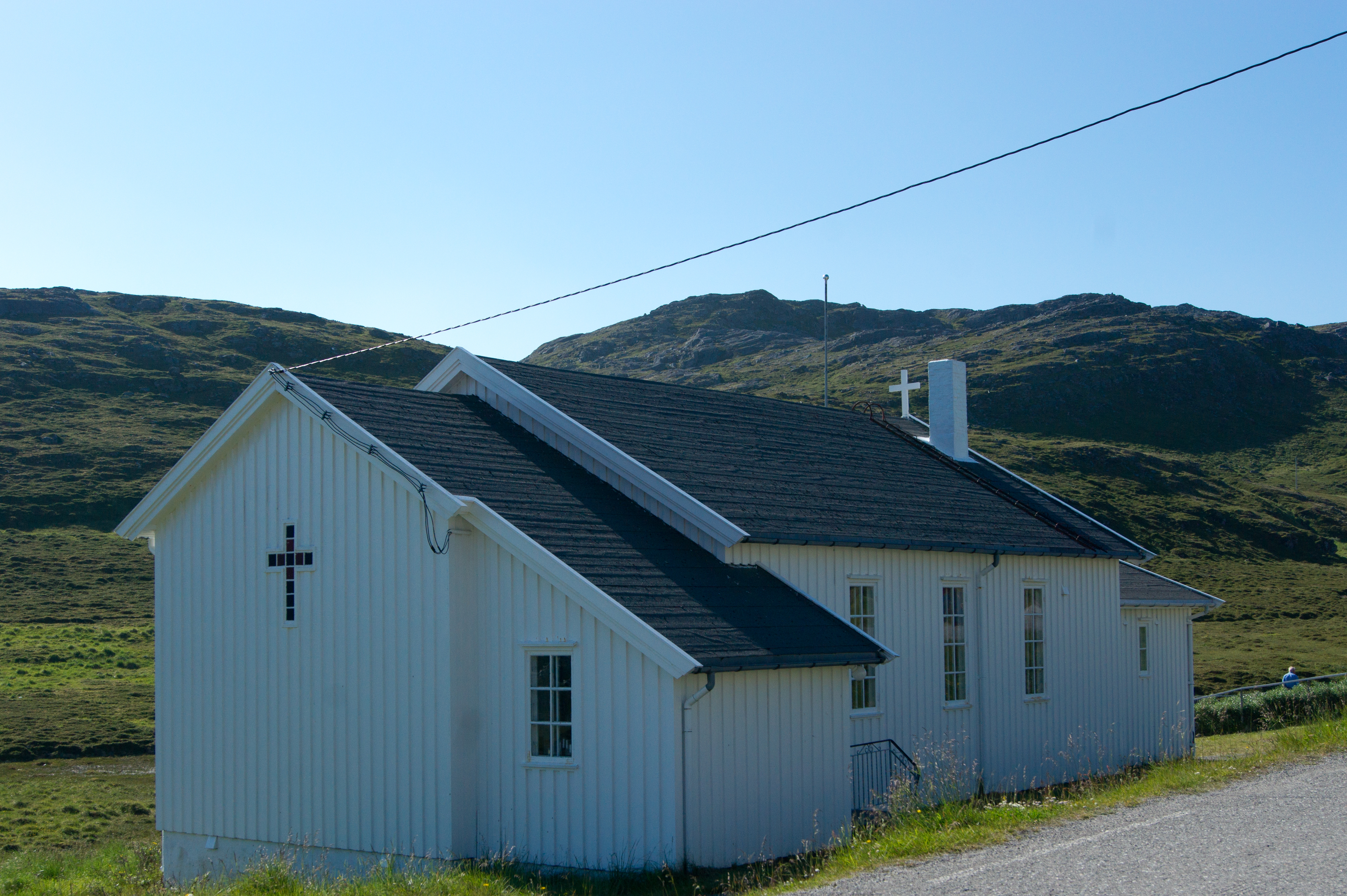
Skarsvåg Church

The village is apparently the northernmost settlement in the world that is accessible via a major road network, the European route E69.
