= Kåfjorden (Nordkapp) =

Fjord in Nordkapp, Norway

Kåfjorden (Norwegian)
- Gávkevuotna (Northern Sami)
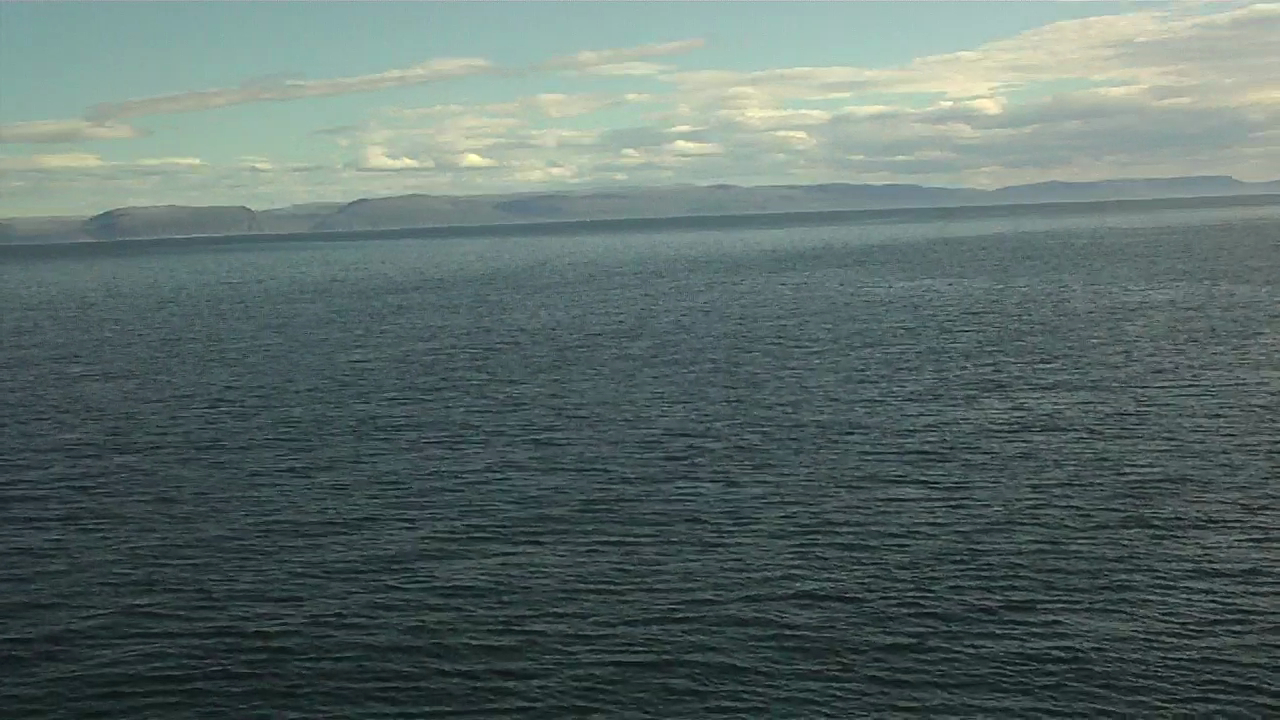
- View of the fjord
- Interactive map of the fjord
- Location: Finnmark county, Norway
- Coordinates: 70.8816°N 25.7409°E
- Type: Fjord
- Primary inflows: River Kåfjordelva
- Primary outflows: Magerøysundet strait
- Basin countries: Norway
- Max. length: 4.5 kilometres (2.8 mi)
- Max. width: 2.5 kilometres (1.6 mi)
- Max. depth: 55 metres (180 ft)

Kåfjorden (Northern Sami: Gávkevuotna) is a fjord in Nordkapp Municipality in Finnmark county, Norway. The 4.5-kilometre (2.8 mi) long fjord is located on the Porsanger Peninsula and it flows past the village of Kåfjord. It is located about 12 kilometres (7.5 mi) southeast of the town of Honningsvåg. The fjord flows out into the Magerøysundet strait and then into the Porsangerfjorden. The European route E69 highway follows the southern coast of the fjord, and the entrance to the North Cape Tunnel lies on the western coast of the fjord.

== See also ==
- List of Norwegian fjords
