= Olderdalen =

Village in Kåfjord, Norway

Olderdalen (Norwegian); Dálusvággi (Northern Sami); Talosvankka (Kven)
- Village
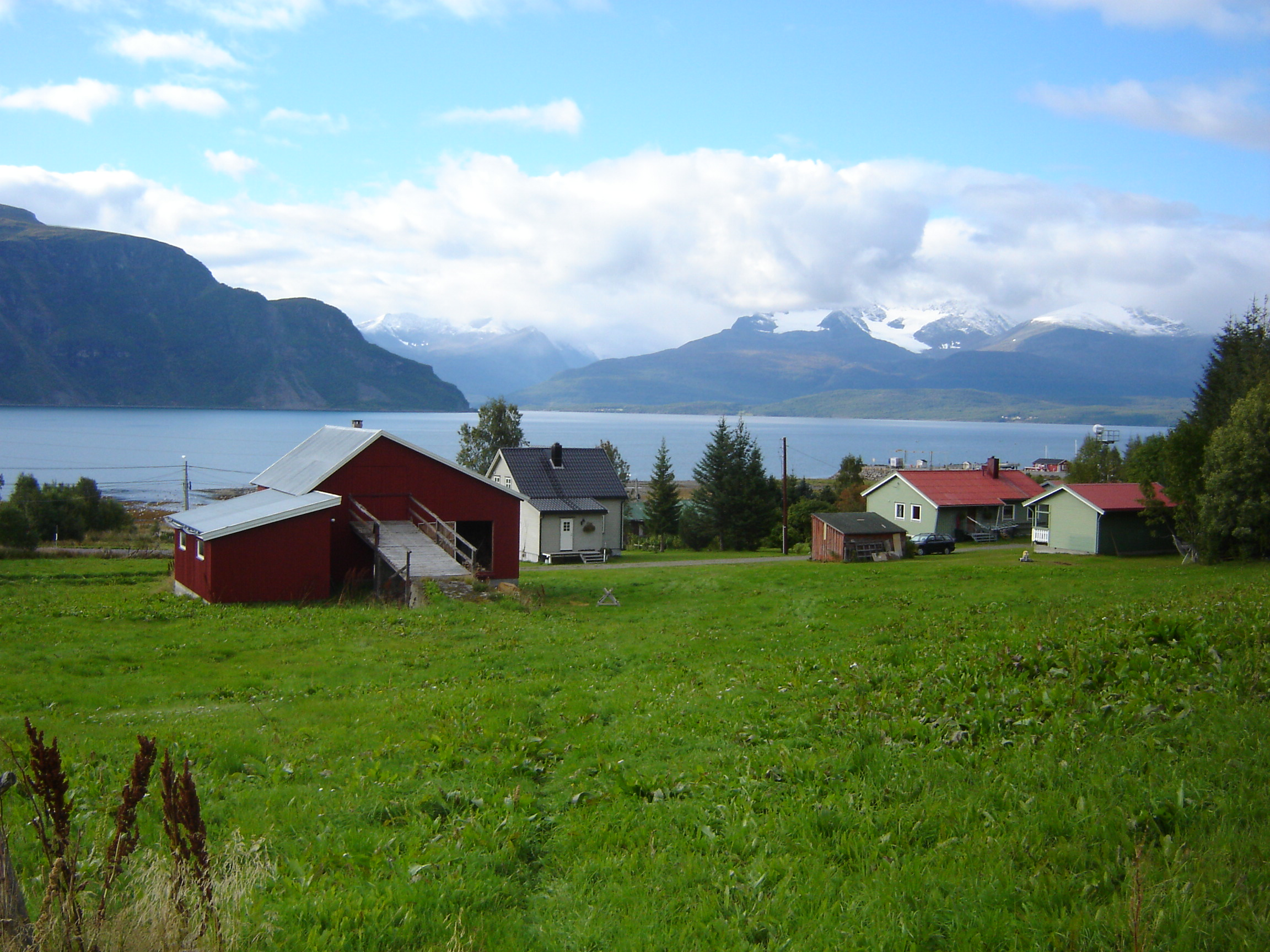
- View of the village
- Interactive map of the village
- Coordinates: 69.60298°N 20.53705°E
- Country: Norway
- Region: Northern Norway
- County: Troms
- District: Nord-Troms
- Municipality: Kåfjord Municipality

Area
  - Total: 0.47 km^{2} (0.18 sq mi)
- Elevation: 4 m (13 ft)

Population (2023)
  - Total: 286
  - Density: 609/km^{2} (1,580/sq mi)
- Time zone: UTC+01:00 (CET)
  - Summer (DST): UTC+02:00 (CEST)
- Post Code: 9146 Olderdalen

Olderdalen (Norwegian), Dálusvággi or Dálvvesvággi (Northern Sami), or Talosvankka (Kven) is the administrative centre of Kåfjord Municipality (also known as Gáivuotna Municipality and Kaivuono Municipality) in Troms county, Norway. Olderdalen is located in the Olderdalen valley along the Kåfjorden with a view of the Lyngen Alps. The village has a ferry connection to Lyngseidet, the administrative centre of Lyngen Municipality, across the fjord. The European route E6 highway passes through this village also.

Olderdalen is located about 16.7 km (10.4 mi) to the northwest of the village of Birtavarre and it is about 70 km (43 mi) to the east of the city of Tromsø. Kåfjord Church is located in this village. The 0.47-square-kilometre (120-acre) village has a population (2023) of 286 and a population density of 609 inhabitants per square kilometre (1,580/sq mi).

== Economy ==
The Olderdalen area is home to mainly farming and fishing. Raising sheep and dairy cattle are two of the most prominent types of agriculture in the area. There is also grocery services as well as public and private services.

== History ==
During World War II many of the houses and farms in Olderdalen fell victim of the German scorched earth tactics when they withdrew from Finland and Finnmark. This led to much of the infrastructure and buildings in the village being destroyed to prevent the invading Soviet forces from obtaining supplies.
