= Skarsvåg Church =

- Skarsvåg kirke
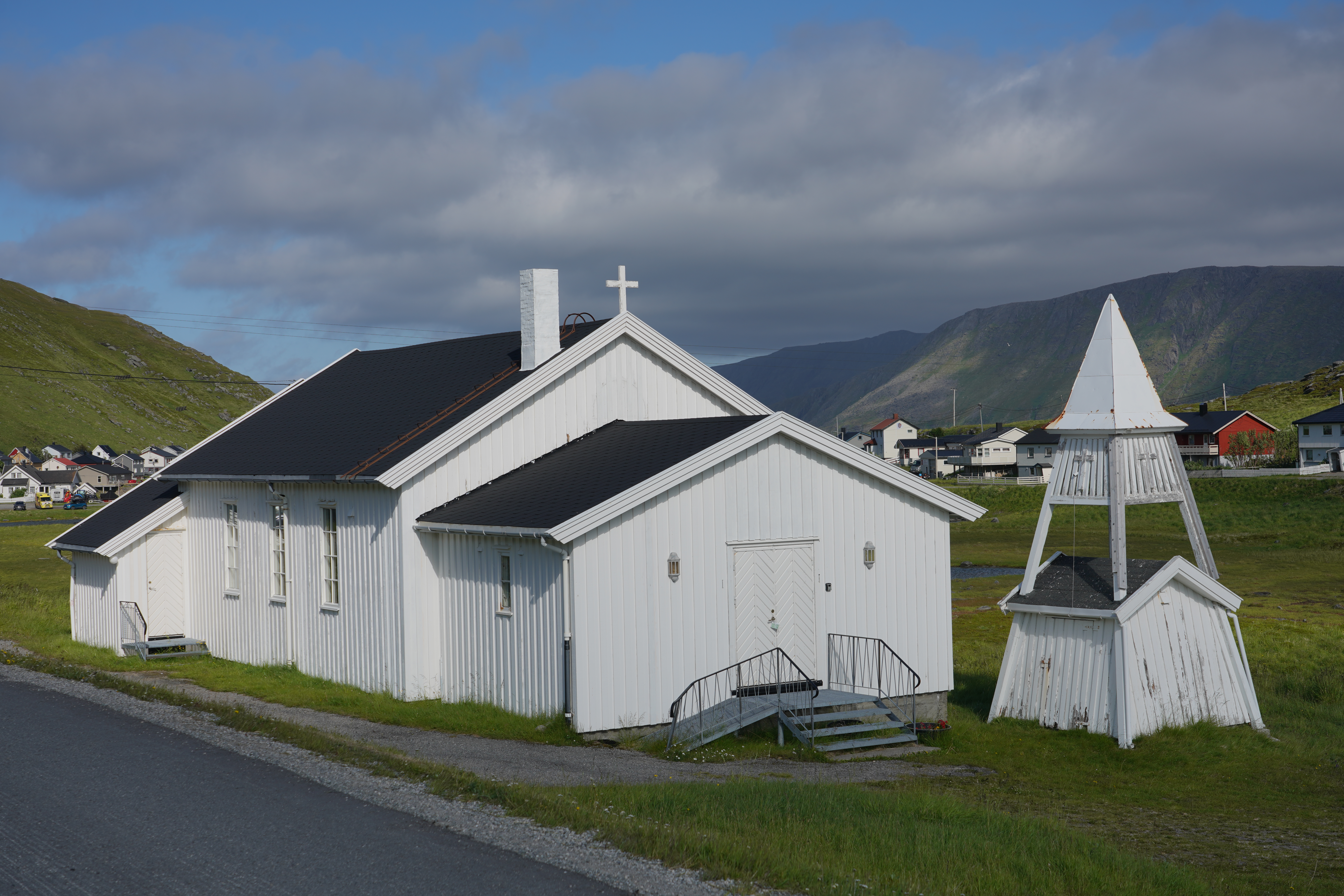
- View of the church
- Skarsvåg Church
- 71.109900°N 25.817695°E
- Location: Nordkapp Municipality, Finnmark
- Country: Norway
- Denomination: Church of Norway
- Churchmanship: Evangelical Lutheran

History
- Former name: Skarsvåg kapell
- Status: Chapel
- Founded: 1961
- Consecrated: 6 Aug 1961

Architecture
- Functional status: Active
- Architect: Rolf Harlew Jenssen
- Architectural type: Long church
- Completed: 1961 (65 years ago)

Specifications
- Capacity: 60
- Materials: Wood

Administration
- Diocese: Nord-Hålogaland
- Deanery: Hammerfest prosti
- Parish: Nordkapp
- Norwegian Cultural Heritage Site
- Type: Church
- Status: Not protected
- ID: 85445

Skarsvåg Church (Norwegian: Skarsvåg kirke) is a chapel of the Church of Norway in Nordkapp Municipality in Finnmark county, Norway. It is located in the village of Skarsvåg on the northern end of the island of Magerøya. It is an annex chapel for the Nordkapp parish which is part of the Hammerfest prosti (deanery) in the Diocese of Nord-Hålogaland. The white, wooden church was built in a long church style in 1961 using plans drawn up by the architect Rolf Harlew Jenssen. The church seats about 60 people.

== History ==
The first mention of the church in existing historical records was in 1589, but that was not the year the church was built. That medieval church was located near the mouth of the fjord at Lille Skarsvåg, about 3.5 kilometres (2.2 mi) northeast of the present site of the church. In 1748, the church was torn down. Many years later, a new Skarsvåg Chapel was built in the village of Skarsvåg, at the innermost part of the fjord, about 3.5 kilometres (2.2 mi) southwest of the medieval church site. The new chapel was consecrated on 6 August 1961 by the Bishop Alf Wiig. The building was called Skarsvåg Chapel until 1999 when it was renamed as a "church".

== Media gallery ==
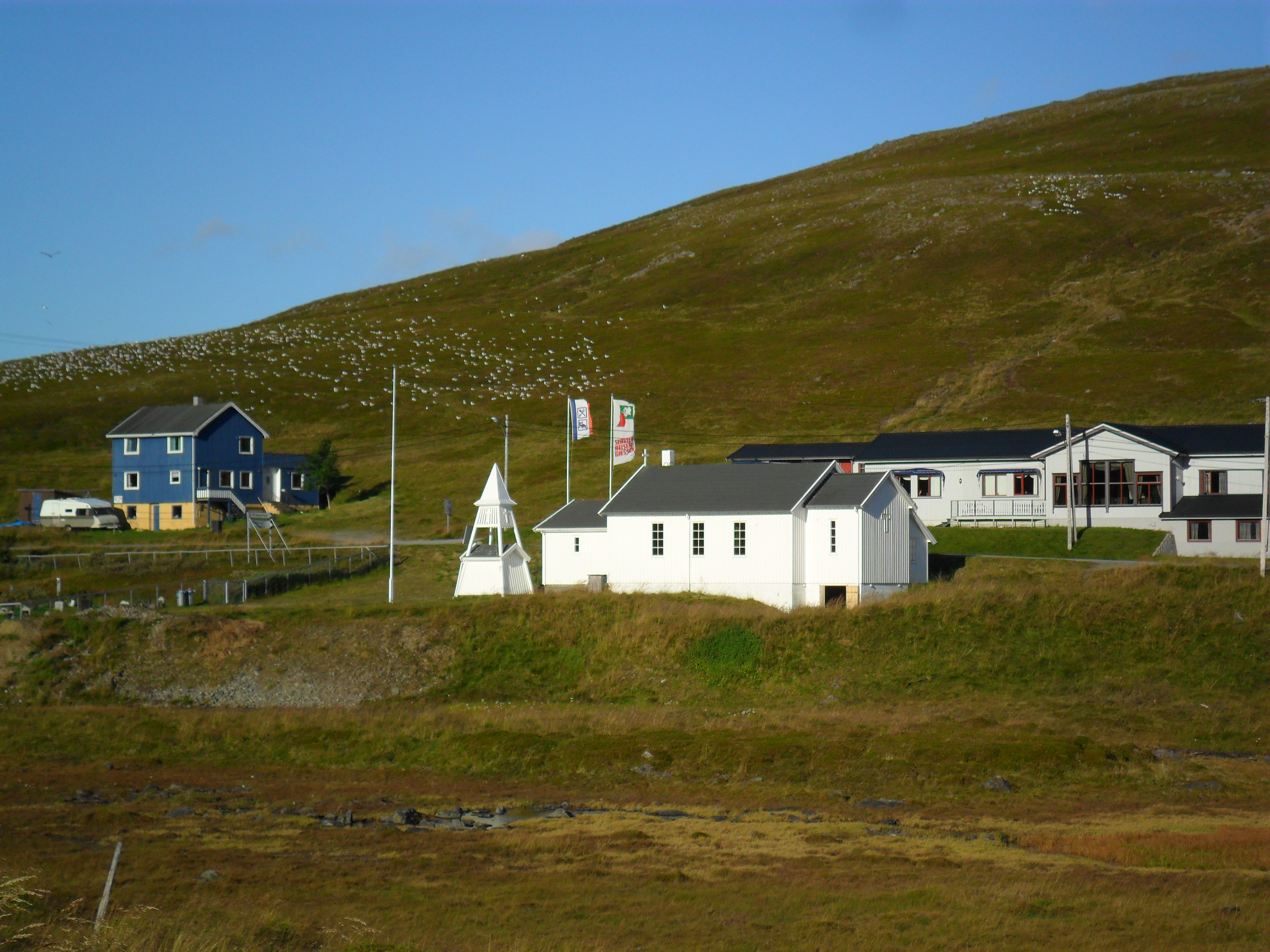

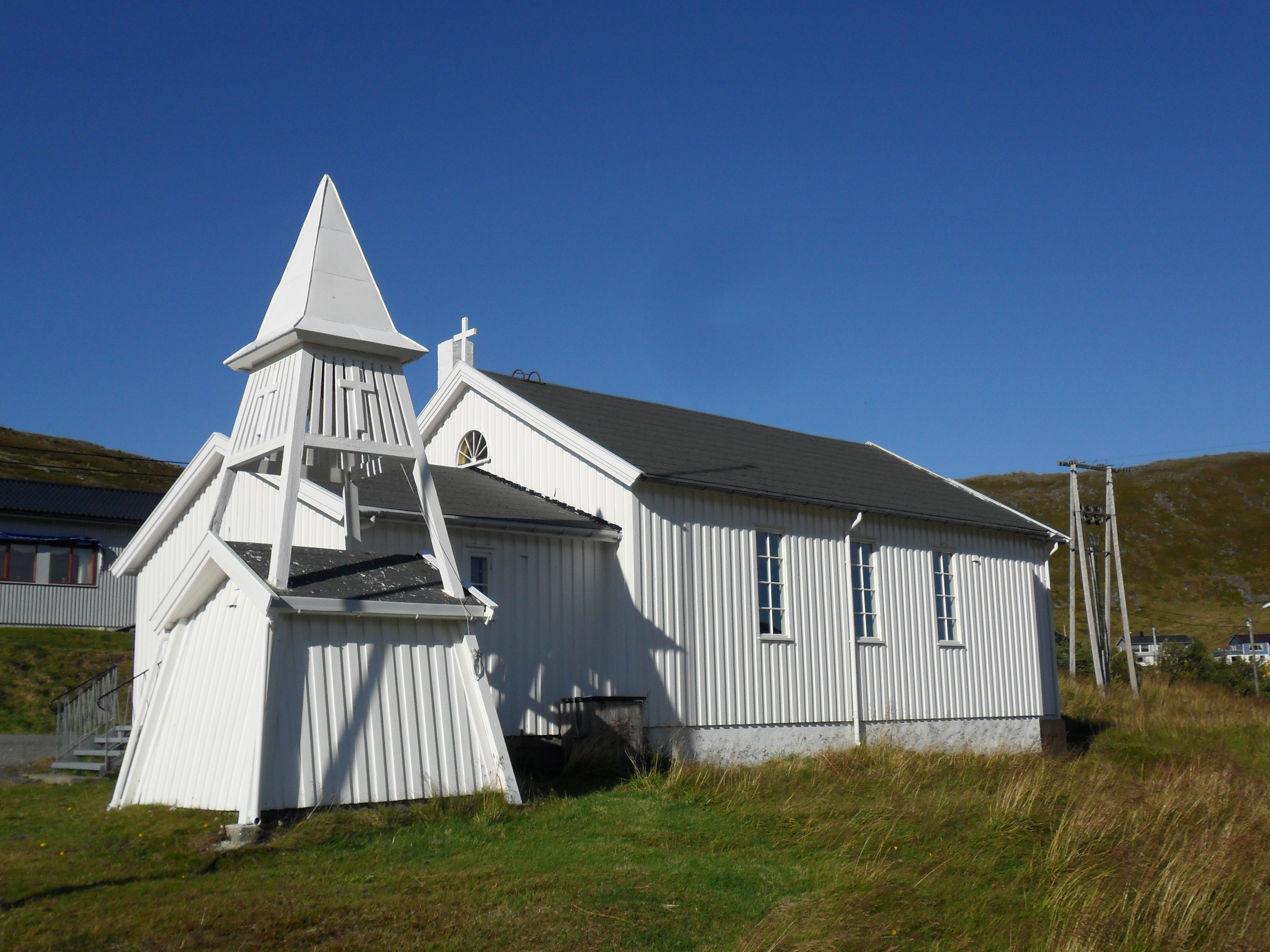

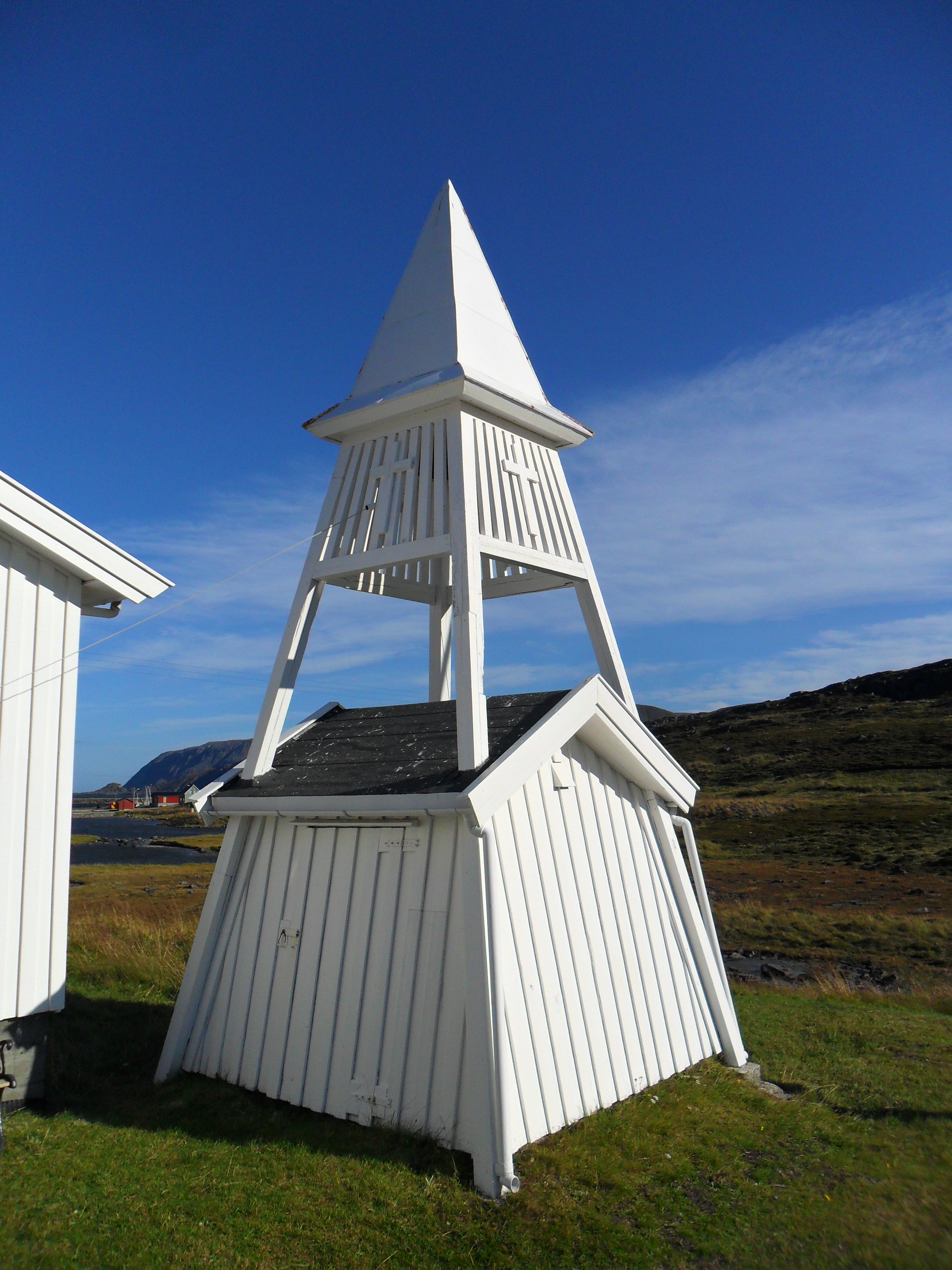

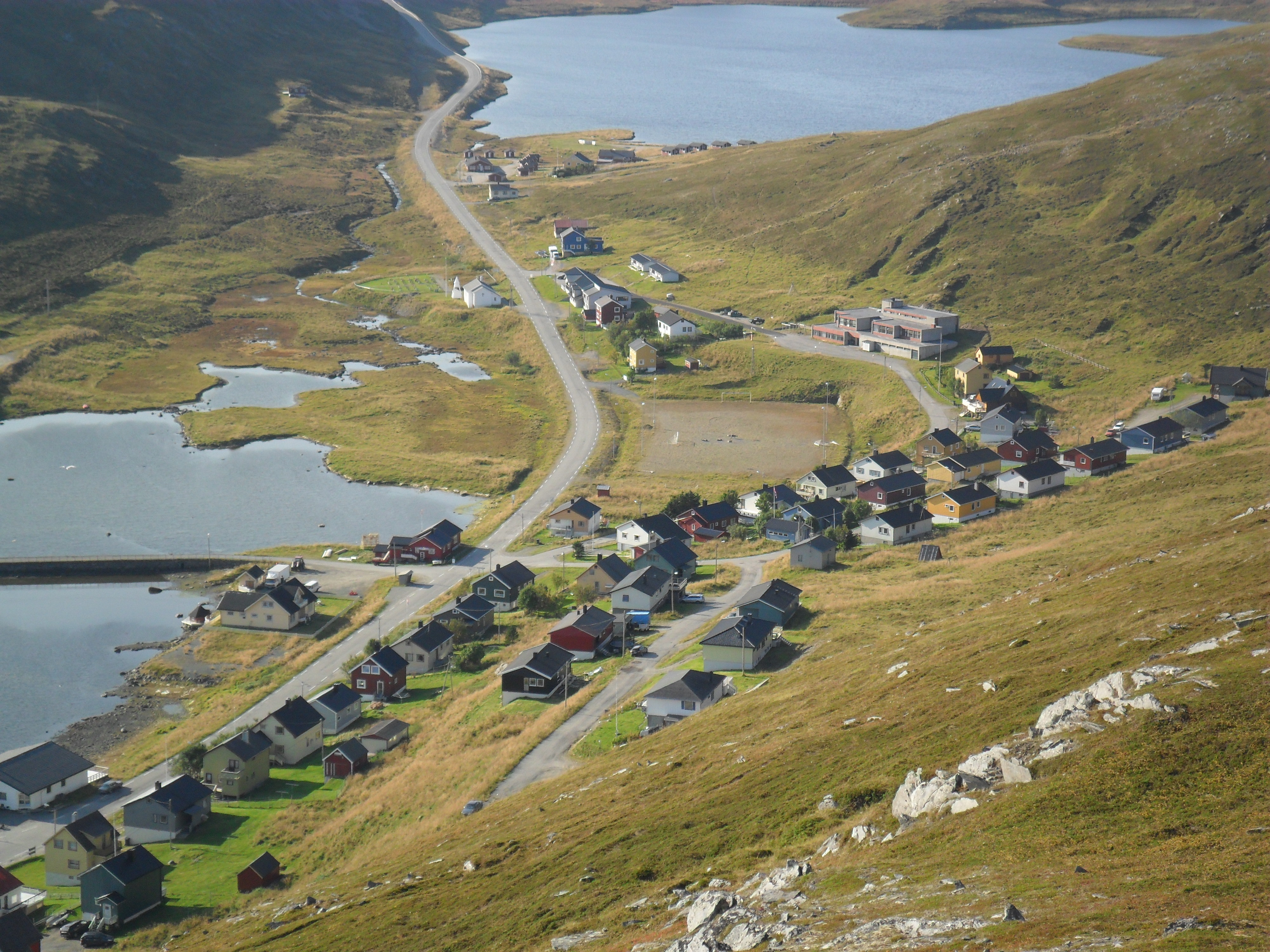

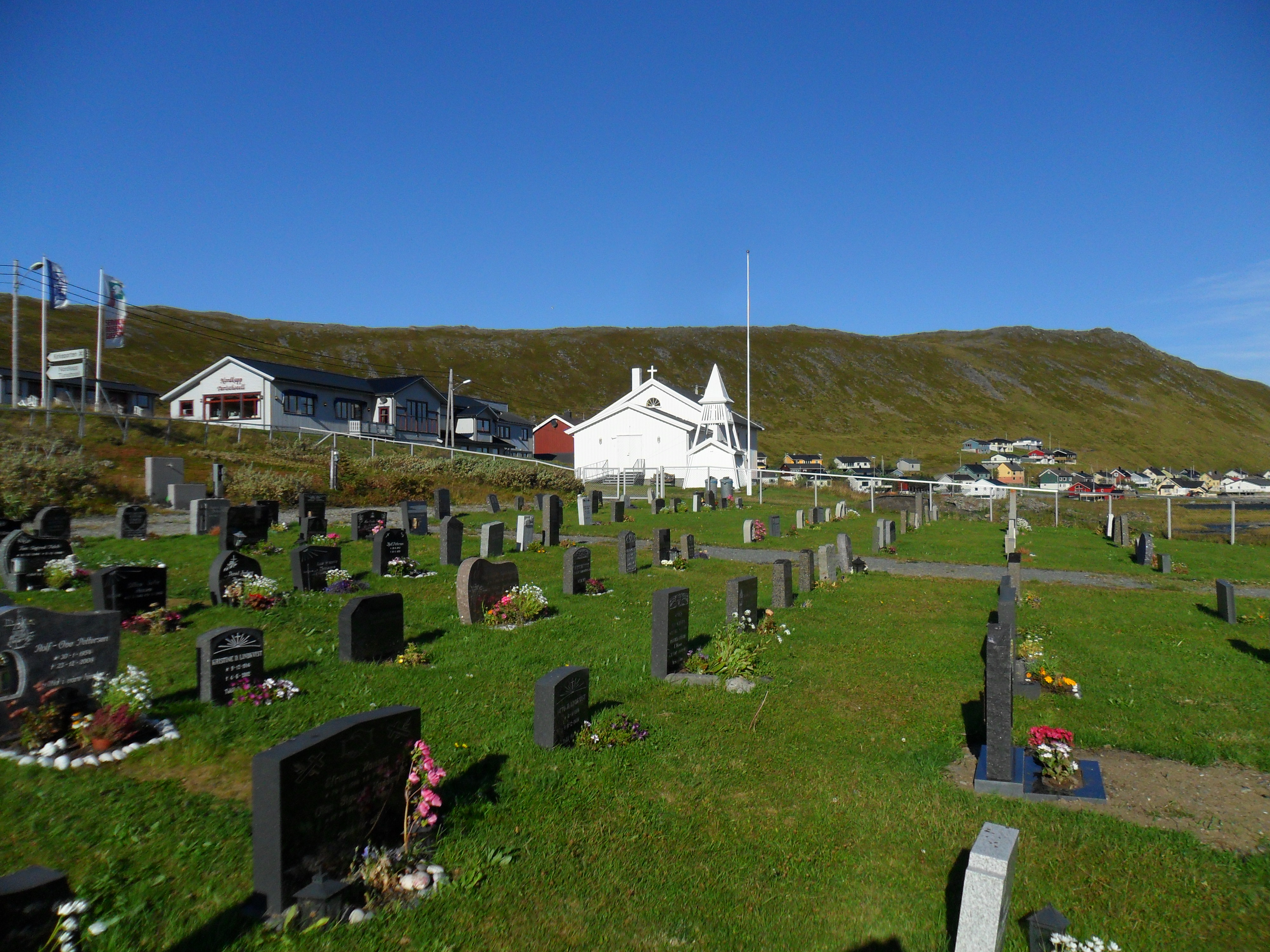

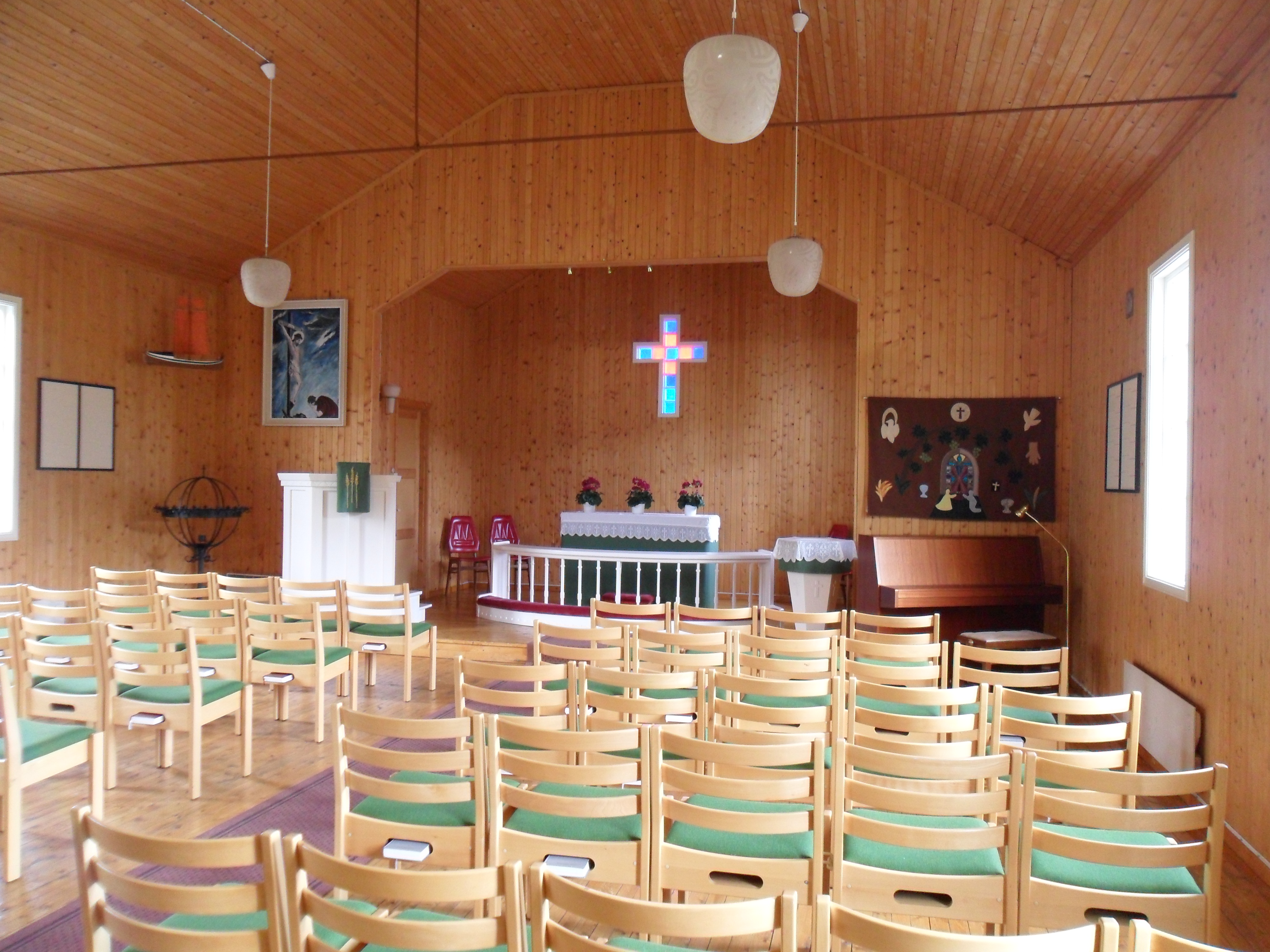

== See also ==
- List of churches in Nord-Hålogaland
