= Birtavarre =

Village in Kvænangen, Norway

Birtavarre: Birtavarre (Norwegian); Biertavárri (Northern Sami); Pirttivaara (Kven); Kåfjordbotn
- Village
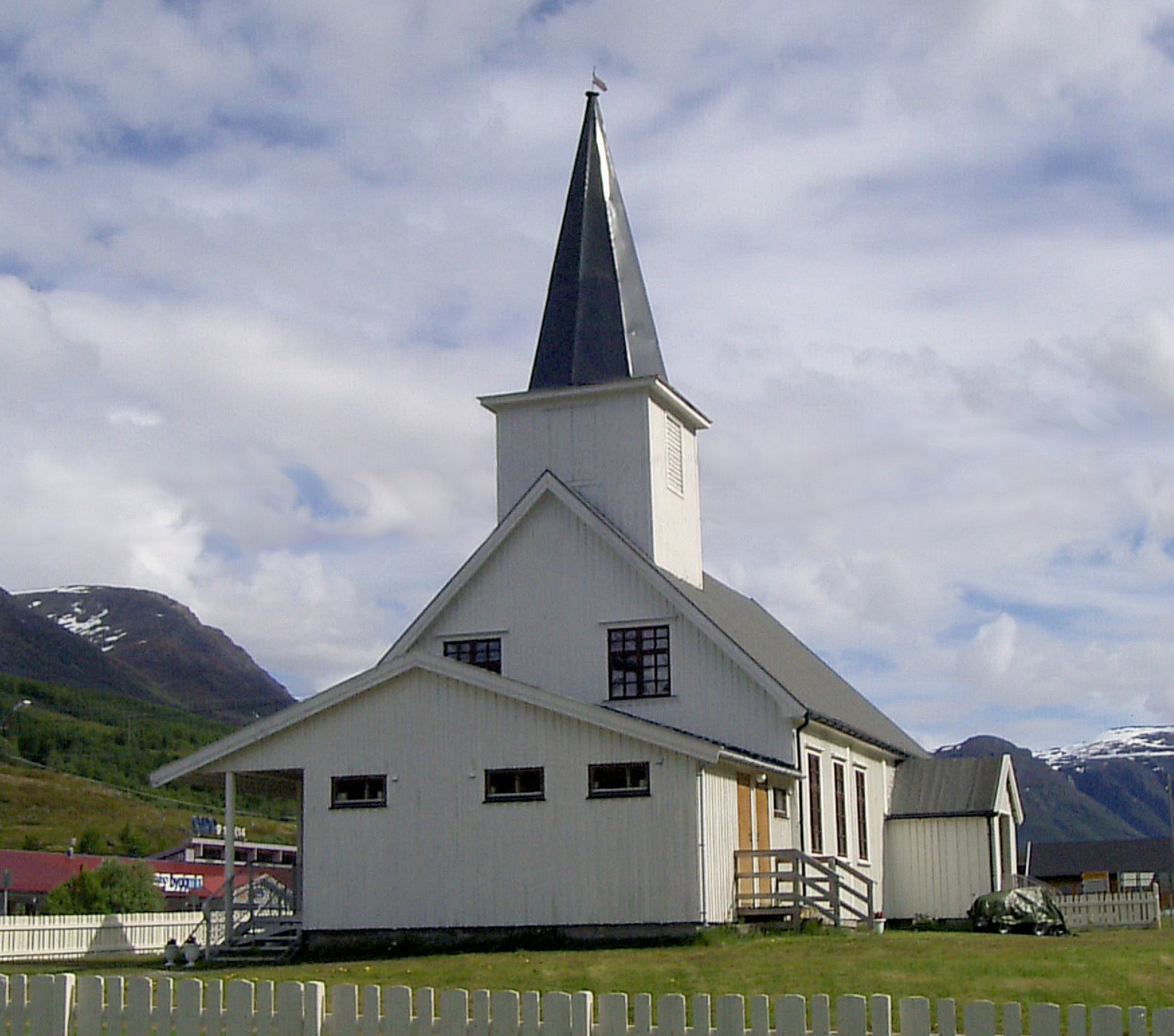
- View of the village chapel
- Interactive map of Birtavarre
- Location within Troms Location within Norway
- Coordinates: 69.49517°N 20.83036°E
- Country: Norway
- Region: Northern Norway
- County: Troms
- District: Nord-Troms
- Municipality: Gáivuotna Municipality

Area
  - Total: 0.37 km^{2} (0.14 sq mi)
- Elevation: 10 m (33 ft)

Population (2023)
  - Total: 231
  - Density: 624/km^{2} (1,620/sq mi)
- Time zone: UTC+01:00 (CET)
  - Summer (DST): UTC+02:00 (CEST)
- Post Code: 9147 Birtavarre

Birtavarre (Norwegian), Biertavárri (Northern Sami), or Pirttivaara (Kven) is a village in Gáivuotna Municipality (also known as Kåfjord Municipality) in Troms county, Norway. The village is located along the Kåfjordelva river (Northern Sami: Gáivuoneatnu) at the end of the Kåfjorden in the Kåfjorddalen valley. The whole area around the end of the fjord is called Kåfjordbotn (Northern Sami: Gáivuonbahta).

The 0.37-square-kilometre (91-acre) village has a population (2023) of 231 and a population density of 624 inhabitants per square kilometre (1,620/sq mi).

Birtavarre is located along European route E6 about 18.3 km (11.4 mi) southeast of the municipal centre of Olderdalen (on the north side of the fjord) and about 12.5 km (7.8 mi) southeast of Samuelsberg and Manndalen (on the south side of the fjord). Birtavarre Chapel is also located in the village.

== Name ==
Birtavarre is an old mining town with smelters in Ankerlia that are preserved by the Nord-Troms Museum. It was during the mining period that the village adopted the name Birtavarre. Up until that time the area had been called Kåfjordbotn, meaning the end of the Kåfjorden. Since there was also mining in the village of Kåfjord in the nearby Alta Municipality, many workers ended up in the wrong Kåfjord. The name was changed simply for the practical reason of avoiding confusion. The present name for the village comes from the nearby mountain Pirttivaara which derives from an old Kven language name.
