= Honningsvåg Church =

- Honningsvåg kirke
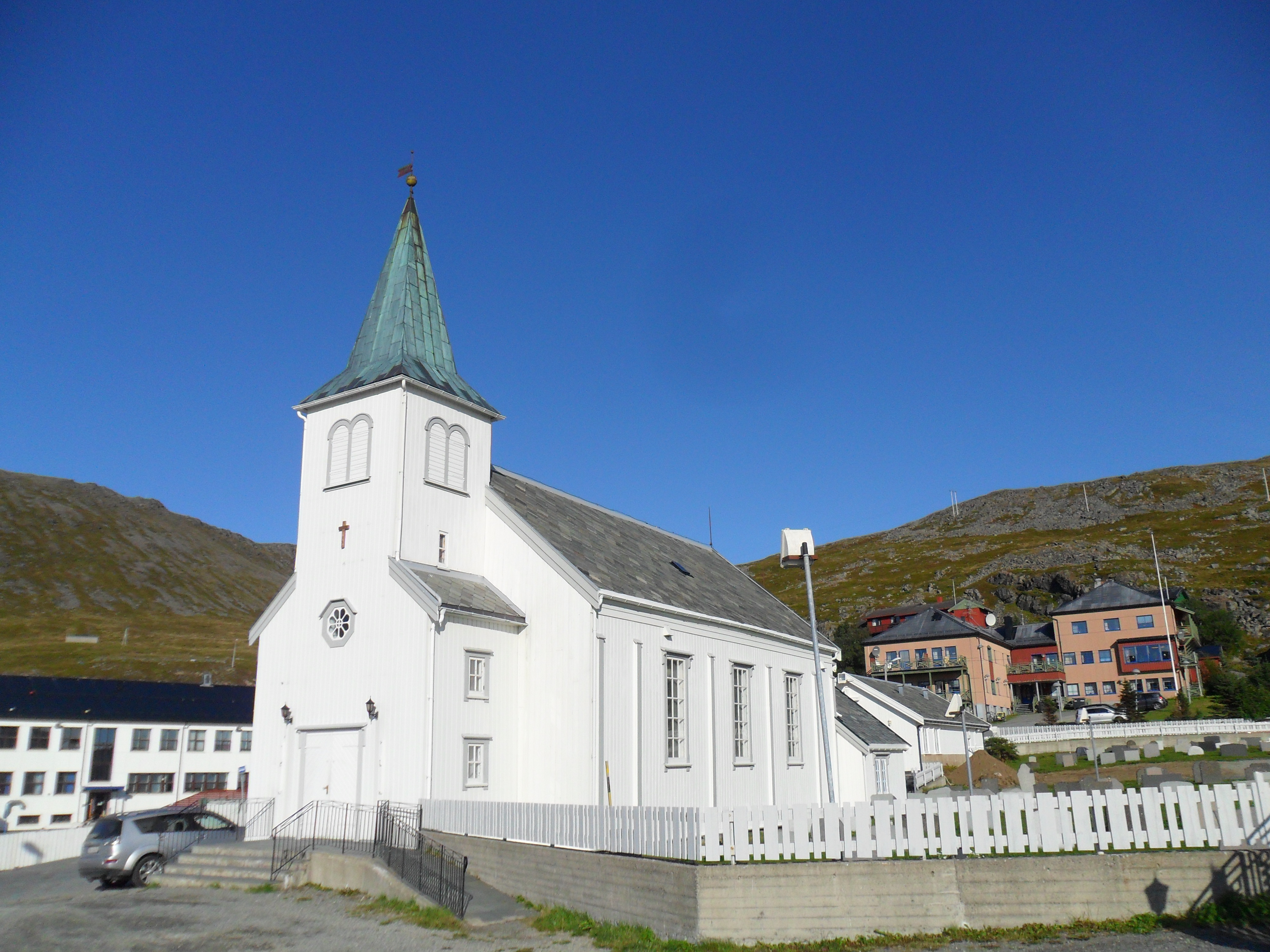
- View of the church
- Honningsvåg Church
- 70.977979°N 25.9791389°E
- Location: Nordkapp Municipality, Finnmark
- Country: Norway
- Denomination: Church of Norway
- Previous denomination: Catholic Church
- Churchmanship: Evangelical Lutheran

History
- Former name: Kjelvik kirke
- Status: Parish church
- Founded: 16th century
- Consecrated: 1885

Architecture
- Functional status: Active
- Architect: Jacob Wilhelm Nordan
- Architectural type: Long church
- Style: Neo-Gothic
- Completed: 1885 (141 years ago)

Specifications
- Capacity: 220
- Materials: Wood

Administration
- Diocese: Nord-Hålogaland
- Deanery: Hammerfest prosti
- Parish: Nordkapp
- Norwegian Cultural Heritage Site
- Type: Church
- Status: Listed
- ID: 84623

Honningsvåg Church (Norwegian: Honningsvåg kirke) is a parish church of the Church of Norway in Nordkapp Municipality in Finnmark county, Norway. It is located in the town of Honningsvåg on the eastern end of the island of Magerøya. It is one of the churches for the Nordkapp parish which is part of the Hammerfest prosti (deanery) in the Diocese of Nord-Hålogaland. The white, neo-Gothic, wooden church was built in a long church style in 1885 using plans drawn up by the architect Jacob Wilhelm Nordan. The church seats about 220 people.

== History ==
Throughout the Middle Ages, there were many churches on the island of Magerøya, but none in Honningsvåg until relatively recently. The earliest existing historical records of the predecessors of this church date back to the year 1556, but the church was not new that year. The church was located in the now-abandoned village of Kjelvik, about 5 kilometres (3.1 mi) north of the present church site. The old church was a timber-framed building with a small tower on the roof. In 1704, a new entry porch was built at the west entrance. In the late 1730s, the old church was heavily repaired and rebuilt. In 1810, the English navy held a blockade around the area and during the fighting that ensued, the church was significantly damaged. The church was rebuilt with an octagonal design. In the winter of 1882, the church was destroyed by a hurricane.

After this, it was decided to build the replacement church in the nearby village of Honningsvåg instead of in Kjelvik because that area was more easily accessible and was closer to the population of the municipality. The land for the new church was donated by Karesius Løkke. The new church was consecrated on 22 October 1885 by the Reverend Mr. Balke, a priest from Karasjok Church.

This is one of the few churches in Finnmark county that was not destroyed or burned at the end of World War II during the retreat of the German forces. After the war, the church became home for the local population while the remaining buildings were reconstructed.

== Media gallery ==
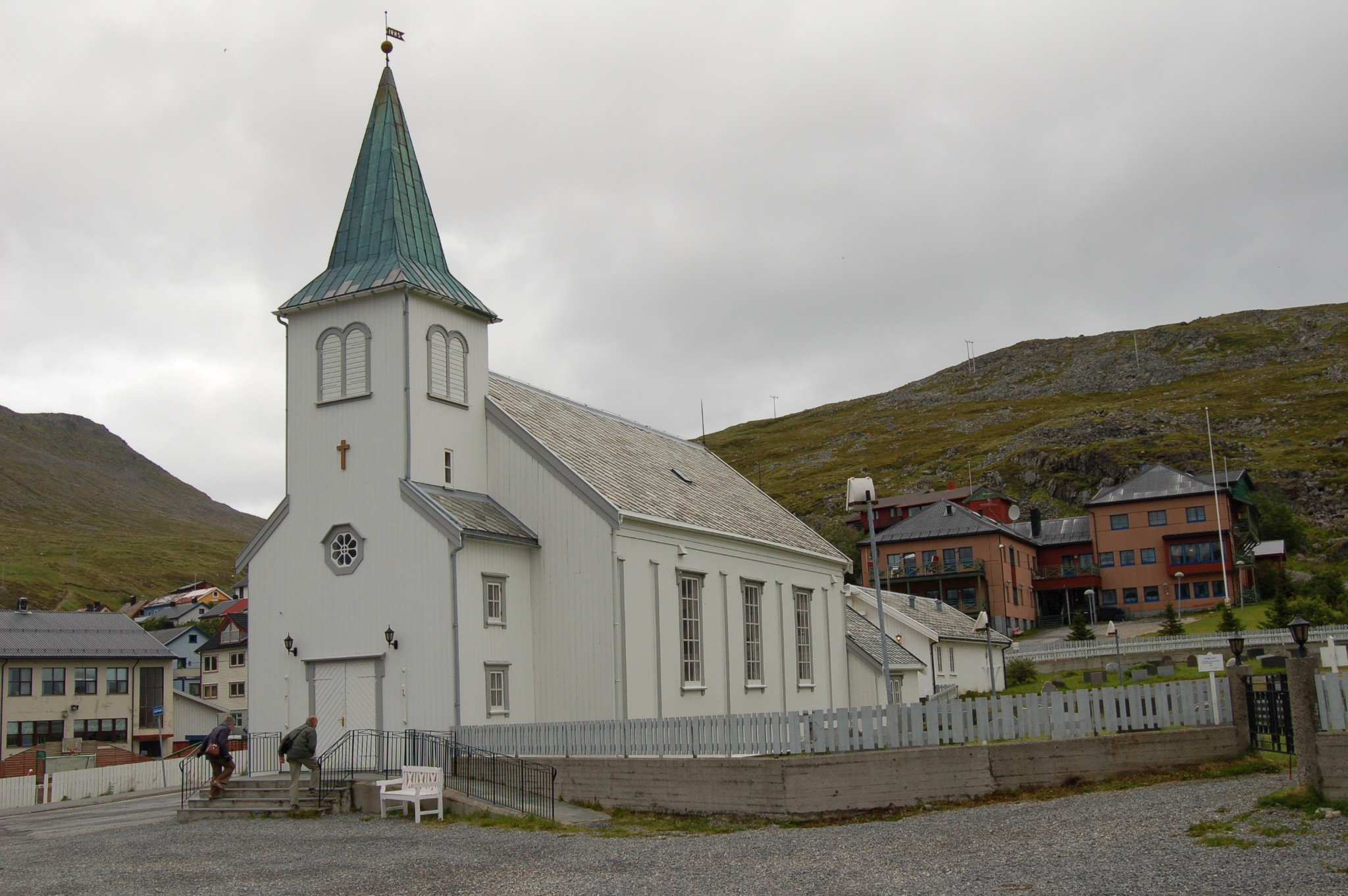

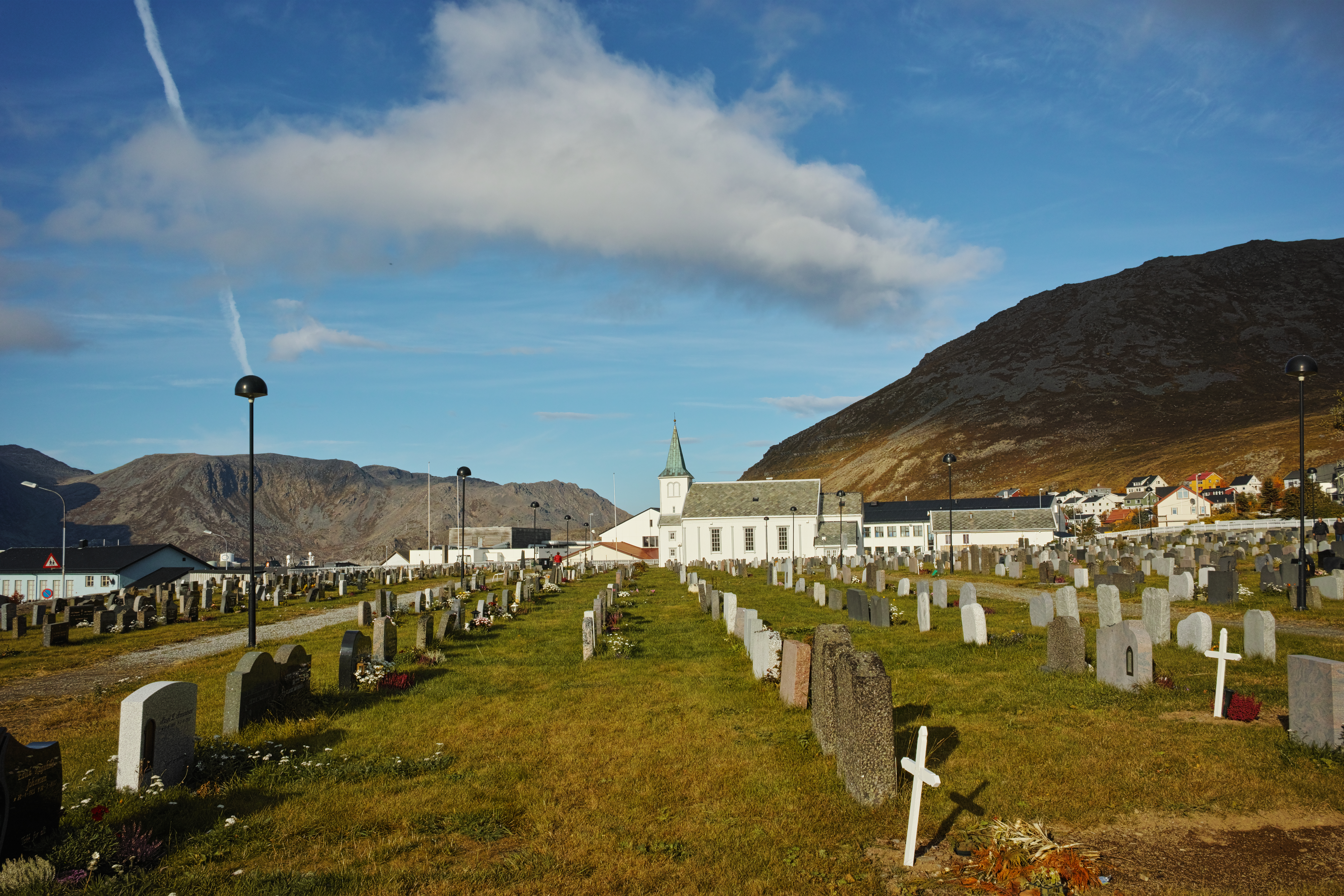

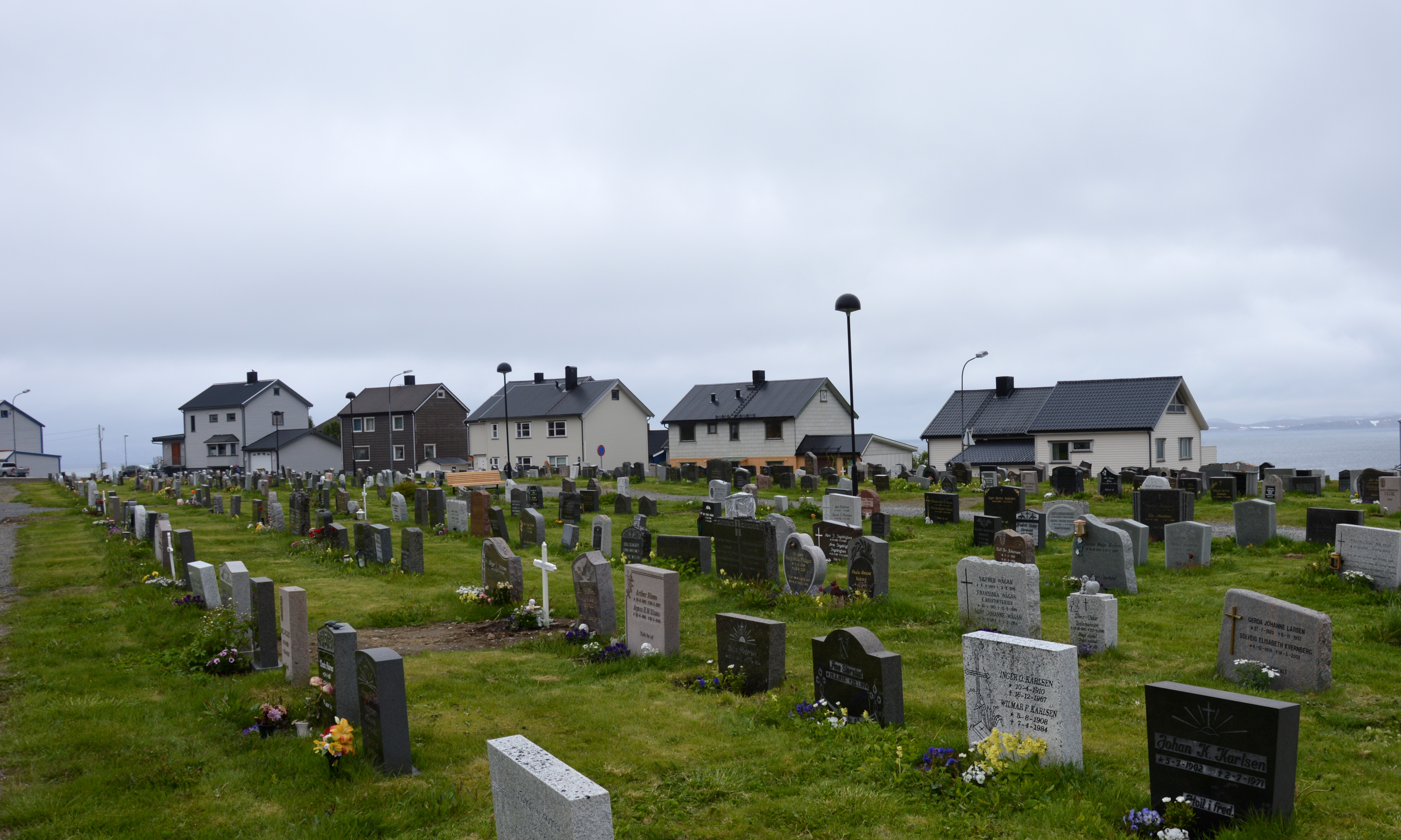

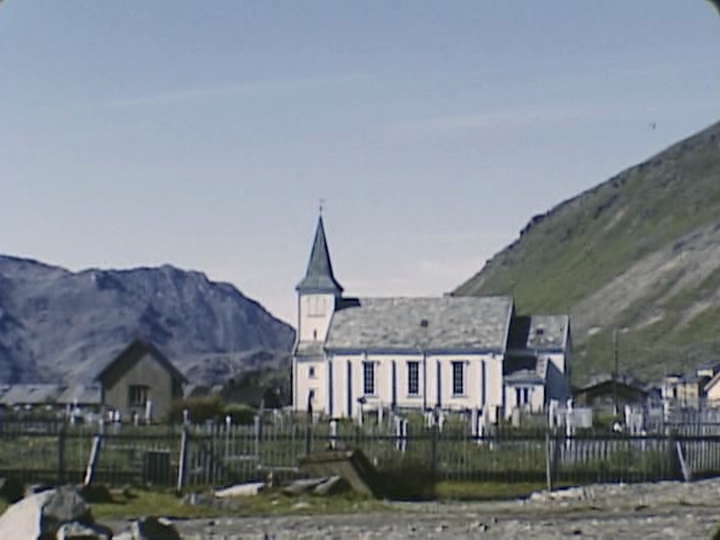

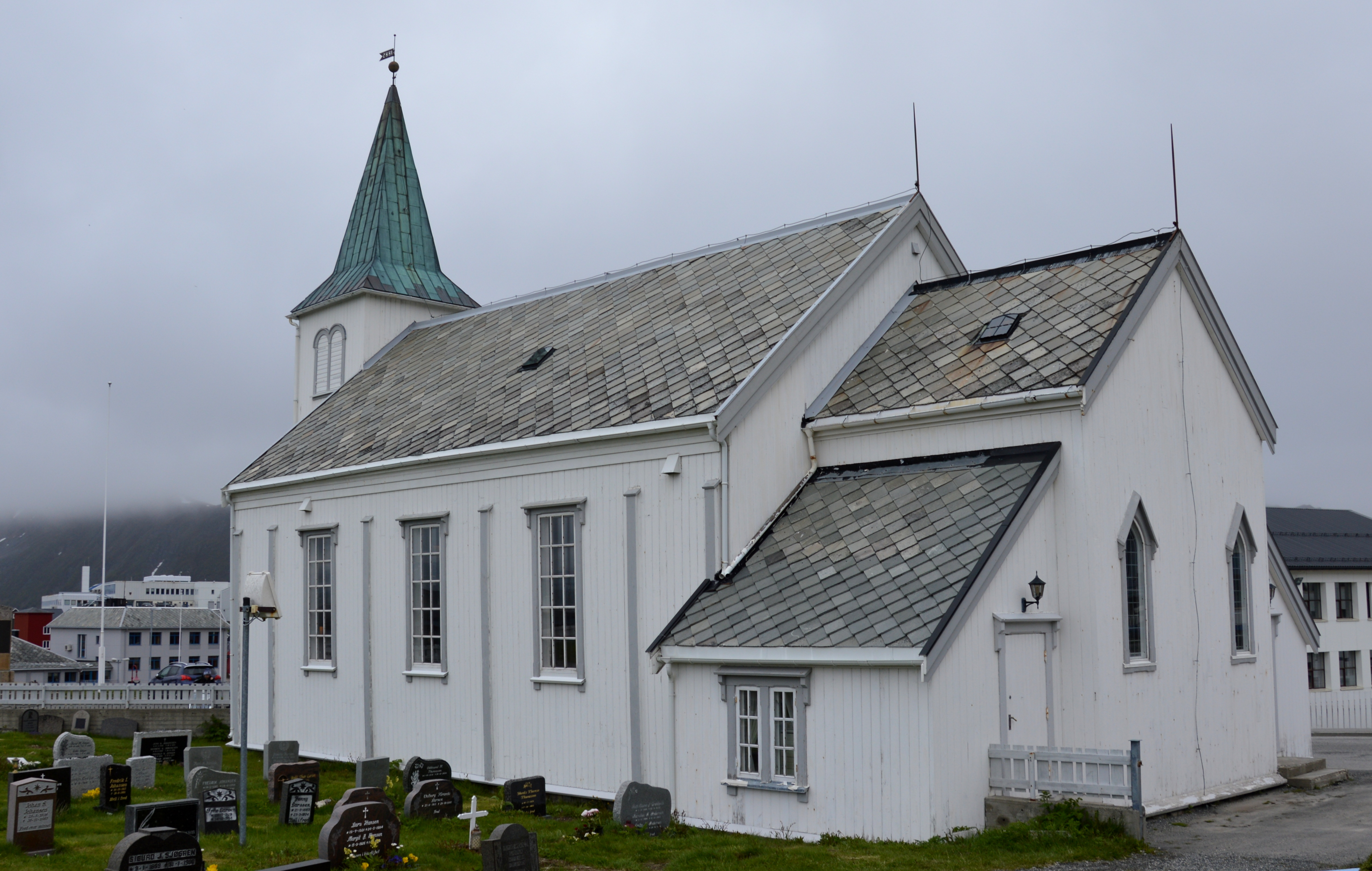

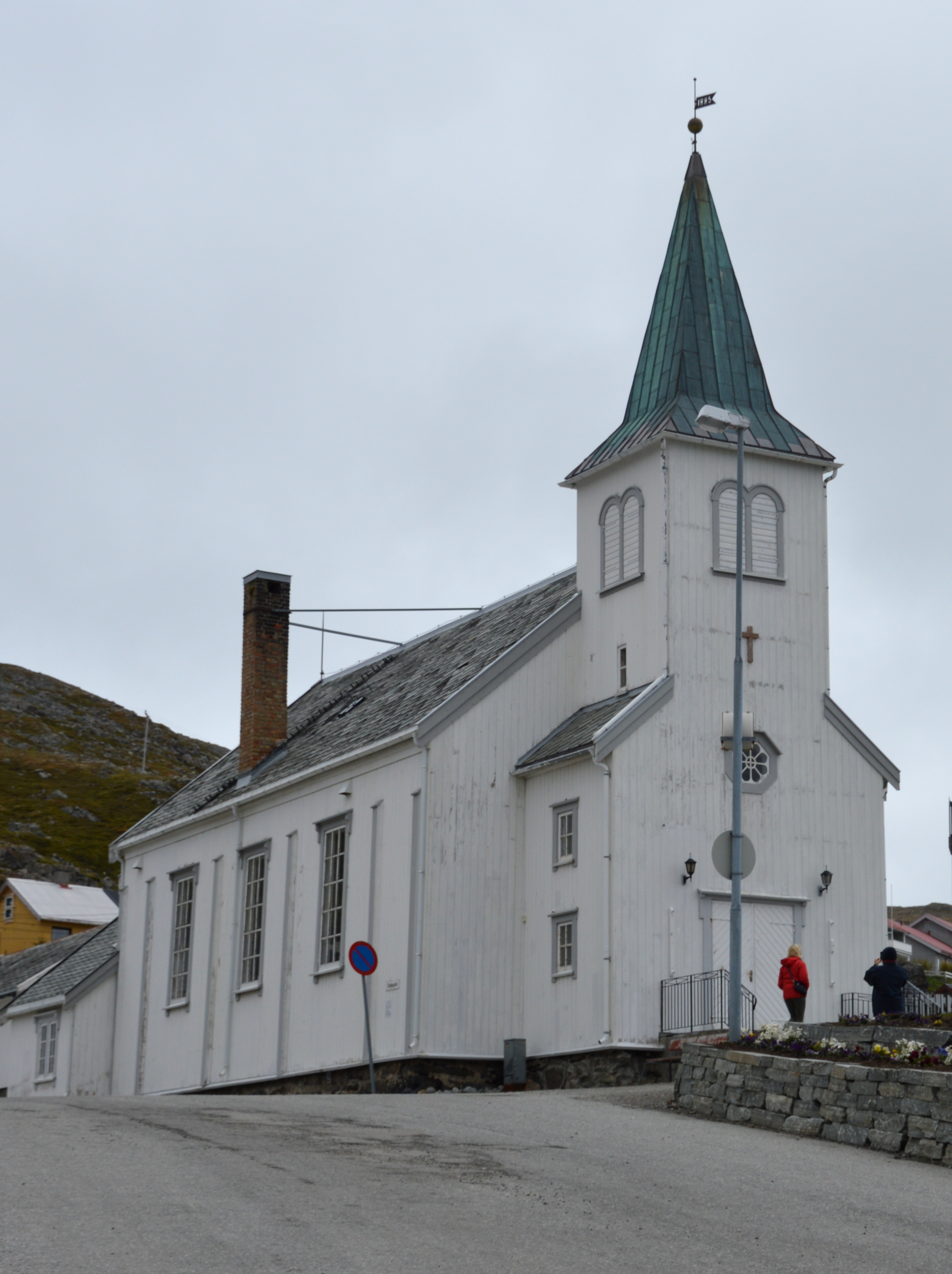

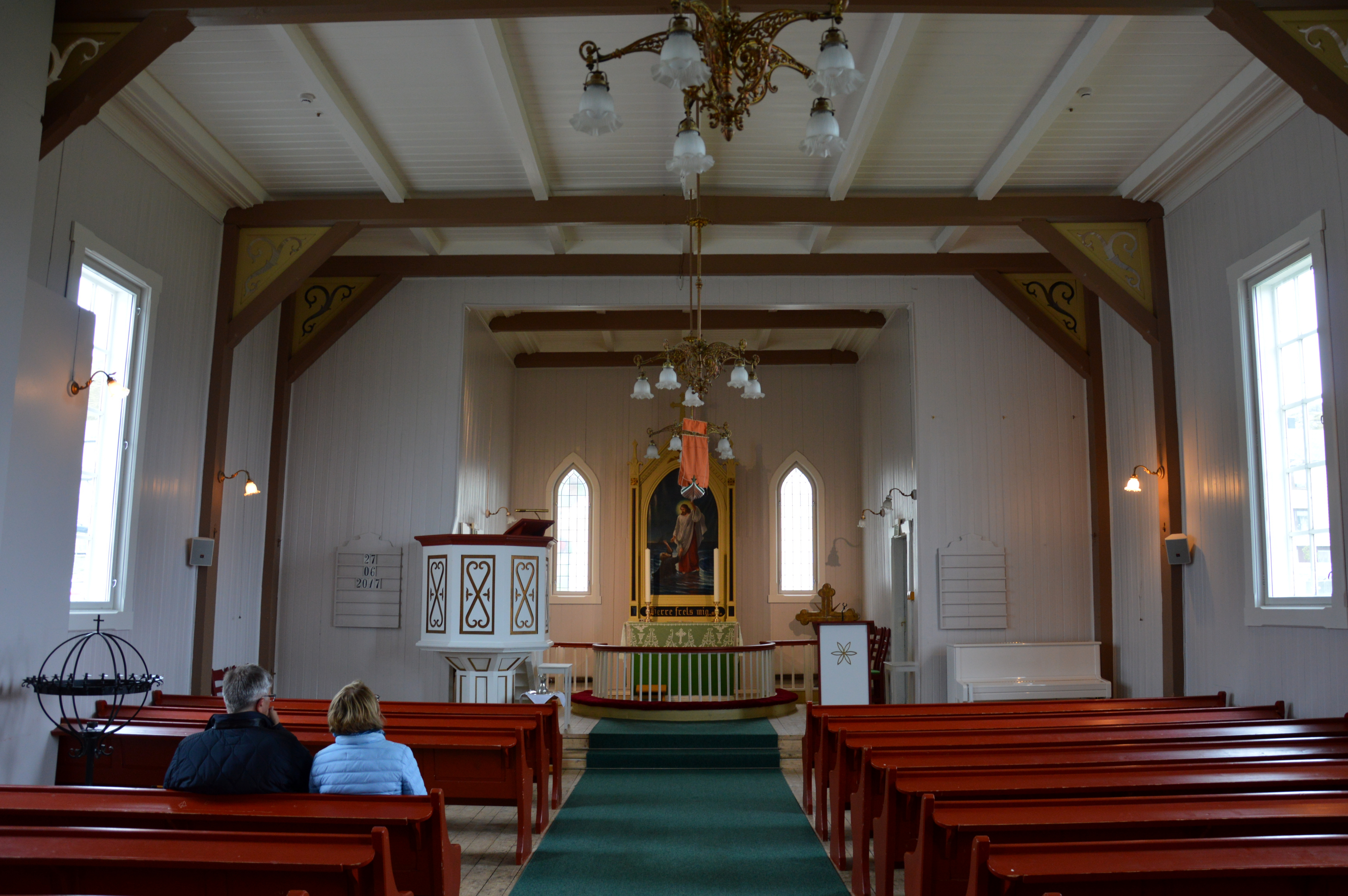

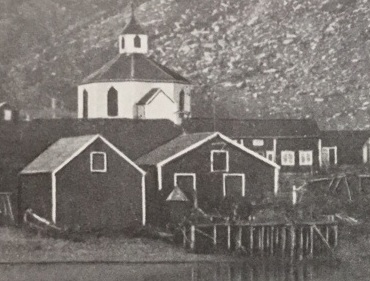
View of the old church in Kjelvik

== See also ==
- List of churches in Nord-Hålogaland
