= Kåfjorden (Troms) =

Fjord in Troms, Norway

Kåfjorden (Norwegian); Gáivuotna (Northern Sami); Kaivuono (Kven)
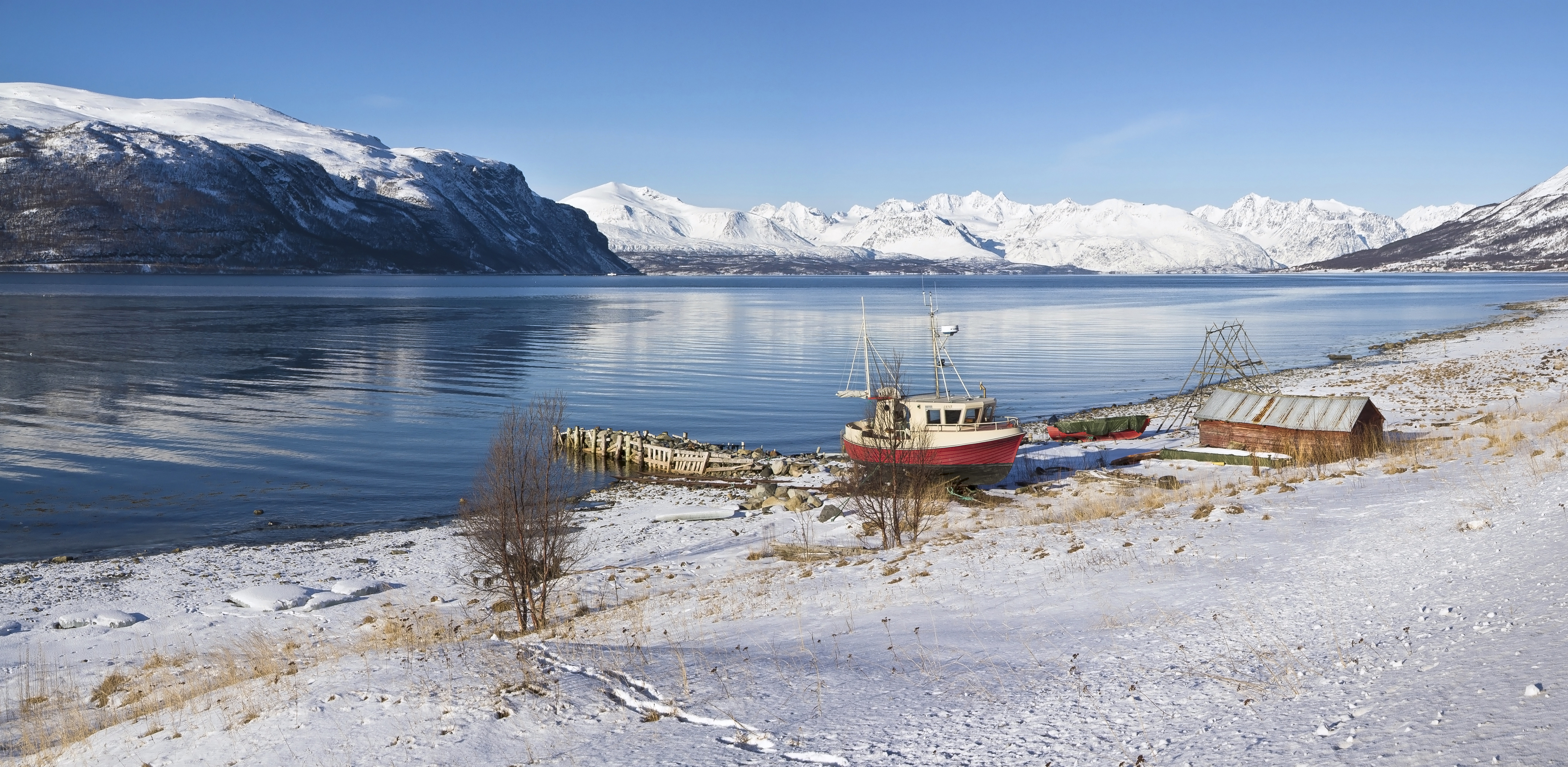
- View of the fjord
- Interactive map of the fjord
- Location: Troms county, Norway
- Coordinates: 69.51746°N 20.72914°E
- Type: Fjord
- Basin countries: Norway
- Max. length: 20 kilometres (12 mi)
- Max. width: 3.5 kilometres (2.2 mi)
- Settlements: Birtavarre, Olderdalen

Kåfjorden (Norwegian), Gáivuotna (Northern Sami), or Kaivuono (Kven) is a fjord in Gáivuotna Municipality (also known as Kåfjord Municipality) in Troms county, Norway. The 20-kilometre (12 mi) long fjord is a branch off the main Lyngen fjord stretching further inland to the village of Birtavarre. The European route E06 highway runs around the entire fjord.

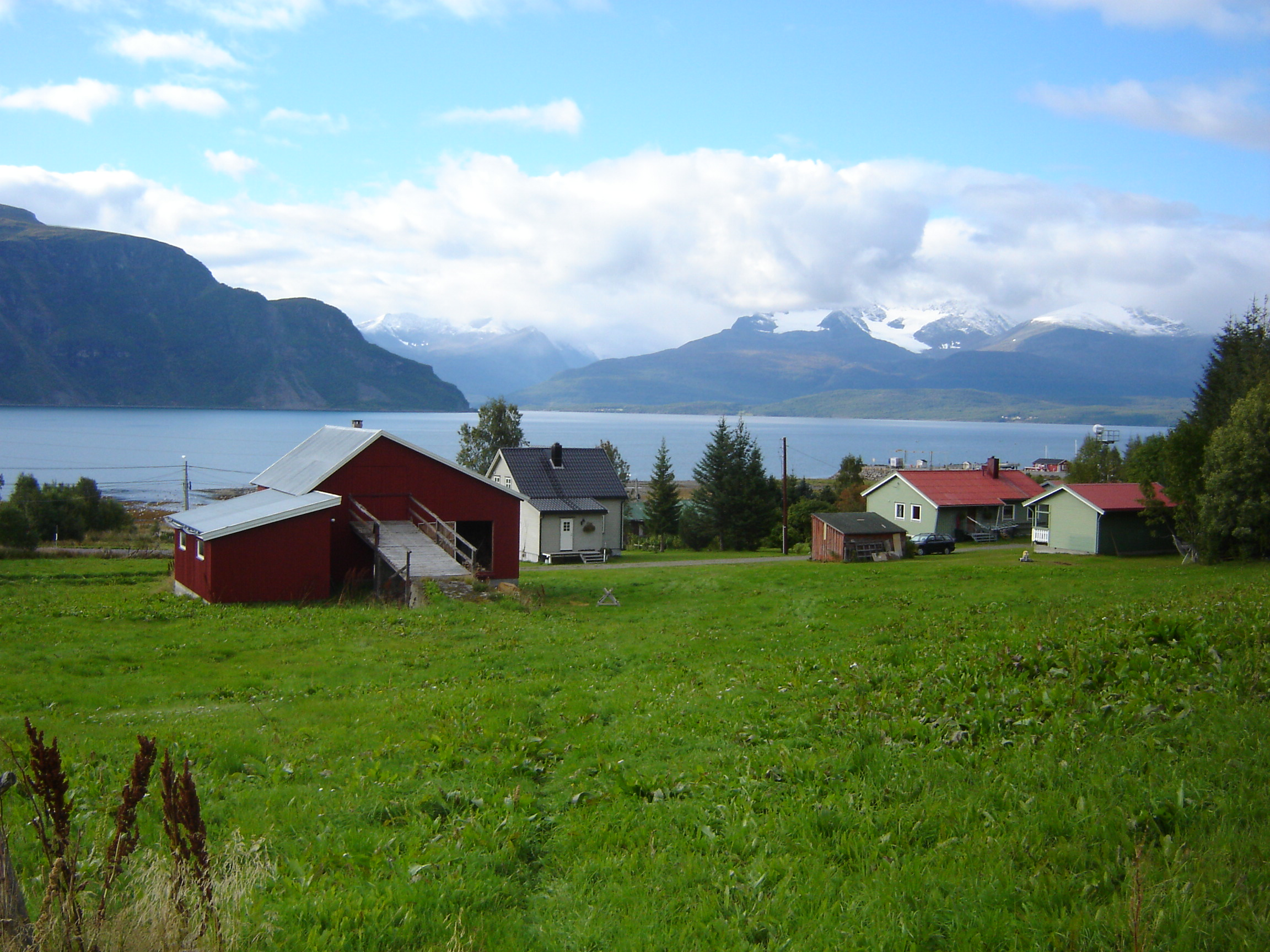
View of the fjord

== See also ==
- List of Norwegian fjords
