= Kåfjord, Nordkapp =

Kåfjord
- Village
- Interactive map of Kåfjord
- Location within Finnmark Location within Norway
- Coordinates: 70°52′34″N 25°45′19″E
- Country: Norway
- Region: Northern Norway
- County: Finnmark
- District: Vest-Finnmark
- Municipality: Nordkapp Municipality
- Elevation: 10 m (33 ft)
- Time zone: UTC+01:00 (CET)
  - Summer (DST): UTC+02:00 (CEST)
- Post Code: 9768 Repvåg

Kåfjord is a small village in Nordkapp Municipality in Finnmark county, Norway. It is located on the Porsanger Peninsula, along the Kåfjorden, an arm of the main Porsangerfjorden.

Before the completion of the North Cape Tunnel on the European route E69 highway in June 1999, Kåfjord was the southern terminus of the ferry route between the mainland and the town of Honningsvåg on the island of Magerøya.
