= North Cape Tunnel =

Subsea road tunnel in Norway

North Cape Tunnel Nordkapptunnelen (Norwegian)
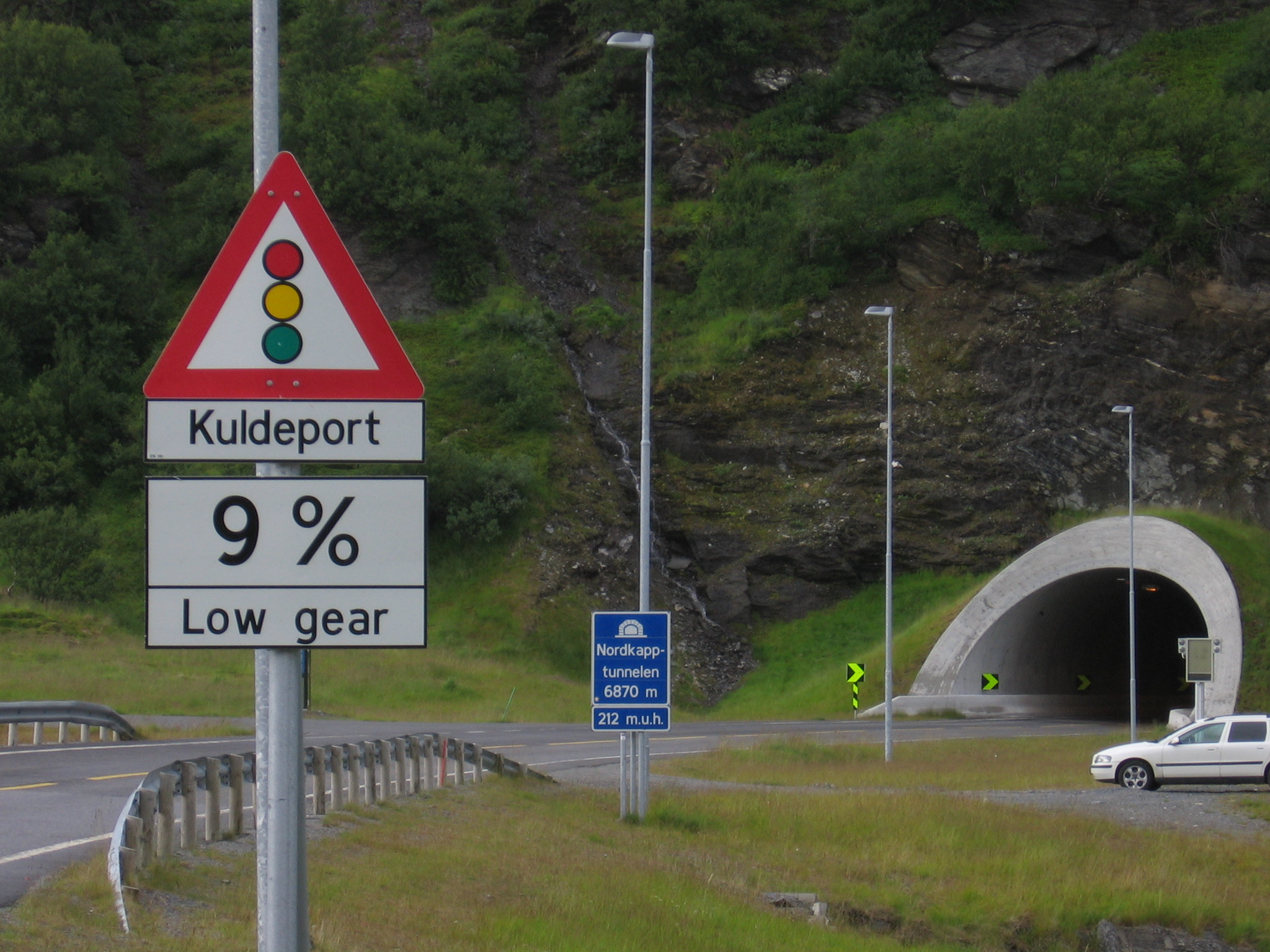
- View of the entrance from the mainland side.
- Interactive map of North Cape Tunnel; Nordkapptunnelen (Norwegian)

Overview
- Location: Finnmark, Norway
- Coordinates: 70.9251°N 25.6971°E
- Status: In operation
- Route: E69
- Start: Porsanger Peninsula; 70°53′30″N 25°41′00″E
- End: Magerøya; 70°57′00″N 25°42′20″E

Operation
- Work began: 1993
- Opened: 15 June 1999
- Operator: Statens vegvesen
- Character: Automotive
- Toll: No

Technical
- Length: 6.875 kilometres (4.3 mi)
- Min elevation: −212 metres (−696 ft)
- Grade: 9%

North Cape Tunnel (Norwegian: Nordkapptunnelen) is one of the longest and the northernmost of the subsea road tunnels in Norway. It is located in Nordkapp Municipality in Finnmark county in the far northern part of Norway. The tunnel takes the European route E69 highway under the Magerøysundet strait between the Norwegian mainland and the large island of Magerøya. The tunnel was built between 1993 and 1999, along with the Honningsvåg Tunnel. The tunnels were built to connect the mainland of Norway with the town of Honningsvåg and the tourist attraction at the North Cape. The tunnel was officially opened on 15 June 1999 by King Harald V of Norway. The tunnel is 6.875 kilometres (4.272 mi) long and reaches a depth of 212 metres (696 ft) below sea level. Before the tunnel was built, a ferry carried the traffic across the sea between the village of Kåfjord and the town of Honningsvåg.

The tunnel takes its name from the North Cape on the northern shore of Magerøya island. North Cape Tunnel is part of the European route E69 highway. Since 29 June 2012, there is no longer a toll for passing through the tunnel. Before this date there was a toll of 145 kr per car, plus an additional 47 kr per adult and 24 kr per child, in each direction.

The tunnel has automatic anti-freezing doors (Norwegian: kuldeport) which close the mouths of the tunnel in the winter to avoid the freezing of any leaking water. These gates open automatically when cars approach and are permanently open in the summer, when traffic is denser.
