= Kåfjord Church =

- Kåfjord kirke
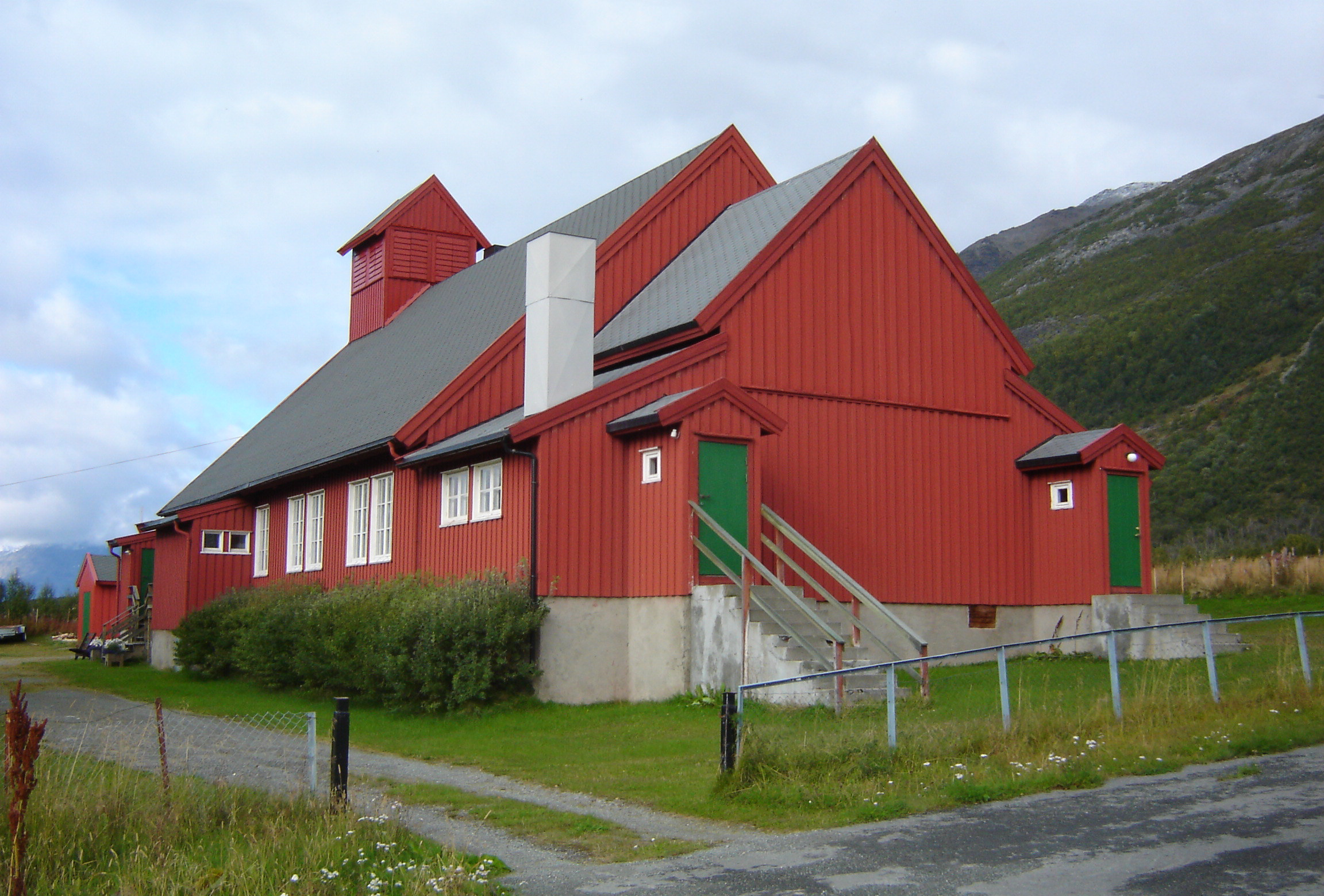
- View of the church
- Kåfjord Church
- 69.601602°N 20.546812°E
- Location: Kåfjord Municipality, Troms
- Country: Norway
- Denomination: Church of Norway
- Churchmanship: Evangelical Lutheran

History
- Status: Parish church
- Founded: 1722 (304 years ago)
- Consecrated: 1949 (77 years ago)

Architecture
- Functional status: Active
- Architect: Kirsten Sand
- Architectural type: Long church
- Completed: 1949 (77 years ago)

Specifications
- Capacity: 250
- Materials: Wood

Administration
- Diocese: Nord-Hålogaland
- Deanery: Nord-Troms prosti
- Parish: Kåfjord
- Norwegian Cultural Heritage Site
- Type: Church
- Status: Not protected
- ID: 84879

Kåfjord Church (Norwegian: Kåfjord kirke) is a parish church of the Church of Norway in Gáivuotna Municipality (Kåfjord) in Troms county, Norway. It is located in the village of Olderdalen. It is the church for the Kåfjord parish which is part of the Nord-Troms prosti (deanery) in the Diocese of Nord-Hålogaland. The red, wooden church was built in a long church style in 1949 using plans drawn up by the architect Kirsten Sand. The church seats about 250 people.

== History ==
The first chapel building in Kåfjord was built in 1722 in connection with the Sami mission led by Thomas von Westen. It was known as the Finnekapellet. The chapel was about 7 to 8 metres (23 to 26 ft) long and it was used until around the year 1800. After that time, residents would travel to the Lyngen Church, about 15 kilometres (9.3 mi) down the fjord. It wasn't until 1949 when Kåfjord its first official church building. Kåfjord Church was built on the initiative of the inhabitants of the village of Olderdalen who collected funds and reused materials to build it. The church was renovated in 1989-1990.

== See also ==
- List of churches in Nord-Hålogaland
