= Honningsvåg Tunnel =

Road tunnel in Nordkapp Municipality, Finnmark county, Norway

Honningsvåg Tunnel Honningsvågtunnelen
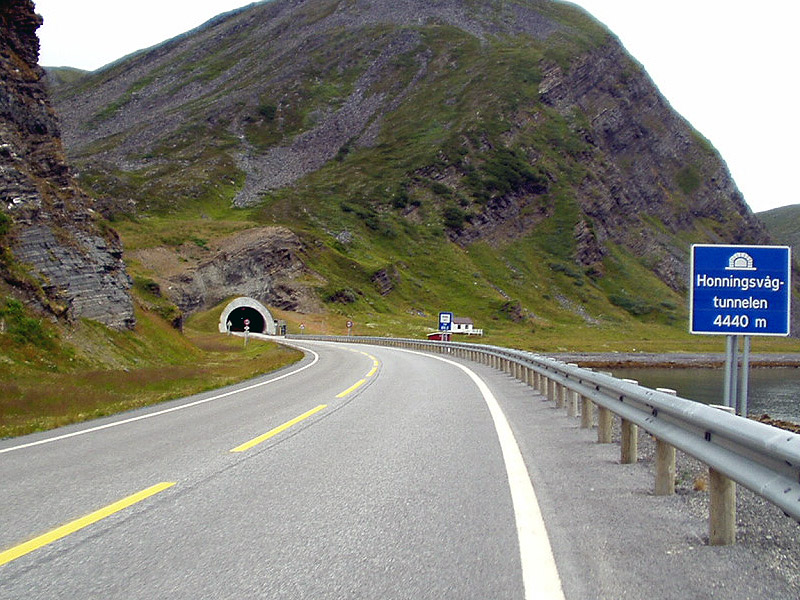
- View of the tunnel

Overview
- Location: Finnmark, Norway
- Coordinates: 70.9851°N 25.8697°E
- Status: In use
- Route: E69
- Start: 70°58′40″N 25°50′30″E
- End: 70°59′20″N 25°55′00″E

Operation
- Opened: 15 June 1999
- Operator: Statens vegvesen

Technical
- Length: 4,443 metres (14,577 ft)
- No. of lanes: 2
- Width: 9 metres (30 ft)

The Honningsvåg Tunnel (Norwegian: Honningsvågtunnelen) is a road tunnel on the island of Magerøya in Nordkapp Municipality in Finnmark county, Norway. It is located slightly north of the undersea North Cape Tunnel, and it is part of the European route E69 highway.

The 4,443-metre (14,577 ft) long tunnel opened on 15 June 1999, on the same date as the North Cape Tunnel, as part of a large project to connect the mainland of Norway to North Cape. This tunnel goes through a large mountain called "Honningsvågfjellet" west of the town of Honningsvåg. The 9-metre (30 ft) wide tunnel has 2 lanes (one in each direction). It is the northernmost public road tunnel in the world.
