= Kåfjord Municipality =

Municipality in Troms, Norway

Kåfjord Municipality Kåfjord kommune Gáivuona suohkan Kaivuonon komuuni
- Municipality
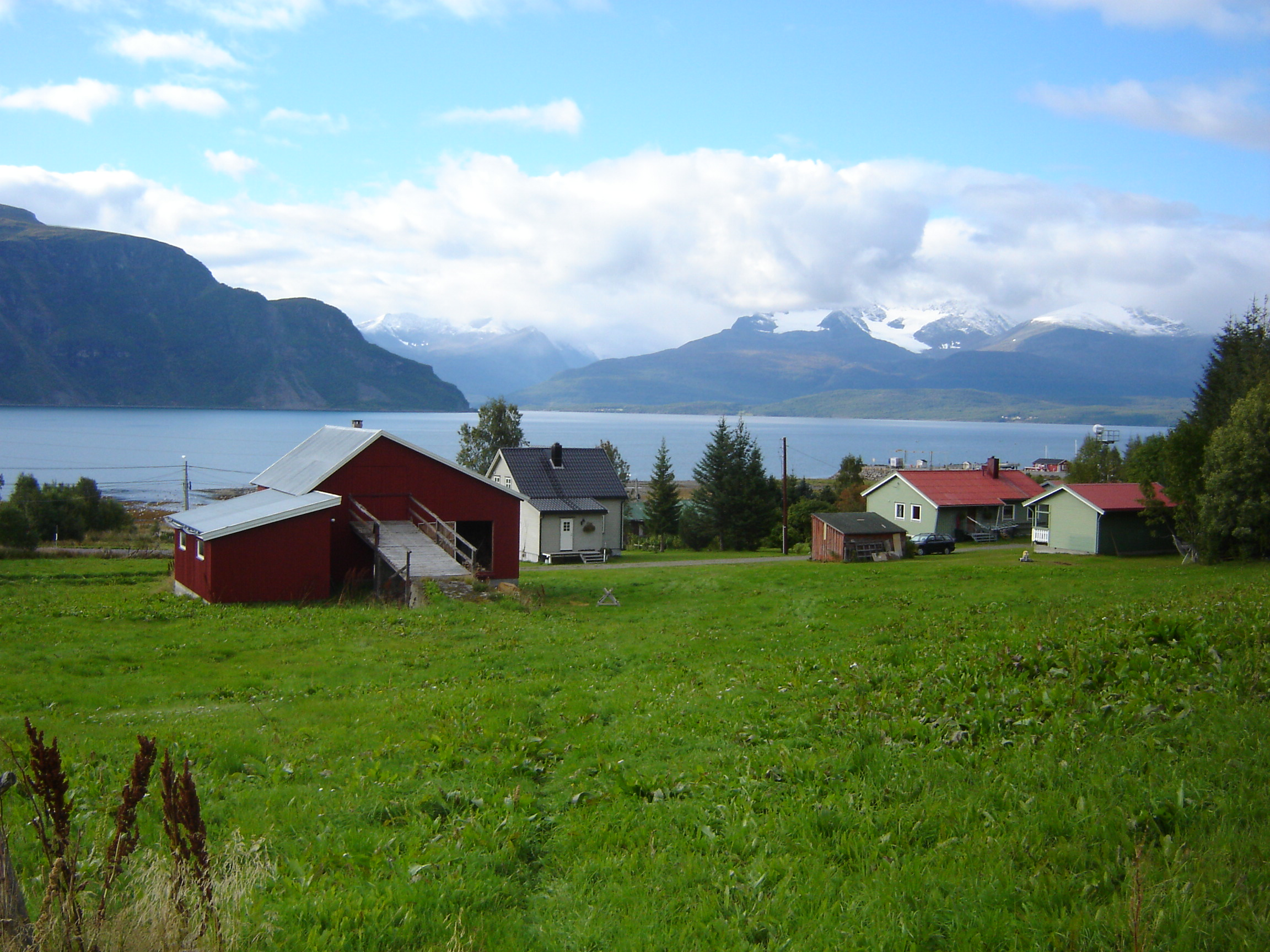
- View of Olderdalen

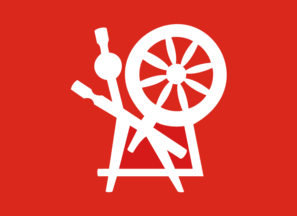
- Flag Coat of arms

- Troms within Norway

- Kåfjord within Troms
- Coordinates: 69°36′14″N 20°31′57″E
- Country: Norway
- County: Troms
- District: Nord-Troms
- Established: 21 June 1929
  - Preceded by: Lyngen Municipality
- Administrative centre: Olderdalen

Government
  - Mayor (2019): Bernt Eirik Isaksen Lyngstad (Ap)

Area
  - Total: 991.15 km^{2} (382.69 sq mi)
  - Land: 949.56 km^{2} (366.63 sq mi)
  - Water: 41.59 km^{2} (16.06 sq mi) 4.2%
  - Rank: #116 in Norway
- Highest elevation: 1,375.4 m (4,512 ft)

Population (2024)
  - Total: 1,974
  - Rank: #283 in Norway
  - Density: 2/km^{2} (5.2/sq mi)
  - Change (10 years): ▼ −11.1%
- Demonym: Kåfjording

Official languages
  - Norwegian form: Bokmål
  - Sámi form: Northern Sami
- Time zone: UTC+01:00 (CET)
  - Summer (DST): UTC+02:00 (CEST)
- ISO 3166 code: NO-5540
- Website: Official website

Kåfjord (Norwegian), Gáivuotna [ˈkaːjːvuo̯tna] (Northern Sami), or Kaivuono (Kven) is a municipality in Troms county, Norway. The administrative centre of the municipality is the village of Olderdalen. Other notable villages include Løkvollen, Manndalen, Birtavarre, Trollvik, Samuelsberg, Nordmannvik, and Djupvik.

The 991-square-kilometre (383 sq mi) municipality is the 116th largest by area out of the 357 municipalities in Norway. Kåfjord is the 283rd most populous municipality in Norway with a population of 1,974. The municipality's population density is 2 inhabitants per square kilometre (5.2/sq mi) and its population has decreased by 11.1% over the previous 10-year period.

== General information ==
The municipality of Kåfjord was established by a royal resolution that was approved on 21 June 1929 when the large Lyngen Municipality was divided into three: Lyngen in the northwest, Kåfjord in the northeast, and Storfjord Municipality in the south. The initial population of Kåfjord was 2,482. Then on 1 January 1992, the Nordnes area along the Lyngen fjord in Lyngen Municipality (population: 38) was transferred to Kåfjord Municipality.

On 1 January 2020, the municipality became part of the newly formed Troms og Finnmark county. Previously, it had been part of the old Troms county. On 1 January 2024, the Troms og Finnmark county was divided and the municipality once again became part of Troms county.

=== Name ===
The municipality is named after the local Kåfjorden (Old Norse: Kofafjǫrðr). The meaning of the name is uncertain. One explanation is that the first element is derived from the word kofi which means "side-chamber", here in the sense that this fjord is a smaller branch off of a main fjord. The last element is fjǫrðr which means "fjord". Another interpretation is that the name is a Norwegianized form of the Sámi language name Gáivuotna. The first element of the Sami name has an unknown meaning. The last element is vuotna which means "fjord". Thus its semi-translated name is something like "Gai-fjord" which could sound like the Norwegian name "Kåfjord".

The name of the municipality was simply Kåfjord from its establishment in 1926 until 2 May 1994 when the name was changed to Gáivuotna–Kåfjord. This new name combined the Sami and Norwegian names into one. It was the fifth municipality in Norway to get a Sami name. In 2005, the name was again changed such that either the Sami name (Gáivuotna) or the Norwegian name (Kåfjord) could be used interchangeably. In 2016, the name was changed again. This time, the Kven language name was added to the list of official names. All three names are equal and parallel names for the municipality. The spelling of the Sami and Kven language names change depending on how they are used. In Sami, it is called Gáivuotna when it is spelled alone, but it is Gáivuona suohkan when using the Sami language equivalent to "Kåfjord municipality". In Kven, it is called Kaivuono when it is spelled alone, but it is Kaivuonon komuuni when using the Kven language equivalent to "Kåfjord municipality".

=== Coat of arms ===
The coat of arms was granted on 20 January 1989. The official blazon is "Gules, a spinning wheel argent" (Norwegian: I rødt en sølv rokk). This means the arms have a red field (background) and the charge is a spinning wheel. The spinning wheel has a tincture of argent which means it is commonly colored white, but if it is made out of metal, then silver is used. The spinning wheel was chosen because it is a timeless symbol. Handicrafts have long and particular traditions in Kåfjord. It is also a unifying symbol for Kåfjord's population since many residents (at the time of the adoption of the arms) had had a spinning wheel in their homes while they were growing up. It also is meant as a symbol of frugality, self-sufficiency, and an industrious people. The arms were designed by Harald O. Lindbach.

=== Churches ===
The Church of Norway has one parish (sokn) within Kåfjord Municipality. It is part of the Nord-Troms prosti (deanery) in the Diocese of Nord-Hålogaland.

Churches in Kåfjord Municipality
Parish (sokn)	Church name	Location of the church	Year built
Kåfjord	Kåfjord Church	Olderdalen	1949
Kåfjord	Birtavarre Chapel	Birtavarre	1937

== History ==
In 1945, the villages of Kåfjord Municipality were burned to the ground during the retreat of German forces from Finland and Finnmark. This was as far west as the Wehrmacht used their scorched earth tactics.

== Government ==
Kåfjord Municipality is responsible for primary education (through 10th grade), outpatient health services, senior citizen services, welfare and other social services, zoning, economic development, and municipal roads and utilities. The municipality is governed by a municipal council of directly elected representatives. The mayor is indirectly elected by a vote of the municipal council. The municipality is under the jurisdiction of the Nord-Troms og Senja District Court and the Hålogaland Court of Appeal.

=== Municipal council ===
The municipal council (Kommunestyre) of Kåfjord Municipality is made up of 17 representatives that are elected to four year terms. The tables below show the current and historical composition of the council by political party.

Gáivuotna Kåfjord Kaivuono kommunestyre 2023–2027
Party name (in Norwegian)	Number of representatives
Labour Party (Arbeiderpartiet)	6
Progress Party (Fremskrittspartiet)	2
Green Party (Miljøpartiet De Grønne)	1
Conservative Party (Høyre)	1
Christian Democratic Party (Kristelig Folkeparti)	3
Centre Party (Senterpartiet)	2
Socialist Left Party (Sosialistisk Venstreparti)	2
Total number of members:	17

Gáivuotna Kåfjord Kaivuono kommunestyre 2019–2023
Party name (in Norwegian)	Number of representatives
Labour Party (Arbeiderpartiet)	8
Progress Party (Fremskrittspartiet)	1
Green Party (Miljøpartiet De Grønne)	1
Conservative Party (Høyre)	1
Christian Democratic Party (Kristelig Folkeparti)	2
Centre Party (Senterpartiet)	4
Total number of members:	17

Gáivuotna Kåfjord Kaivuono kommunestyre 2015–2019
Party name (in Norwegian)	Number of representatives
Labour Party (Arbeiderpartiet)	5
Progress Party (Fremskrittspartiet)	1
Green Party (Miljøpartiet De Grønne)	1
Conservative Party (Høyre)	2
Christian Democratic Party (Kristelig Folkeparti)	2
Centre Party (Senterpartiet)	4
Manndalen, Skardalen, and Nordnes local list (Manndalen, Skardalen og Nordnes bygdeliste)	2
Total number of members:	17

Gáivuotna Kåfjord kommunestyre 2011–2015
Party name (in Norwegian)	Number of representatives
Labour Party (Arbeiderpartiet)	8
Progress Party (Fremskrittspartiet)	2
Christian Democratic Party (Kristelig Folkeparti)	3
Coastal Party (Kystpartiet)	1
Centre Party (Senterpartiet)	2
Kåfjord local list (Kåfjord bygdeliste)	1
Total number of members:	17

Gáivuotna Kåfjord kommunestyre 2007–2011
Party name (in Norwegian)	Number of representatives
Labour Party (Arbeiderpartiet)	10
Progress Party (Fremskrittspartiet)	2
Christian Democratic Party (Kristelig Folkeparti)	3
Centre Party (Senterpartiet)	1
Socialist Left Party (Sosialistisk Venstreparti)	1
Total number of members:	17

Gáivuotna–Kåfjord kommunestyre 2003–2007
Party name (in Norwegian)	Number of representatives
Labour Party (Arbeiderpartiet)	6
Christian Democratic Party (Kristelig Folkeparti)	3
Centre Party (Senterpartiet)	1
Socialist Left Party (Sosialistisk Venstreparti)	3
Outer Kåfjord local list (Ytre Kåfjord bydeliste)	2
Inner Kåfjord local list (Indre Kåfjord bydeliste)	2
Total number of members:	17

Gáivuotna–Kåfjord kommunestyre 1999–2003
Party name (in Norwegian)	Number of representatives
Labour Party (Arbeiderpartiet)	4
Christian Democratic Party (Kristelig Folkeparti)	3
Centre Party (Senterpartiet)	2
Socialist Left Party (Sosialistisk Venstreparti)	1
Outer Kåfjord local list (Ytre Kåfjord bydeliste)	5
Inner Kåfjord local list (Indre Kåfjord bydeliste)	2
Total number of members:	17

Gáivuotna–Kåfjord kommunestyre 1995–1999
Party name (in Norwegian)	Number of representatives
Labour Party (Arbeiderpartiet)	5
Christian Democratic Party (Kristelig Folkeparti)	5
Centre Party (Senterpartiet)	2
Socialist Left Party (Sosialistisk Venstreparti)	1
Outer Kåfjord local list (Ytre Kåfjord bydeliste)	5
Inner Kåfjord local list (Indre Kåfjord bydeliste)	3
Total number of members:	21

Kåfjord kommunestyre 1991–1995
Party name (in Norwegian)	Number of representatives
Labour Party (Arbeiderpartiet)	6
Christian Democratic Party (Kristelig Folkeparti)	2
Centre Party (Senterpartiet)	2
Socialist Left Party (Sosialistisk Venstreparti)	3
Outer Kåfjord local list (Ytre Kåfjord bydeliste)	5
Inner Kåfjord local list (Indre Kåfjord bydeliste)	2
Manndalen local list (Manndalen bygdeliste)	1
Total number of members:	21

Kåfjord kommunestyre 1987–1991
Party name (in Norwegian)	Number of representatives
Labour Party (Arbeiderpartiet)	7
Conservative Party (Høyre)	1
Christian Democratic Party (Kristelig Folkeparti)	2
Centre Party (Senterpartiet)	1
Socialist Left Party (Sosialistisk Venstreparti)	1
Outer Kåfjord local list (Ytre Kåfjord bydeliste)	6
Inner Kåfjord local list (Indre Kåfjord bydeliste)	1
Manndalen-Skardalen local list (Manndalen-Skardalen bygdeliste)	2
Total number of members:	21

Kåfjord kommunestyre 1983–1987
Party name (in Norwegian)	Number of representatives
Labour Party (Arbeiderpartiet)	9
Conservative Party (Høyre)	1
Christian Democratic Party (Kristelig Folkeparti)	4
Centre Party (Senterpartiet)	2
Socialist Left Party (Sosialistisk Venstreparti)	2
Outer Kåfjord local list (Ytre Kåfjord bydeliste)	4
Inner Kåfjord local list (Indre Kåfjord bydeliste)	1
Manndalen and Skardalen local list (Manndalen og Skardalen bygdeliste)	1
Olderdalen local list (Olderdalen bygdeliste)	1
Total number of members:	25

Kåfjord kommunestyre 1979–1983
Party name (in Norwegian)	Number of representatives
Labour Party (Arbeiderpartiet)	9
Conservative Party (Høyre)	2
Christian Democratic Party (Kristelig Folkeparti)	5
Centre Party (Senterpartiet)	2
Socialist Left Party (Sosialistisk Venstreparti)	2
Outer Kåfjord local list (Ytre Kåfjord bydeliste)	5
Total number of members:	25

Kåfjord kommunestyre 1975–1979
Party name (in Norwegian)	Number of representatives
Labour Party (Arbeiderpartiet)	8
Christian Democratic Party (Kristelig Folkeparti)	2
Centre Party (Senterpartiet)	3
Socialist Left Party (Sosialistisk Venstreparti)	3
Outer Kåfjord local list (Ytre Kåfjord bydeliste)	3
Kåfjorddalen and Steinnes local list (Kåfjorddalen og Steinnes Bygdeliste)	4
Manndalen and Skardalen local list (Manndalen og Skardalen bygdeliste)	2
Total number of members:	25

Kåfjord kommunestyre 1971–1975
Party name (in Norwegian)	Number of representatives
Labour Party (Arbeiderpartiet)	9
Centre Party (Senterpartiet)	3
Socialist People's Party (Sosialistisk Folkeparti)	2
Local List(s) (Lokale lister)	11
Total number of members:	25

Kåfjord kommunestyre 1967–1971
Party name (in Norwegian)	Number of representatives
Labour Party (Arbeiderpartiet)	10
Christian Democratic Party (Kristelig Folkeparti)	1
Centre Party (Senterpartiet)	3
Socialist People's Party (Sosialistisk Folkeparti)	2
List of workers, fishermen, and small farmholders (Arbeidere, fiskere, småbrukere liste)	5
Local List(s) (Lokale lister)	4
Total number of members:	25

Kåfjord kommunestyre 1963–1967
Party name (in Norwegian)	Number of representatives
Labour Party (Arbeiderpartiet)	9
Communist Party (Kommunistiske Parti)	1
Local List(s) (Lokale lister)	15
Total number of members:	25

Kåfjord herredsstyre 1959–1963
Party name (in Norwegian)	Number of representatives
Labour Party (Arbeiderpartiet)	11
Communist Party (Kommunistiske Parti)	1
List of workers, fishermen, and small farmholders (Arbeidere, fiskere, småbrukere liste)	5
Local List(s) (Lokale lister)	8
Total number of members:	25

Kåfjord herredsstyre 1955–1959
Party name (in Norwegian)	Number of representatives
Labour Party (Arbeiderpartiet)	12
Communist Party (Kommunistiske Parti)	4
Local List(s) (Lokale lister)	9
Total number of members:	25

Kåfjord herredsstyre 1951–1955
Party name (in Norwegian)	Number of representatives
Labour Party (Arbeiderpartiet)	14
Communist Party (Kommunistiske Parti)	2
Liberal Party (Venstre)	1
Local List(s) (Lokale lister)	3
Total number of members:	20

Kåfjord herredsstyre 1947–1951
Party name (in Norwegian)	Number of representatives
Labour Party (Arbeiderpartiet)	10
Communist Party (Kommunistiske Parti)	1
List of workers, fishermen, and small farmholders (Arbeidere, fiskere, småbrukere liste)	1
Joint List(s) of Non-Socialist Parties (Borgerlige Felleslister)	3
Local List(s) (Lokale lister)	5
Total number of members:	20

Kåfjord herredsstyre 1945–1947
Party name (in Norwegian)	Number of representatives
Labour Party (Arbeiderpartiet)	6
Communist Party (Kommunistiske Parti)	4
Local List(s) (Lokale lister)	10
Total number of members:	20

Kåfjord herredsstyre 1937–1941*
Party name (in Norwegian)	Number of representatives
Labour Party (Arbeiderpartiet)	12
List of workers, fishermen, and small farmholders (Arbeidere, fiskere, småbrukere liste)	5
Joint List(s) of Non-Socialist Parties (Borgerlige Felleslister)	3
Total number of members:	20
Note: Due to the German occupation of Norway during World War II, no elections were held for new municipal councils until after the war ended in 1945.

=== Mayors ===
The mayor (Norwegian: ordfører) of Kåfjord Municipality is the political leader of the municipality and the chairperson of the municipal council. Here is a list of people who have held this position:

- 1929–1942: Anton D. Meedby (LL)
- 1942–1943: Leif Caroliussen (NS)
- 1943–1945: Edvard A. Manndal (NS)
- 1945–1946: Anton D. Meedby (LL)
- 1946–1959: Anton Antonsen (Ap)
- 1960–1963: Peder Sandbukt (Ap)
- 1964–1967: Andor Sandvoll (LL)
- 1968–1971: Hans Berg (Ap)
- 1972–1975: Halfdan Hansen (LL)
- 1976–1977: Peder Sandbukt (LL)
- 1978–1987: Einar Storslett (LL)
- 1988–1989: Ansgar Hansen (LL)
- 1990–1991: Einar Storslett (LL)
- 1991–1993: Terje Solberg (LL)
- 1993–1999: Åge B. Pedersen (Ap)
- 1999–2003: Kristin Vatnelid Johansen (LL)
- 2003–2015: Bjørn Inge Mo (Ap)
- 2015–2019: Svein O. Leiros (Sp)
- 2019–present: Bernt Eirik Isaksen Lyngstad (Ap)

== Geography ==
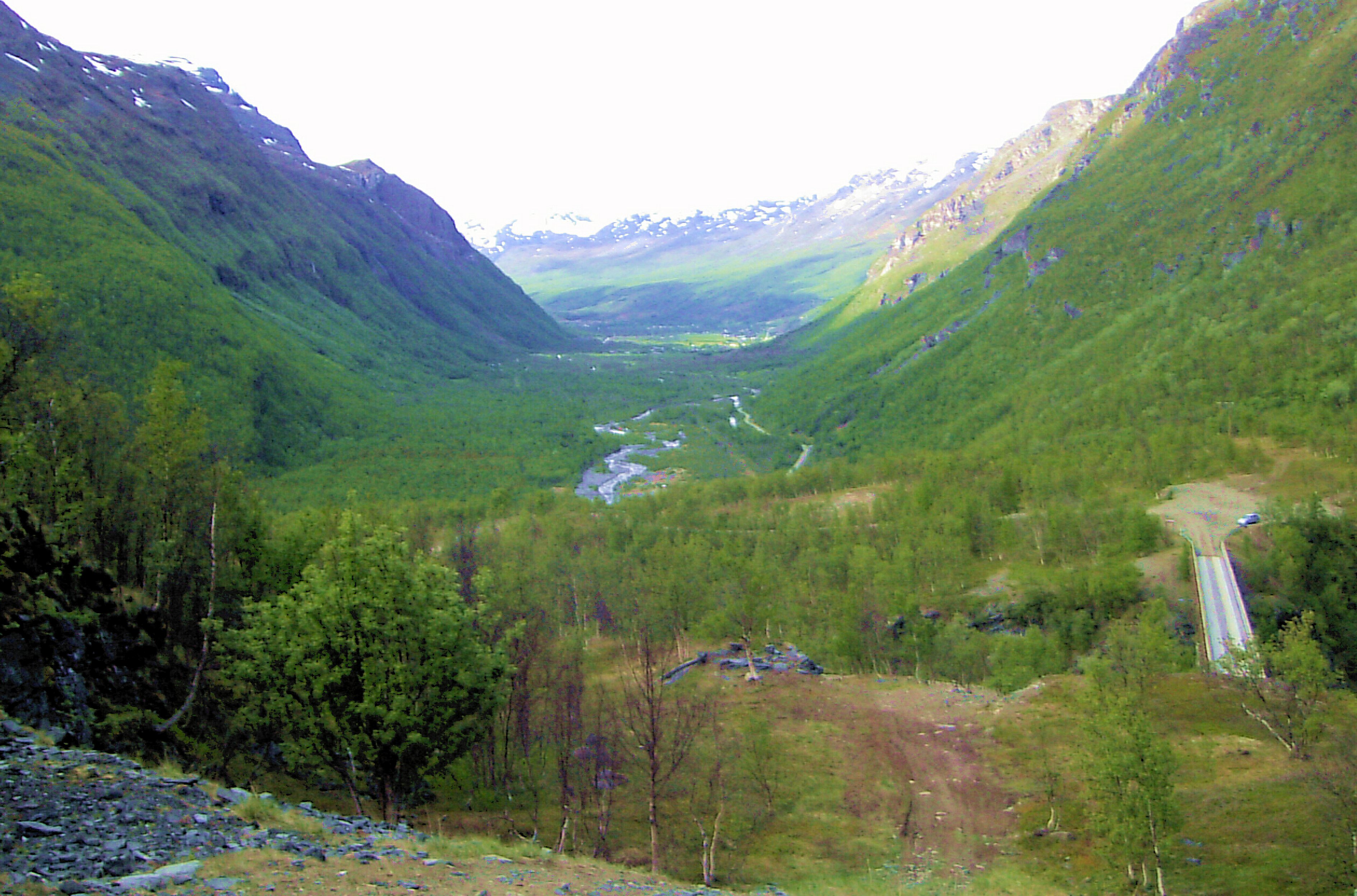
Kåfjord valley (Kåfjorddalen).

The municipality is situated on the eastern side of the Lyngen fjord, and around its eastern arm, the Kåfjord. The municipal centre is Olderdalen. Other villages include Birtavarre, Kåfjorddalen, Djupvik, Nordmannvik, and Manndalen, where the international indigenous peoples' festival Riddu Riđđu is hosted each year.

On the border with Finland, is the mountain Ráisduattarháldi which has a height of 1,365 m (4,478 ft). The highest point in the municipality is the 1,375.4-metre (4,512 ft) tall mountain Isfjellet.

== Economy ==
Fishing and small-scale farming have been the most important sources of income. Now many people work in education and other public services. The population has declined for many years, but the decline is now less rapid than earlier.

== Population ==
The majority of the population is of Sami origin. Due to assimilation pressure from the Norwegian State, the language was largely lost in the 20th century. Efforts are being made to reintroduce the Northern Sami language which is largely concentrated in the municipality's largest village, Manndalen/Olmmáivággi.

== Notable people ==
- Erik Johnsen, (Norwegian Wiki) (1844 in Kåfjord i Lyngen – 1941), a Laestadian preacher who received the King's Medal of Merit (Kongens Fortjenstmedalje) in 1938 for his work for the salvation of the soul.
- Rolf Ketil Bjørn (1938 in Kåfjord – 2008), a businessperson and politician
- Jan Lindvall (born 1950 in Kåfjord), a retired cross-country skier who competed at the 1984 Winter Olympics

== Gallery ==
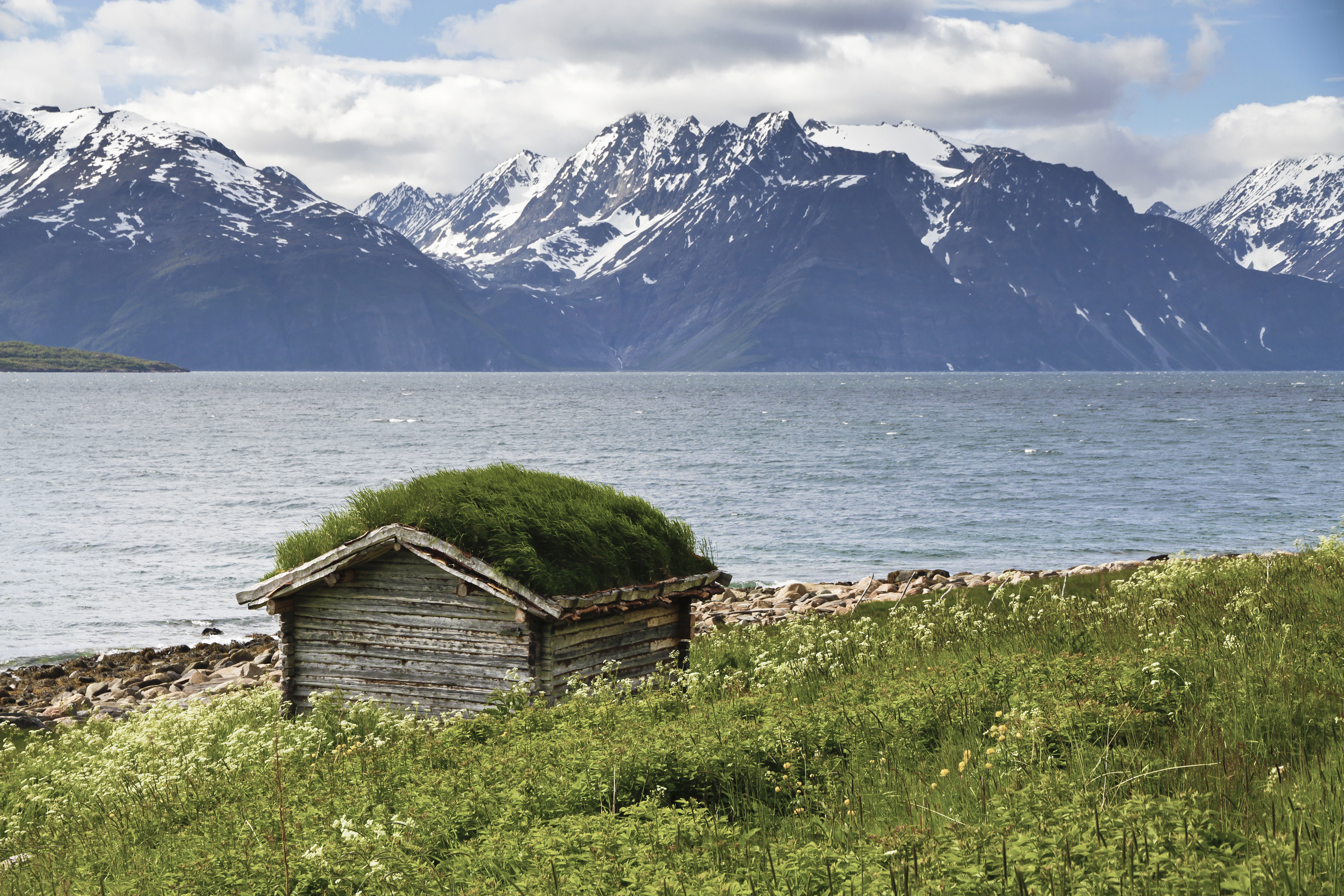
Shed with green roof at Lyngen fjord

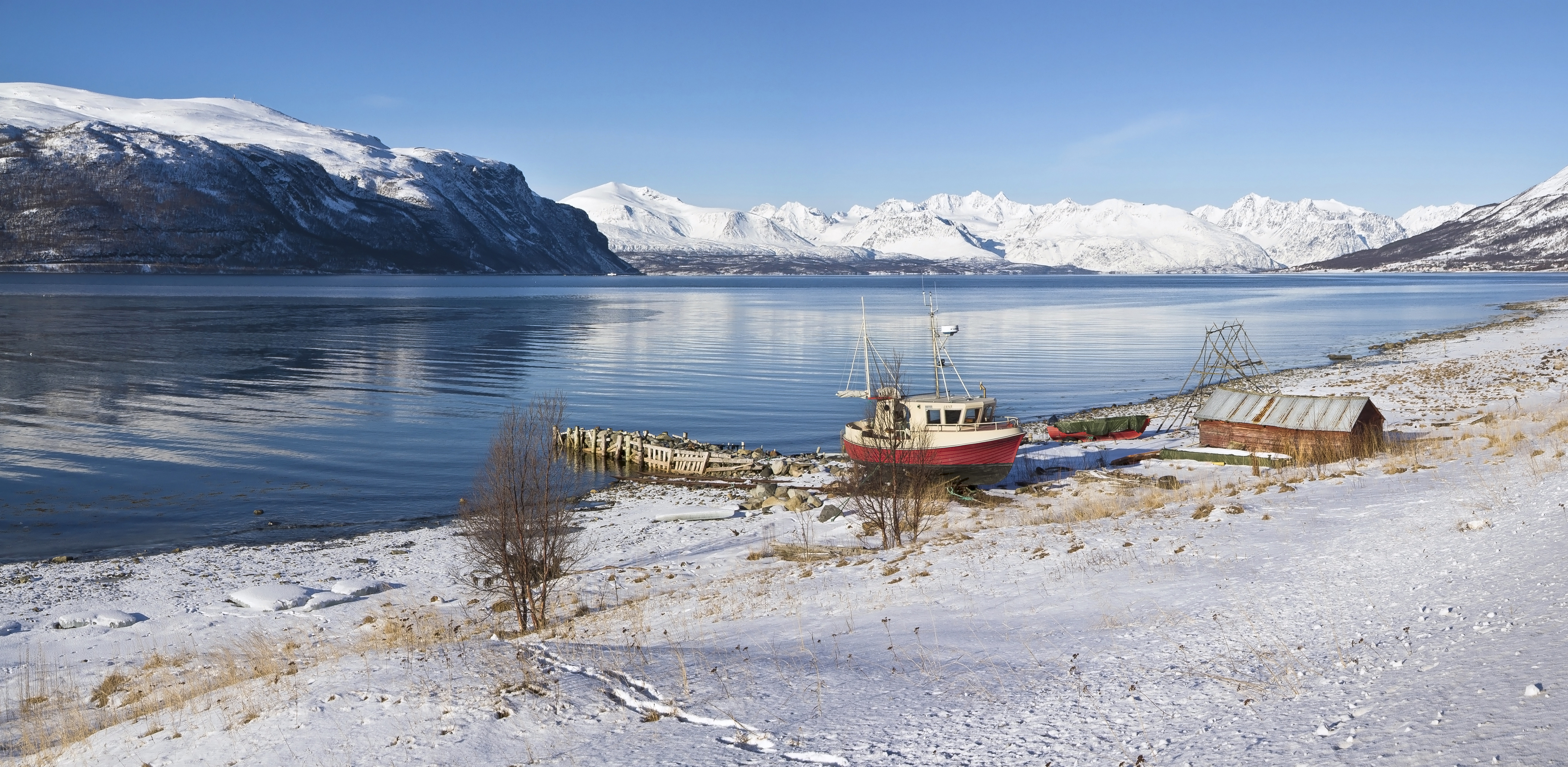
A view from the northeast coast of Kåfjorden

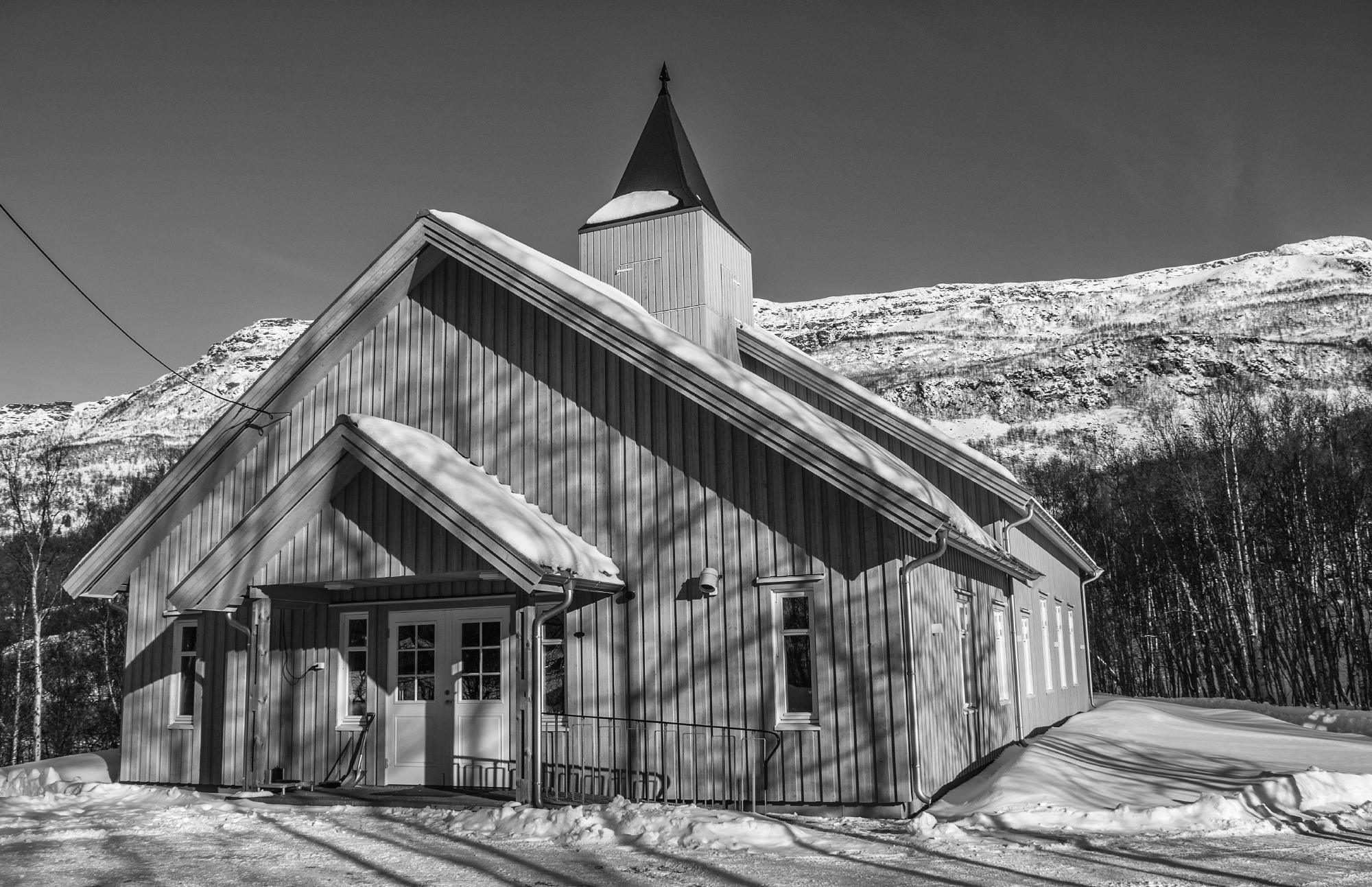
Fossheim
