= European route E69 =

Road in trans-European E-road network

Coordinates: 71°10′04″N 25°46′54″E

E69

Route information
- Length: 111 km (69 mi)

Major junctions
- North end: North Cape
- South end: Olderfjord

Location
- Countries: Norway

Highway system
- International E-road network; A Class; B Class

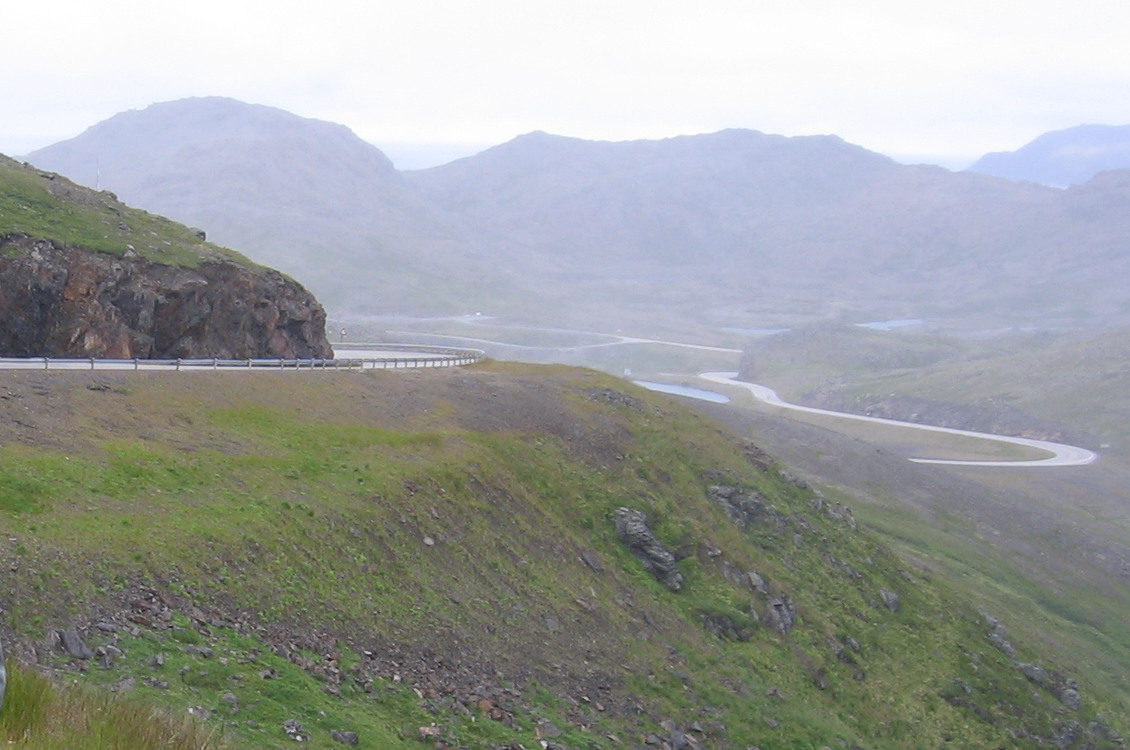
The E 69 road at Magerøya

European route E69 is an E-road between Olderfjord and North Cape in northern Norway. The road is 129 km (80 mi) long. It contains five tunnels, totalling 15.5 km (9.6 mi). The longest, the North Cape Tunnel, is 6.9 km (4.3 mi) long and reaches 212 m (696 ft) below sea level.

During the winter months the northernmost part of the road (Skarsvåg-North Cape) is available only to convoys, driving at fixed times, if weather permits.

E69 is the northernmost road in the world with connections to a major international road network. Roads further north in locations including Svalbard and Greenland are isolated and short.

== History ==
=== Route numbering ===
In the first version of the current E-road network established in 1975, E69 was a longer and completely different road from Warsaw to Wiener Neustadt through Piotrków, Katowice, Český Těšín, Žilina, Trenčín, Piešťany and Bratislava. This route is now mostly part of E75, and in that time, the E75 went through Kraków and Banská Bystrica, which is now part of E77. It was later modified south from Mattersburg. Instead of Wiener Neustadt, it went further to the south, touching Oberpullendorf and Oberwart following the Austrian route 50, ending in E66. This version was never signposted along roads, instead a modified version was implemented with E75 on this route. In the old version E-road network established in 1950, E69 went between Ålesund and Dombås in Norway, now E136.

The road to North Cape was in 1975 planned as road E45, later E47, going Lübeck-Helsingborg-Oslo-Trondheim-Olderfjord-North Cape. Norway and Sweden wanted to keep the old number E6 to most of this road and got that after some years of negotiation. In 1992, E69 was given its current route. Before that, the road was number 95 in Norway. Since then, it has no distinct national number.

=== Construction history ===
The road Olderfjord–Honningsvåg was planned in the 1930s, particularly after a public meeting in Honningsvåg in 1934, as a means of drawing tourism to offset the loss of lucrative fishing rights, shortly after the area got the first road connection with Southern Norway. A ferry line was set up between Russenes near Olderfjord and Honningsvåg, a distance of around 70 kilometres (43 mi; 38 nmi). The road between Honningsvåg and North Cape was opened in 1956. In 1968, the road was extended to a new ferry site at Kåfjord, and the ferry to Honningsvåg was shortened to 15 kilometres (9.3 mi; 8.1 nmi).

The North Cape Tunnel and the Honningsvåg Tunnel were opened in 1999, thereby eliminating the ferry. From then to 29 June 2012, the North Cape Tunnel and adjacent tunnels were tolled.

The Skarvberg tunnel near the southern end of E69 opened in 1968 and was a bottleneck. It was partly only 4.7 metres (15 ft) wide, so wide vehicles cannot use it at the same time in opposite directions, and there is rockslide danger in the area. However, a new tunnel was being built in 2019–2022 and opened in March 2023, shortening the route by 2 km.
