= Olderfjord =

Olderfjord (Norwegian) Leaibevuotna (Northern Sami) Leipovuono (Kven)
- Village
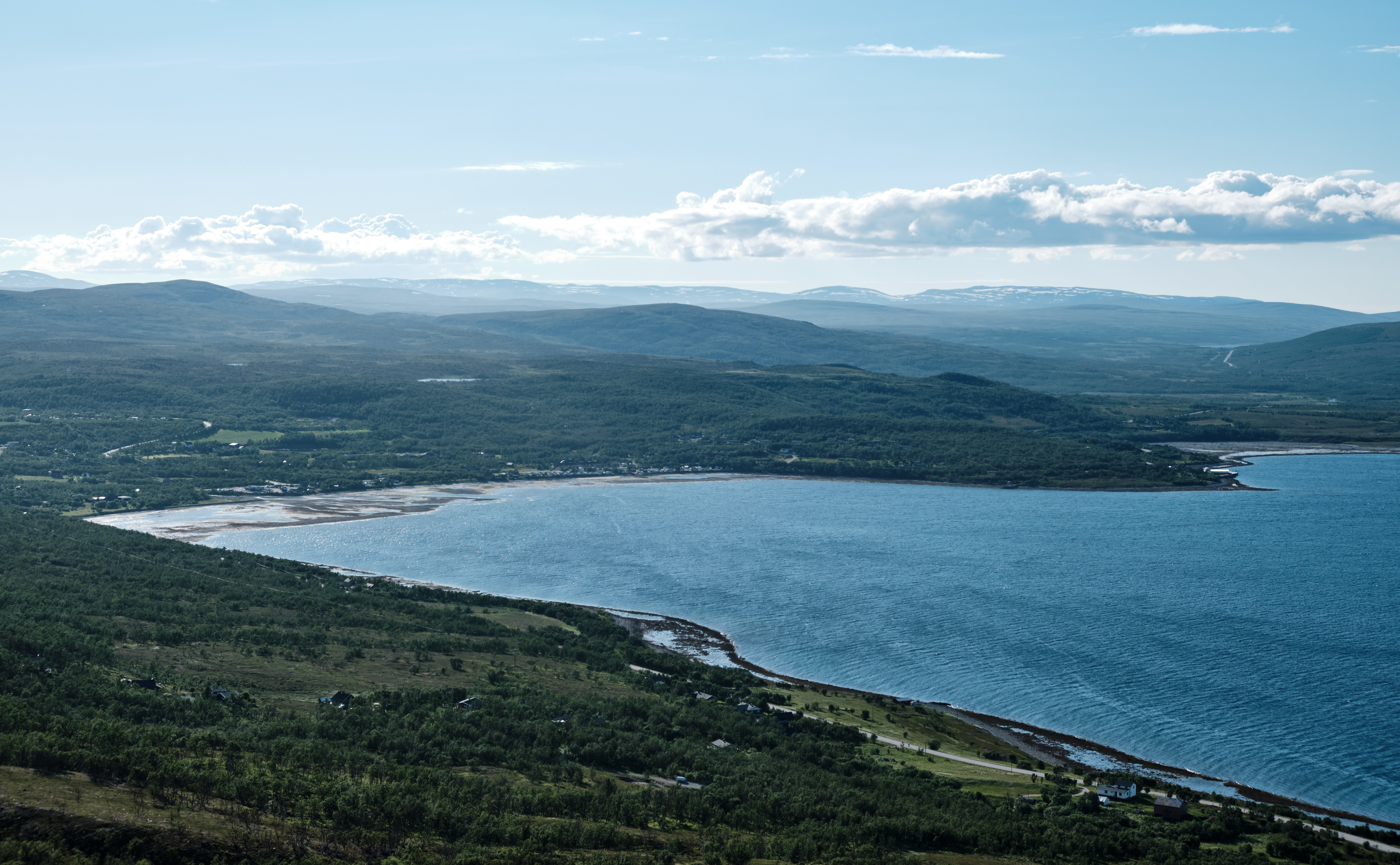
- Olderfjord in Porsanger
- Interactive map of Olderfjord (Norwegian); Leaibevuotna (Northern Sami); Leipovuono (Kven)
- Location within Finnmark Location within Norway
- Coordinates: 70°28′25″N 25°04′16″E
- Country: Norway
- Region: Northern Norway
- County: Finnmark
- District: Vest-Finnmark
- Municipality: Porsanger
- Elevation: 5 m (16 ft)
- Time zone: UTC+01:00 (CET)
  - Summer (DST): UTC+02:00 (CEST)
- Post Code: 9713 Russenes

Olderfjord (Norwegian), Leaibevuotna (Northern Sami), or Leipovuono (Kven) is a village in Porsanger Municipality in Finnmark county, Norway. The village lies at the end of Olderfjorden on the eastern coast of the Porsanger Peninsula, along the shore of the Porsangerfjorden.

The village sits at the junction of the European route E6 and European route E69 highways, about 10 kilometres (6.2 mi) northwest of the smaller village of Kistrand, where the historic Kistrand Church is located. In terms of its longitude, Olderfjord is located further east than any location in Sweden and just east of Helsinki. Being well above 70°N, there is a prolonged midnight sun and polar night in the village.

The village hosts a tourist centre with hotel rooms and apartments, a camping site and a cafeteria.
