= Porsanger Municipality =

Municipality in Finnmark, Norway

Porsanger Municipality Porsanger kommune Porsáŋggu gielda Porsangin komuuni
- Municipality
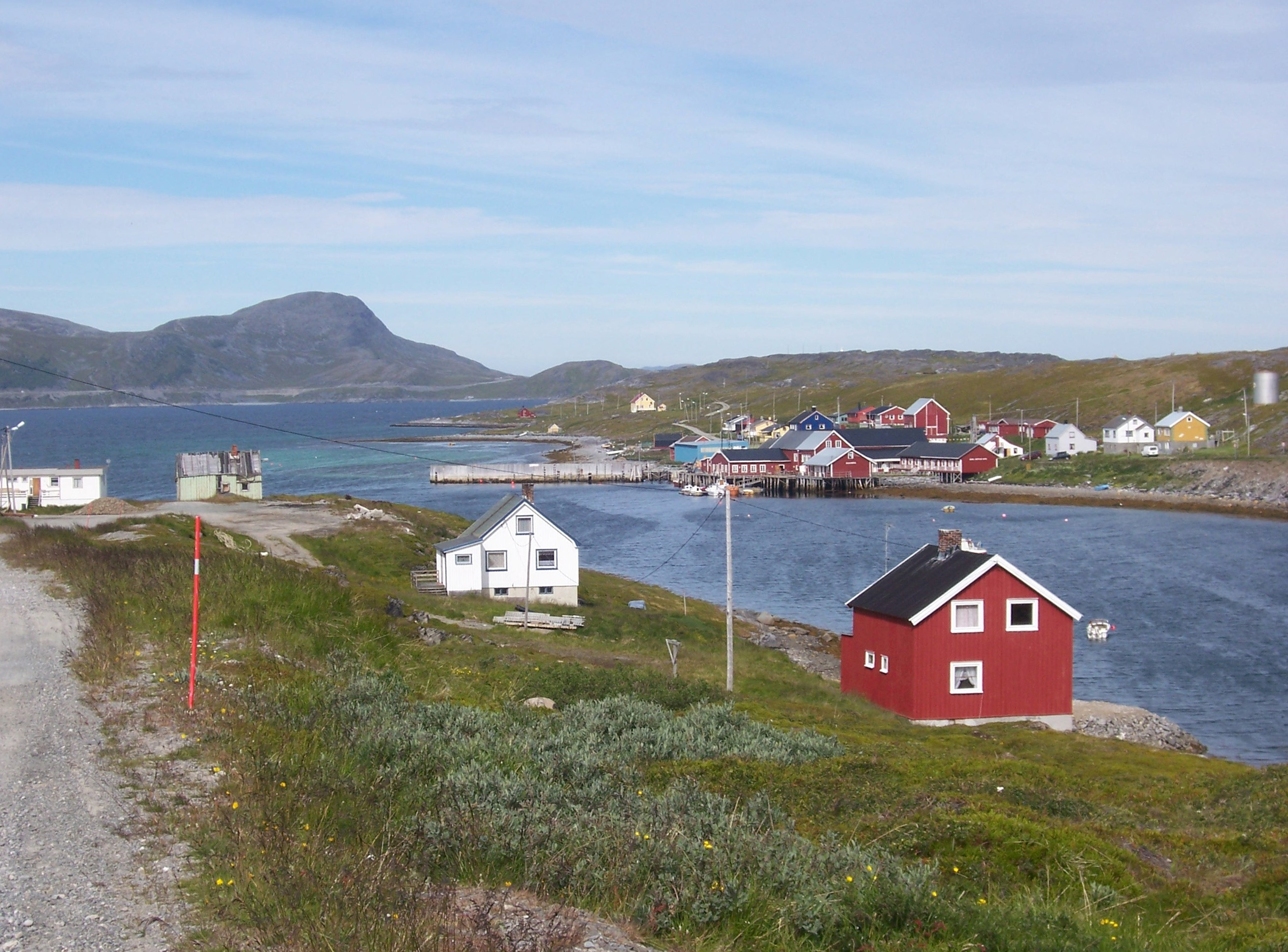
- View of Repvåg

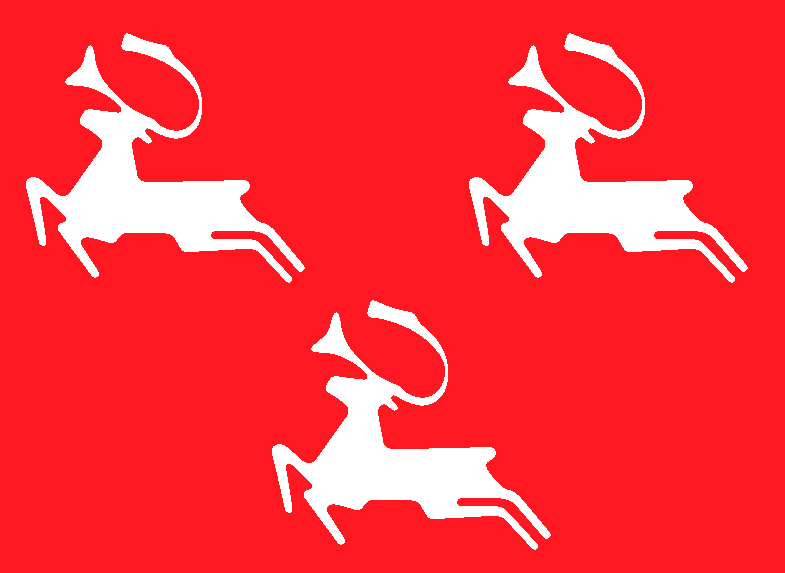
- Flag Coat of arms

- Finnmark within Norway

- Porsanger within Finnmark
- Coordinates: 70°03′08″N 24°57′21″E
- Country: Norway
- County: Finnmark
- District: Vest-Finnmark
- Established: 1 Jan 1838
- Administrative centre: Lakselv

Government
  - Mayor (2023): Jo Inge Hesjevik (H)

Area
  - Total: 4,874.29 km^{2} (1,881.97 sq mi)
  - Land: 4,640.92 km^{2} (1,791.87 sq mi)
  - Water: 233.37 km^{2} (90.10 sq mi) 4.8%
  - Rank: #3 in Norway
- Highest elevation: 1,138.9 m (3,737 ft)

Population (2024)
  - Total: 3,889
  - Rank: #208 in Norway
  - Density: 0.8/km^{2} (2.1/sq mi)
  - Change (10 years): ▼ −1.9%
- Demonym(s): Porsangværing; Porsangerværing

Official languages
  - Norwegian form: Bokmål
  - Sámi form: Northern Sami
  - Other language: Kven
- Time zone: UTC+01:00 (CET)
  - Summer (DST): UTC+02:00 (CEST)
- ISO 3166 code: NO-5622
- Website: Official website

Porsanger (Northern Sami: Porsáŋgu; Kven: Porsanki) is a municipality in Finnmark county, Norway. The administrative centre of the municipality is the village of Lakselv. Other villages in the municipality include Børselv, Brenna, Indre Billefjord, Kistrand, Olderfjord, and Skoganvarre.

The 4,874-square-kilometre (1,882 sq mi) municipality is the 3rd largest by area out of the 357 municipalities in Norway. Porsanger is the 208th most populous municipality in Norway with a population of 3,889 (many of whom have a Kven (Kainu) or Sami background). The municipality's population density is 0.8 inhabitants per square kilometre (2.1/sq mi) and its population has decreased by 1.9% over the previous 10-year period.

== General information ==
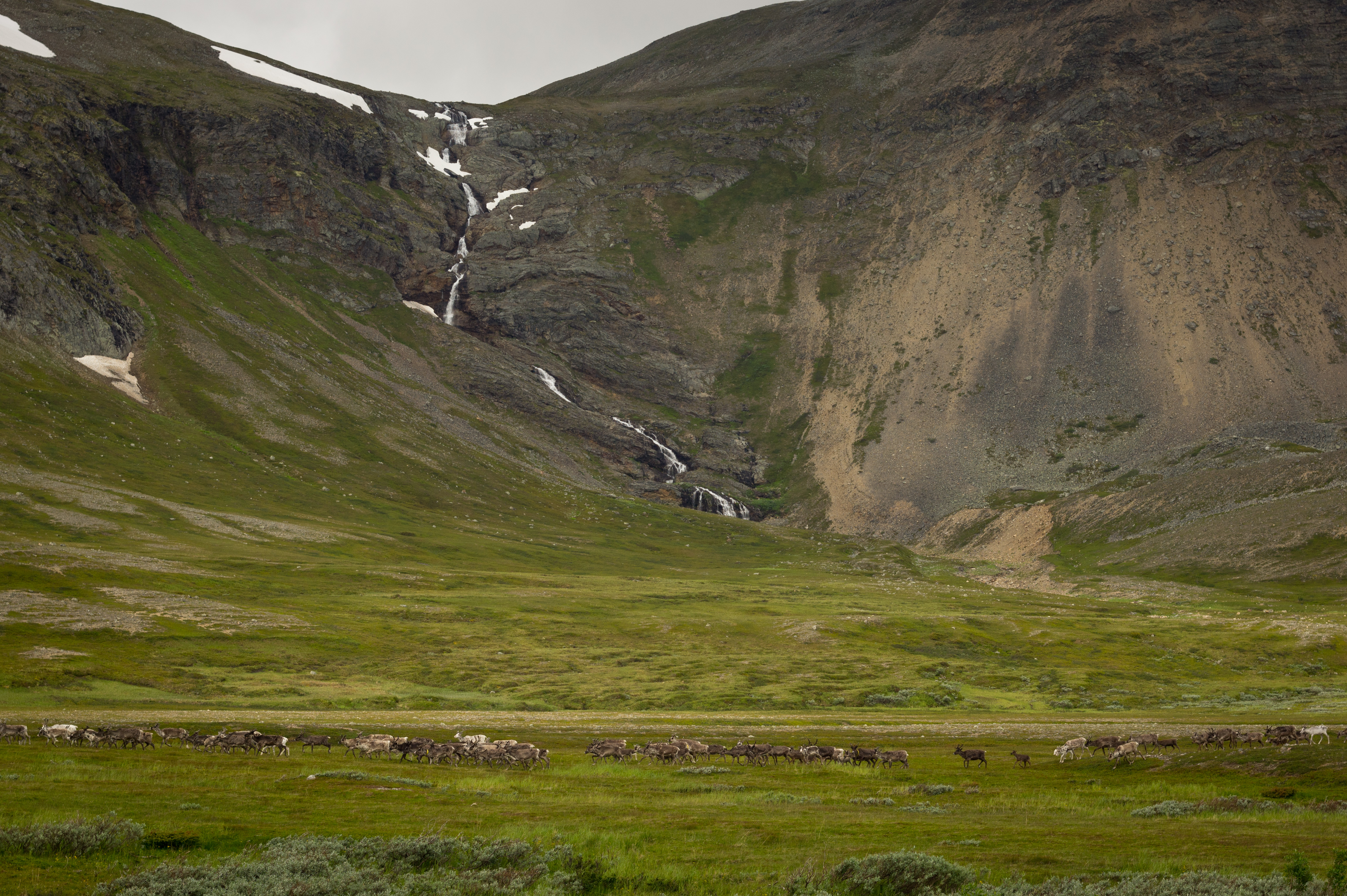
View of a reindeer herd near a waterfall in Porsanger

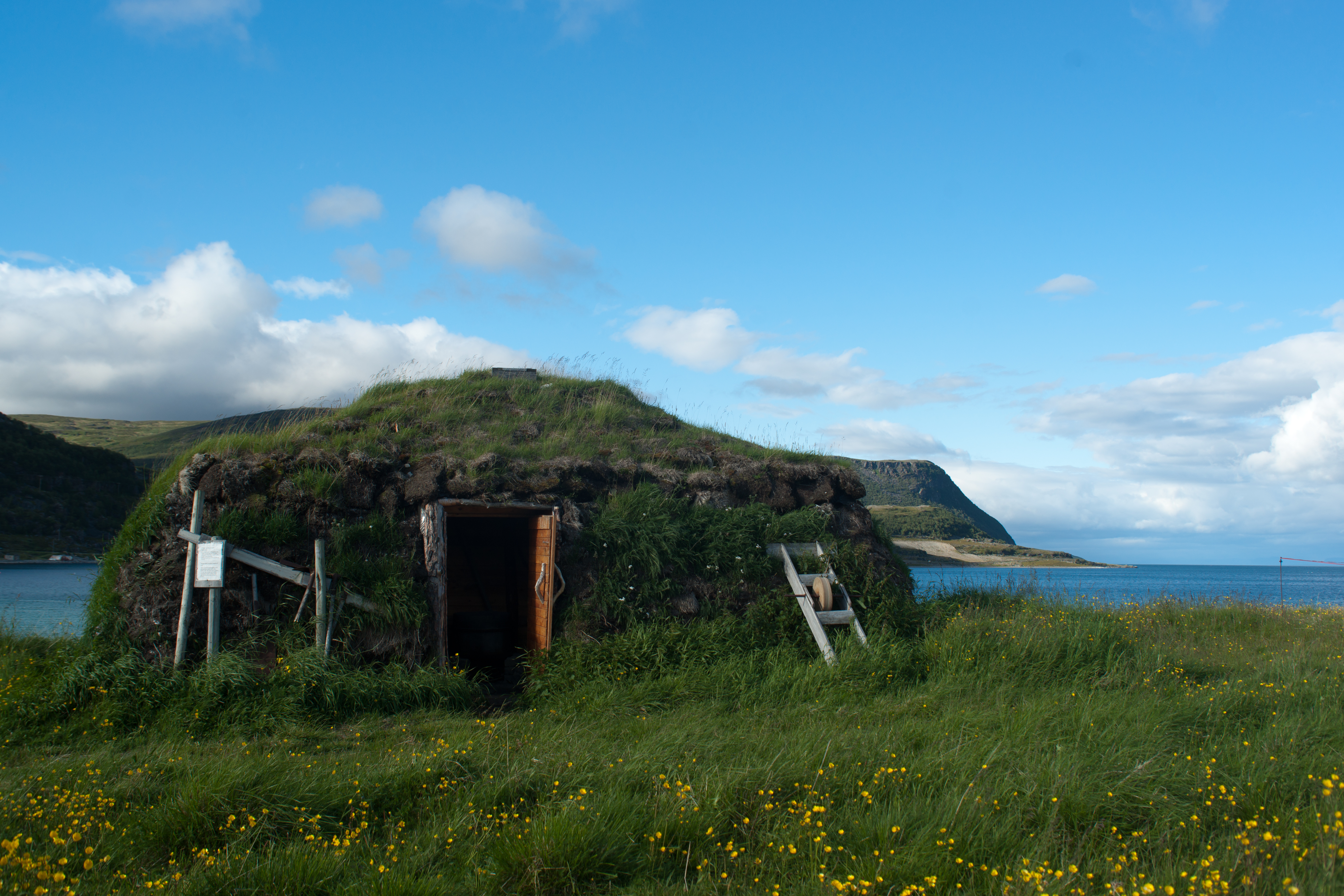
Traditional Sami house, along the fjord

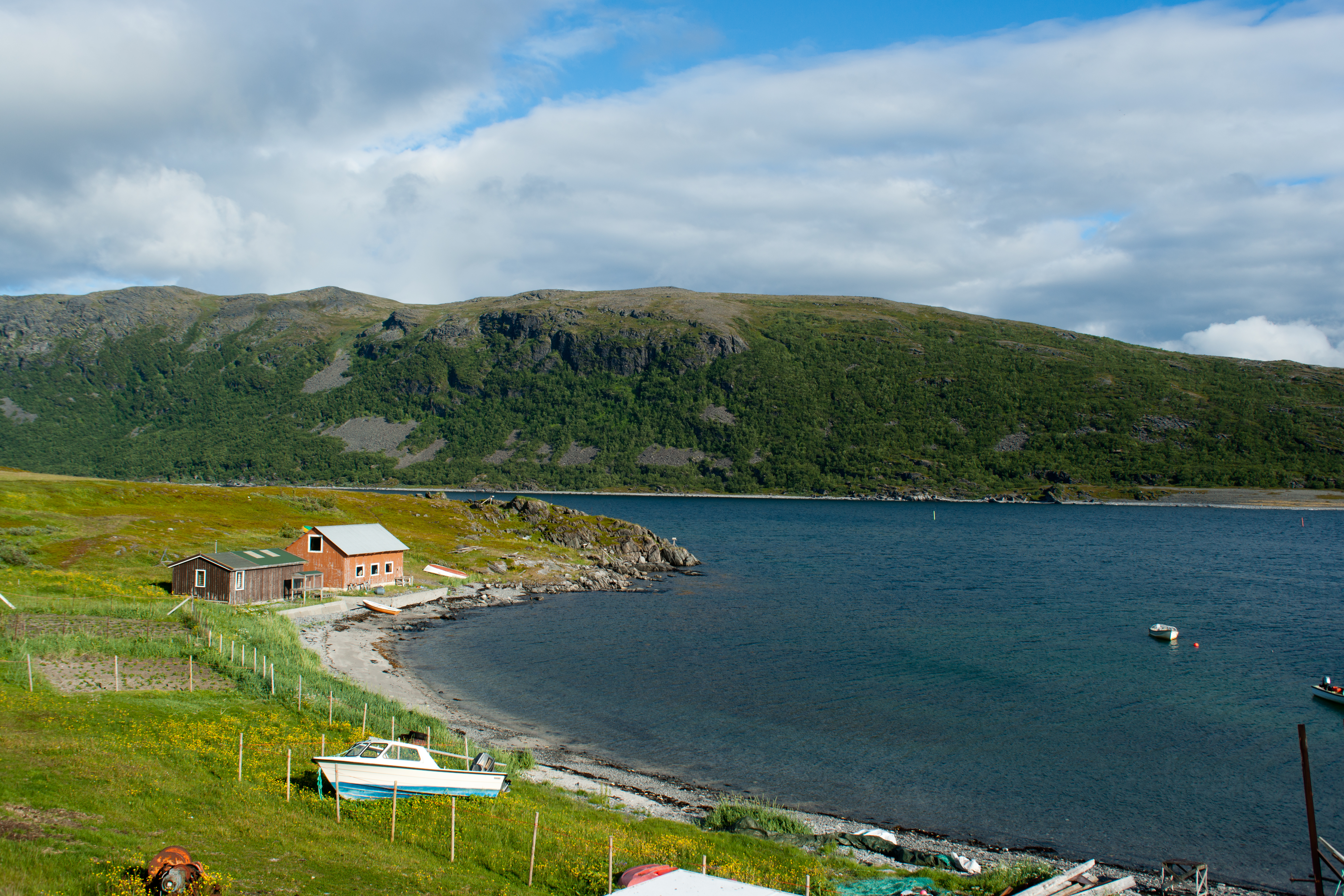
Kistrand in Porsanger on the western shore of Porsanger fjord

The municipality of Kistrand (renamed Porsanger in 1964) was established on 1 January 1838 (see formannskapsdistrikt law). On 1 January 1851, the southern part of Kistrand (population: 869) was separated to become the new Kautokeino Municipality. On 1 January 1861, the northern part of Kistrand (population: 345) was separated to become the new Kjelvik Municipality. On 1 January 1866, the southern part of Kistrand (population: 515) was separated to become the new Karasjok Municipality.

On 1 January 2020, the municipality became part of the newly formed Troms og Finnmark county. Previously, it had been part of the old Finnmark county. On 1 January 2024, the Troms og Finnmark county was divided and the municipality once again became part of Finnmark county.

=== Name ===
The municipality (originally the parish) was first named after the old Kistrand farm since the first Kistrand Church was built there. The first element is possibly derived from the word kid which means "kid" (as in a young goat). The last element is strand which means "beach" or "shore".

On 2 November 1962, a royal resolution changed the name of the municipality to Porsanger. The new name comes the local Porsangerfjorden (Old Norse: Porsangr). The first element is probably the name of the plant pors or finnmarkspors (Rhododendron tomentosum). Another theory is that the first element is derived from the Northern Sami word borsi which means "waterfall". The last element is angr which means "fjord" or "bay".

Since 2004, the municipality has had three co-official, co-equal, interchangeable names: Porsanger (Norwegian), Porsáŋgu (Northern Sami), and Porsanki (Kven), since it has three official languages: Norwegian, Northern Sami, and Kven. The spelling of the Sami and Kven language names change depending on how they are used. In Sami, it is called Porsáŋgu when it is spelled alone, but it is Porsáŋggu gielda when using the Sami language equivalent to "Porsanger Municipality". In Kven, it is called Porsanki when it is spelled alone, and it is Porsangin komuuni when using the Kven language equivalent to "Porsanger municipality".

=== Coat of arms ===
The coat of arms was granted on 16 June 1967. The official blazon is "Gules, three reindeer salient argent" (Norwegian: På rød bunn tre springende hvite rein). This means the arms have a red field (background) and the charge is three leaping reindeer, two over one. The reindeer have a tincture of argent which means it is commonly colored white, but if it is made out of metal, then silver is used. Porsanger is one of the largest municipalities in the Northern Norway that is not dependent on fishing. Instead, the local people historically farmed reindeer, which is still an importance source of income for the residents. The arms were designed by Hallvard Trætteberg.

=== Churches ===
The Church of Norway has one parish (sokn) within Porsanger Municipality. It is part of the Indre Finnmark prosti (deanery) in the Diocese of Nord-Hålogaland.

Churches in Porsanger Municipality
Parish (sokn)	Church name	Location of the church	Year built
Porsanger	Brenna Chapel	Brenna	1971
Porsanger	Børselv Church	Børselv	1958
Porsanger	Kistrand Church	Kistrand	1856
Porsanger	Lakselv Church	Lakselv	1963
Porsanger	Skoganvarre Chapel	Skoganvarre	1963

== History ==
The area has been settled by Norwegians and Sami people since time immemorial. In the 18th century, people from Finland, escaping famine and war, settled along the Porsangerfjorden. These people are today known as Kven.

== Government ==
Porsanger Municipality is responsible for primary education (through 10th grade), outpatient health services, senior citizen services, welfare and other social services, zoning, economic development, and municipal roads and utilities. The municipality is governed by a municipal council of directly elected representatives. The mayor is indirectly elected by a vote of the municipal council. The municipality is under the jurisdiction of the Indre og Østre Finnmark District Court and the Hålogaland Court of Appeal.

=== Municipal council ===
The municipal council (Kommunestyre) of Porsanger Municipality is made up of 19 representatives that are elected to four year terms. The tables below show the current and historical composition of the council by political party.

Porsanger kommunestyre 2023–2027
Party name (in Norwegian)	Number of representatives
Labour Party (Arbeiderpartiet)	3
Progress Party (Fremskrittspartiet)	3
Conservative Party (Høyre)	6
Centre Party (Senterpartiet)	1
Socialist Left Party (Sosialistisk Venstreparti)	1
Cross-Party List for Porsanger TLP (Tverrpolitisk liste i Porsanger TLP)	5
Total number of members:	19

Porsanger kommunestyre 2019–2023
Party name (in Norwegian)	Number of representatives
Labour Party (Arbeiderpartiet)	5
Progress Party (Fremskrittspartiet)	1
Conservative Party (Høyre)	5
Centre Party (Senterpartiet)	3
Socialist Left Party (Sosialistisk Venstreparti)	2
Cross-Party List in Porsanger (Tverrpolitisk liste i Porsanger)	3
Total number of members:	19

Porsanger kommunestyre 2015–2019
Party name (in Norwegian)	Number of representatives
Labour Party (Arbeiderpartiet)	6
Progress Party (Fremskrittspartiet)	1
Conservative Party (Høyre)	7
Centre Party (Senterpartiet)	1
Socialist Left Party (Sosialistisk Venstreparti)	1
Cross-Party List in Porsanger (Tverrpolitisk liste i Porsanger)	3
Total number of members:	19

Porsanger kommunestyre 2011–2015
Party name (in Norwegian)	Number of representatives
Labour Party (Arbeiderpartiet)	7
Progress Party (Fremskrittspartiet)	3
Conservative Party (Høyre)	7
Centre Party (Senterpartiet)	1
Socialist Left Party (Sosialistisk Venstreparti)	1
Total number of members:	19

Porsanger kommunestyre 2007–2011
Party name (in Norwegian)	Number of representatives
Labour Party (Arbeiderpartiet)	7
Progress Party (Fremskrittspartiet)	5
Conservative Party (Høyre)	4
Centre Party (Senterpartiet)	2
Socialist Left Party (Sosialistisk Venstreparti)	1
Total number of members:	19

Porsanger kommunestyre 2003–2007
Party name (in Norwegian)	Number of representatives
Labour Party (Arbeiderpartiet)	6
Progress Party (Fremskrittspartiet)	2
Conservative Party (Høyre)	7
Centre Party (Senterpartiet)	2
Socialist Left Party (Sosialistisk Venstreparti)	2
Total number of members:	19

Porsanger kommunestyre 1999–2003
Party name (in Norwegian)	Number of representatives
Labour Party (Arbeiderpartiet)	7
Progress Party (Fremskrittspartiet)	2
Conservative Party (Høyre)	8
Christian Democratic Party (Kristelig Folkeparti)	1
Centre Party (Senterpartiet)	4
Socialist Left Party (Sosialistisk Venstreparti)	2
Porsanger List (Porsangerlista)	1
Total number of members:	25

Porsanger kommunestyre 1995–1999
Party name (in Norwegian)	Number of representatives
Labour Party (Arbeiderpartiet)	8
Conservative Party (Høyre)	4
Christian Democratic Party (Kristelig Folkeparti)	1
Centre Party (Senterpartiet)	4
Socialist Left Party (Sosialistisk Venstreparti)	3
Liberal Party (Venstre)	1
Porsanger List (Porsangerlista)	4
Total number of members:	25

Porsanger kommunestyre 1991–1995
Party name (in Norwegian)	Number of representatives
Labour Party (Arbeiderpartiet)	10
Conservative Party (Høyre)	6
Christian Democratic Party (Kristelig Folkeparti)	1
Socialist Left Party (Sosialistisk Venstreparti)	4
Liberal Party (Venstre)	1
Porsanger List (Porsangerlista)	3
Total number of members:	25

Porsanger kommunestyre 1987–1991
Party name (in Norwegian)	Number of representatives
Labour Party (Arbeiderpartiet)	13
Progress Party (Fremskrittspartiet)	3
Conservative Party (Høyre)	5
Christian Democratic Party (Kristelig Folkeparti)	1
Socialist Left Party (Sosialistisk Venstreparti)	1
Porsanger Cross-Party List (Porsanger tverrpolitiske liste)	2
Total number of members:	25

Porsanger kommunestyre 1983–1987
Party name (in Norwegian)	Number of representatives
Labour Party (Arbeiderpartiet)	14
Progress Party (Fremskrittspartiet)	1
Conservative Party (Høyre)	4
Christian Democratic Party (Kristelig Folkeparti)	1
Socialist Left Party (Sosialistisk Venstreparti)	1
Local list for Indre Porsanger (Kretslista for Indre Porsanger)	3
Porsanger Local List (Porsanger Bygdefolkets liste)	1
Total number of members:	25

Porsanger kommunestyre 1979–1983
Party name (in Norwegian)	Number of representatives
Labour Party (Arbeiderpartiet)	10
Conservative Party (Høyre)	5
Christian Democratic Party (Kristelig Folkeparti)	1
Centre Party (Senterpartiet)	1
Local list for Indre Porsanger (Kretslista for Indre Porsanger)	6
Common List for Porsanger (Samlingsliste for Porsanger)	1
Socialist Unity Liste (Sosialistisk enhetslist)	1
Total number of members:	25

Porsanger kommunestyre 1975–1979
Party name (in Norwegian)	Number of representatives
Labour Party (Arbeiderpartiet)	11
Conservative Party (Høyre)	4
Christian Democratic Party (Kristelig Folkeparti)	2
Centre Party (Senterpartiet)	2
Socialist Left Party (Sosialistisk Venstreparti)	1
Local List(s) (Lokale lister)	5
Total number of members:	25

Porsanger kommunestyre 1971–1975
Party name (in Norwegian)	Number of representatives
Labour Party (Arbeiderpartiet)	20
Conservative Party (Høyre)	3
Centre Party (Senterpartiet)	2
Total number of members:	25

Porsanger kommunestyre 1967–1971
Party name (in Norwegian)	Number of representatives
Labour Party (Arbeiderpartiet)	15
Conservative Party (Høyre)	3
Local List(s) (Lokale lister)	1
Total number of members:	19

Porsanger kommunestyre 1963–1967
Party name (in Norwegian)	Number of representatives
Labour Party (Arbeiderpartiet)	15
Conservative Party (Høyre)	3
Socialist People's Party (Sosialistisk Folkeparti)	1
Total number of members:	19

Kistrand herredsstyre 1959–1963
Party name (in Norwegian)	Number of representatives
Labour Party (Arbeiderpartiet)	11
Conservative Party (Høyre)	3
Communist Party (Kommunistiske Parti)	1
List of workers, fishermen, and small farmholders (Arbeidere, fiskere, småbrukere liste)	2
Local List(s) (Lokale lister)	2
Total number of members:	19

Kistrand herredsstyre 1955–1959
Party name (in Norwegian)	Number of representatives
Labour Party (Arbeiderpartiet)	10
Conservative Party (Høyre)	2
Communist Party (Kommunistiske Parti)	2
List of workers, fishermen, and small farmholders (Arbeidere, fiskere, småbrukere liste)	1
Local List(s) (Lokale lister)	4
Total number of members:	19

Kistrand herredsstyre 1951–1955
Party name (in Norwegian)	Number of representatives
Labour Party (Arbeiderpartiet)	8
Communist Party (Kommunistiske Parti)	1
Local List(s) (Lokale lister)	7
Total number of members:	16

Kistrand herredsstyre 1947–1951
Party name (in Norwegian)	Number of representatives
Labour Party (Arbeiderpartiet)	9
Communist Party (Kommunistiske Parti)	2
List of workers, fishermen, and small farmholders (Arbeidere, fiskere, småbrukere liste)	3
Local List(s) (Lokale lister)	2
Total number of members:	16

Kistrand herredsstyre 1945–1947
Party name (in Norwegian)	Number of representatives
Labour Party (Arbeiderpartiet)	8
List of workers, fishermen, and small farmholders (Arbeidere, fiskere, småbrukere liste)	1
Local List(s) (Lokale lister)	7
Total number of members:	16

Kistrand herredsstyre 1937–1941*
Party name (in Norwegian)	Number of representatives
Labour Party (Arbeiderpartiet)	9
Joint List(s) of Non-Socialist Parties (Borgerlige Felleslister)	3
Local List(s) (Lokale lister)	4
Total number of members:	16
Note: Due to the German occupation of Norway during World War II, no elections were held for new municipal councils until after the war ended in 1945.

=== Mayors ===
The mayor (Norwegian: ordfører) of Porsanger Municipality is the political leader of the municipality and the chairperson of the municipal council. Here is a list of people who have held this position:

- 1839–1841: Søren Von Krogh Zetlitz
- 1841–1847: Johan Eirik Greiner
- 1847–1849: Peder K. Ulich
- 1849–1857: Johan Eirik Greiner
- 1857–1861: Peter Valeur
- 1861–1865: Johan Eirik Greiner
- 1869–1873: Lorents Jacob Pauli Holmgren
- 1873–1876: Lars Anton Moe
- 1877–1879: Thorvald Egeberg
- 1879–1881: Johan Eirik Greiner
- 1881–1885: Peder Larsen
- 1885–1894: Jacob A. Nordang
- 1894–1895: Anton Bye
- 1896–1897: Karl J Smith
- 1898–1901: Anton Bye
- 1902–1904: Salomon Nilsen
- 1905–1907: Nils Christoffersen
- 1908–1909: Peder Sætrum
- 1909–1911: Johannes Rasmussen
- 1911–1913: Anton Bye
- 1914–1917: Peder Andreas Olsen
- 1917–1919: H. Wilhelmsen
- 1920–1922: Peder Andreas Olsen
- 1923–1925: Georg Bjørkli
- 1926–1931: Olaf Reiersen
- 1932–1941: Peder Sivertsen (Ap)
- 1945–1945: Hans A. Opstad (Ap)
- 1945–1951: Peder Sivertsen (Ap)
- 1952–1967: Hans A. Opstad (Ap)
- 1968–1975: Helmer Mikkelsen (Ap)
- 1976–1983: Hans A. Karlsen (LL)
- 1984–1987: Steinulf Isaksen (Ap)
- 1988–1989: Aina Hanssen (Ap)
- 1990–1991: Berit Oppegaard (H)
- 1992–1995: Åsla Eriksen (Ap)
- 1995–1999: Rolf I. Johansen (Ap)
- 1999–2007: Bjørn Søderholm (H)
- 2007–2011: Mona Skanke (Ap)
- 2011–2015: Knut Roger Hanssen (H)
- 2015–2023: Aina Borch (Ap)
- 2023–present: Jo Inge Hesjevik (H)

== Economy ==
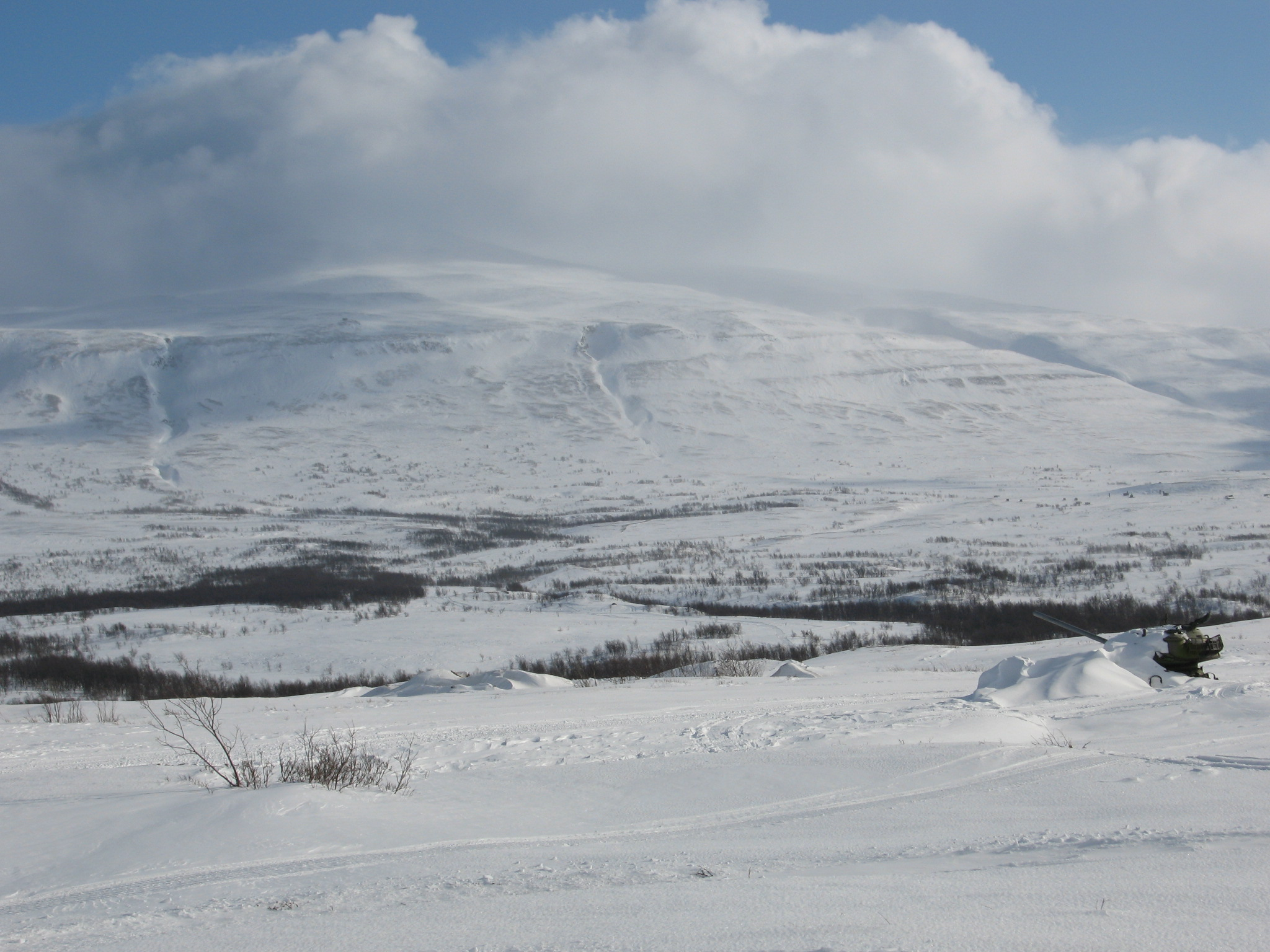
Halkavarre firing range

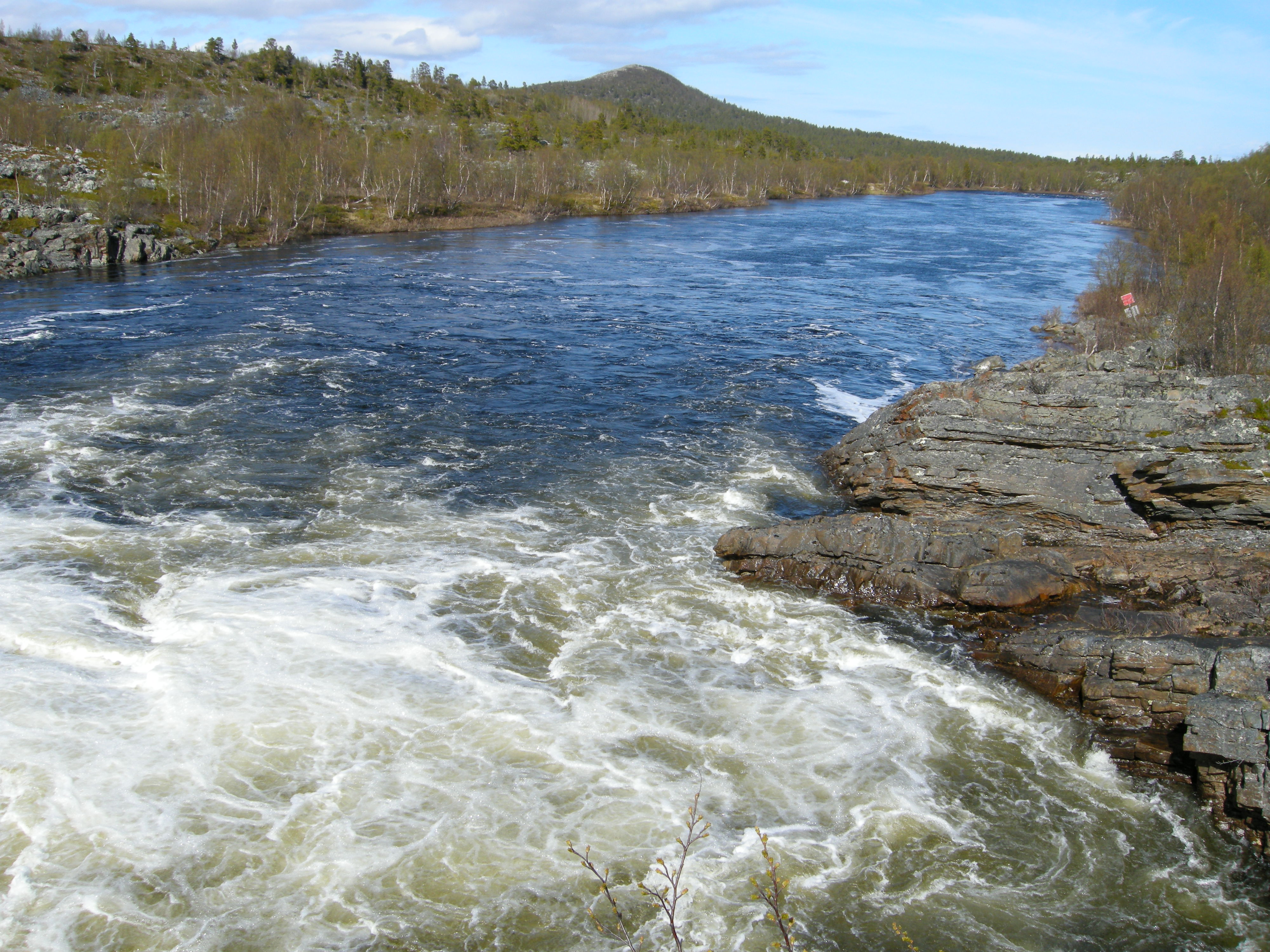
River in Stabbursdalen, where the world's northernmost pine forest grow

Lakselv Airport, Banak is located on the Banak peninsula, just north of Lakselv village, along the coast of the fjord. The airport has connections to Tromsø and Kirkenes and it is operated by Widerøe. There are also charter flights in the summer season. The airport is also used by the Royal Norwegian Air Force's Station Group Banak. The Norwegian Army also has a garrison at Porsangermoen (Garrison of Porsanger), and so the military presence in Porsanger is quite heavy.

The local newspapers are Finnmark Dagblad and Ságat. The northernmost winery is located here, using crowberries instead of grapes.

== Geography ==
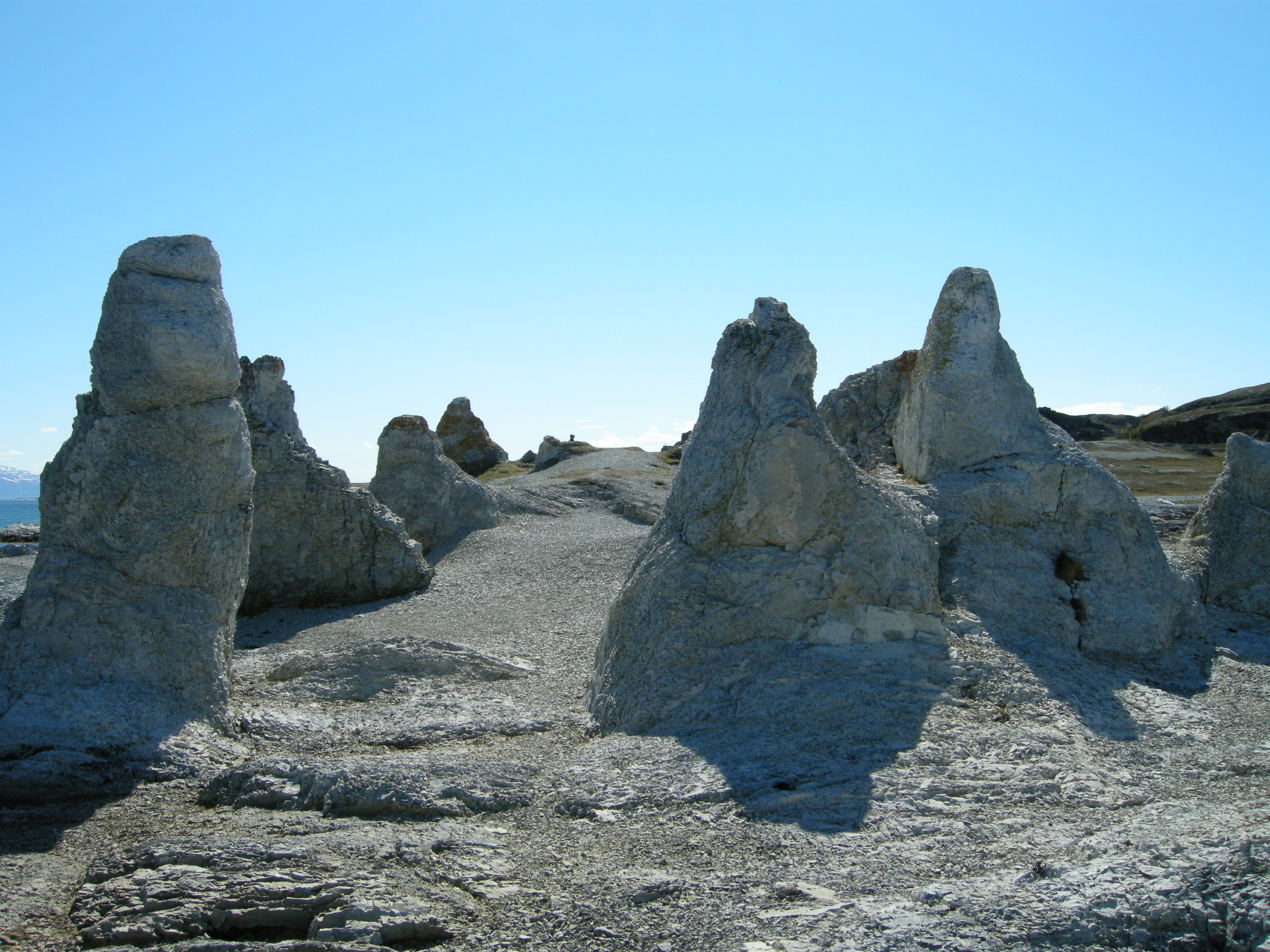
Trolls in Porsanger; naturally sculpted dolomite.

Porsanger Municipality is the third largest municipality in Norway by area, with 4,873 square kilometres (1,881 mi^{2}). The municipality surrounds the inner part of the Porsangerfjorden, the fourth longest fjord in Norway and the longest in Northern Norway. The highest point in the municipality is the 1,138.9-metre (3,737 ft) tall mountain Čohkkarášša.

The Porsangerfjorden is a wide, open body of water with many islands. The Porsanger Peninsula lies on the western shore of the fjord and the Sværholt Peninsula lies on the eastern shore. The biggest village (and municipal centre) is the village of Lakselv at the fjord's southern end. There are many smaller villages spread around the fjord on both sides, notably Kistrand, Olderfjord, Børselv, and Indre Billefjord.

Stabbursdalen National Park, with the world's northernmost pine forest, lies just west of the fjord and the village of Lakselv. The Stabburselva river runs through the park. Other notable rivers include the Børselva and Lakselva, both are well known for their salmon fishing. The lakes Gákkajávri and Kjæsvannet are both located in the municipality.

In Porsanger, there is midnight sun from 16 May until 27 July each year and there is polar night from 25 November to 16 January.

=== Birdlife ===
Porsanger is an area of rich and varied bird fauna. Here one can find such species as pine grosbeak. Away from the woodlands, it is the surrounding wetlands that have the greatest diversity. During spring, thousands of red knots stop to rest and feed along the shores of Porsangerfjord.

=== Climate ===
Lakselv has a boreal climate with modest precipitation and long winters, but still with annual mean well above freezing, ensuring there is no permafrost. The winters are less severe in terms of cold than would be expected for a town at 70 degrees latitude. The all-time high temperature 34.3 °C (93.7 °F) was recorded on 5 July 2021. This is the warmest temperature ever recorded north of 70 degrees North in Europe. The all-time low −33.6 °C (−28.5 °F) is from January 1986. The average date for the last overnight freeze (low below 0 °C (32.0 °F)) in spring is 24 May and average date for first freeze in autumn is 6 September giving a frost-free season of 105 days. The weather station (recording since August 1945) is located at Banak Airport, 1 kilometre (0.62 mi) from the town.

Climate data for Lakselv Airport, Banak in Porsanger 1991-2020 (5 m, extremes 1979-2025)
Month	Jan	Feb	Mar	Apr	May	Jun	Jul	Aug	Sep	Oct	Nov	Dec	Year
Record high °C (°F)	9.4 (48.9)	9.9 (49.8)	13 (55)	15.9 (60.6)	28.2 (82.8)	32.5 (90.5)	34.3 (93.7)	32.8 (91.0)	25 (77)	15.1 (59.2)	16 (61)	10.1 (50.2)	34.3 (93.7)
Mean daily maximum °C (°F)	−4.2 (24.4)	−4.5 (23.9)	−0.9 (30.4)	3.6 (38.5)	9 (48)	13.7 (56.7)	17.4 (63.3)	15.8 (60.4)	11.4 (52.5)	4.5 (40.1)	−0.4 (31.3)	−2.2 (28.0)	5.3 (41.5)
Daily mean °C (°F)	−7.9 (17.8)	−7.9 (17.8)	−4.5 (23.9)	0.1 (32.2)	5.3 (41.5)	9.6 (49.3)	12.9 (55.2)	11.6 (52.9)	7.8 (46.0)	1.9 (35.4)	−3.4 (25.9)	−5.7 (21.7)	1.7 (35.0)
Mean daily minimum °C (°F)	−11.8 (10.8)	−11.8 (10.8)	−8.5 (16.7)	−3.7 (25.3)	1.6 (34.9)	6.1 (43.0)	9.2 (48.6)	7.8 (46.0)	4.5 (40.1)	−0.8 (30.6)	−6.5 (20.3)	−9.2 (15.4)	−1.9 (28.5)
Record low °C (°F)	−33.6 (−28.5)	−33 (−27)	−29.9 (−21.8)	−24.7 (−12.5)	−11.4 (11.5)	−1.6 (29.1)	−0.2 (31.6)	−3.1 (26.4)	−9.2 (15.4)	−21.2 (−6.2)	−26.4 (−15.5)	−30 (−22)	−33.6 (−28.5)
Average precipitation mm (inches)	24.7 (0.97)	18.5 (0.73)	19.9 (0.78)	17.1 (0.67)	25.5 (1.00)	42.5 (1.67)	57.2 (2.25)	54.3 (2.14)	37.7 (1.48)	33.4 (1.31)	23.6 (0.93)	27.5 (1.08)	381.9 (15.01)
Average precipitation days (≥ 1.0 mm)	12	11	12	13	14	15	17	16	15	15	12	14	166
Source 1: yr.no/Norwegian Meteorological Institute
Source 2: NOAA WMO averages 91-2020 Norway

Climate data for Lakselv (Banak) 1961-1990
Month	Jan	Feb	Mar	Apr	May	Jun	Jul	Aug	Sep	Oct	Nov	Dec	Year
Mean daily maximum °C (°F)	−6.5 (20.3)	−5.5 (22.1)	−2.2 (28.0)	2.0 (35.6)	7.3 (45.1)	13.5 (56.3)	16.9 (62.4)	14.9 (58.8)	9.8 (49.6)	3.4 (38.1)	−1.3 (29.7)	−4.3 (24.3)	4.0 (39.2)
Daily mean °C (°F)	−10.0 (14.0)	−9.1 (15.6)	−6.1 (21.0)	−1.3 (29.7)	4.2 (39.6)	9.4 (48.9)	12.7 (54.9)	11.3 (52.3)	6.7 (44.1)	1.1 (34.0)	−4.3 (24.3)	−8.0 (17.6)	0.6 (33.1)
Mean daily minimum °C (°F)	−14.3 (6.3)	−13.0 (8.6)	−9.3 (15.3)	−4.8 (23.4)	0.8 (33.4)	6.0 (42.8)	9.2 (48.6)	7.7 (45.9)	3.6 (38.5)	−1.7 (28.9)	−7.4 (18.7)	−11.6 (11.1)	−2.9 (26.8)
Average precipitation mm (inches)	21 (0.8)	18 (0.7)	15 (0.6)	16 (0.6)	18 (0.7)	35 (1.4)	55 (2.2)	56 (2.2)	36 (1.4)	33 (1.3)	22 (0.9)	20 (0.8)	345 (13.6)
Average precipitation days (≥ 1 mm)	6.3	5.0	5.6	4.7	4.7	6.9	8.6	9.7	8.5	8.1	6.3	6.7	81.1
Source: Norwegian Meteorological Institute

== Notable people ==
- John Persen (1941–2014), a composer who grew up in Ráigeadja
- Synnøve Persen (born 1950 in Beavgohpis), a Norwegian/Sámi artist, author and activist
- Ivar Thomassen (1954 in Russenes – 2016), a folk singer, songwriter, and jazz pianist
- Arnljot Elgsæter (born 1944 in Kistrand), a physicist and academic
- Kåre Olli (born 1959), a Sami politician in the Labour Party
