= Kjæsvannet =

Lake in Lebesby and Porsanger municipalities, Norway

- Keaisajávri (Northern Sami); Stuorrajávri (Northern Sami)
- Interactive map of the lake
- Location: Finnmark
- Coordinates: 70.5927°N 26.1469°E
- Basin countries: Norway
- Max. length: 7 kilometres (4.3 mi)
- Max. width: 850 metres (2,790 ft)
- Surface area: 5.16 km^{2} (1.99 sq mi)
- Shore length^{1}: 20.39 kilometres (12.67 mi)
- Surface elevation: 47 metres (154 ft)
- References: NVE
- ^{1} Shore length is not a well-defined measure.

Kjæsvannet (Northern Sami: Keaisajávri or Stuorrajávri) is a lake on the border of Porsanger Municipality and Lebesby Municipality in Finnmark county, Norway. The 5.16-square-kilometre (1.99 sq mi) lake is located on the Sværholt Peninsula, about half-way between the villages of Veidnes and Brenna.

== See also ==
- List of lakes in Norway
