= Repvåg =

Repvåg (Norwegian); Reiffváhki (Northern Sami)
- Village
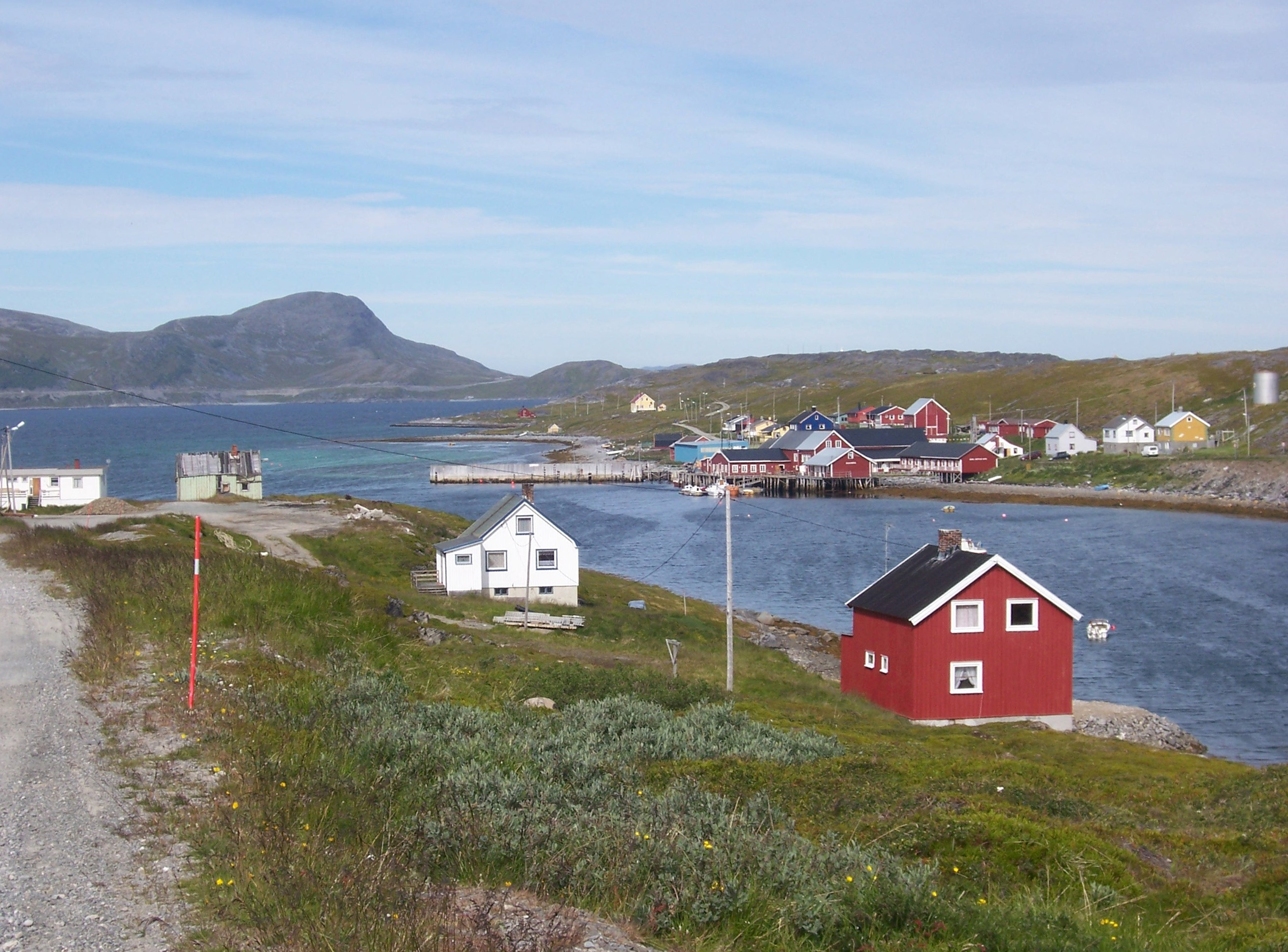
- View of the village
- Interactive map of: Repvåg (Norwegian); Reiffváhki (Northern Sami)
- Location within Finnmark Location within Norway
- Coordinates: 70°44′48″N 25°40′19″E
- Country: Norway
- Region: Northern Norway
- County: Finnmark
- District: Vest-Finnmark
- Municipality: Nordkapp Municipality
- Elevation: 3 m (9.8 ft)

Population
  - Total: 14
- Time zone: UTC+01:00 (CET)
  - Summer (DST): UTC+02:00 (CEST)
- Post Code: 9768 Repvåg

Repvåg (Norwegian) or Reiffváhki (Northern Sami) is a small fishing village in Nordkapp Municipality in Finnmark county, Norway. The village is located along the western shore of the Porsangerfjorden on the mainland Porsanger Peninsula.

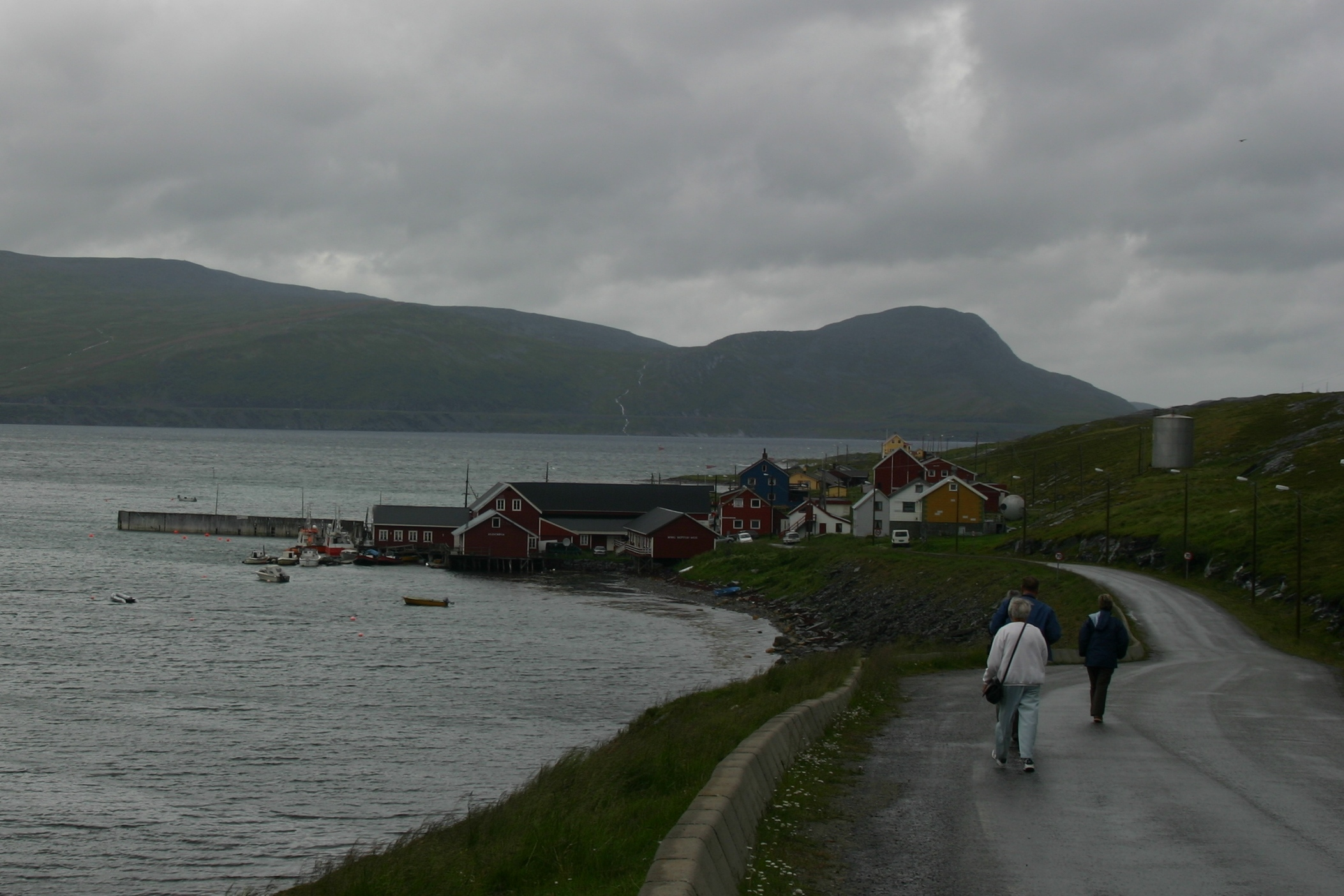
View of Repvåg

The fishing village now has about 14 residents, but historically, it was one of the main ports and trading places in Finnmark county, especially during the Pomor trade with Russia which existed until the 1917 revolution in Russia. Repvåg Chapel is located in the village, serving the people in the southern part of Nordkapp municipality.

Slightly outside of Repvåg, there is a small area called Stranda, meaning "Beach" in English (formerly "Finneby" or "Sáamisiida" in Northern Sámi) that had a large coastal Sami population and is the last area in the municipality that is still characterized by some coastal Sami culture.
