= Lakselv Church =

- Lakselv kirke
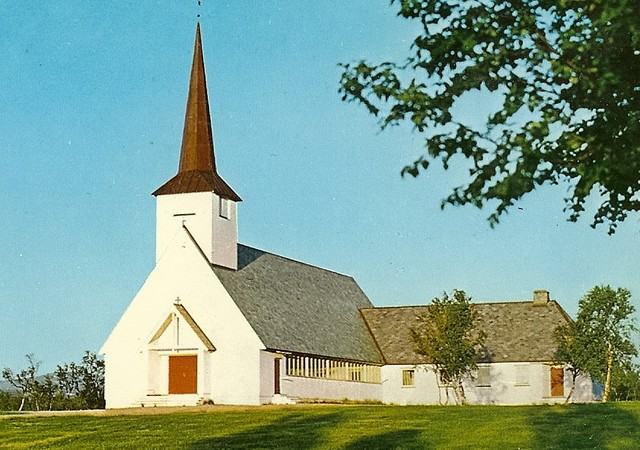
- View of the church
- Lakselv Church
- 70.050356°N 24.952947°E
- Location: Porsanger Municipality, Finnmark
- Country: Norway
- Denomination: Church of Norway
- Churchmanship: Evangelical Lutheran

History
- Status: Parish church
- Founded: 1865
- Consecrated: 1963

Architecture
- Functional status: Active
- Architect: Eyvind Moestue
- Architectural type: Long church
- Completed: 1963 (63 years ago)

Specifications
- Capacity: 400
- Materials: Wood

Administration
- Diocese: Nord-Hålogaland
- Deanery: Indre Finnmark prosti
- Parish: Porsanger
- Norwegian Cultural Heritage Site
- Type: Church
- Status: Not protected
- ID: 84885

Lakselv Church (Norwegian: Lakselv kirke) is a parish church of the Church of Norway in Porsanger Municipality in Finnmark county, Norway. It is located in the village of Lakselv. It is one of the churches for the Porsanger parish which is part of the Indre Finnmark prosti (deanery) in the Diocese of Nord-Hålogaland. The white, wooden church was built in a long church style in 1963 using plans drawn up by the architect Eyvind Moestue. The church seats about 400 people.

== History ==
The first chapel in Lakselv was built in 1865. It was constructed by local volunteer labor and it was consecrated on 2 October 1865. The small chapel measured about 15.5 by 7.8 metres (51 ft × 26 ft) and it did not have an altarpiece for the first several decades in its existence. In 1897, the altarpiece from Kistrand Church was gifted to Lakselv chapel. The church was painted red until 1906 when it was painted white. In the late 1920s, the chapel was extensively renovated. It was re-consecrated on 14 September 1930. During World War II, the occupying German army stationed soldiers in Lakselv. On 20 September 1942, the chapel held its last service because after that time, the Germans took over the chapel and used it as a storage building. On 26 November 1944, Lakselv Chapel was burned to the ground by the German occupying forces as part of "the scorched earth tactics" that they employed as they retreated from Finnmark. After the war when funds were available, the church was rebuilt in 1963.

== See also ==
- List of churches in Nord-Hålogaland
