= Skoganvarre =

Skoganvarre Skoganvarre (Norwegian) Skuvvanvárri (Northern Sami) Skuukanvaara (Kven)
- Village
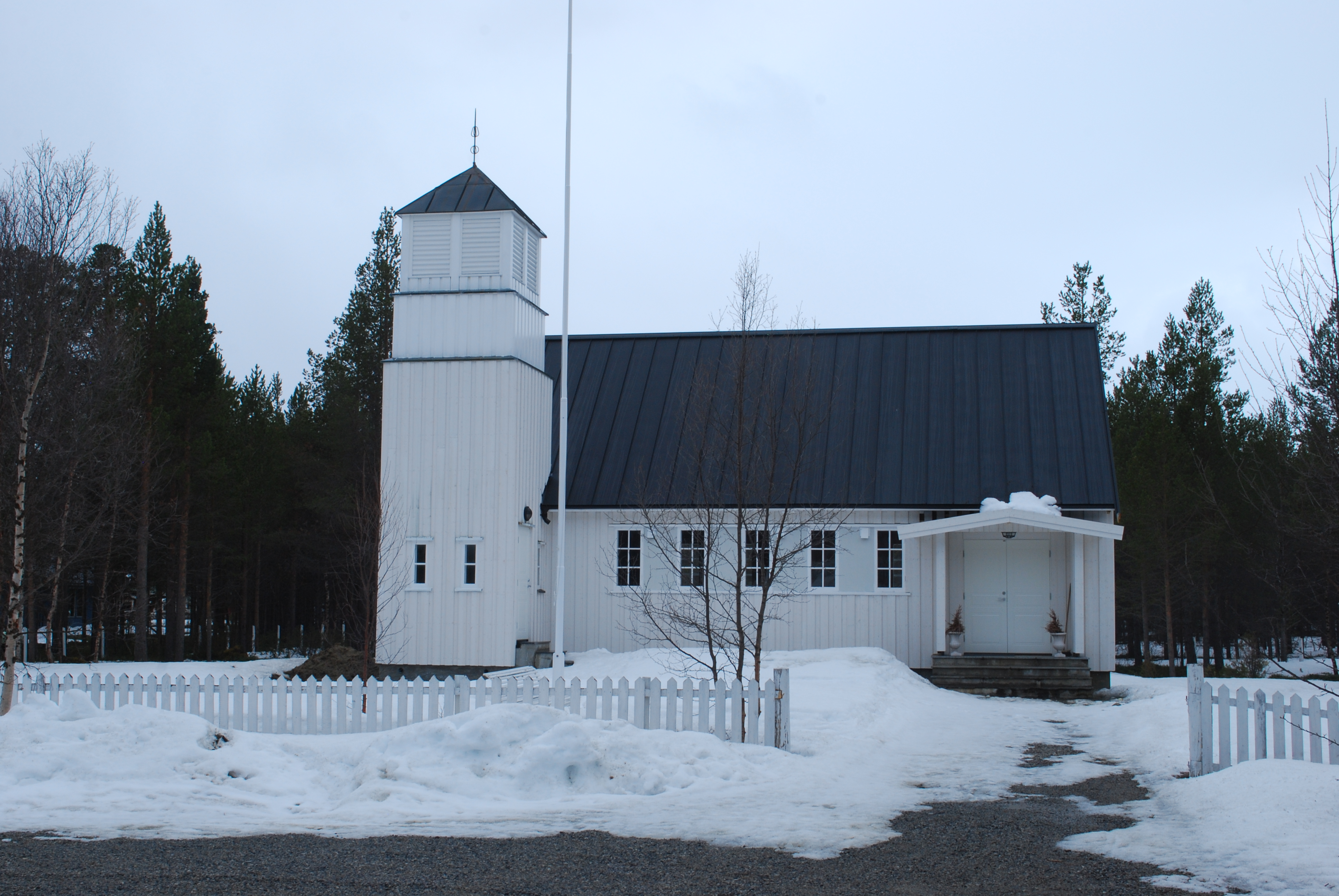
- View of the village
- Interactive map of Skoganvarre
- Location within Finnmark Location within Norway
- Coordinates: 69°50′23″N 25°04′41″E
- Country: Norway
- Region: Northern Norway
- County: Finnmark
- District: Vest-Finnmark
- Municipality: Porsanger
- Elevation: 76 m (249 ft)
- Time zone: UTC+01:00 (CET)
  - Summer (DST): UTC+02:00 (CEST)
- Post Code: 9722 Skoganvarre

Skoganvarre (Norwegian), Skuvvanvárri (Northern Sami), or Skuukanvaara (Kven) is a village in Porsanger Municipality in Finnmark county, Norway. The village is located along the Lakselva river and the European route E06 highway, about half-way between the villages of Lakselv and Karasjok. The lake Gákkajávri lies just east of the village. The village is an old settlement, located on old roads crossing Finnmark. The Skoganvarre Chapel is located in the village.
