= Sværholtklubben Nature Reserve =

Nature reserve in Norway

Coordinates: 70°58′01″N 26°40′48″E

The Sværholtklubben Nature Reserve is a protected area of land at the northern tip of the Sværholt Peninsula in Finnmark county, Norway. It comprises a rugged promontory with steep cliffs that provide nesting sites for some 40,000 seabirds. A 220 ha area encompassing the reserve and its adjacent marine waters has been designated an Important Bird Area (IBA) by BirdLife International.
