= Ivar Thomassen =

Norwegian folk singer-songwriter and pianist

Ivar Thomassen (19 July 1954 – 28 November 2016) was a Norwegian folk singer, songwriter, and jazz pianist.

== Biography ==
Thomassen was from Russenes in Porsanger Municipality in Norway. He lived in Alta Municipality and taught at Alta high school. From 1989 to 1997, he worked as district musician in Vadsø Municipality.

Thomassen composed and performed serious folk songs. Themes in these ballads have included the county and the region's nature, culture and history. Songs like Imella multebær og mygg and Det artige landet are frequently performed by local choirs and are well known among people from Finnmark. Thomassen was also active as a pianist in big bands and jazz ensembles, and contributed with his own compositions in this context. He did school concerts, arranged music, composed choral works and gave piano lessons. Thomassen lived in Alta and taught at the program for music, dance and drama at Alta High School. He also wrote the youth book Operasjon kråkereir.

== Discography ==
- 2003: Attmed Havet (Nordisc)
- 2011:Særlig Når Timan E Blå (Reflect)

== Bibliography ==
- 2006: Attmed havet (Trane forlag) sheet music paperback
- 2007: Operasjon kråkereir (Trane forlag)
