= Sværholt Peninsula =

Peninsula in Finnmark, Norway

Sværholt Peninsula: Sværholthalvøya (Norwegian); Spierttanjárga (Northern Sami)
- Peninsula
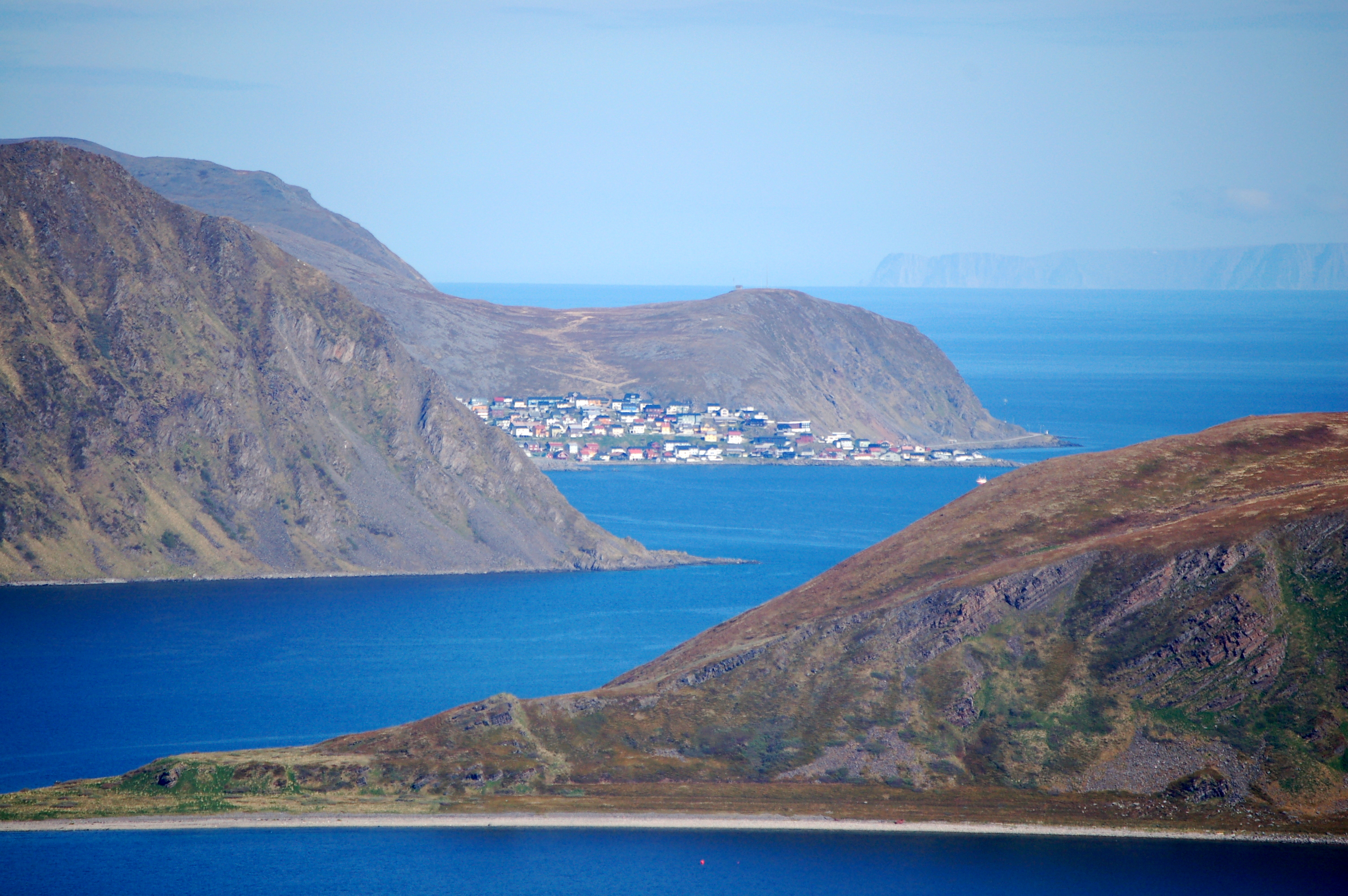
- View of the Sværholt Peninsula in far right background

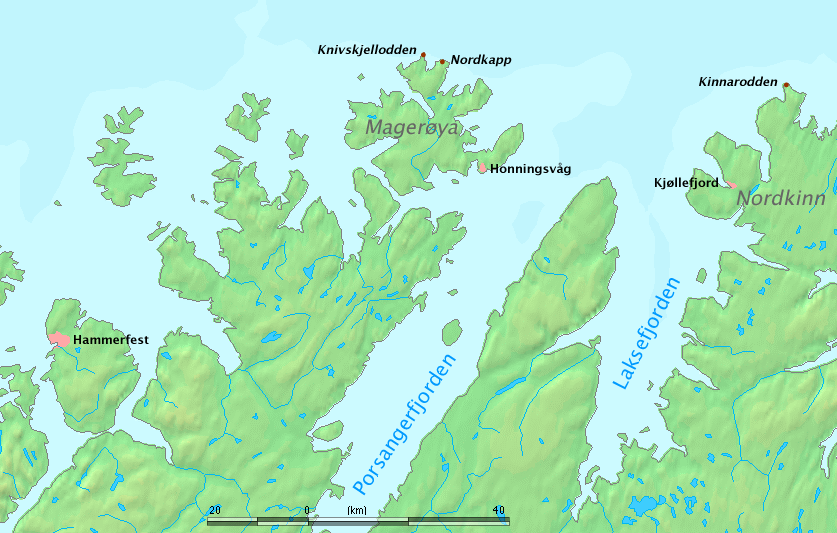
- The Sværholt Peninsula lies between the Porsangerfjorden and Laksefjorden
- Coordinates: 70°46′59″N 26°25′59″E
- Location: Finnmark, Norway

The Sværholt Peninsula (Norwegian: Sværholthalvøya or Northern Sami: Spierttanjárga) is a peninsula in Finnmark county, Norway. The peninsula lies between the Porsangerfjorden and Laksefjorden in the municipalities of Nordkapp, Lebesby, and Porsanger. The 70-kilometre (43 mi) peninsula has some settlements, mostly on the inner part of the peninsula. The villages of Veidnes and Brenna are two of the larger settlements on the Sværholt Peninsula. The lake Kjæsvannet lies in the central part of the peninsula. The Sværholtklubben Nature Reserve lies at the northern tip of the peninsula.

== See also ==
- List of peninsulas
