= Gákkajávri =

Lake in Porsanger, Norway

Gákkajávri (Northern Sami); Gaggavann (Norwegian)
- Gaggajavri (historic name)
- Interactive map of the lake
- Location: Finnmark
- Coordinates: 69.8629°N 25.1675°E
- Basin countries: Norway
- Max. length: 7.1 kilometres (4.4 mi)
- Max. width: 1.7 kilometres (1.1 mi)
- Surface area: 7.4 km^{2} (2.9 sq mi)
- Shore length^{1}: 28.2 kilometres (17.5 mi)
- Surface elevation: 101 metres (331 ft)
- References: NVE
- ^{1} Shore length is not a well-defined measure.

Gákkajávri (Northern Sami) or Gaggavann (Norwegian) is a lake that lies in Porsanger Municipality in Finnmark county, Norway. The 7.4-square-kilometre (2.9 sq mi) lake lies just east of the European route E06 highway, between the villages of Lakselv and Karasjok.

The village of Skoganvarre and the lake Øvrevann, popular tourist areas, are located on the west side of the lake. In the winter time, this area is a popular setting-off point for ski- and snow scooter activities. In the south, there is a small power station and Porsanger's largest housing estate.
