= Kåre Olli =

Norwegian Sami Arbeiderparti politician

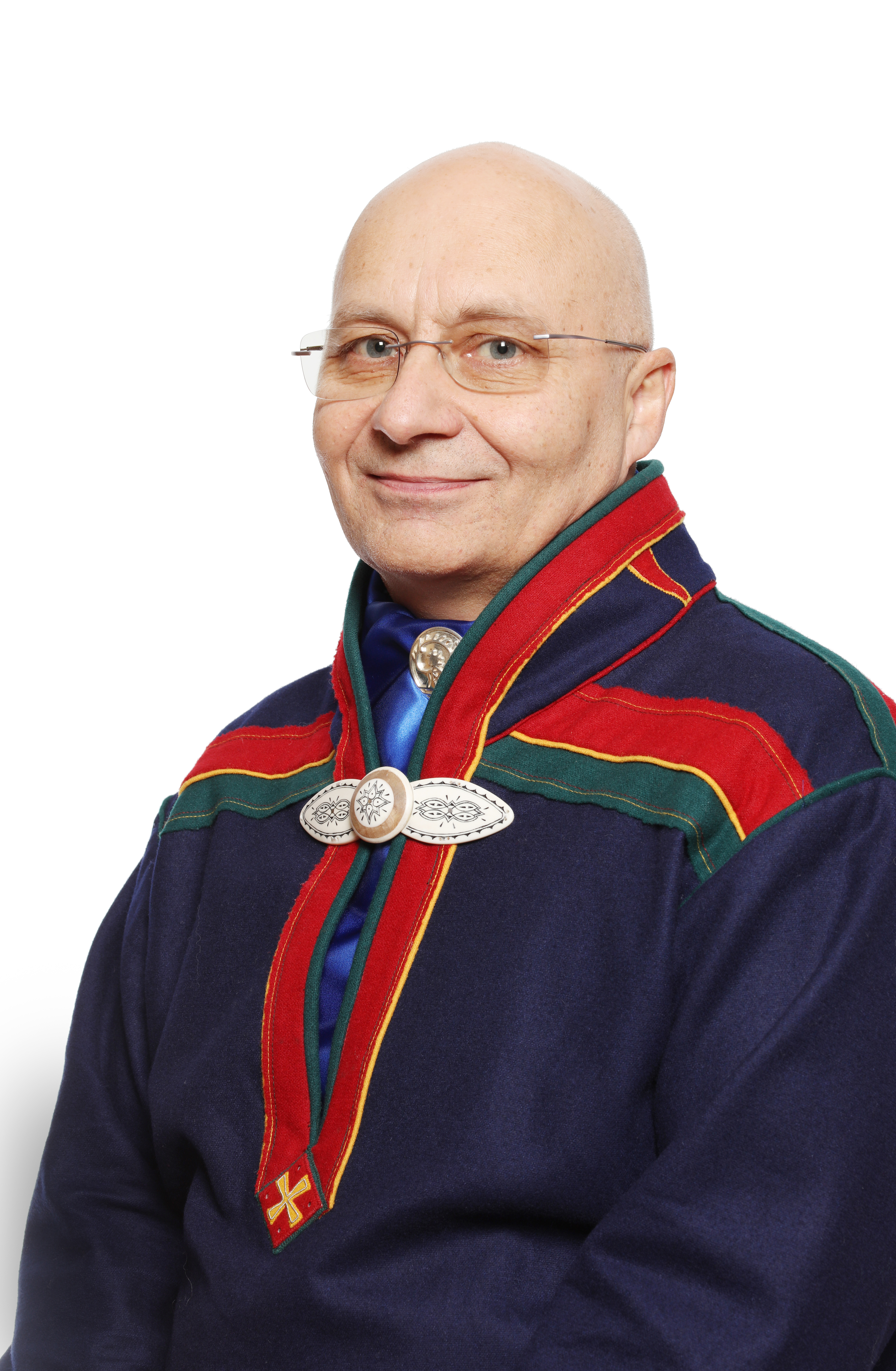

member of the Sametinget

Personal details
- Born: 1 March 1959
- Political party: Arbeiderparti

Kåre Ivar Olli (born 1 March 1959) is a Norwegian Sami Arbeiderparti politician, a member of the Sametinget since 2017. He represents Ávjovárri constituency.

He is educated as an agronomist, holds a professional certificate in the labor and professional driver professions, as well as basic courses in crafts and industrial sciences. He has worked as a driver and as per 2017 is traffic manager at Boreal Buss.

From 1995 to 2015 he was a member of the municipal council of the Labor Party in Porsanger Municipality.
