= Repvåg Church =

- Repvåg kirke
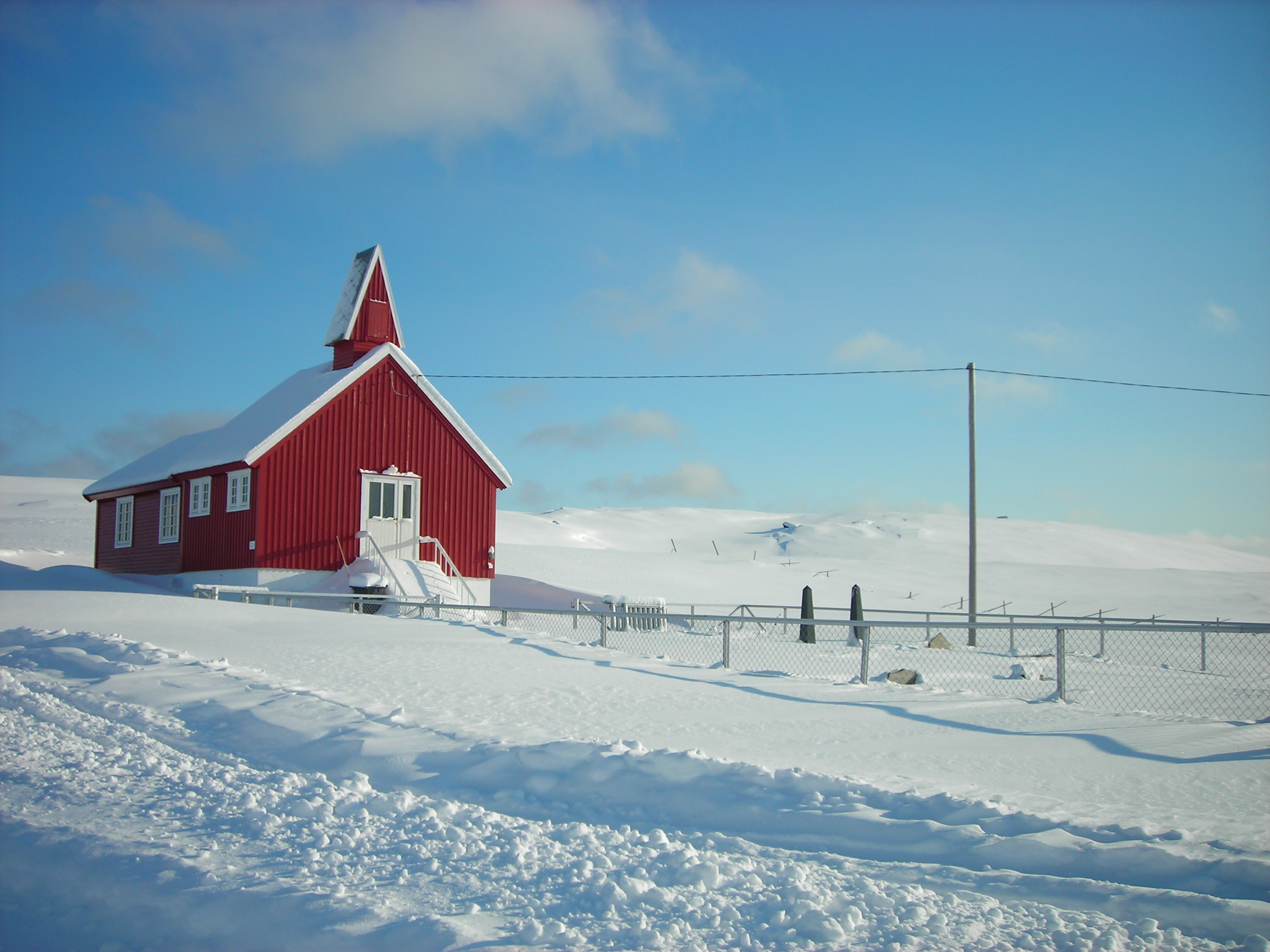
- View of the church
- Repvåg Church
- 70.739458°N 25.666702°E
- Location: Nordkapp Municipality, Finnmark
- Country: Norway
- Denomination: Church of Norway
- Churchmanship: Evangelical Lutheran

History
- Former name: Repvåg kapell
- Status: Chapel
- Founded: 1967
- Consecrated: 1967

Architecture
- Functional status: Active
- Architect: Trond Dancke
- Architectural type: Long church
- Completed: 1967 (59 years ago)

Specifications
- Capacity: 50
- Materials: Wood

Administration
- Diocese: Nord-Hålogaland
- Deanery: Hammerfest prosti
- Parish: Nordkapp
- Norwegian Cultural Heritage Site
- Type: Church
- Status: Not protected
- ID: 85290

Repvåg Church (Norwegian: Repvåg kirke) is a chapel of the Church of Norway in Nordkapp Municipality in Finnmark county, Norway. It is located in the village of Repvåg. It is an annex chapel for the Nordkapp parish which is part of the Hammerfest prosti (deanery) in the Diocese of Nord-Hålogaland. The red, wooden church was built in a long church style in 1967 using plans drawn up by the architect Trond Dancke. The church seats about 50 people. The church is only used a couple of times per year for worship services.

== See also ==
- List of churches in Nord-Hålogaland
