= Kistrand =

Kistrand (Norwegian) Čuđegieddi (Northern Sami) Ryssämarkka (Kven)
- Village
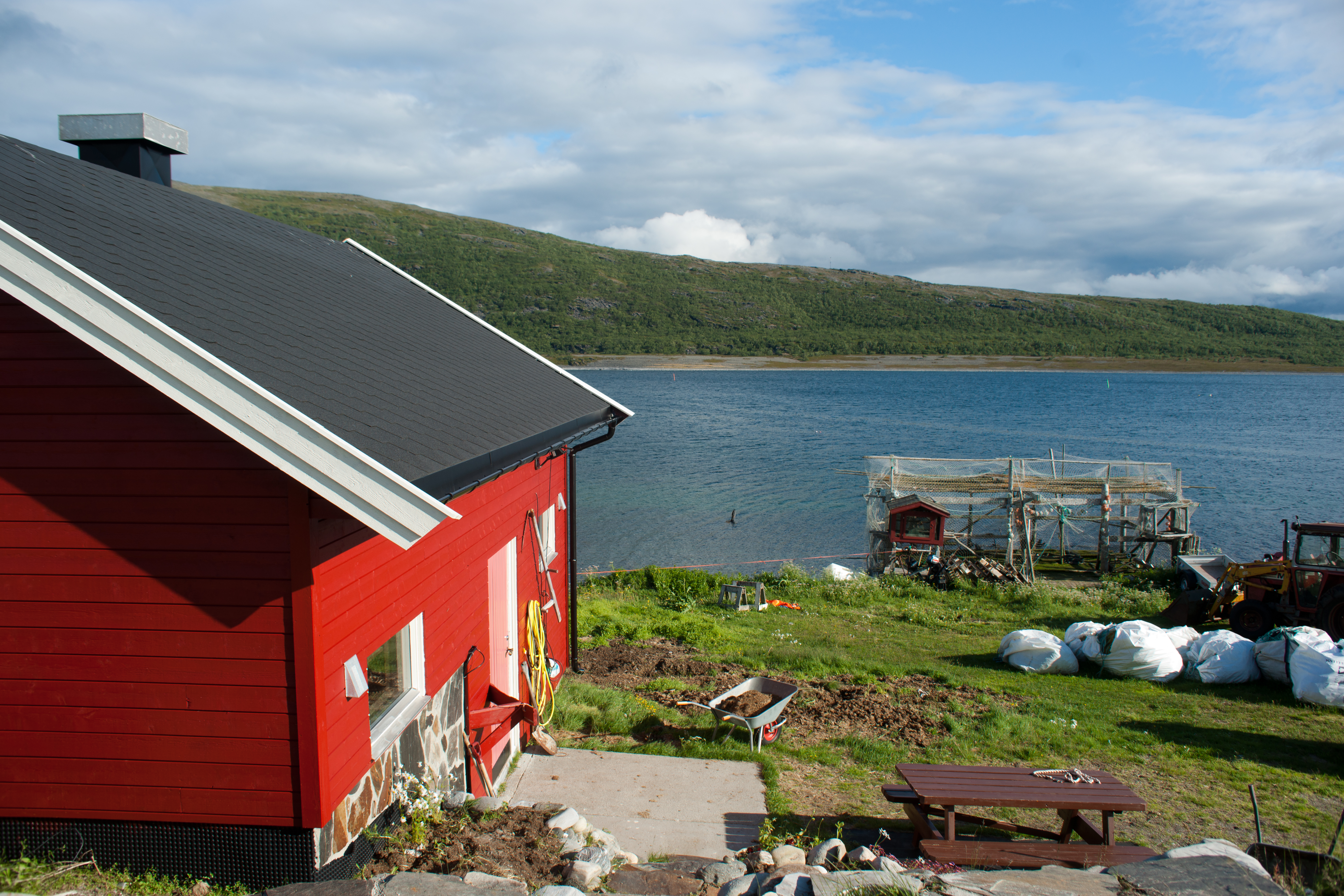
- View of a building in the village
- Interactive map of Kistrand (Norwegian); Čuđegieddi (Northern Sami); Ryssämarkka (Kven)
- Location within Finnmark Location within Norway
- Coordinates: 70°26′18″N 25°11′58″E
- Country: Norway
- Region: Northern Norway
- County: Finnmark
- District: Vest-Finnmark
- Municipality: Porsanger
- Elevation: 34 m (112 ft)
- Time zone: UTC+01:00 (CET)
  - Summer (DST): UTC+02:00 (CEST)
- Post Code: 9713 Russenes

Kistrand (Norwegian), Čuđegieddi (Northern Sami), or Ryssämarkka (Kven) is a village in Porsanger Municipality in Finnmark county, Norway, on the eastern side of the Porsanger Peninsula, along the western shore of the Porsangerfjorden. The village lies along the European route E06 highway, about 10 kilometres (6.2 mi) southeast of the village of Olderfjord.

== History ==
Kistrand was the name of Porsanger Municipality from 1 January 1838 until 1 January 1964 when it was changed to Porsanger. The municipality was named after the parish of Kistrand, based at the Kistrand Church which is in this village. Originally (in 1838), Kistrand municipality was very large and it encompassed the present-day municipalities of Porsanger, Nordkapp, Kautokeino, and Karasjok.
