= Porsangerfjorden =

Fjord in northern Norway

Porsangerfjorden (Norwegian)
- Porsáŋgguvuotna (Northern Sami); Porsanginvuono (Kven)
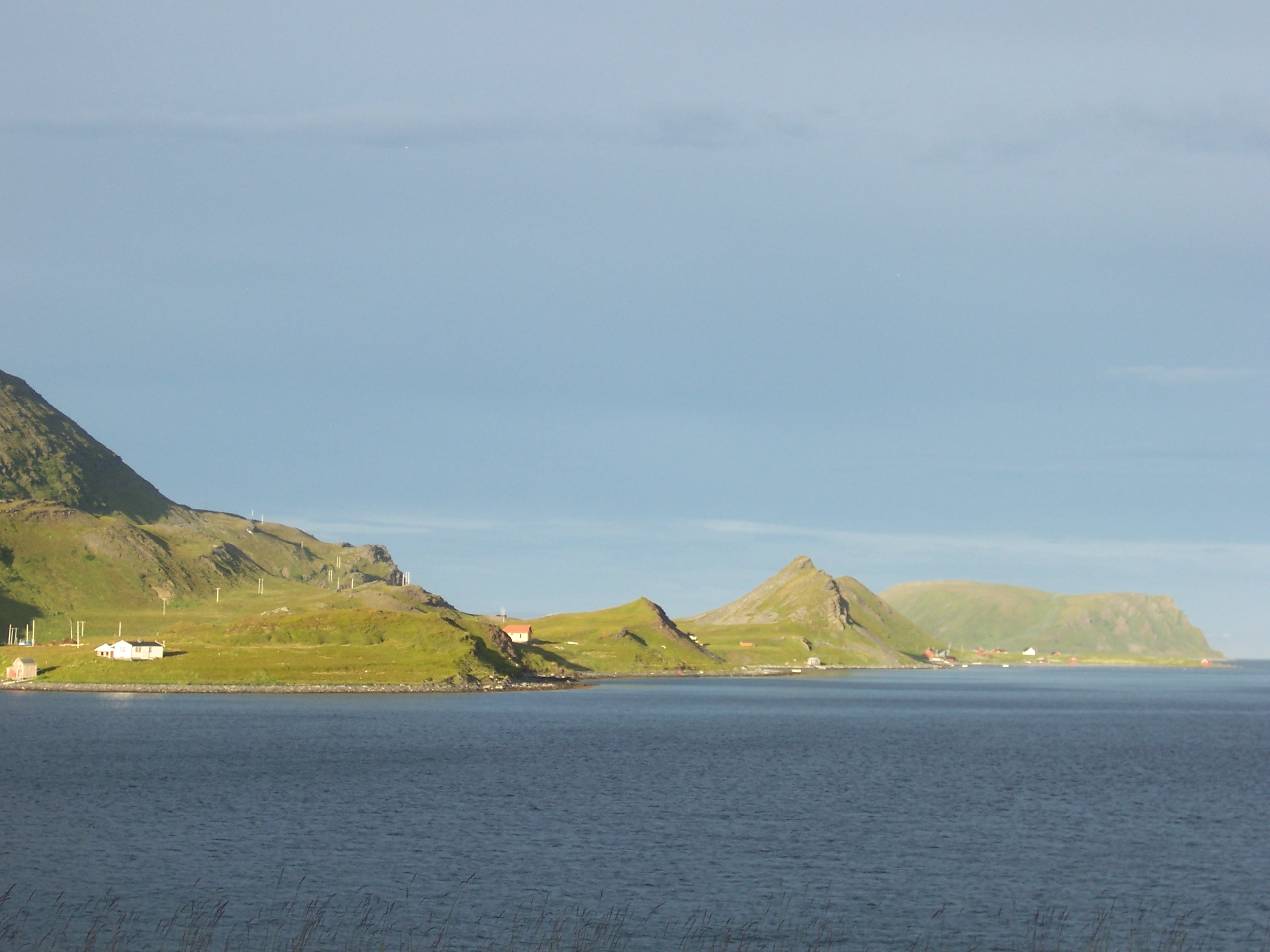
- View of the western side of the fjord
- Interactive map of the fjord
- Location: Finnmark county, Norway
- Coordinates: 70.1983°N 25.0758°E
- Type: Fjord
- Basin countries: Norway
- Max. length: 123 kilometres (76 mi)
- Max. width: 24 kilometres (15 mi)
- Settlements: Lakselv, Honningsvåg

The Porsangerfjorden (English: Porsanger Fjord; Northern Sami: Porsáŋgguvuotna; Kven: Porsanginvuono) is a fjord in Finnmark county, Norway.

== Name ==
The fjord is officially named Porsangerfjorden in Norwegian. It is also known informally as Porsangen, but that is not an official name. The official Northern Sami name is Porsáŋgguvuotna and the official Kven name is Porsanginvuono.

== Geography ==
The 123-kilometre (76 mi) long fjord is Norway's fourth-longest fjord. It is located in Nordkapp Municipality and Porsanger Municipality and it empties out into the Barents Sea. The large island of Magerøya and the Porsanger Peninsula lie along the western shore of the fjord, and the Sværholt Peninsula lies along the eastern shore of the fjord. The Helnes Lighthouse sits at the mouth of the fjord, on the western coast. The village of Lakselv sits at the innermost part (southern part) of the fjord. Other settlements along the fjord include the villages of Brenna, Børselv, Indre Billefjord, Kistrand, Olderfjord, Repvåg, and Nordvågen. The town of Honningsvåg is also located near the mouth of the fjord. There are many islands inside the fjord, notably Tamsøya and Reinøya.

== Important Bird Area ==
A 50,290-hectare (502.9 km^{2}; 194.2 mi^{2}) area comprising the inner (southern) part of the fjord, as well as several small islands and a strip along the mid-eastern shore, has been designated an Important Bird Area (IBA) by BirdLife International because it supports populations of many birds, including lesser white-fronted geese, long-tailed ducks, common eiders, velvet scoters, red-breasted mergansers, bar-tailed godwits, red knots and purple sandpipers. Habitats include mudflats, heathland, grassland, salt marsh, mires and birch forest.

== Media gallery ==
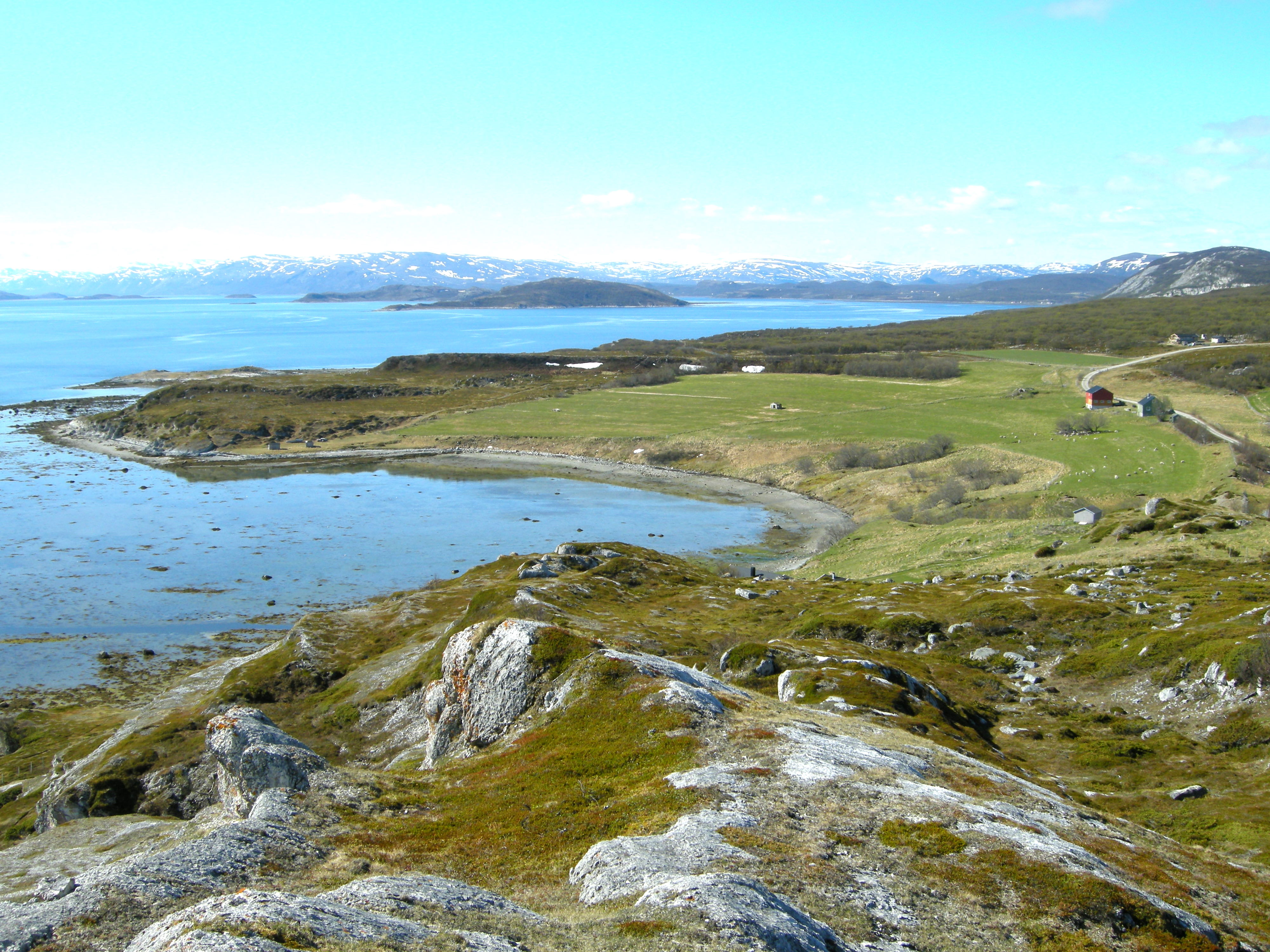
Orkkanluokta in Porsangerfjorden

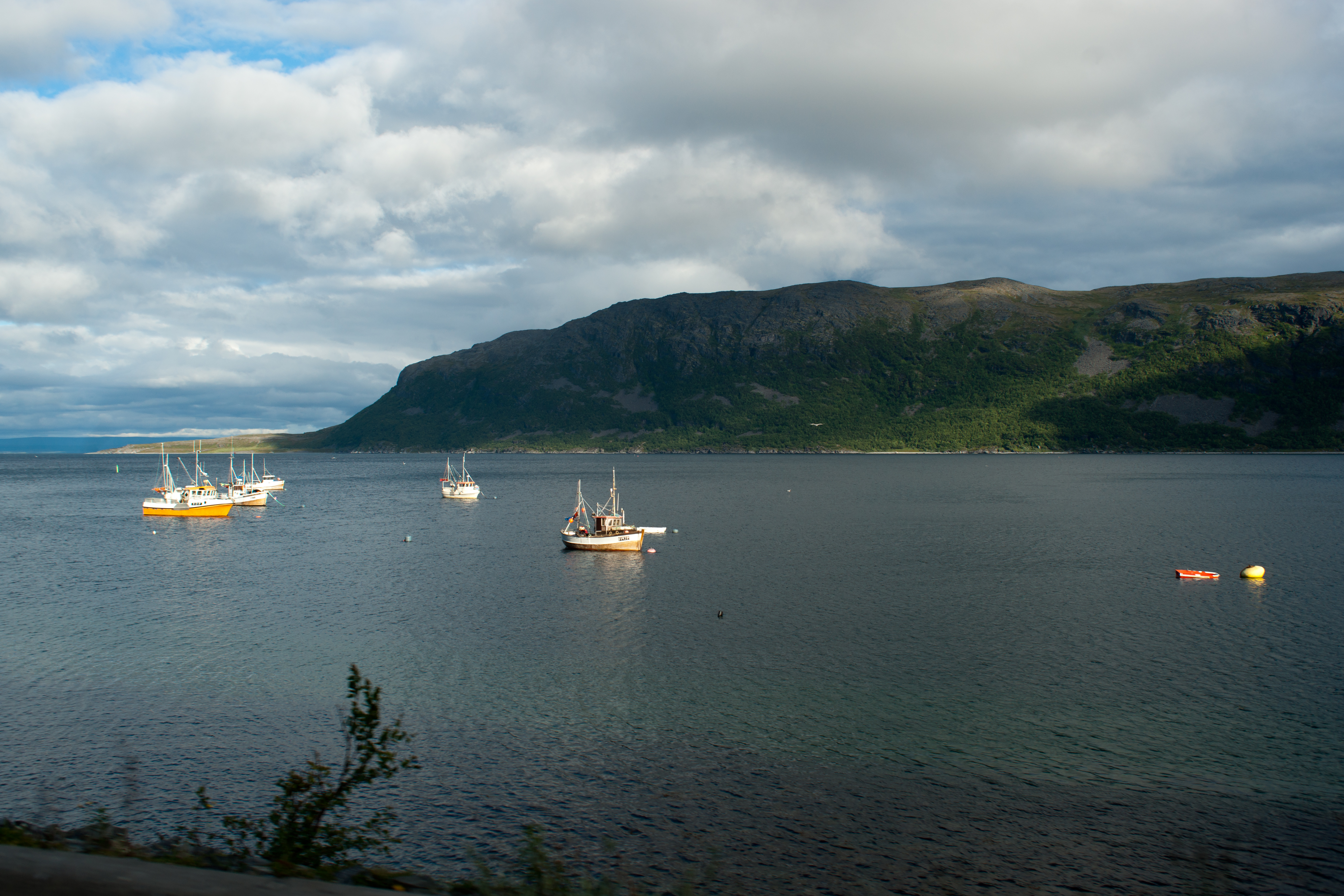
View near Kistrand

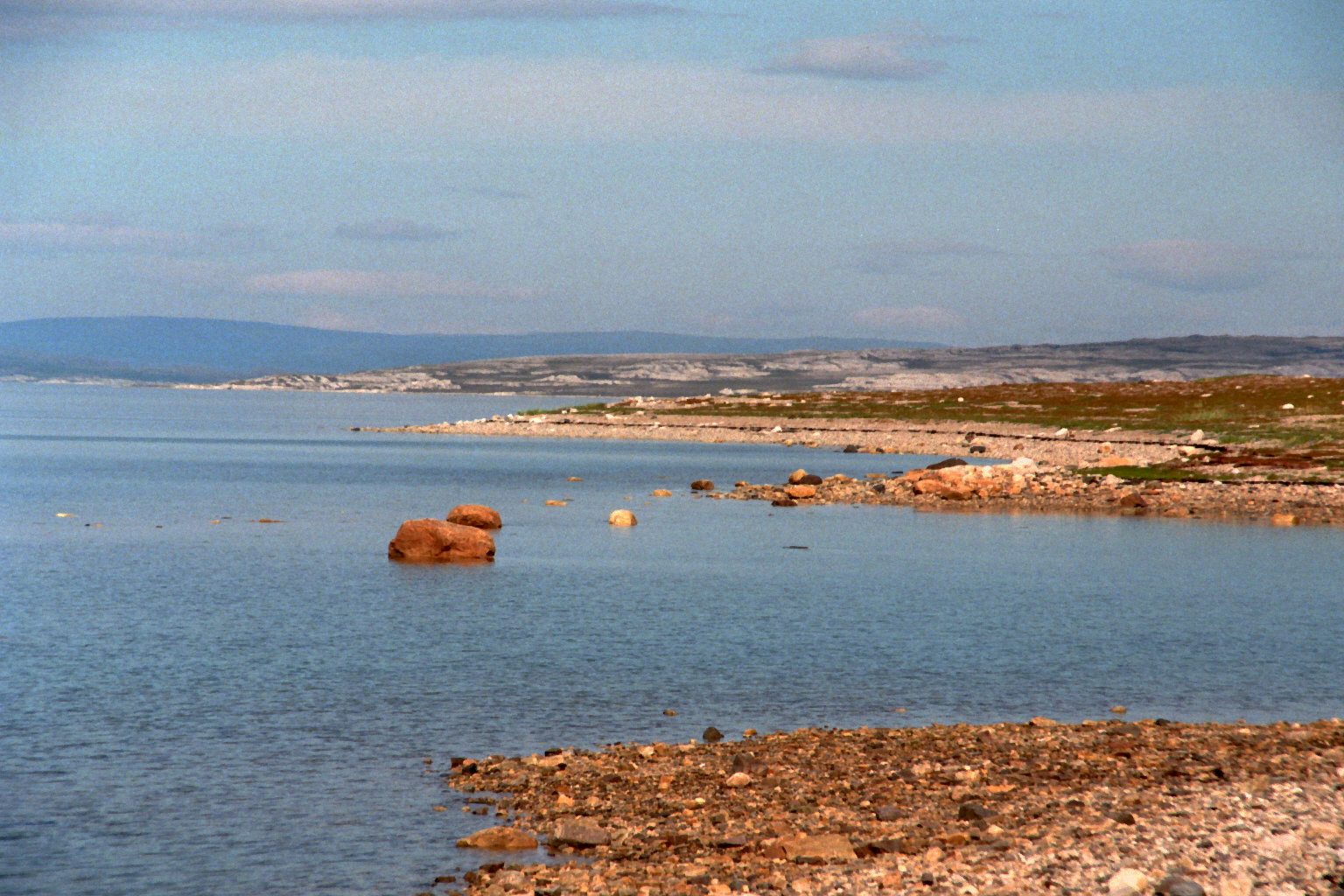
View of the coastline

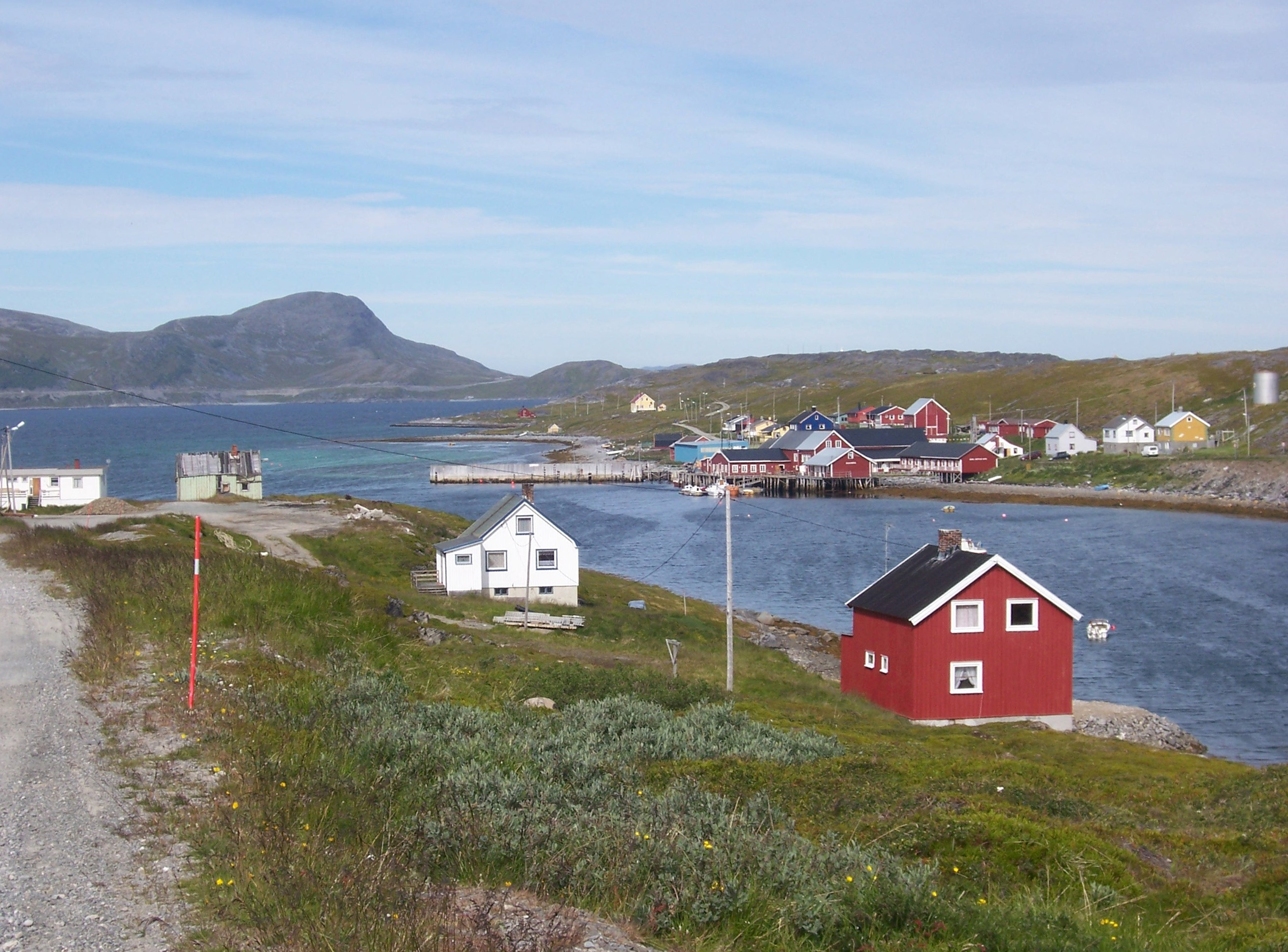
View of the fishing village of Repvåg

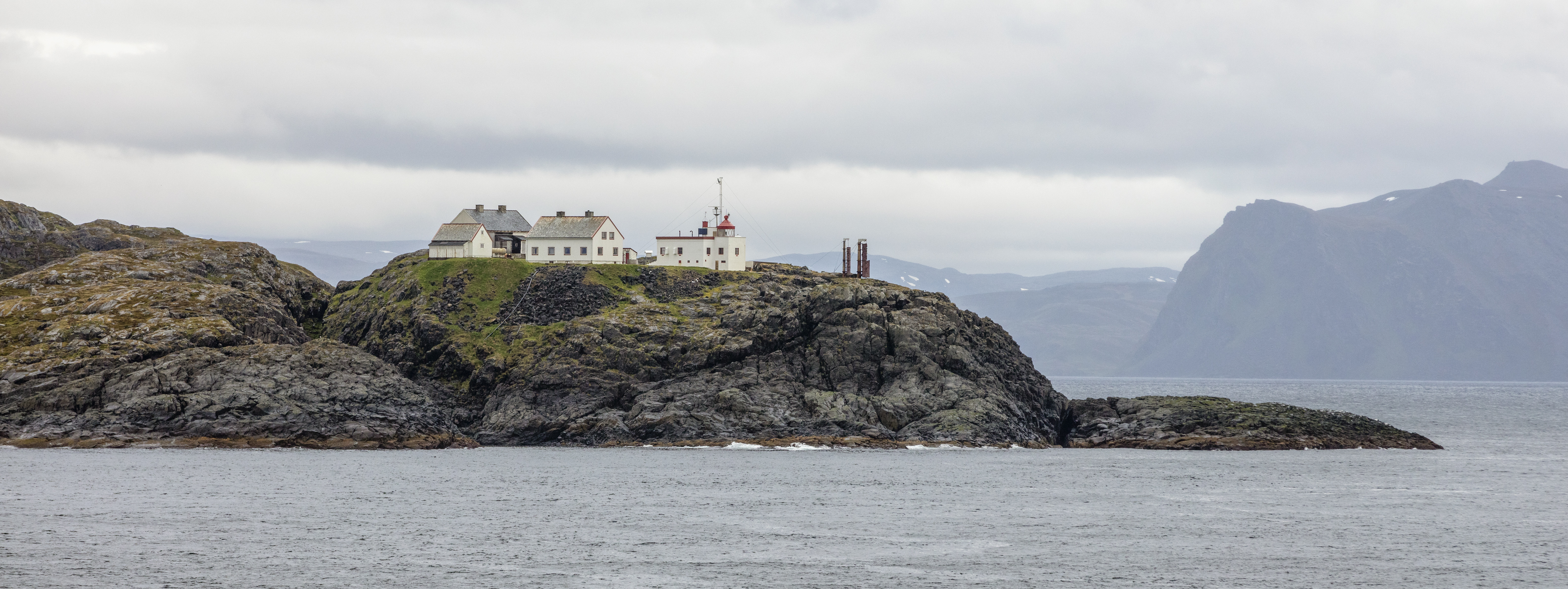
Helnes fyr, Magerøya
