= Arnljot Elgsæter =

Norwegian physicist

Arnljot Elgsæter (born 19 March 1944 in Kistrand) is a Norwegian physicist.

He is now a professor emeritus who held a tenured position at the Department of Physics at the Norwegian Institute of Technology (NTH) / Norwegian University of Science and Technology (NTNU) from 1974 to 2009. While at NTNU, he served twice as department chair and once as dean. He holds a master of technology in Engineering physics from NTH in 1969, and received a Ph.D. in biophysics from University of California, Berkeley in 1971, under the supervision of Daniel Branton.

Arnljot Elgsæter is a member of the Royal Norwegian Society of Sciences and Letters and the Norwegian Academy of Technological Sciences.
