= Brenna Chapel =

Church in Finnmark, Norway

- Brenna kapell
- Brenna Chapel
- 70.507966°N 25.740802°E
- Location: Porsanger Municipality, Finnmark
- Country: Norway
- Denomination: Church of Norway
- Churchmanship: Evangelical Lutheran

History
- Status: Chapel
- Founded: 1971
- Consecrated: 1971

Architecture
- Functional status: Active
- Architect: Edvard Bruvoll
- Architectural type: Long church
- Completed: 1971 (55 years ago)

Specifications
- Capacity: 55
- Materials: Wood

Administration
- Diocese: Nord-Hålogaland
- Deanery: Indre Finnmark prosti
- Parish: Porsanger
- Norwegian Cultural Heritage Site
- Type: Church
- Status: Not protected
- ID: 83954

Brenna Chapel (Norwegian: Brenna kapell) is a chapel of the Church of Norway in Porsanger Municipality in Finnmark county, Norway. It is located in the village of Brenna. It is an annex chapel for the Porsanger parish which is part of the Indre Finnmark prosti (deanery) in the Diocese of Nord-Hålogaland. The white, wooden church was built in a long church style in 1971 by the architect Edvard Bruvoll. The church seats about 55 people.

== See also ==
- List of churches in Nord-Hålogaland
