= Peter Valeur =

Norwegian politician

Peter Valeur (27 July 1847 – 3 August 1922) was a Norwegian politician for the Coalition Party. Born in Bergen, he embarked on a career in the military, parallel with law studies. He graduated as cand.jur. in 1873. After a series of civil jobs he settled in Kristiansand in 1892 as a postmaster.

He was a member of Kristiansand city council for an unknown period. He was elected to the Norwegian Parliament in 1907, representing the constituency of Fæstningen but served only one term.
