= Brenna, Finnmark =

Brenna, Finnmark Brenna (Norwegian) Prännä (Kven) Breannjá (Northern Sami)
- Village
- Interactive map of Brenna, Finnmark
- Location within Finnmark Location within Norway
- Coordinates: 70°30′22″N 25°43′54″E
- Country: Norway
- Region: Northern Norway
- County: Finnmark
- District: Vest-Finnmark
- Municipality: Porsanger
- Elevation: 13 m (43 ft)
- Time zone: UTC+01:00 (CET)
  - Summer (DST): UTC+02:00 (CEST)
- Post Code: 9716 Børselv

Brenna (Norwegian), Breannjá (Northern Sami), or Prännä (Kven) is a village in Porsanger Municipality in Finnmark county, Norway. The village is located on the western coast of the Sværholt Peninsula, on the eastern shore of the Porsangerfjorden. The village lies about 30 kilometres (19 mi) north of the village of Børselv. Brenna Chapel is located in this small village.
