= Kistrand Church =

- Kistrand kirke
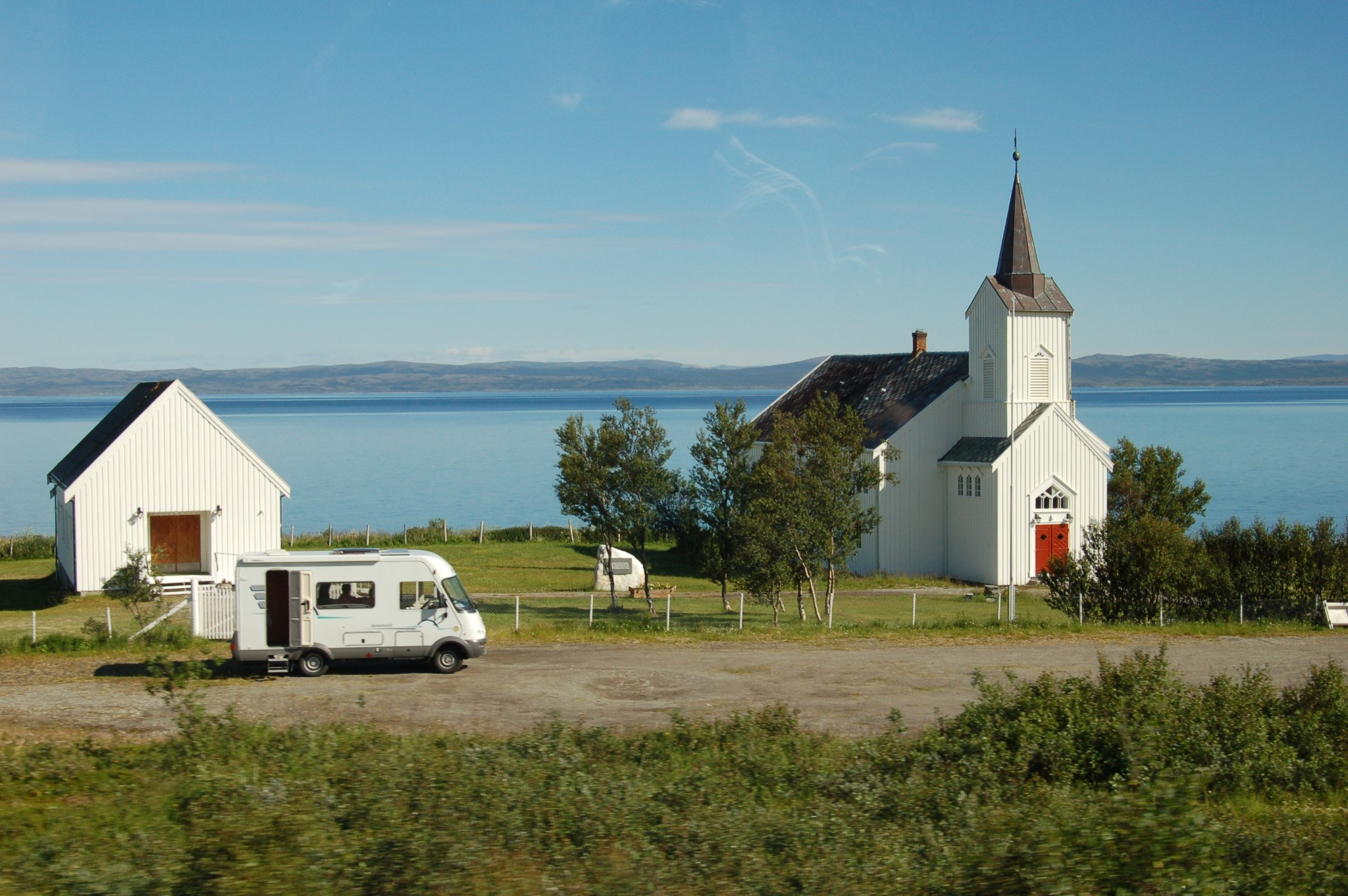
- View of the church
- Kistrand Church
- 70.456391°N 25.228332°E
- Location: Porsanger Municipality, Finnmark
- Country: Norway
- Denomination: Church of Norway
- Churchmanship: Evangelical Lutheran

History
- Status: Parish church
- Founded: 1719
- Consecrated: 7 Sept 1856

Architecture
- Functional status: Active
- Architect: Christian Heinrich Grosch
- Architectural type: Long church
- Completed: 1856 (170 years ago)

Specifications
- Capacity: 160
- Materials: Wood

Administration
- Diocese: Nord-Hålogaland
- Deanery: Indre Finnmark prosti
- Parish: Porsanger
- Norwegian Cultural Heritage Site
- Type: Church
- Status: Listed
- ID: 84781

Kistrand Church (Norwegian: Kistrand kirke) is a parish church of the Church of Norway in Porsanger Municipality in Finnmark county, Norway. It is located in the village of Kistrand. It is the main church for the Porsanger parish which is part of the Indre Finnmark prosti (deanery) in the Diocese of Nord-Hålogaland. The white, wooden church was built in a long church style in 1856 using plans drawn up by the architect Christian Heinrich Grosch. The church seats about 160 people.

== History ==
The first church in Kistrand was built in 1719. The church was a small long church made out of wood. In 1763, two side arms were added to give it a cruciform design. In 1803, the old church was torn down and a new church was built on the same site.

In 1814, this church served as an election church (Norwegian: valgkirke). Together with more than 300 other parish churches across Norway, it was a polling station for elections to the 1814 Norwegian Constituent Assembly which wrote the Constitution of Norway. This was Norway's first national elections. Each church parish was a constituency that elected people called "electors" who later met together in each county to elect the representatives for the assembly that was to meet in Eidsvoll later that year.

In the 1850s, discussions began on the construction of a new church. In August 1855, the parish priest Peter Valeur returned from a trip and discovered to his surprise that a carpenter from Tromsø had been hired to demolish the old church. The priest contacted the leadership for the Tromsø diocese and he found out that the demolition of the church had not been approved by them either. The priest worked with the diocese to come up with a solution. The bishop consecrated a room in the rectory where he could perform the church rituals until a new church was built. The new church was consecrated on 7 September 1856. The church was originally painted red.

In January 1882, Finnmark was hit by a very strong winter storm which damaged the church. In the summer of 1883, a large renovation was started on the church to repair the damage from the storm and improve the building. During this renovation, the church was painted white on the exterior.

During the war years of 1944–1945, the church was used as a German command center, quarters for Norwegian forces, and a makeshift accommodation for civilians. It was not burned like most of the other Finnmark churches.

== Media gallery ==
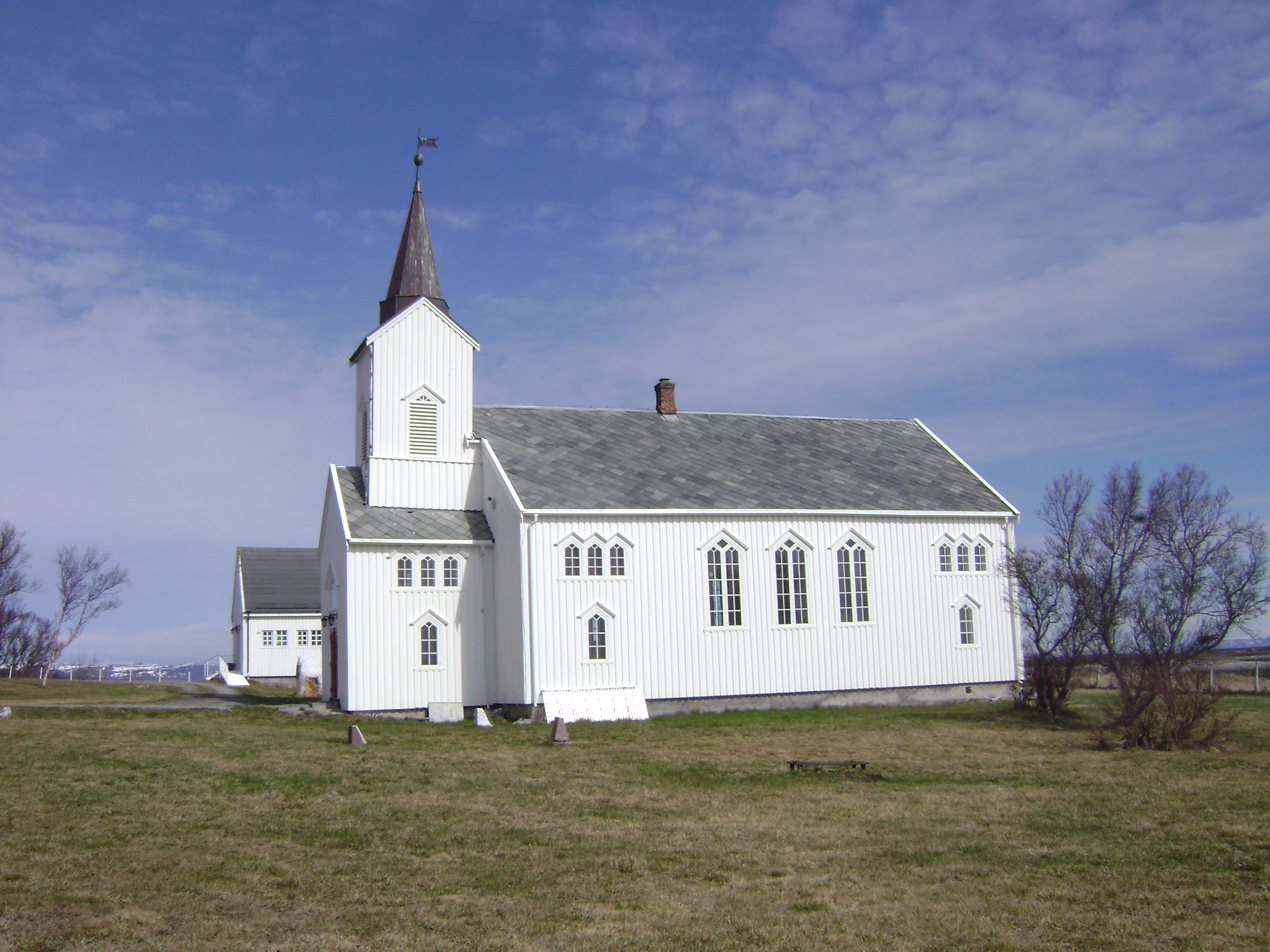

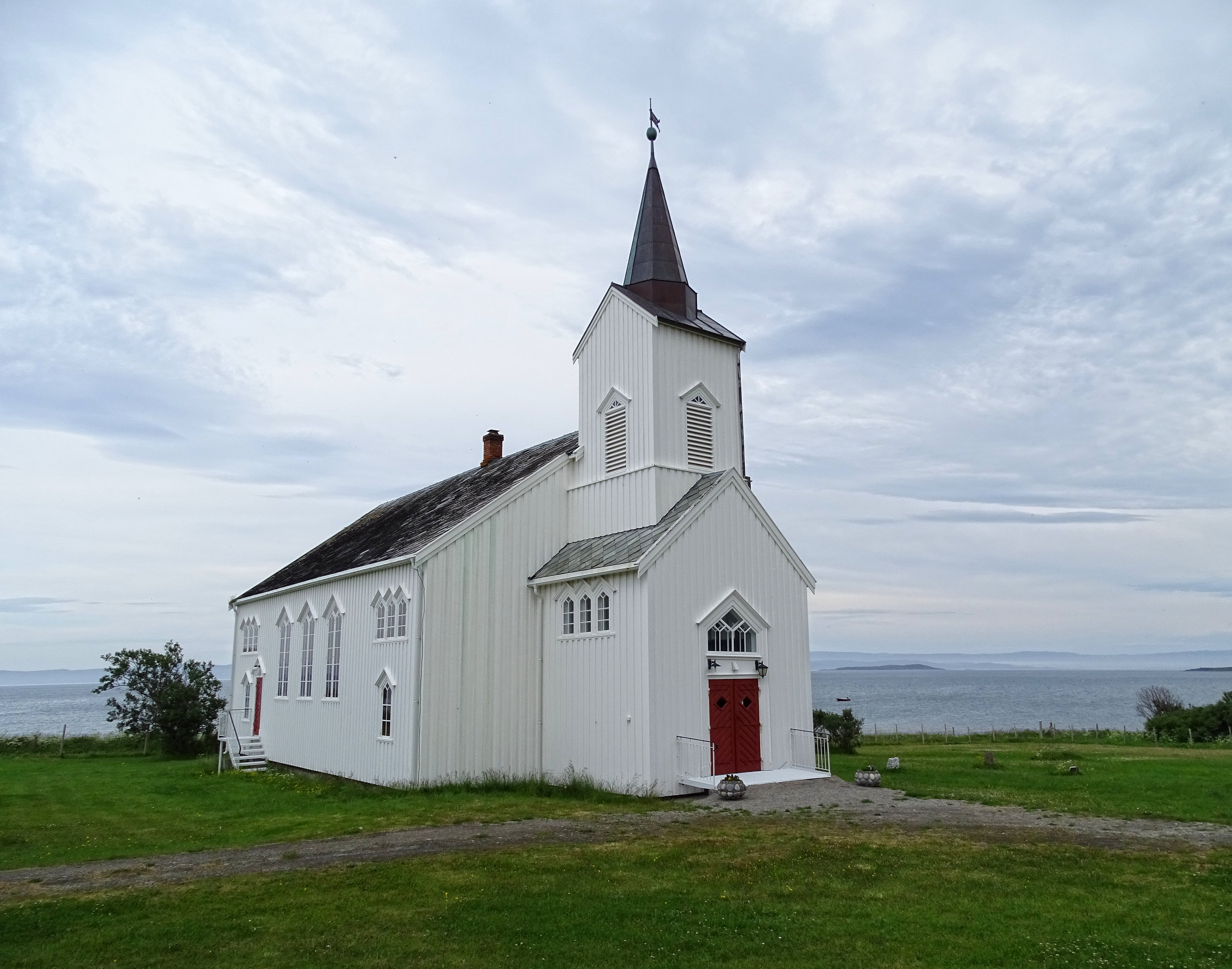

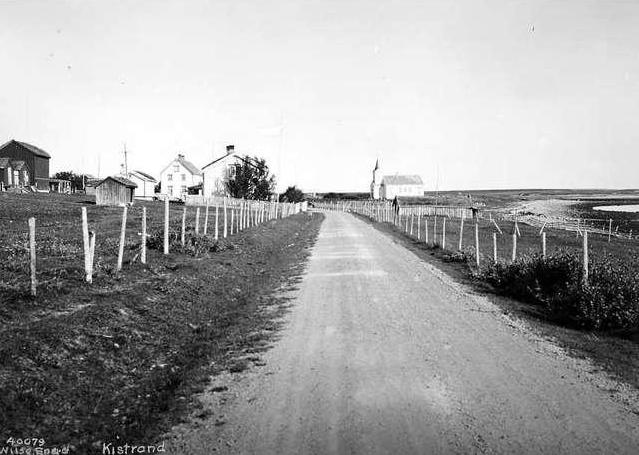

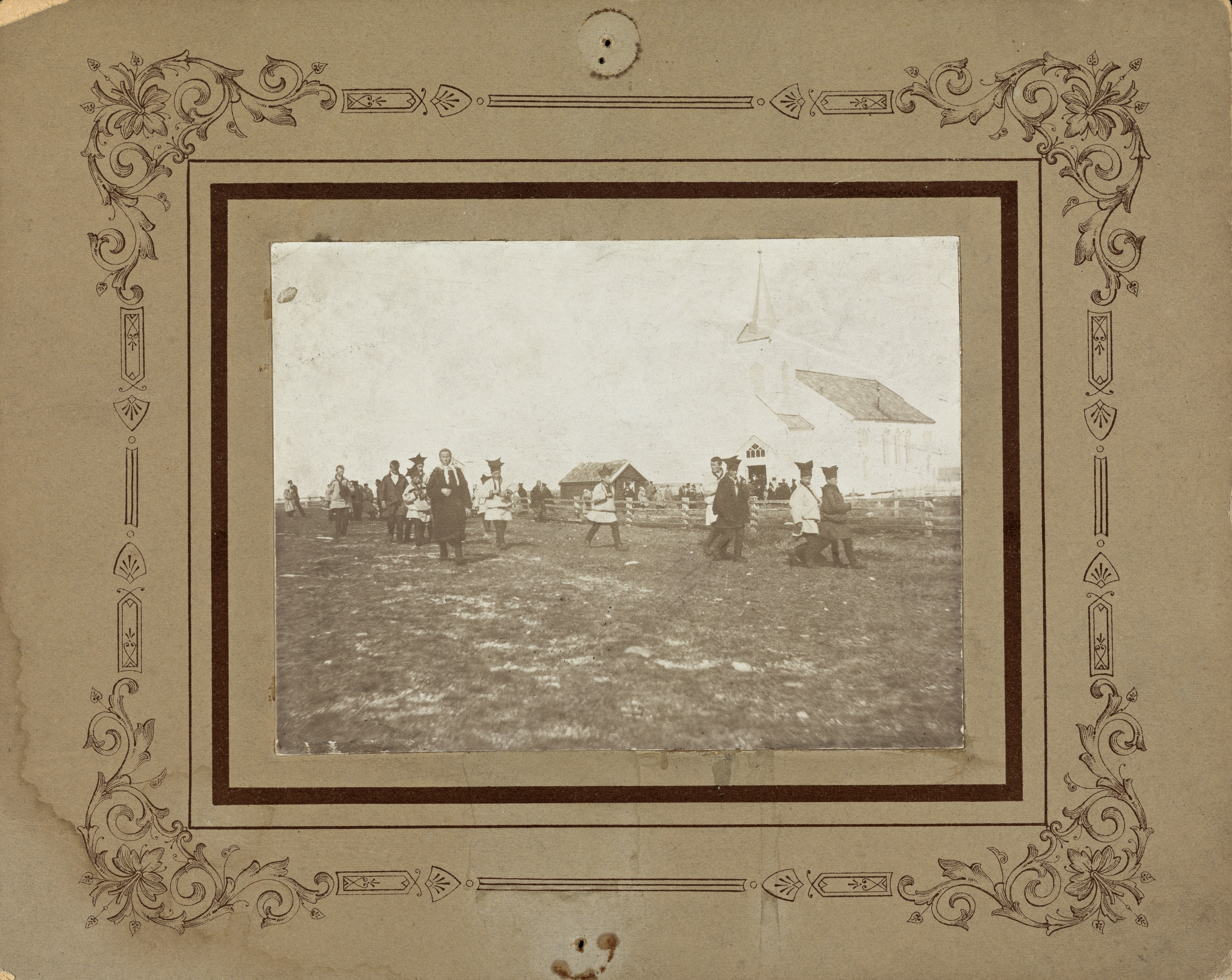

== See also ==
- List of churches in Nord-Hålogaland
