= Porsanger Peninsula =

Peninsula in Finnmark, Norway

Porsanger Peninsula Porsangerhalvøya
- Peninsula
- Interactive map of the lake
- Coordinates: 70.7560°N 25.0671°E
- Location: Finnmark, Norway

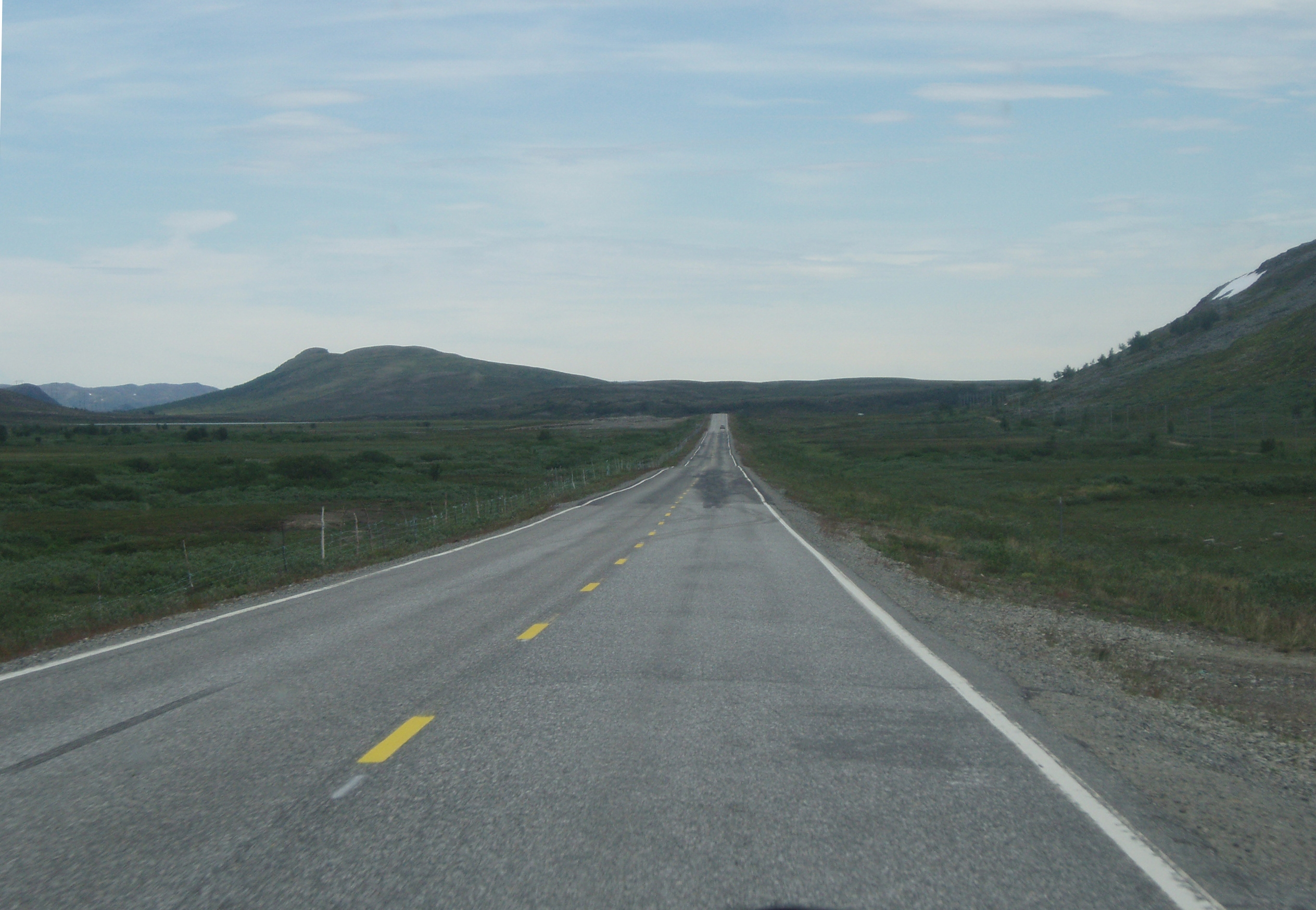

The Porsanger Peninsula (Norwegian: Porsangerhalvøya) is a peninsula in Finnmark county, Norway. The large peninsula sits between the Altafjorden and the Porsangerfjorden and includes parts of the municipalities of Alta, Hammerfest, Måsøy, Nordkapp, and Porsanger. Stabbursdalen National Park lies on the southern end of the peninsula.

The landscape of the Porsanger peninsula consists mainly of a treeless plain, a continuation of the Finnmarksvidda plateau to the south. A number of fjords cut into the peninsula, of which the largest are the Repparfjorden, Revsbotn, and Snefjorden from the west and the Kobbefjorden from the north. The European route E06 highway runs north through the peninsula.
