= Gjesvær Chapel =

- Gjesvær kapell
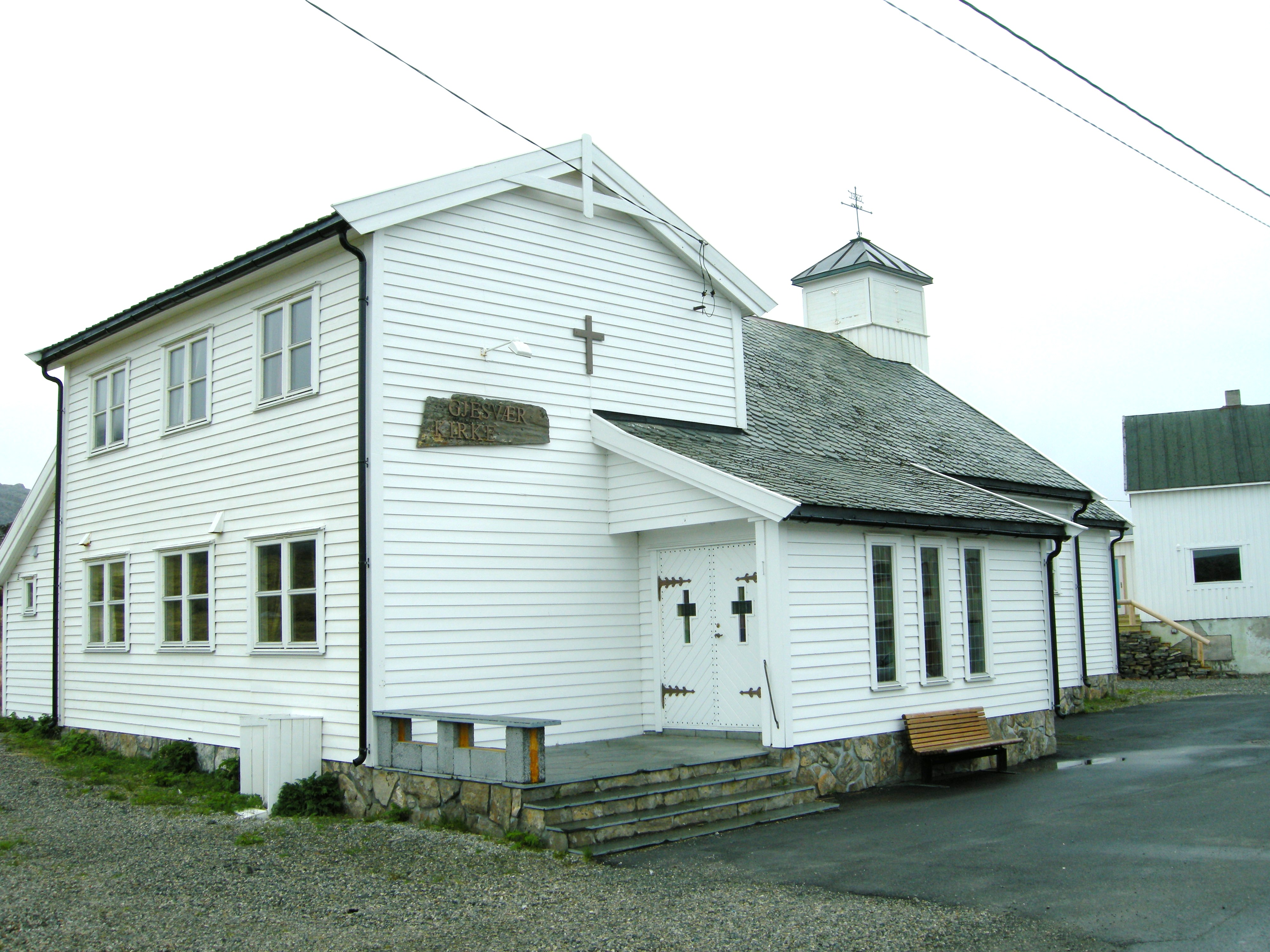
- View of the chapel
- Gjesvær Chapel
- 71.098647°N 25.382072°E
- Location: Nordkapp Municipality, Finnmark
- Country: Norway
- Denomination: Church of Norway
- Churchmanship: Evangelical Lutheran

History
- Status: Chapel
- Founded: 1960
- Consecrated: 1960

Architecture
- Functional status: Active
- Architectural type: Long church
- Completed: 1960 (66 years ago)

Specifications
- Capacity: 70
- Materials: Wood

Administration
- Diocese: Nord-Hålogaland
- Deanery: Hammerfest prosti
- Parish: Nordkapp
- Norwegian Cultural Heritage Site
- Type: Church
- Status: Not protected
- ID: 84260

Gjesvær Chapel (Norwegian: Gjesvær kapell) is a chapel of the Church of Norway in Nordkapp Municipality in Finnmark county, Norway. It is located in the village of Gjesvær on the western end of the island of Magerøya. It is an annex chapel for the Nordkapp parish which is part of the Hammerfest prosti (deanery) in the Diocese of Nord-Hålogaland. The white, wooden chapel was built in a long church style in 1960 and it is privately owned. The church seats about 70 people.

The church is registered in the Norwegian cultural heritage monument database.

== Media gallery ==
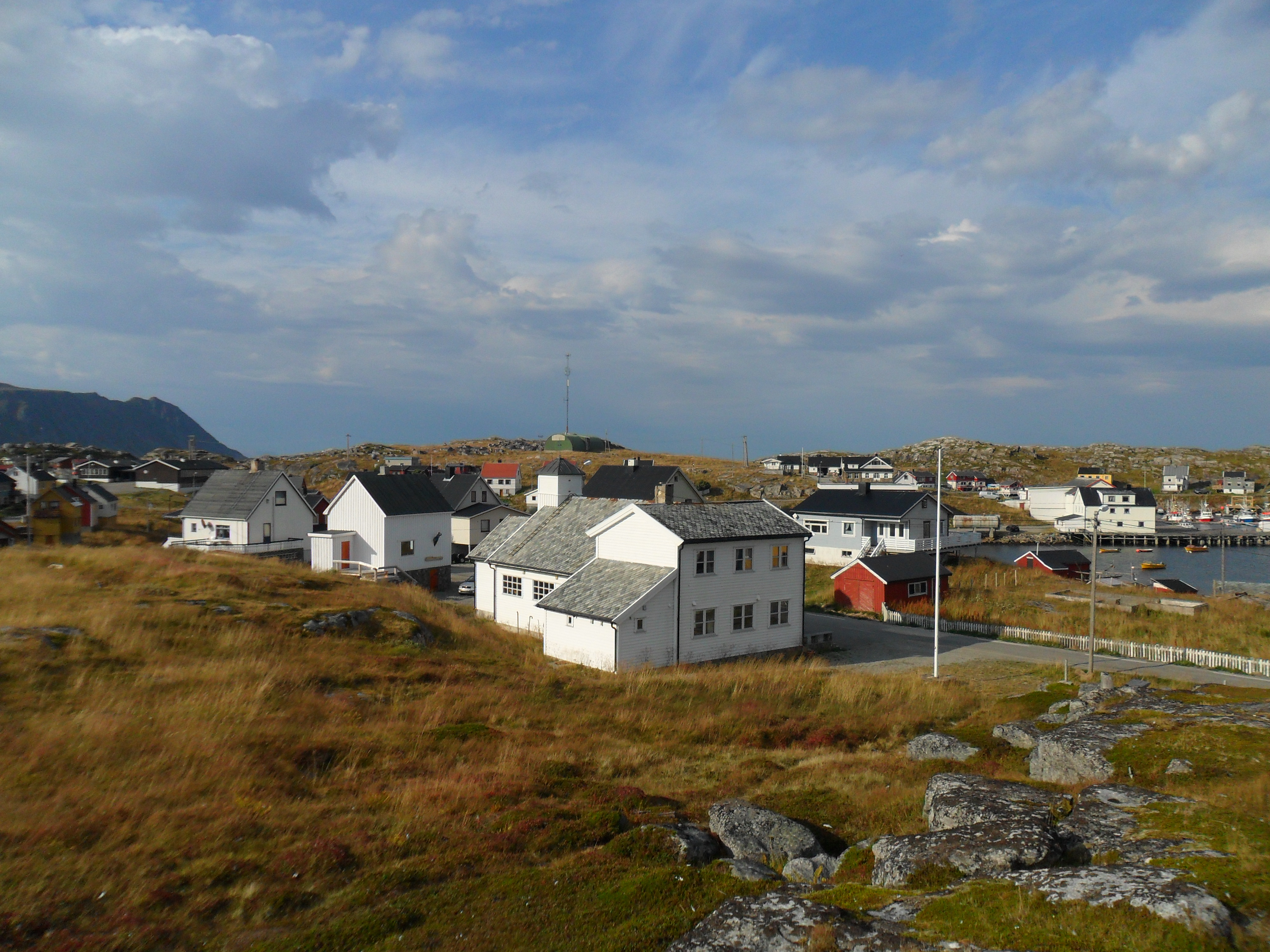

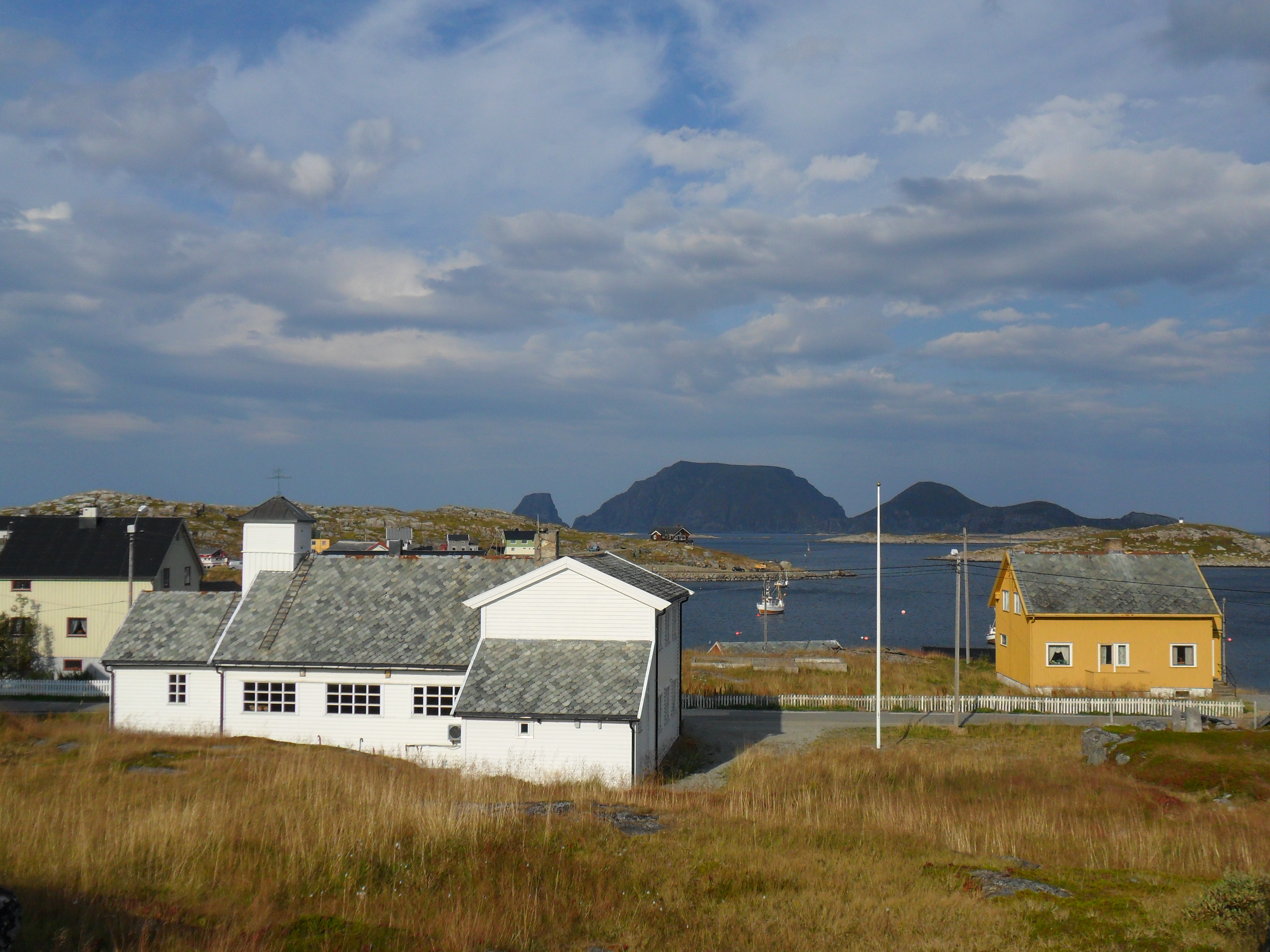

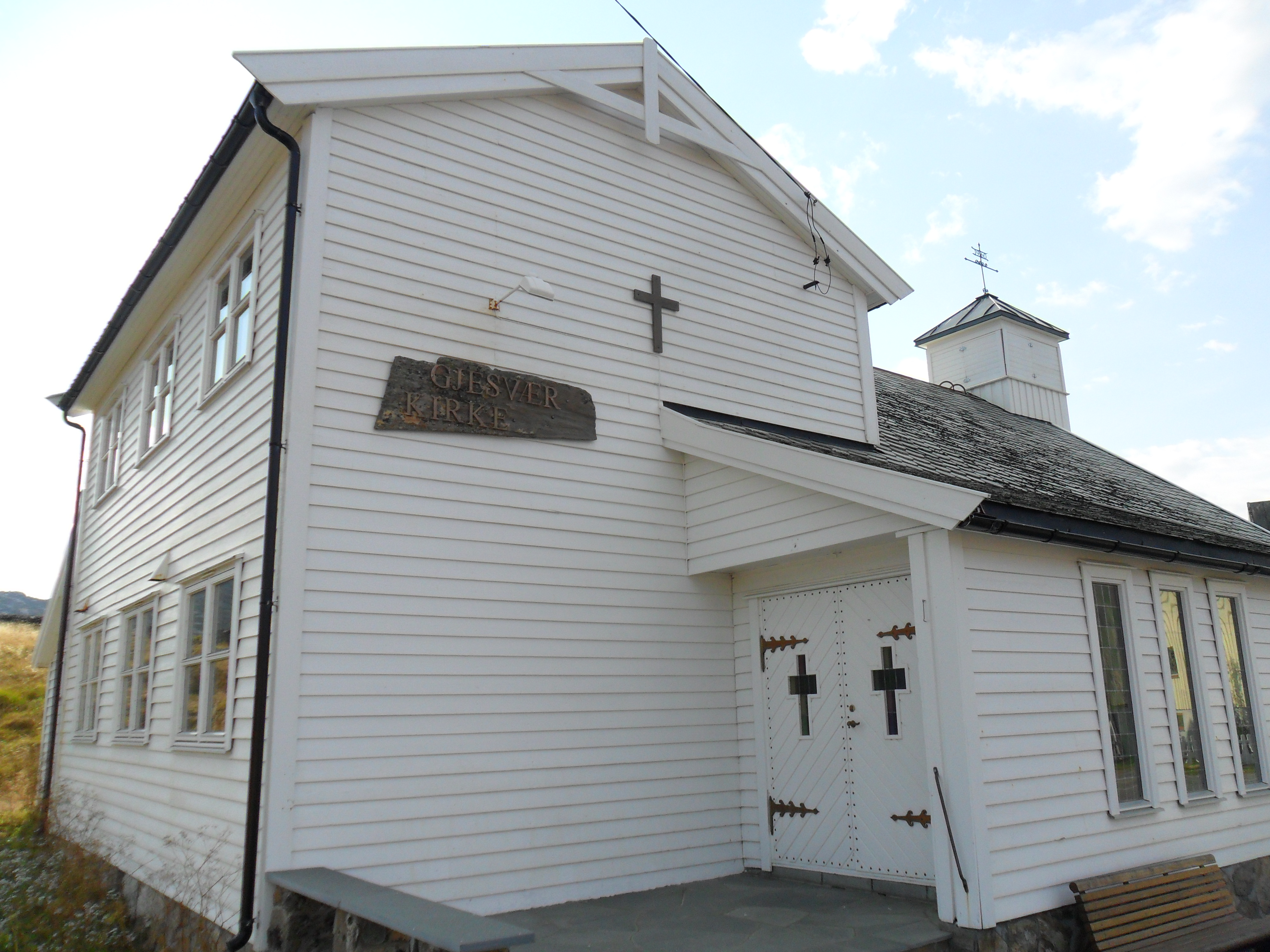

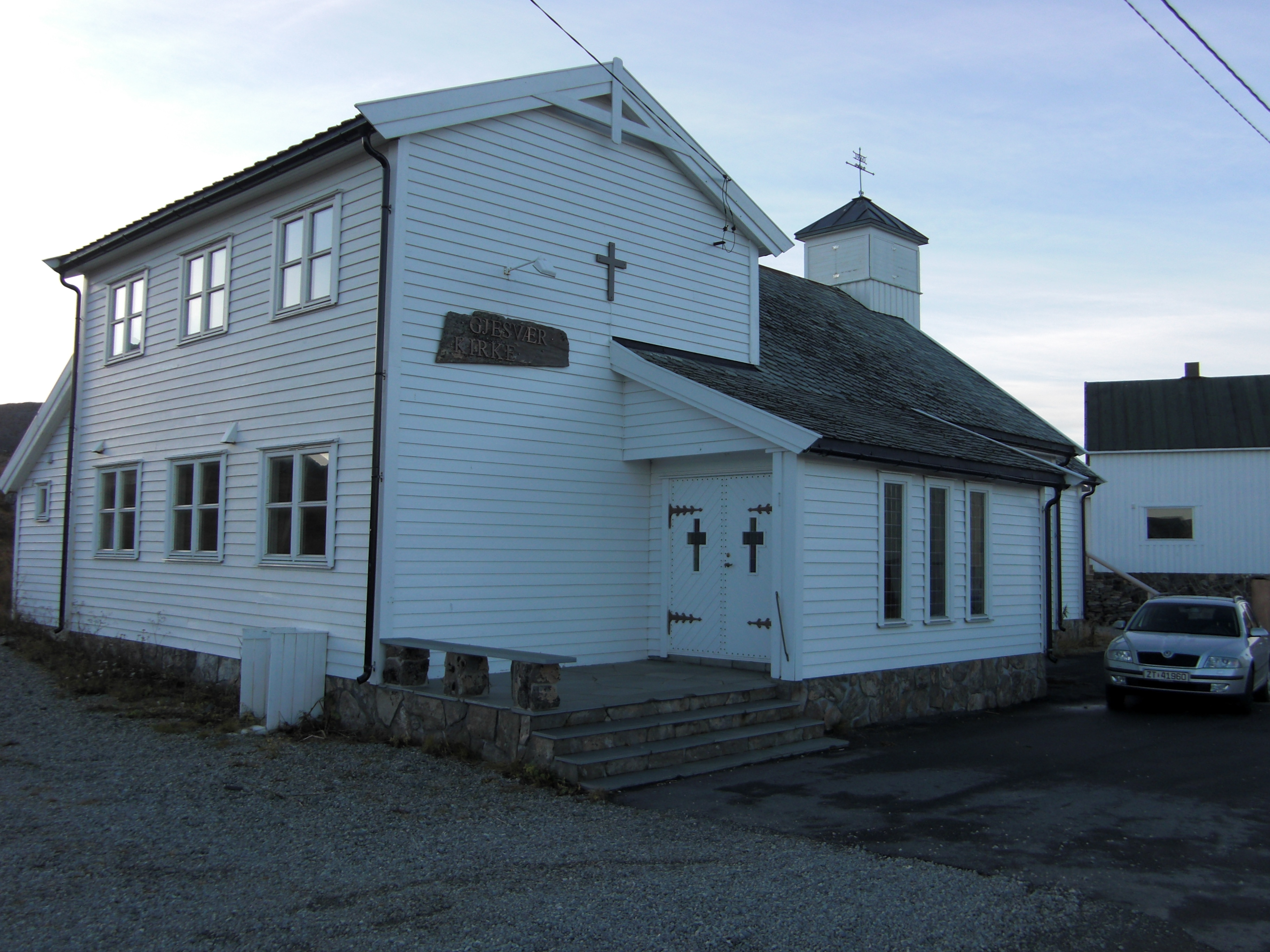

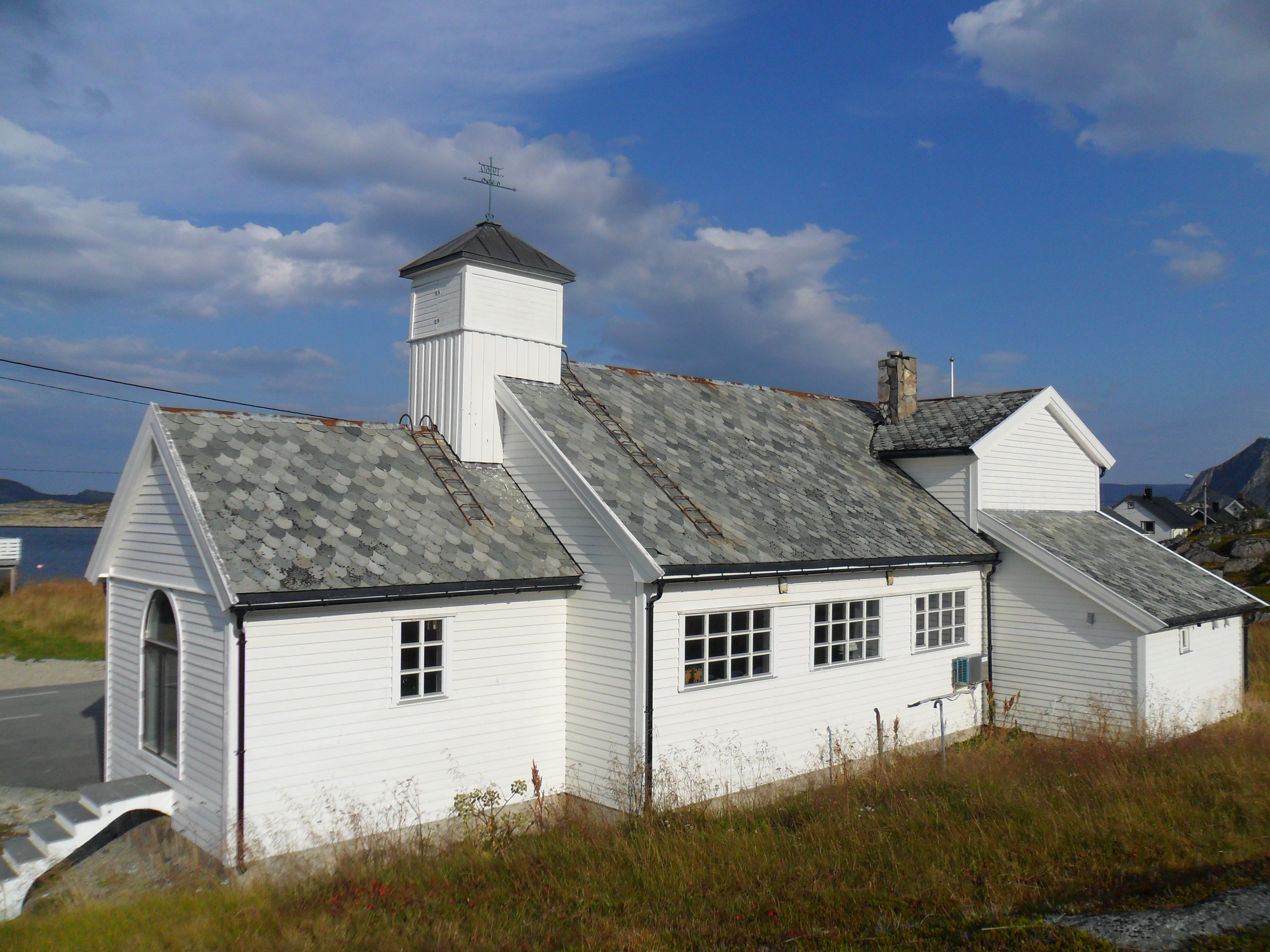

== See also ==
- List of churches in Nord-Hålogaland
