= Gjesvær =

Gjesvær Gjesvær (Norwegian) Geaissvearra (Northern Sami)
- Village
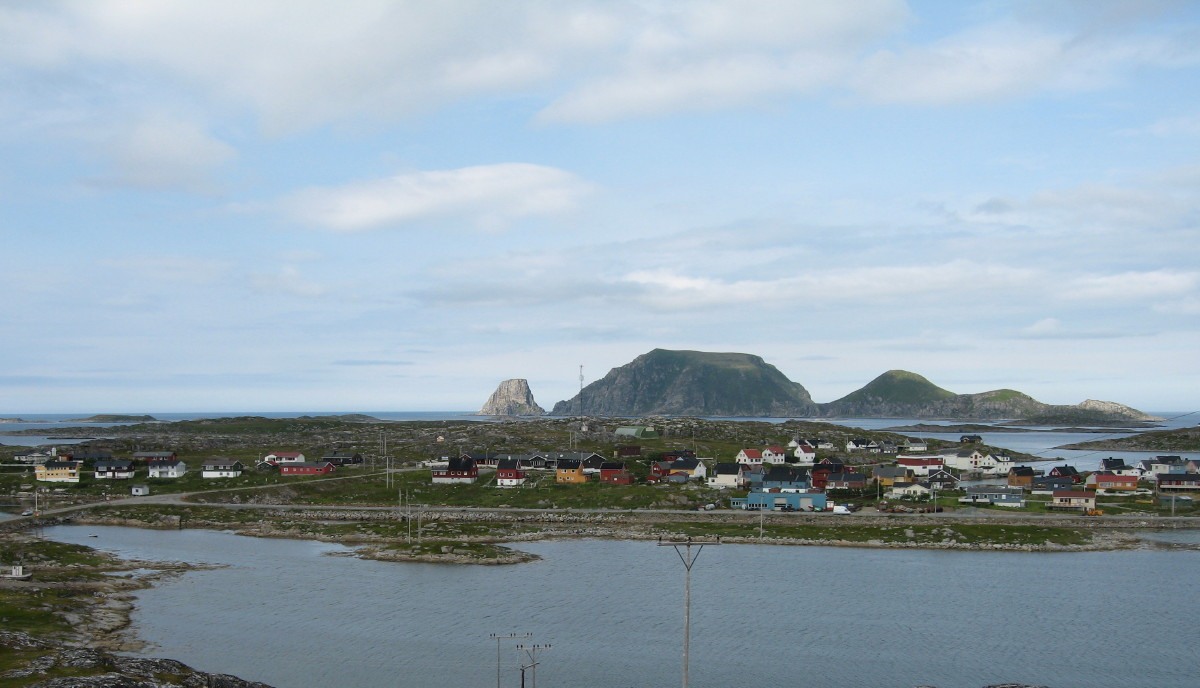
- View of the village
- Interactive map of Gjesvær
- Location within Finnmark Location within Norway
- Coordinates: 71°05′53″N 25°22′34″E
- Country: Norway
- Region: Northern Norway
- County: Finnmark
- District: Vest-Finnmark
- Municipality: Nordkapp Municipality
- Elevation: 4 m (13 ft)

Population
  - Total: 130
- Time zone: UTC+01:00 (CET)
  - Summer (DST): UTC+02:00 (CEST)
- Post Code: 9765 Gjesvær

Gjesvær (Norwegian) or Geaissvearra (Northern Sami) is an old fishing village in Nordkapp Municipality in Finnmark county, Norway. It is the only place in Finnmark known from the Viking Age and is mentioned in the Heimskringla saga as Geirsver. The name comes from the name of a bird called geirfugl.

== History ==
The location was used by Vikings on the way to Bjarmaland (see Ottar from Hålogaland), and probably also for gathering food on the nearby Gjesværstappan islands which contain one of the largest seabird colonies in Norway.

Like most other places in Finnmark, all buildings in the village were burned down in 1944 by the German occupying forces. Gjesvær Chapel, built in 1960, is considered a cultural monument.

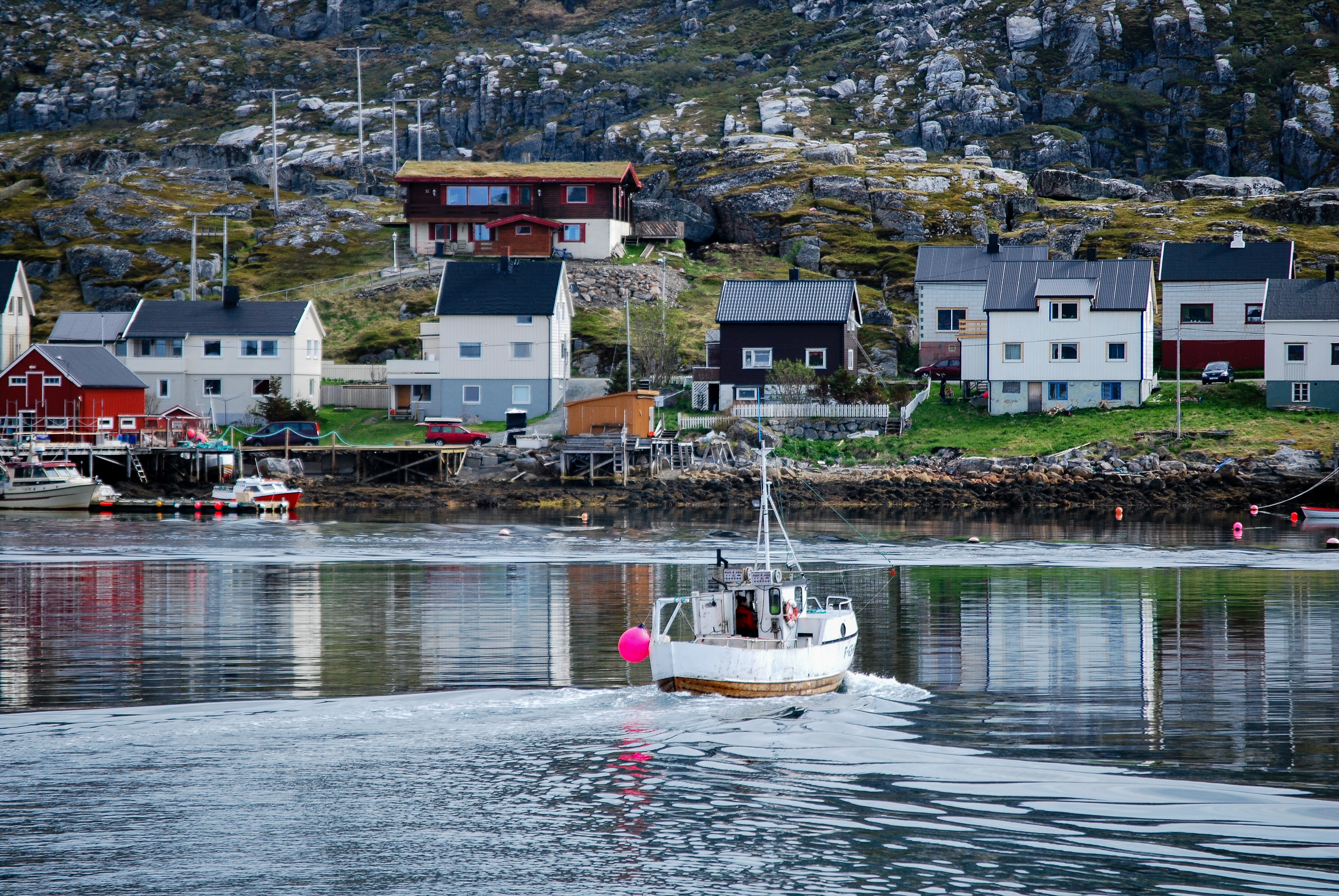
Norwegian fishing village of Gjesvær.

Gjesvær now has approximately 100 inhabitants, but at the beginning of the 1970s, it had about 350 people. It has a fish processing plant, local shop, post office, and primary school. The main industry is fishing, but in recent years there has been increased emphasis on tourism, activities including fishing and bird watching trips to the Gjesværstappan nature reserve.

Gjesvær was historically a part of Måsøy Municipality, along with the sparsely populated western part of Magerøya island. There were no road connections across the island, so residents traveled by boat whenever they left the village and by boat, they are closer to Måsøy. In 1977, the 22-mile (35 km) long Norwegian County Road 156 was completed, connecting Gjesvær by a causeway to Magerøya island and then continuing on to Honningsvåg. For this reason, the municipal boundary was moved. On 1 January 1984, Gjesvær and the western part of Magerøya were transferred from Måsøy municipality to Nordkapp Municipality.
