= Gjesværstappan =

Islands in Norway

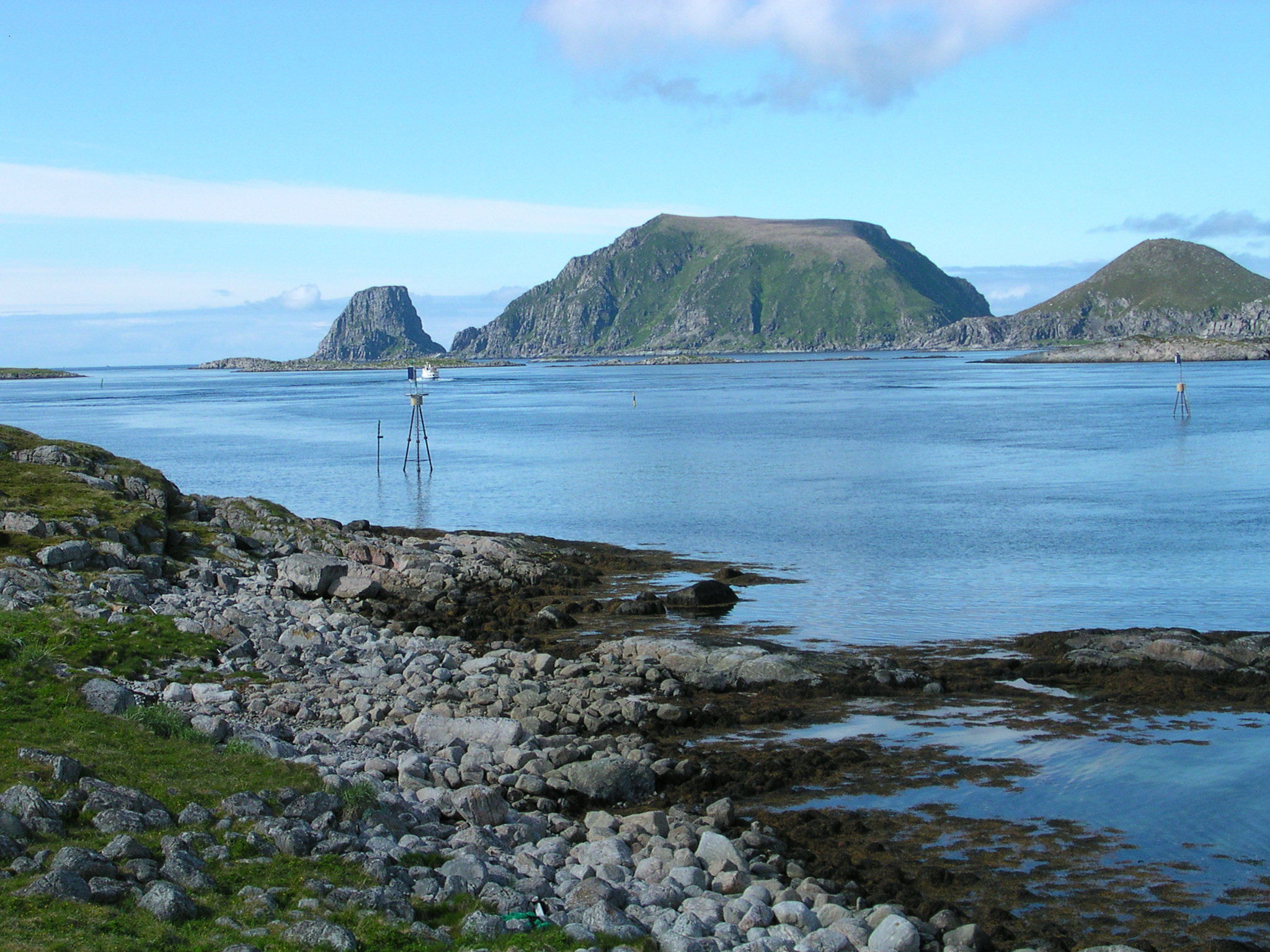
- Gjesværstappan taken from the south: the two peaks of Storstappen are on the left (with the peak of the Stauren peninsula on the extreme left) and Kjerkestappen on the right

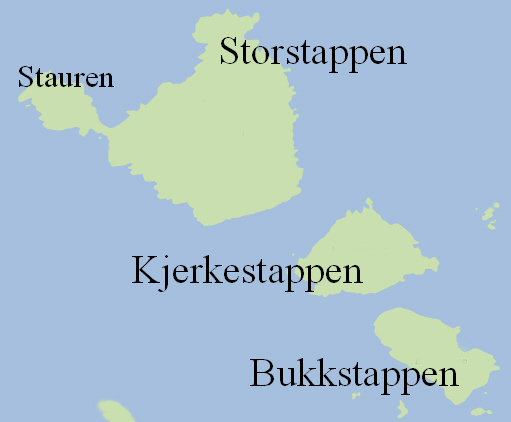

- Location of the island Gjesværstappan (Norway)

Geography
- Location: Finnmark, Norway
- Coordinates: 71.1400°N 25.3366°E
- Major islands: 3
- Area: 1.7 km^{2} (0.66 sq mi)
- Highest elevation: 283 m (928 ft)

Administration
- Norway
- County: Finnmark
- Municipality: Nordkapp Municipality

Demographics
- Population: 0

Gjesværstappan is a group of high, steep-sided, grass-covered islands which are located north of the island village of Gjesvær in Nordkapp Municipality in Finnmark county, Norway. The three main islands are Storstappen, Kjerkestappen, and Bukkstappen.

Storstappan rises to a height of 283 metres (928 ft) above sea level and has a peninsula called Stauren that rises to 165 metres (541 ft). Kjerkestappen rises to an elevation of 166 metres (545 ft) above sea level and Bukkstappen rises to 92 metres (302 ft) above sea level. Historically, there were people that lived on the islands and there was a church on Kjerkestappen.

== Nature reserve ==
The islands contain a large colony of seabirds and have been designated a nature reserve since 1983, as well as being an Important Bird Area (IBA). The land area of the reserve is 1.7 square kilometres (0.66 sq mi), but the reserve also includes 5.5 square kilometres (2.1 sq mi) of the sea surrounding the islands. The largest colonies of cliff-breeding seabirds are mainly located on the bird cliffs of the biggest island, Storstappen, and between June 15 and August 15 visitors are not allowed to set foot on this island.

The colony is regarded as important because of the large numbers of birds. A 1988 survey found 70 pairs of great cormorants, around 50 pairs of European shags, 5000 to 10,000 pairs of black-legged kittiwakes, about 600 pairs of common murres, 25 pairs of thick-billed murres, about 2500 pairs of razorbills and about 50,000 pairs of Atlantic puffins. The 1988 survey also found northern gannet nests.

== Media gallery ==
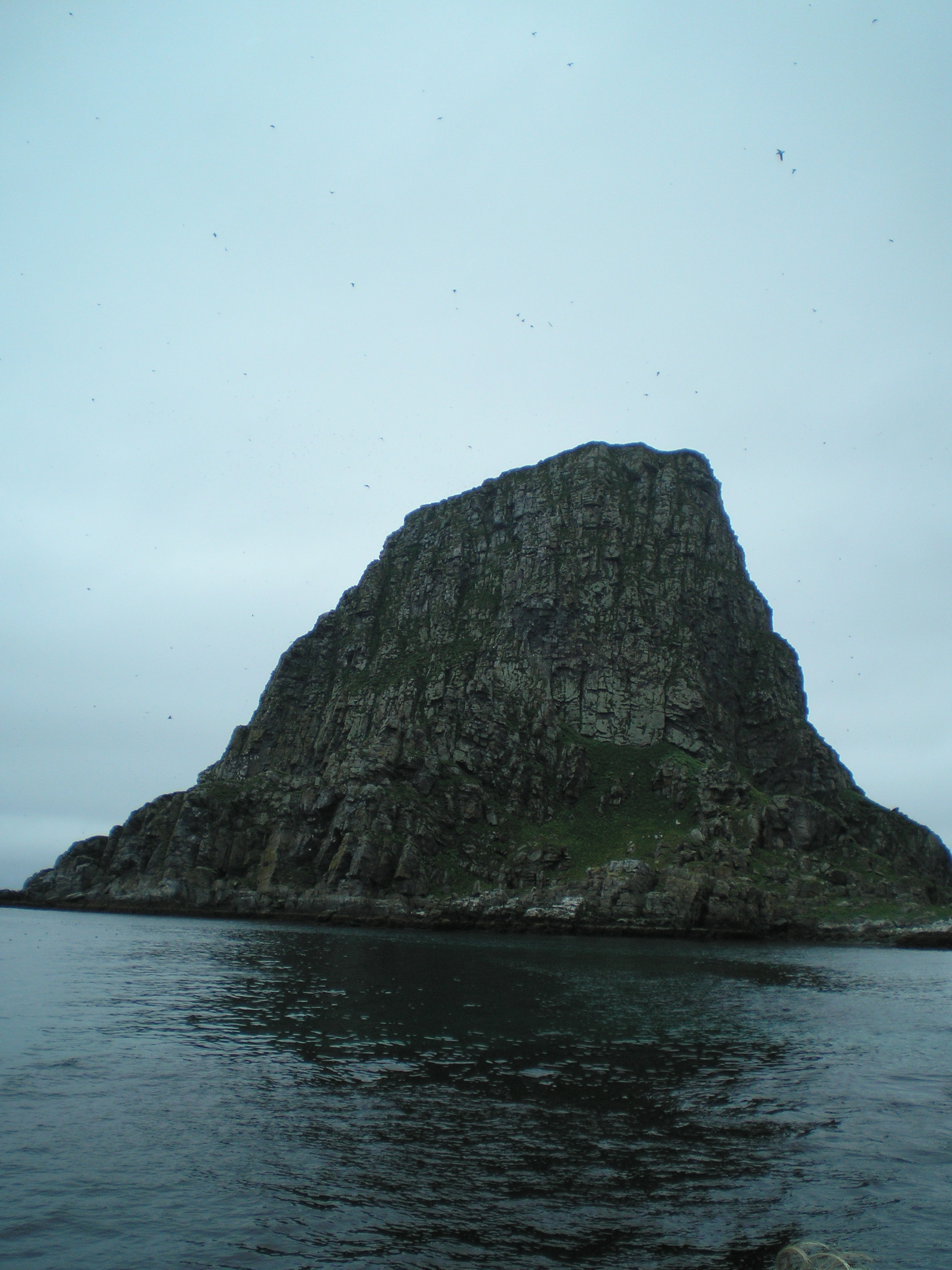
Stauren

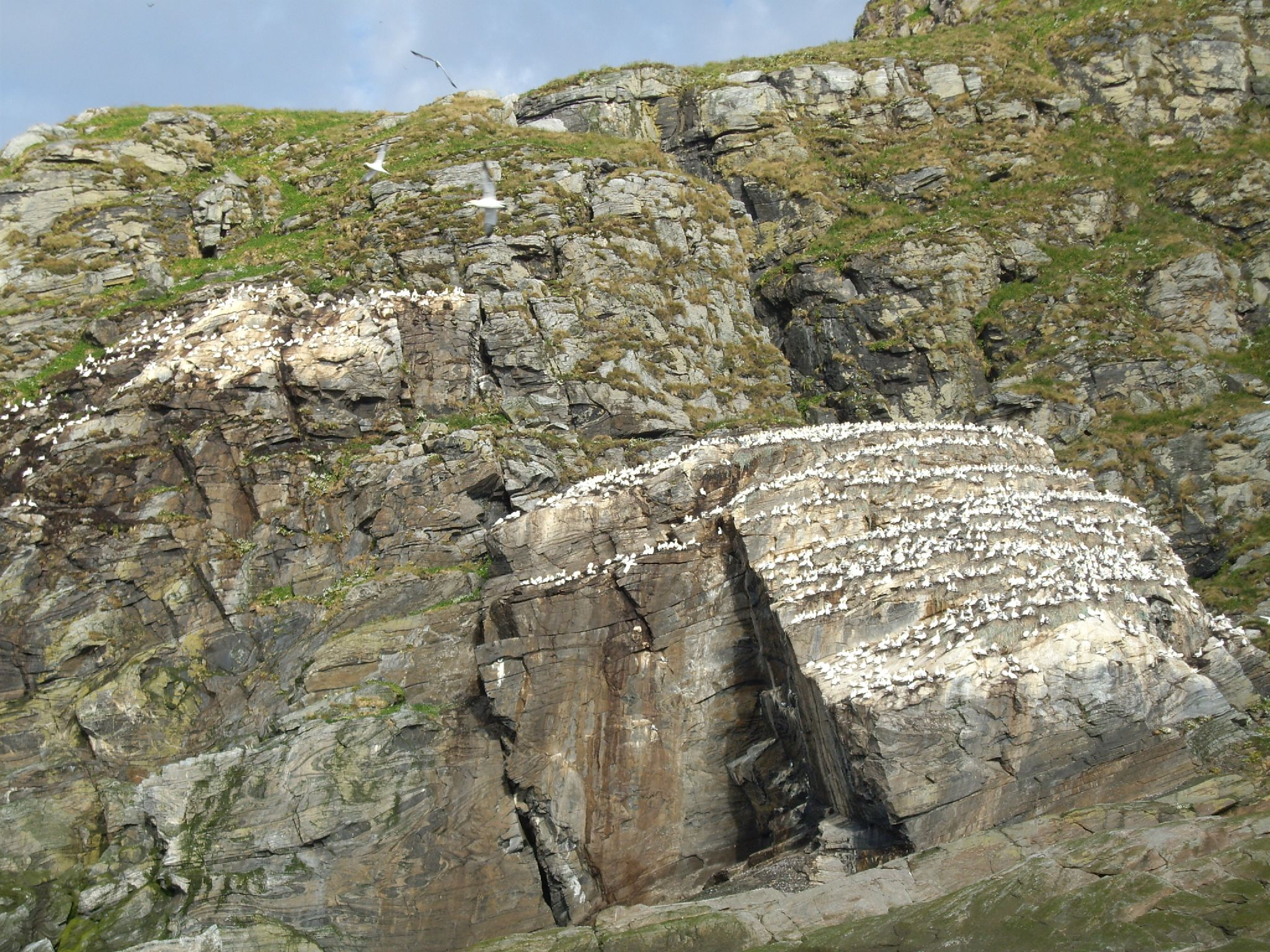
Nesting on Gjesvaerstappan

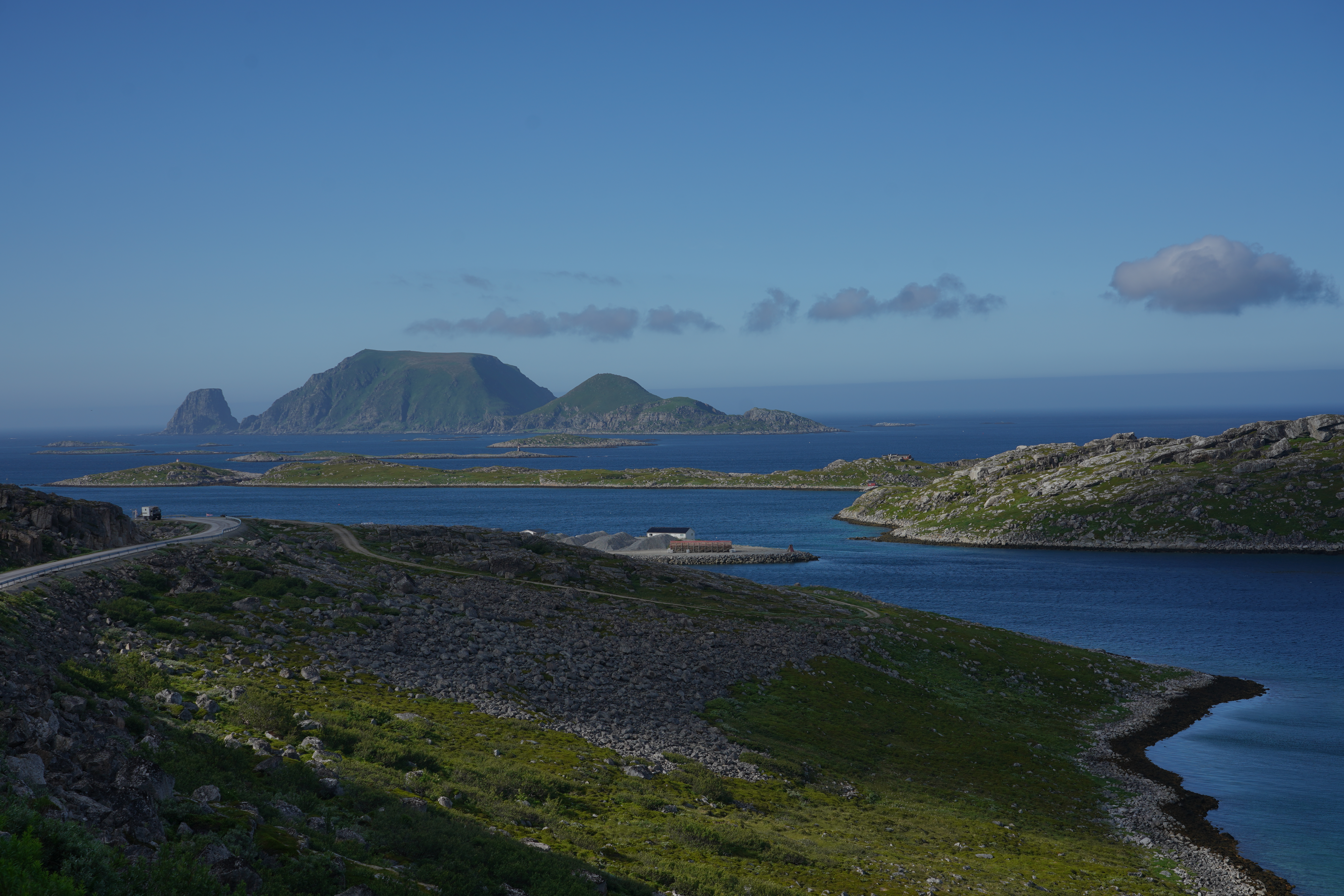
Gjesvaerstappan viewed from Gjesvær

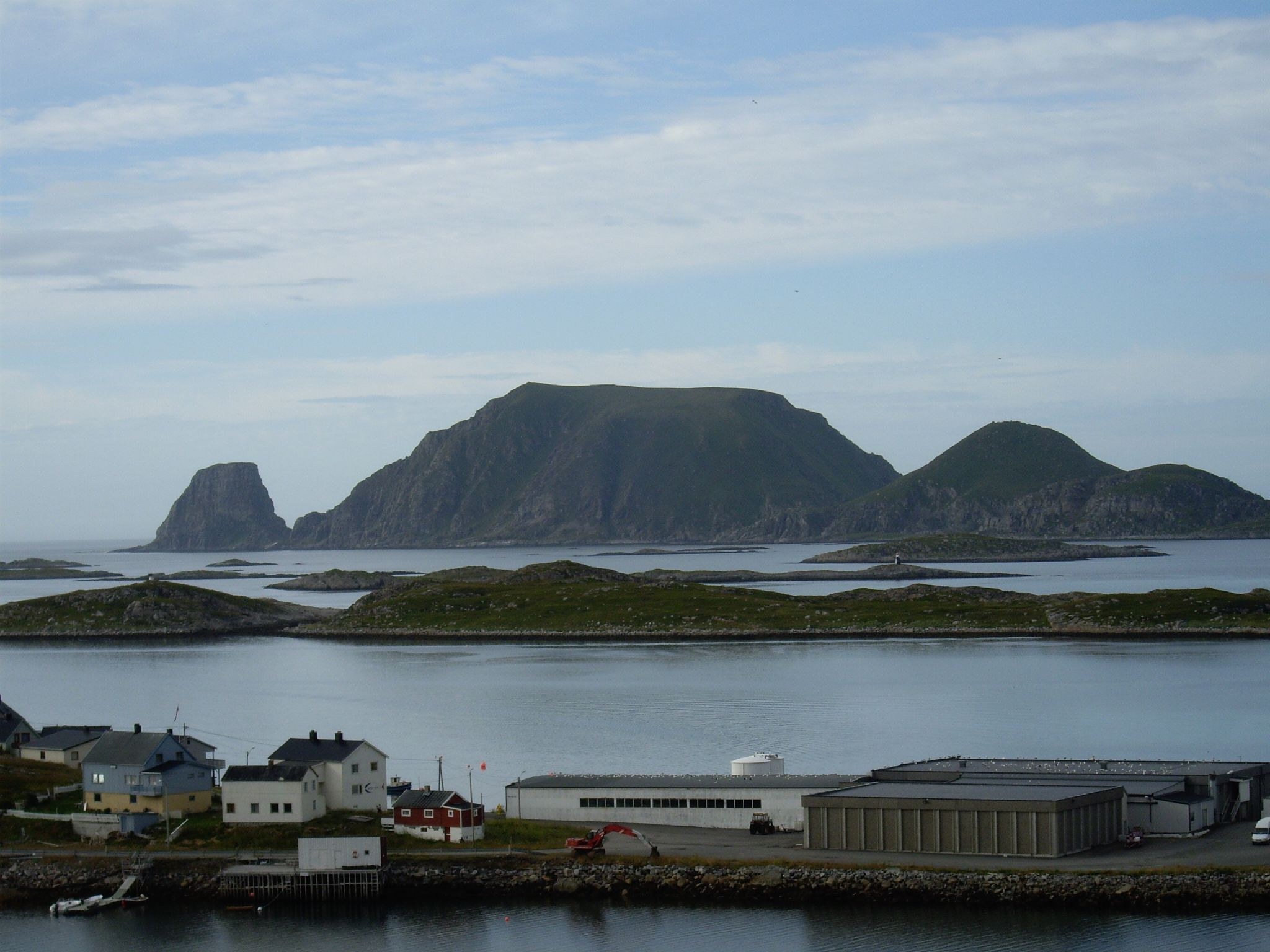
Gjesvaerstappan viewed from Gjesvær

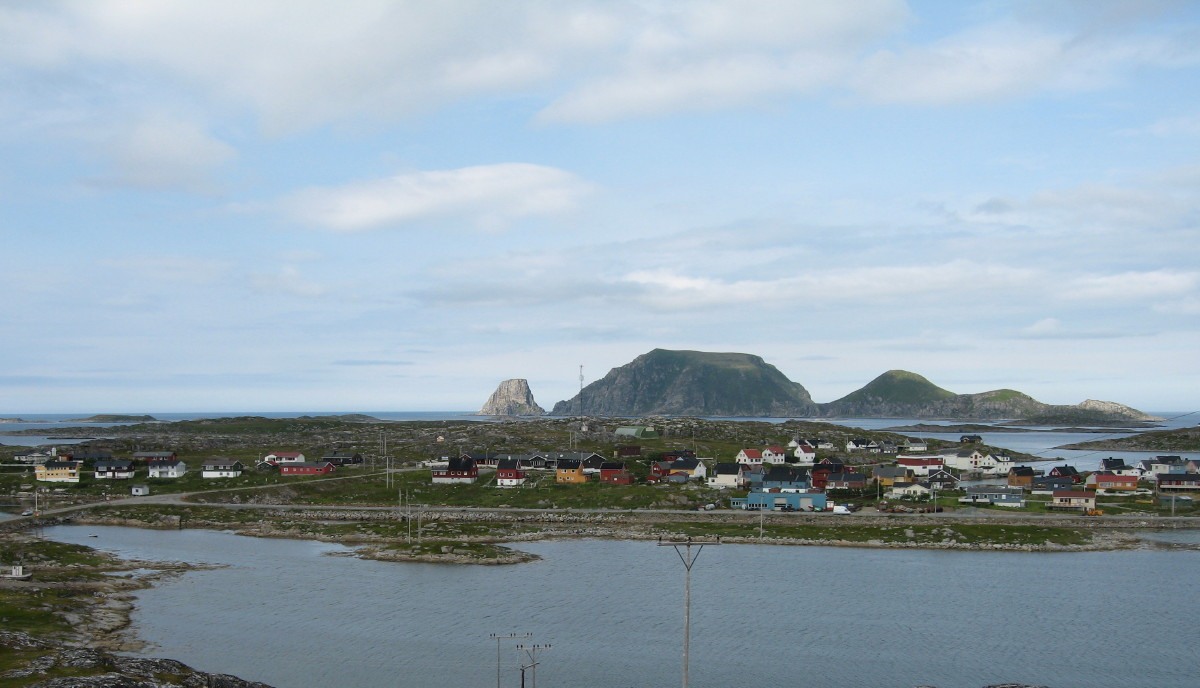
Gjesvaerstappan viewed from Gjesvær

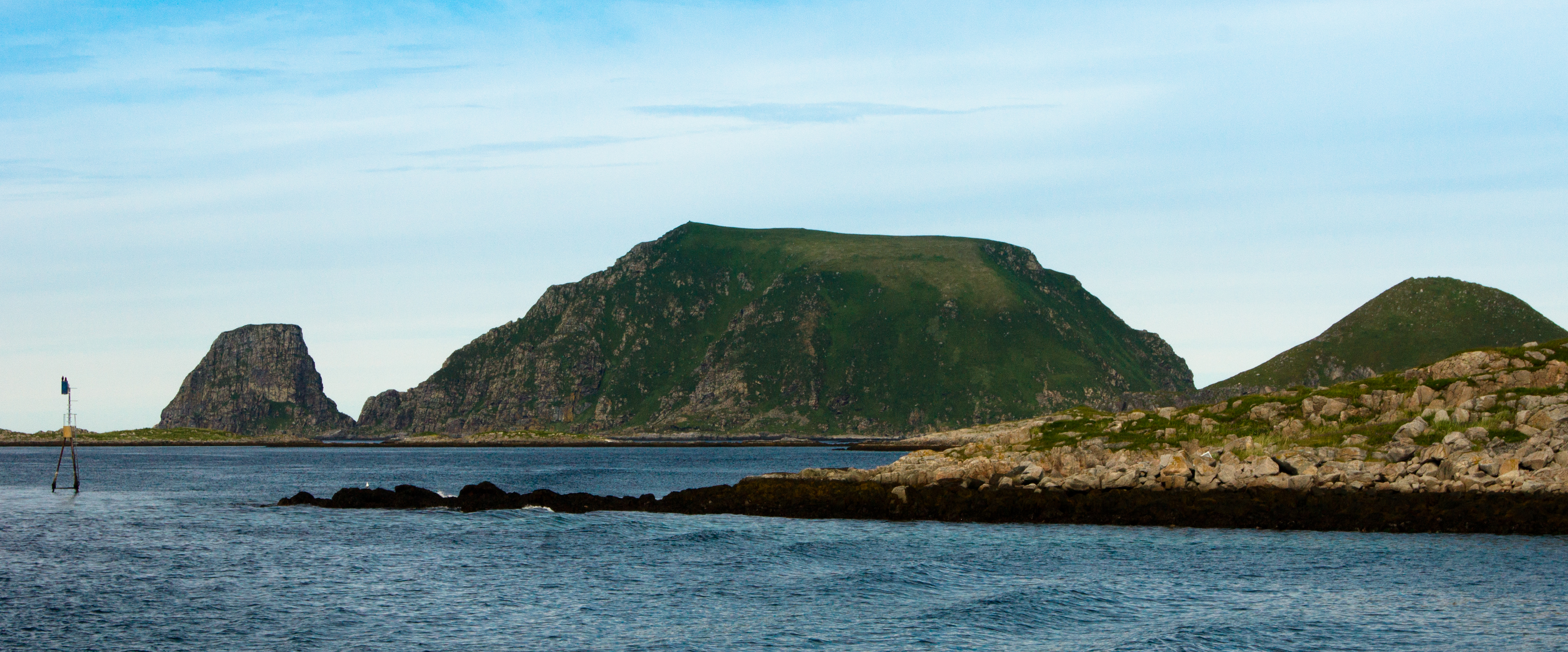
Gjesvaerstappan viewed from the south

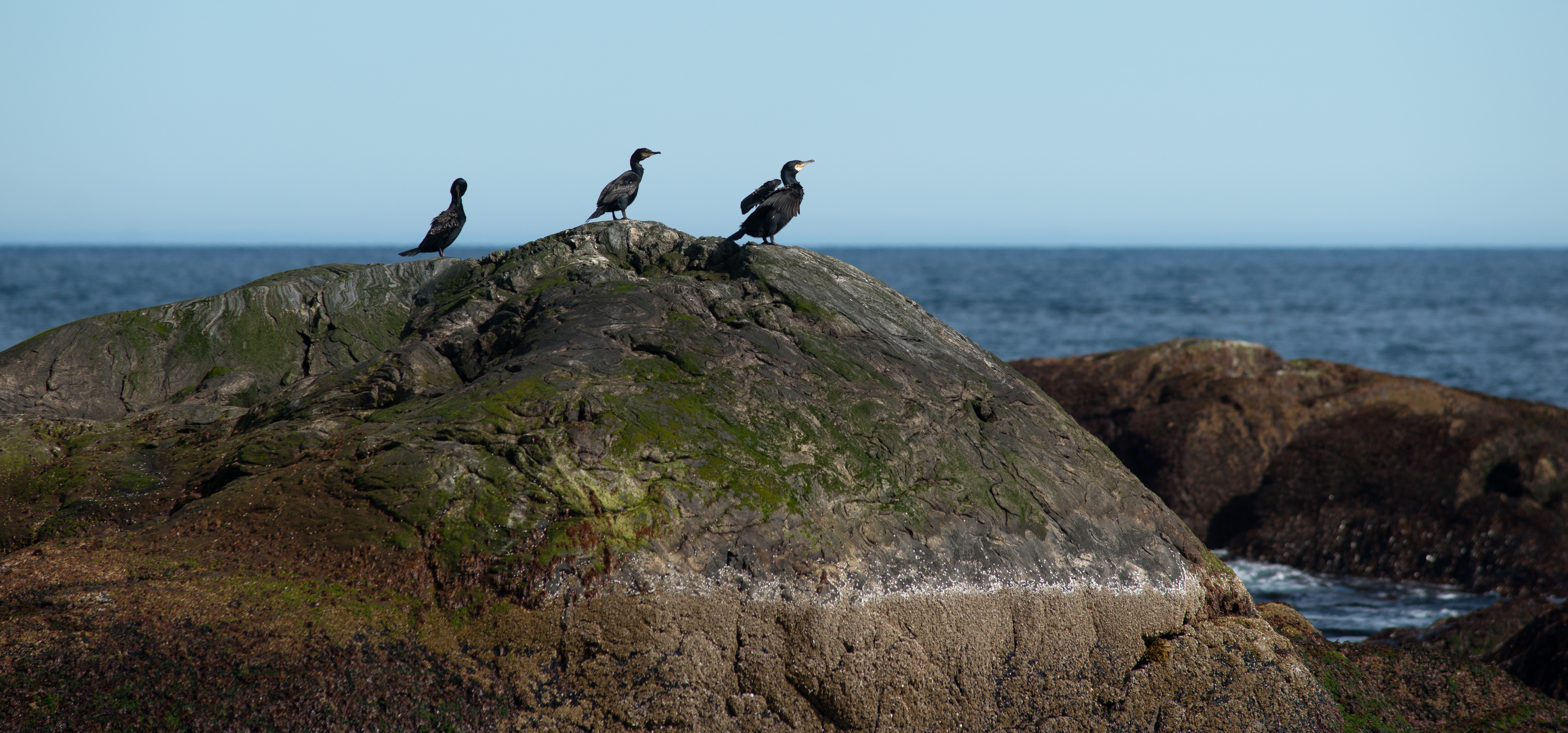
Gjesvaerstappan

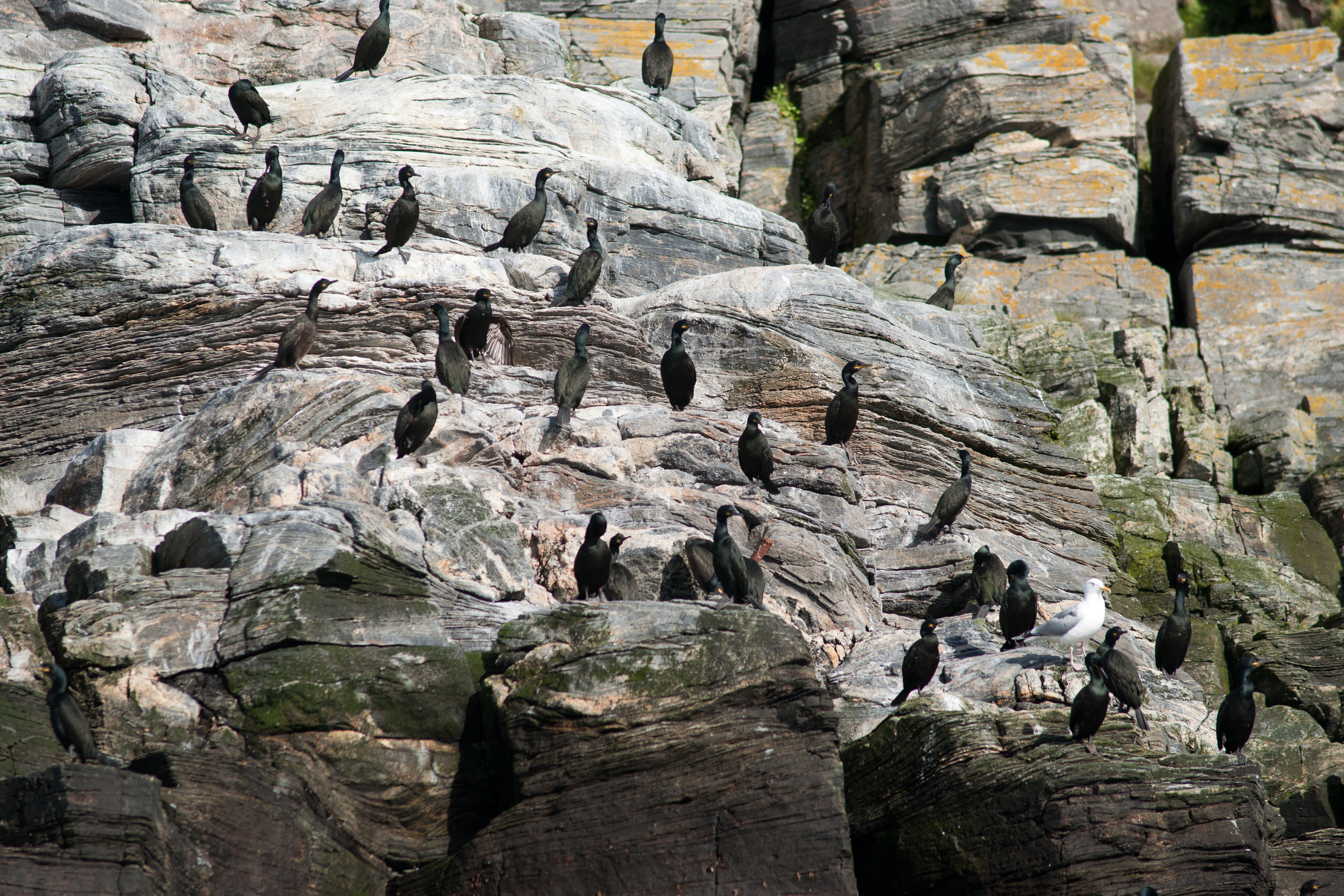
Gjesvaerstappan

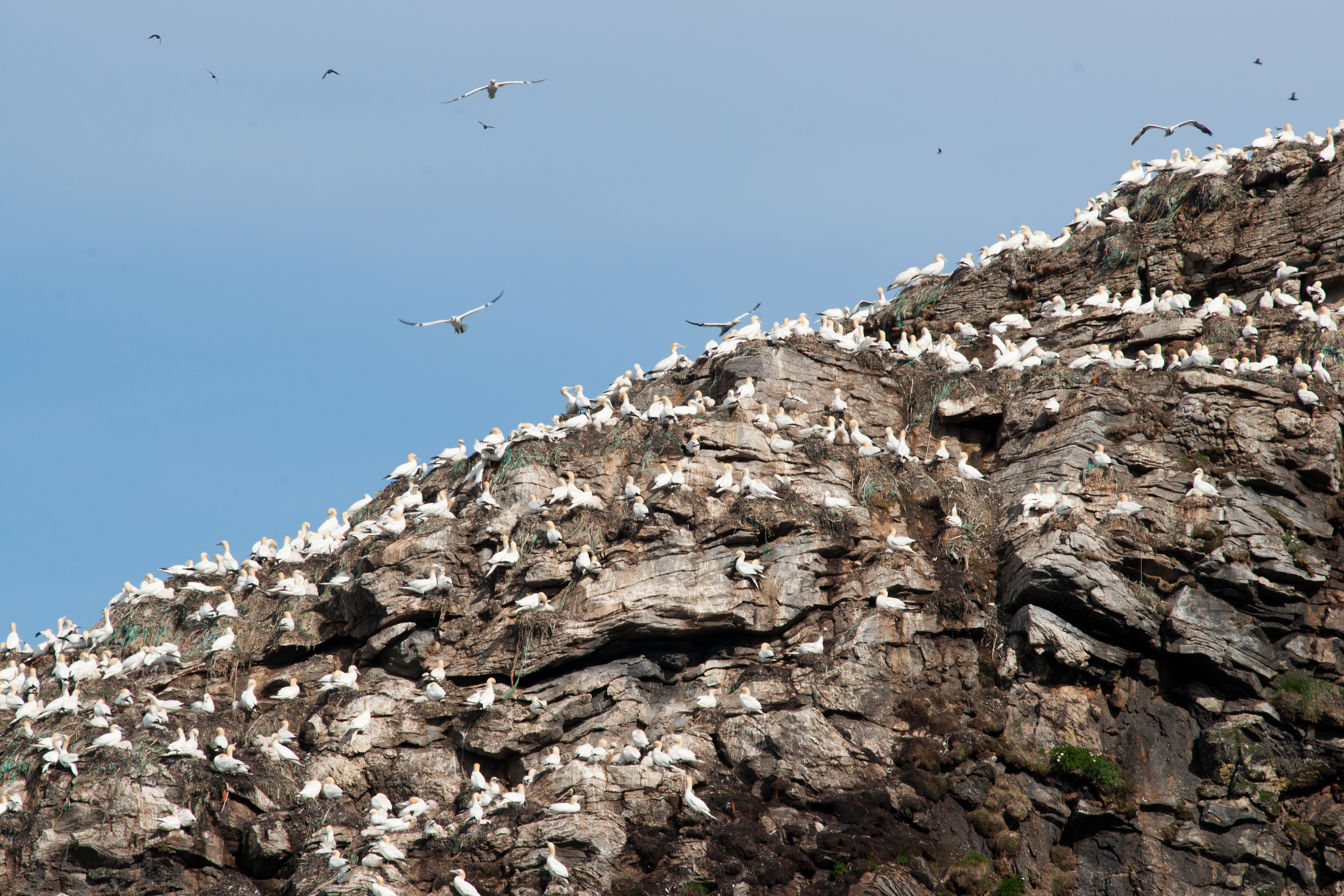
Gjesvaerstappan

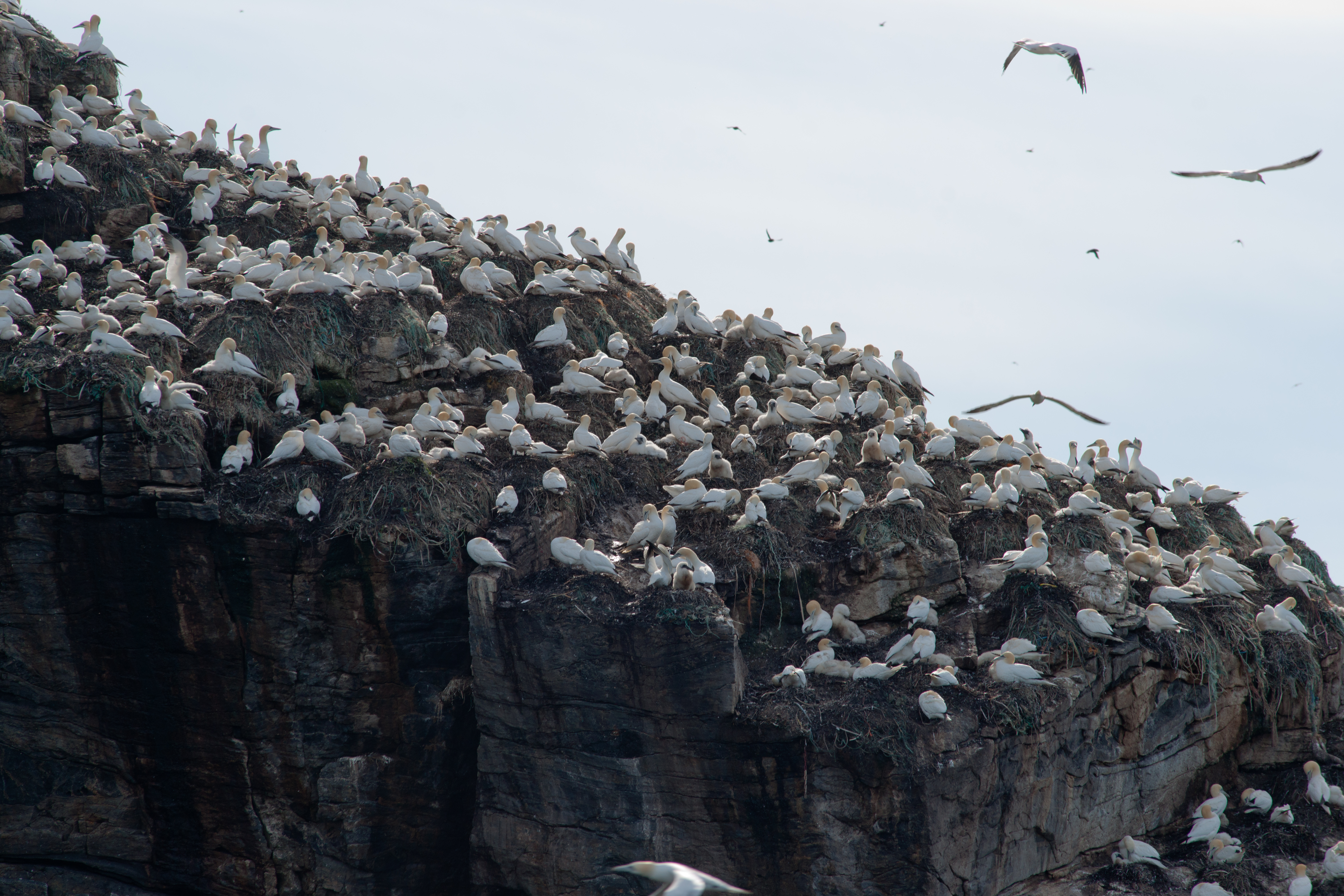
Gjesvaerstappan

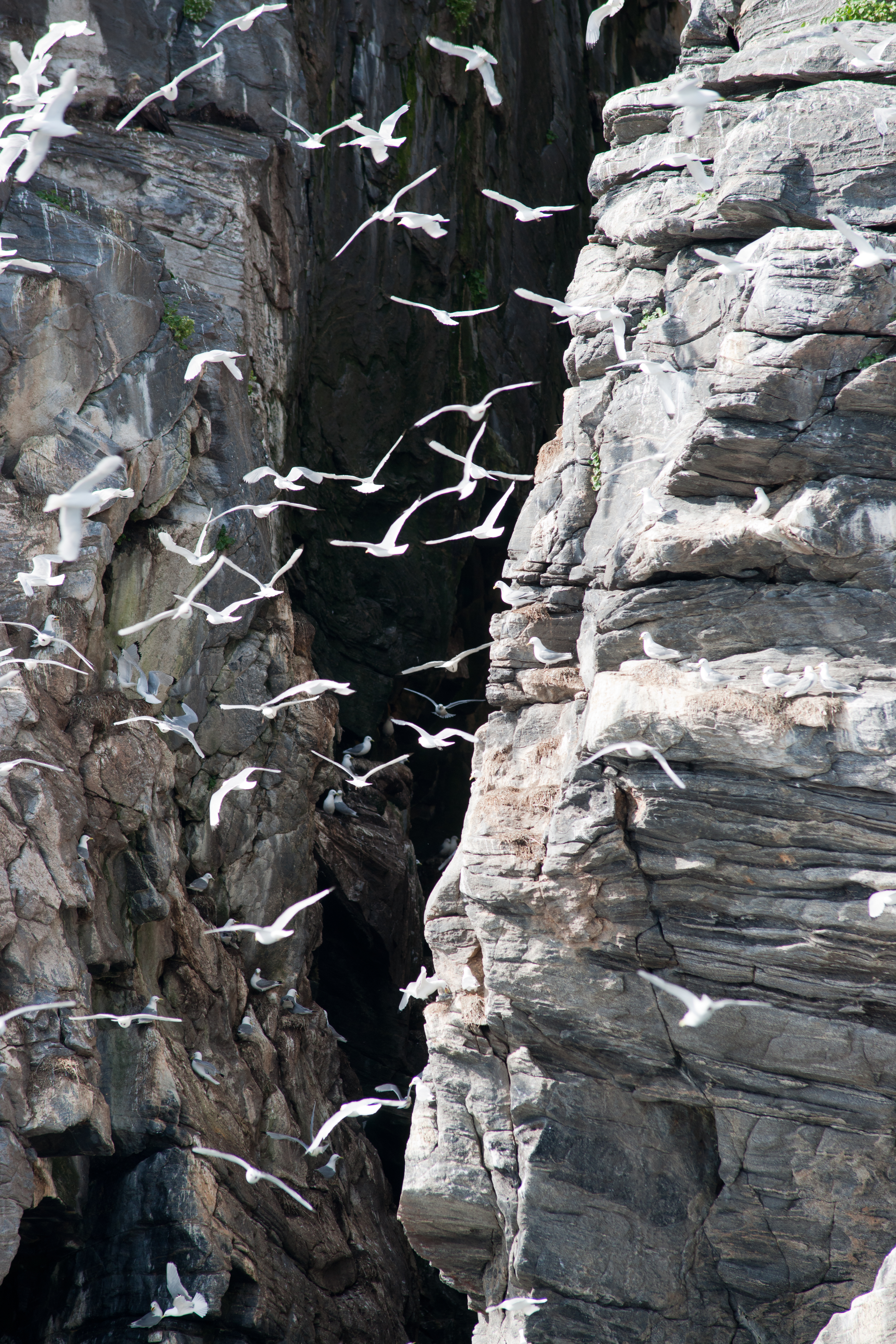
Gjesvaerstappan

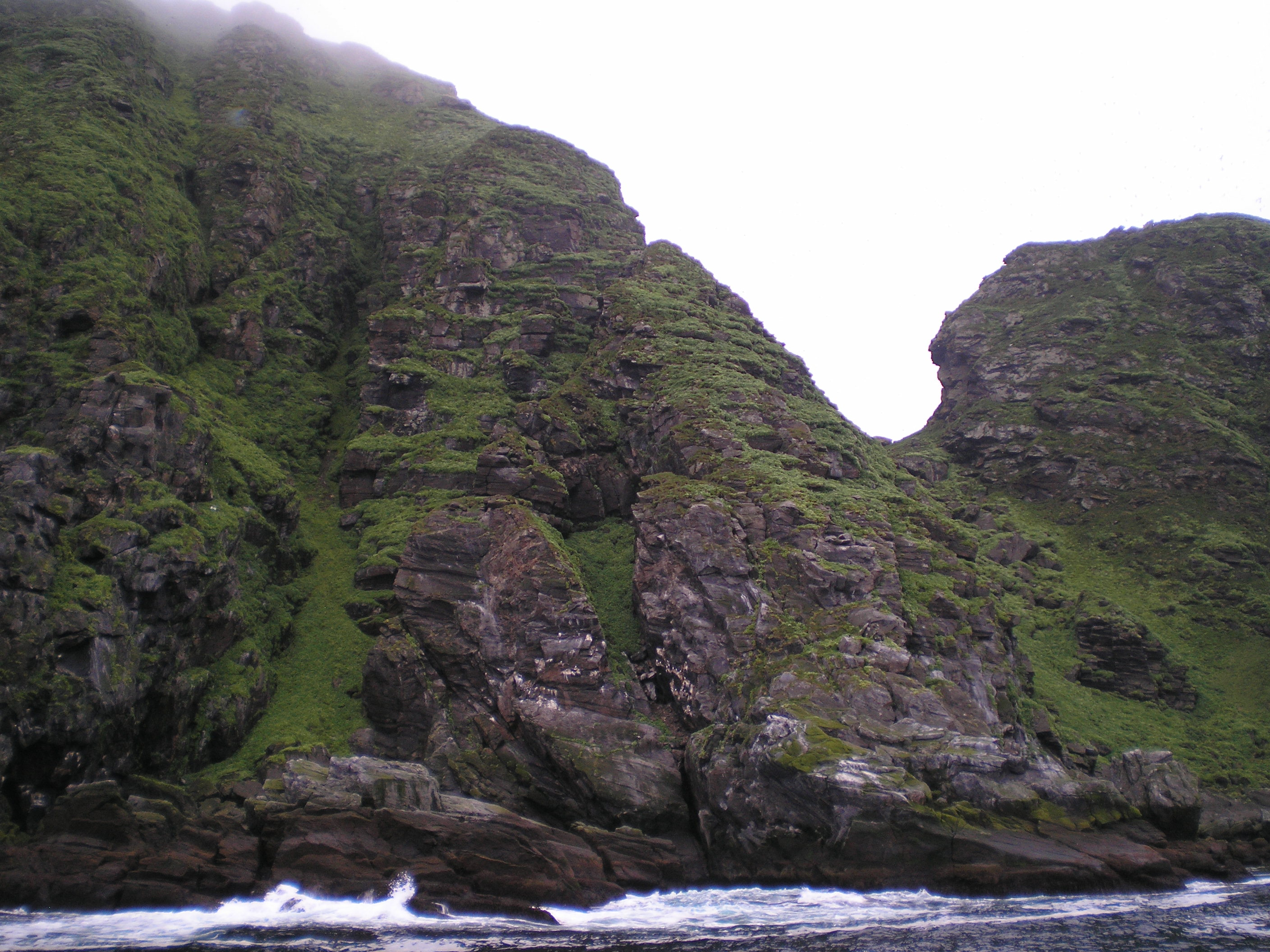
Gjesvaerstappan

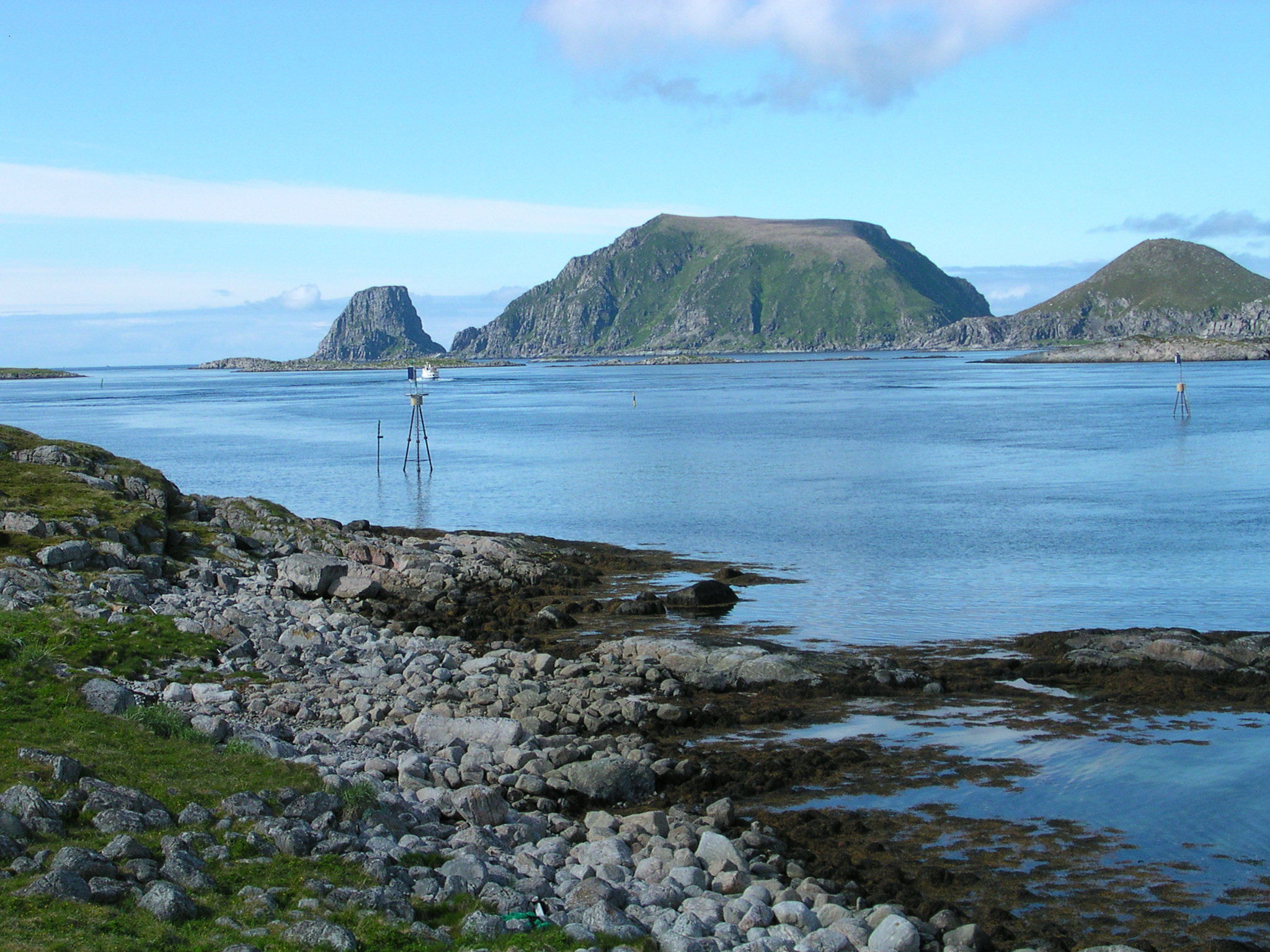
Gjesvaerstappan

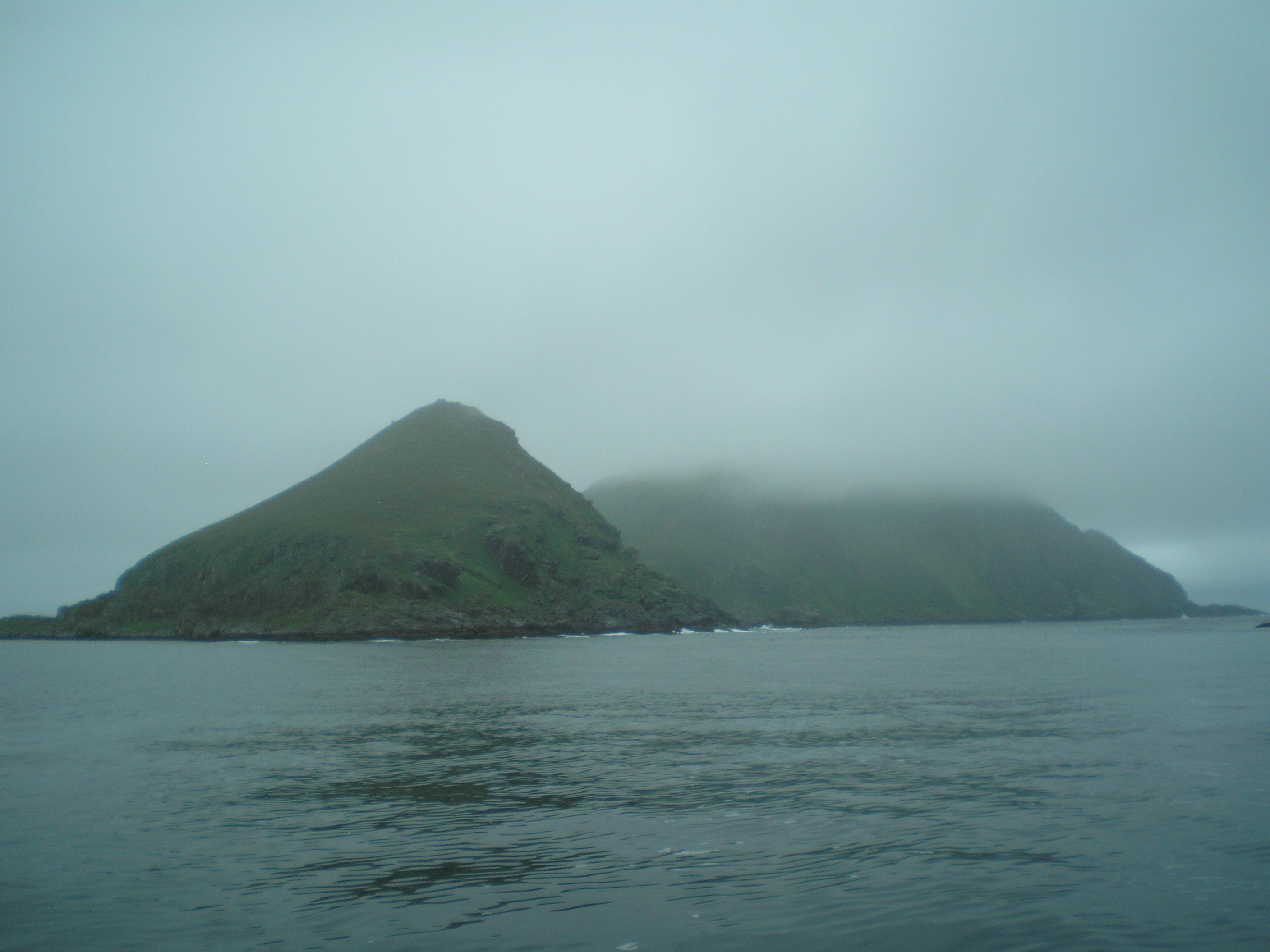
Gjesvaerstappan

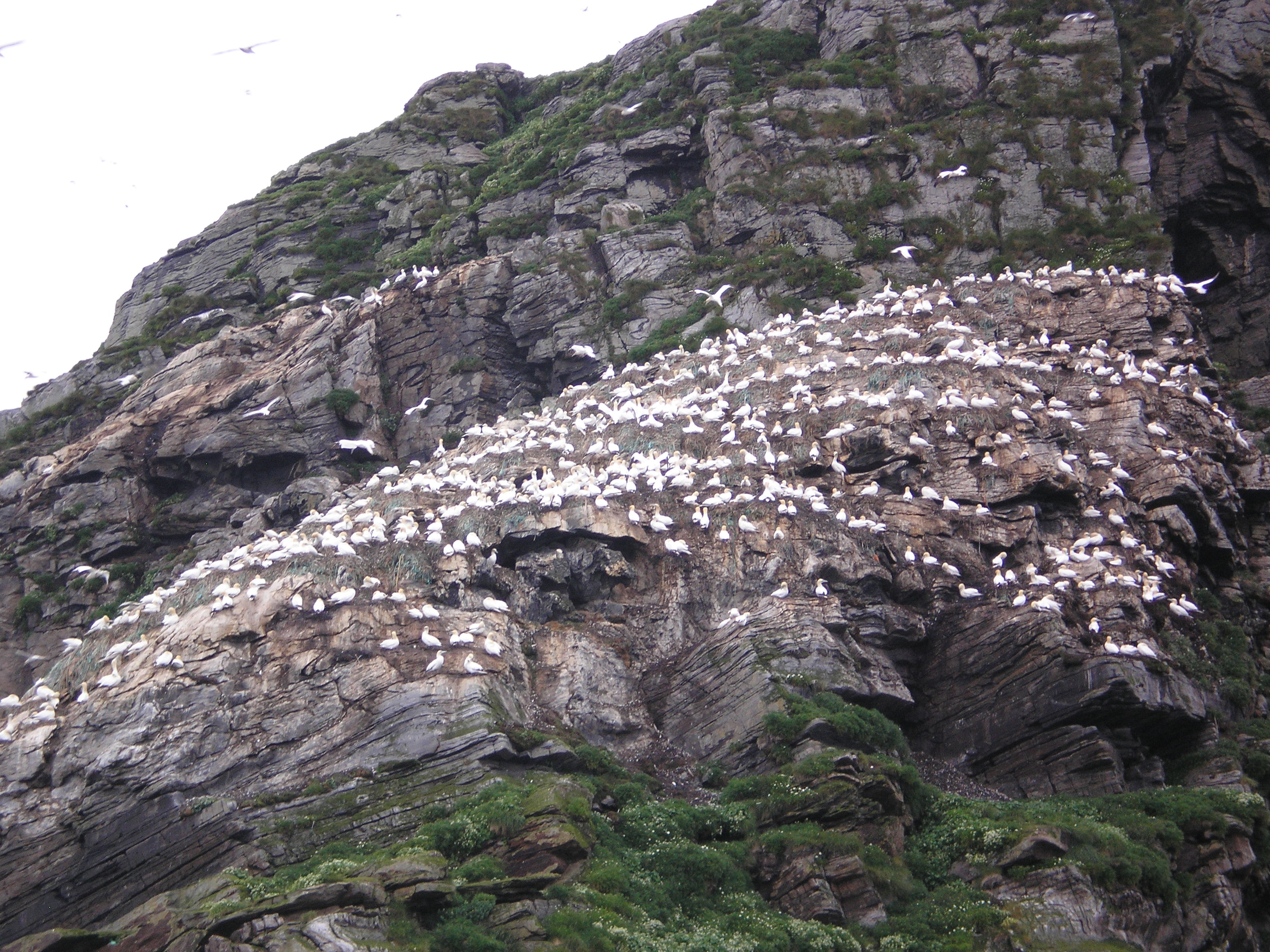
Morus bassanus on Gjesvaerstappan
