= Patalganga =

Industrial area in Maharashtra, India

Patalganga is an industrial area of the Maharashtra Industrial Development Corporation (MIDC) near Karjat and Panvel. It been named after the adjacent Patalganga River. The nearest town and junction is Karjat. The nearest hospital is Dhirubhai Ambani Hospital.

The Patalganga industrial area, adjacent to the Mohpada village, is one of the 13 chemical industrial areas developed by MIDC. A historical temple of the god Raseshwar is situated on the right bank of river Patalganga. The Patalganga industrial area is under the jurisdiction of Khalapur taluka (about 22 km) and under Raigad District (about 60 km). The area is surrounded by ranges of high mountains.

== Location ==
- The Patalganga Industrial Area is situated on the left bank of the river Patalganga, which is 10 km from Mumbai–Pune National Highway 4 and 7 km from the Mumbai–Pune Expressway. It is just 12 km from Mumbai–Goa National Highway 66.
- The nearest railway station is Rasayani/ Apte which is on Konkan Railway, about 3 km from the area.
- The Patalganga Industrial Area is about 75 km from the Domestic Airport in Santacruz & Chhatrapati Shivaji Maharaj International Airport at Andheri.
