= Palaspe =

Village in Maharashtra

- village
- Interactive map of Palaspe
- Coordinates: 19°N 73.1°E
- Country: India
- State: Maharashtra
- District: Raigad district

Languages
  - Official: Marathi
- Time zone: UTC+5:30 (IST)
- PIN: 410206
- Telephone code: 02143
- Vehicle registration: MH 46
- Nearest city: PANVEL

Palaspe is located in near Panvel in Raigad district in Maharashtra, India.

== Details ==
The town lies on Mumbai Goa National Highway (NH 4) and NH 17. The nearest Town and Rail Head is Panvel. The nearby places around Palaspe includes Karnala fort, Shirdhon, Karnala Bird Sanctuary. It has a Dhrupad gurukul.

The National highway No. 17 (NH 17) starts near Palaspe. The place is called as Palaspe phata. The highway passes through Goa till Kochi.

JNPT port is close to Palapse, 25 km away. With this, most of the farms and places in the village are occupied by container yards.
