= Karnala =

Karnala may refer to:

- Karnala Bird Sanctuary, a bird sanctuary in Maharashtra
- Karnala fort, a fort in Maharashtra
