= Baburaoji Parkhe =

Indian businessman (1912–1997)

Malhar Sadashiv "Baburaoji" Parkhe
- M S Parkhe 1912–1997
- Born: 15 April 1912; Akkalkot, India
- Died: 13 January 1997 (aged 84); Pune, India
- Occupations: Founder, Parkhe Group
- Spouse: Kamalabai Parkhe
- Children: Sudhakar Parkhe; Kunda Deshpande; Prakash Parkhe; Arun Parkhe
- Website: http://www.parkhe.org

Malhar Sadashiv (M S) "Baburaoji" Parkhe (15 April 1912 – 13 January 1997) was an Indian industrialist. Parkhe was known to have a good study of Vedic literature. He was known to be a strong follower of Param Sadguru Shree Gajanan Maharaj of Shivpuri, Akkalkot and believer in his teachings of Agnihotra. He was involved in the worldwide propagation of the Agnihotra way of life. Parkhe delivered lectures and wrote several books on the subject.

== Family and education ==
Parkhe was born into Deshastha Rigvedi Brahmin family. Parkhe's father, Sadashivrao Parkhe, held the position of Chief Justice in the Indian Princely States during the British Raj. He died when Parkhe was a teenager.

Parkhe attended Sir Parshurambhau College in Pune, where he received a Bachelor of Arts degree.

In 1935, Parkhe was married to Kamalabai Parkhe (Kashi Rajimwale), younger sister of Paramsadguru Shree Gajanan Maharaj of Akkalkot of Swami Samarth parampara.

== Industrialist ==
Parkhe Group began in 1930 with the Bharat Envelopes Company, a cottage industry operating from Pune under the guidance of his mother Maisaheb and with the assistance of his younger brother Gopalrao. The business prepared envelopes and other paper products by hand and sold them in nearby markets. The enterprise grew rapidly, becoming known as one of the most pioneering groups in India in the field of paper and pulp.

Parkhe's first large venture was Paper & Pulp Conversions Pvt Ltd (PAPCO), a board mill started in Lower Parel, Bombay in 1942. By 1947, it became a public limited company with M. S. Parkhe & Co as the managing agents, in accordance with the prevalent company laws. In 1951, PAPCO started its second unit in Khopoli, Maharashtra, which made paper, and, eventually paperboards; it was the flagship company of the group. The first paper manufacturing machine installed at Khopoli was procured from Japan. PAPCO issued dividends without interruption for over next 40 years.

In 1960, PAPCO was the chief promoter of a novel idea conceived by some small and medium paper mills: a "mother pulp mill" manufacturing market-grade pulp, the raw material for paper-making. The Central Pulp Mills (CPM) was incorporated on 4 July 1960 and commenced full operations in 1966. Many pioneering efforts like the PAPCO machinery division, Parkhe Consultants (a full-service paper industry consultancy), and Parkhe Research Institute (provided research and development support to the paper and pulp Industry) followed suit in the following three decades. Eurocote, a paper and paperboard coating unit based in Vapi, Gujarat was integrated into the group in 1976. The total turnover of the Group reached over Rupees 100 crores in the mid-1980s.

Felicitation by the President of India, Gaini Zail Singh, 12 March 1987.

The Parkhe Group suffered major losses towards the end of the 1980s. The changing situation in the wake of government policy decisions such as Rupee devaluation, Import duty reductions on pulp and free imports, continued labour problems were some of the major factors contributing to these losses. Analysts also attribute that the floods of the Patalganga river at Khopoli on Pune-Bombay highway where the PAPCO project was located since 1953, was the fatal blow for the business. This ultimately resulted in a financial crunch which engulfed the entire group. This was the state of many industries in Maharashtra during that time, such as similar cases in the textile mills closure crisis if Mumbai. Although some of the old ventures of the Parkhe Group, like PAPCO, could not be revived from the crises, the largest unit, Central Pulp Mills, was transferred to Delhi-based JK Singhania Group in 1992 and is now flourishing under a new identity of JK Paper.

== Social institutions ==
Parkhe's memoirs and writings talk about the spirit of "Social Indebtedness"; with this belief, the Parkhe Group established social and charitable trusts. The trusts focus on assisting poor and needy people in society.

== Propagation of Agnihotra and Vedic culture ==
Agnihotra is an ancient Vedic fire ritual that was resuscitated by Param Sadguru Shree Gajanan Maharaj of Akkalkot and prescribed for the well-being of entire humankind and nature.

Parkhe was an ardent follower of Shree, and has written books and papers, delivered lectures, and traveled worldwide propagating Agnihotra and research on remnants of ancient fire worship in different civilisations.

He was closely associated with the trusts and initiatives in Akkalkot and Shivpuri Ashram. At Shree's instruction, he built Lord Parshuram and Agni Mandir's in his industrial complexes in Khopoli and Songadh. He presided the Mahasomayag Committee, and made a pivotal contribution during the Ekamevadvitiya Mahasomayag of Shivpuri, Akkalkot in 1969. This was considered to be a landmark event: after many years, a Mahasomayag was conducted exactly as prescribed by the Vedas, without any animal sacrifice—not even symbolic oblations—in a totally non-violent and pious manner.

== Books and writings ==
Parkhe was an avid reader, writer, and orator. He wrote several books and papers on diverse subjects including industry, social and religious issues, Vedic literature, etc.

Listed below are some of his writings:

- Ramayashogatha Marathi/Hindi 'रामयशोगाथा' (Marathi – 1975), (Hindi: Translated – 2005) – Epic-Book on the life of Vishnu Avatar, Lord Parashuram. 21 years of research was undertaken to complete this book
- Rajrajeshwar Parshuram (Marathi) – Book on Vishnu Avatar, Lord Parashuram.
- The Universal Faith (English) – Importance of Fire Worship in all the world religions and civilisations. Popularly acclaimed in Western countries.
- Agnihotra: The Vedic Solution for Present-Day Problems (English). Popularly acclaimed in Western countries as a resource on Agnihotra.
- Agniupasana (Marathi)
- Jeevanachi Vatchal (Marathi) – His Biographical Sketch, more from the Spiritual dimension.
- Kahani Eka Udyojakachi, Utkarshachi aani Upakarshachi (Marathi) – Biographical Sketch.

Some 20 small booklets on diverse subjects or excerpts from his speeches are unpublished or in private circulation. In 2005, his personal library was donated to Shivpuri Ashram in Akkalkot in accordance with his desire. It is used for research purposes by the ashram and Agnihotra followers worldwide.

== See also ==
- Parashurama

== Bibliography ==
- Patvardhan, V. S. (15 January 2005). Growth of Indigenous Entrepreneurship, Part 2: Enterprises of Dahanukar, Apte, Dandekar, Sathe, Parkhe. Popular Prakashan. ISBN 978-81-7154-701-2.
- Kulkarni, A.Y.; Parkhe, P.M. (1990). Appropriate technologies for pulping and paper making of unconventional raw materials in India. Tappi Pulping Conference, Toronto, Ontario, Canada. Proceedings of the Technical Association of the Pulp and Paper Industry; Pulping Conference: Also: TAPPI Pulping Conference. Vol. 1. TAPPI. pp. 313–320. ISSN 0275-0899. Archived from the original on 17 July 2011.
- Parkhe, M.S. (1982). Agnihotra: The Vedic solution for present-day problems. Vaidika Samsodhana Mandala Mudranalaya. ASIN B000OHRWCS.
