= Shirdhon =

Village in Maharashtra

- village
- Location in Maharashtra, India Shirdhon (India)
- Coordinates: 18°55′2″N 73°7′50″E
- Country: India
- State: Maharashtra
- District: Raigad district

Government
  - Body: Gram panchayat

Languages
  - Official: Marathi
- Time zone: UTC+5:30 (IST)
- PIN: 410221
- Telephone code: 0215
- Vehicle registration: MH 46
- Nearest city: PANVEL
- Website: maharashtra.gov.in

Shirdhon is a small village located in near Panvel in Raigad district in Maharashtra, India.

It lies on Mumbai Goa National Highway NH 17. The nearest Town and Railway station is Panvel. Karnala fort and Karnala Bird Sanctuary are just 4 km away from Shirdhon. The village is governed by a gram panchayat.

== History ==
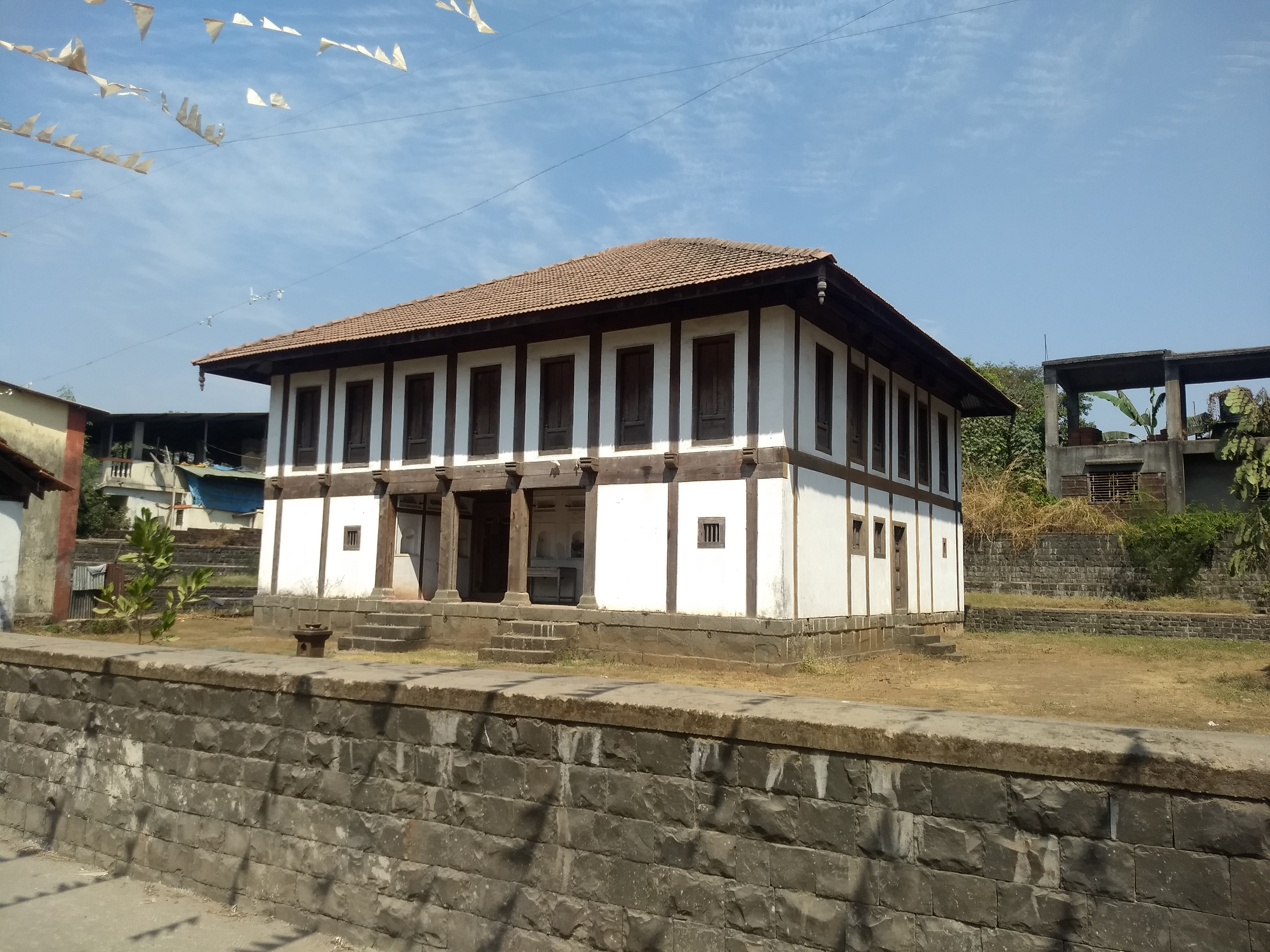
Vasudev Balwant Phadke house at Shirdhon village

Vasudeo Balwant Phadke was born on 4 November 1845 in Shirdhon. The house and his belongings are preserved and have become a major tourist center.

== Other information ==
Rice cultivation is a major income source in the area.

Shirdhon has active Science communication & youth empowerment group working towards 'Better Citizen for Better Nation' - SWAR (Sky Watchers Association of Raigad) & TCT (Takale Charitable Trust) by scientist Santosh Takale

Adya Krantiveer Vasudev Balwant Phadke Samajik Vikas Sanstha is a local trust engaging in social work the village and nearby areas.
