= Seal Ashram =

SEAL Ashram is an Indian non-governmental organization that aims to rescue individuals in need from the streets and railway stations of Mumbai. They attempt to rescue people and provide them with necessary resources like food, health-care, clothing and education at SEAL Ashram located at Panvel. Seal Ashram was established in 1999 by Pastor K M Philip.

The goal is to establish and maintain a self-sustaining network of volunteers to address the medical, food, legal, clothing, shelter, education, and spiritual needs of the underprivileged. They also offer a platform for youth to contribute to their mission.

== Workforce ==
Recent studies show that the SEAL Ashram workforce is somewhere around 31 million, making it one of the highest in India, considering that the population density in the state is also the highest and has been estimated at 1,029 people per square kilometer.

== Purpose ==
SEAL Ashram's purpose and mission was to help those in need and provide rehabilitation and providing necessary resources. This has made SEAL Ashram popular amongst the people of India and they have earned a notable reputation in Mumbai.
