= Prudence International School =

- Apta Phata, Mumbai-Goa Highway; Panvel, Maharashtra, 410221; India

Information
- Type: Private, international boarding and day school
- Established: 2005; 21 years ago
- Chairman: Tejas Khandhar
- Director: Vidhi Khandhar
- Grades: Pre-primary to 12
- Gender: Co-educational
- Affiliation: University of Cambridge
- Website: www.prudence.edu.in

Prudence International School was a private, international, co-educational boarding and day school in Panvel, Maharashtra, India. It operates from pre-primary to 12th-grade level and provides the checkpoint, Cambridge IGCSE, and A-Level examinations. It is affiliated with CAIE (University of Cambridge) and has received many district and national-level trophies in many sporting activities. The school has ranked amongst the top IGCSE boarding schools in Mumbai and Navi Mumbai by The Times of India and several ranking surveys in 2015, 2016 and 2017.

== History ==
Prudence International School was established in the year 2005 by its promoters Tejas Khandhar and Vidhi Khandhar. The campus was a rundown recreational resort which was acquired by the promoters and was converted into a school campus. The school commenced in a reverse integration starting with A-Level courses and eventually to preprimary segments.

== Academic and curriculum ==
The School follows the CAIE curriculum. The school further follows a grading system for pre-primary where monthly reports of each child are generated and can be accessed online by their parents.

== Awards ==
- Received an award as a winner in top 10 schools in India.
- Awarded most eco-friendly campus.
- Received "The White Swan Award" for the "Most Influential Brand 2015-16" in education at the Taj Lands End, Mumbai in September 2016

== See also ==
- International school
- List of international schools in India
- Avalon Heights International School
