= National Highway 348A (India) =

National highway in India

National Highway 348A
- Map of the National Highway in red

Route information
- Length: 17 km (11 mi)

Major junctions
- South end: JNPT
- North end: Palm Beach Road

Location
- Country: India
- States: Maharashtra

Highway system
- Roads in India; Expressways; National; State; Asian
← NH 348	→ NH 348

National Highway 348A, commonly called NH 348A is a small national highway in India. It is a spur road of National Highway 348. NH-348A traverses the state of Maharashtra in India.

== Route ==
JNPT, Gavanphata, Palm Beach Road.

== Junctions ==
Terminal with National Highway 348 near JNPT.

Terminal with Palm Beach Road.

== See also ==
- List of national highways in India
