= Deccan Riots =

1875 peasant riots in India

In May and June 1875, peasants of Maharashtra, some parts of Poona (now known as Pune), and Ahmednagar districts revolted against increasing agrarian distress. The Deccan Riots of 1875 targeted conditions of debt peonage (kamiuti) to moneylenders. The rioters' specific purpose was to obtain and destroy the bonds, decrees, and other documents in the possession of the moneylenders. The peasants began a systematic attack on the moneylenders’ houses and shops. They seized and publicly burnt debt bonds and deeds signed under pressure, in ignorance, or through fraud and other documents dealing with their debts. They socially boycotted the moneylenders. Within days, the disturbances spread to other villages of the Poona and Ahmednagar districts, although there was no anti-colonial consciousness among them.

Before the 1860s, 3/4th of the raw cotton imports of Britain came from the United States. British cotton manufacturers established Manchester Cotton Company in 1859 to encourage cotton exports. When the American Civil War broke out in 1861, the imports from America fell miserably. British merchants started importing and securing cotton from India to maintain the cotton exports. So, they started giving advances to Indian moneylenders who turned this into debts for ryot. Ryots in demand boom took a lot of credit and sometime forcefully given credit and made to sign bonds and deeds. The moneylenders used deceit and fraud to extract as much advantage as possible in this economic condition. After the civil war, the cotton demands fell drastically and moneylenders started recovering their money by charging high interests from ryots. Most of the time, the ryots failed to pay back the debt and were evicted from lands, which were sold. This infuriated ryots who started violent protests against deceitful moneylenders. They complained to authorities for grievance redressal. In 1859, the colonial government passed Limitation Law that reduced validity of bonds for 3 years. This could limit the money paid by the peasants to the moneylenders. But, moneylenders started signing new bonds for 3 years and at expiry signed new bond. Hence, it fuelled rebellion and riots.

As Indian agriculture was drawn into the world economy, credit, commerce, inequality and growth were interrelated. The cultivators' distress resulted from falling agricultural prices, heavy taxation, and a sense of political powerlessness. The commercialization of agriculture under colonial land revenue policies burdened small peasants by placing a premium on access to credit to finance productive investments in the land. Employing capital advanced by European merchants, local moneylenders obtained unlimited title to the property and labor of their debtors; it gave them the "power to utterly ruin and enslave the debtor." During the 19th century, they used this power to control peasant labour, and not their land, which was of little value without people to work it.

These changes in agriculture undermined the communal traditions which had been the basis of Indian village life. Access to common resources declined steadily because various forms of joint use were misunderstood by the colonial government, access to the forests was restricted, and the colonial government redefined the state's relationship to pastoral communities.

Indian nationalist Vasudeo Balwant Phadke launched a violent campaign against colonial rule in 1879, aiming to establish an Indian republic by driving them out. However, his insurrection met with limited success. Someone betrayed Phadke to claim a bounty offered by the colonial government; he was arrested and deported to Aden, where he died of a hunger strike in 1883.

== See also ==
- History of Maharashtra
- Vasudeo Balwant Phadke

== Literature ==
- Ravinder Kumar, "The Deccan Riots of 1875", The Journal of Asian Studies, Vol. 24, No. 4 (August, 1965), pp. 613–635.
- David Hardiman, ed., Peasant Resistance in India 1858-1914, Oxford University Press, Delhi [etc.] (1992).
- Report of the Committee on the Riots in Poona and Ahmednagar, 1875, Bombay (1876).
- Neil Charlesworth, "The Myth of the Deccan Riots of 1875", Modern Asian Studies, Vol. 6, No. 4 (1972), pp. 401–421.
- Ira Klein, "Utilitarianism and Agrarian Progress in Western India", The Economic History Review, N. S., Vol. 18, No. 3 (1965), pp. 576–597.
