= Panvel =

- City Panvel
- Interactive map of Panvel
- Location in Mumbai environs
- Coordinates: 18°59′40″N 73°06′50″E
- Country: India
- State: Maharashtra
- District: Raigad
- Taluka: Panvel
- Named for: Paneli

Government
  - Type: Municipal Corporation
  - Body: Panvel Municipal Corporation
  - Municipal Commissioner: Mangesh Chitale (IAS)
  - Mayor: Nitin Patil (BJP)

Area
  - Total: 110.06 km^{2} (42.49 sq mi)
- Elevation: 28 m (92 ft)

Population (2021)
  - Total: 311,434
  - Density: 4,632.94/km^{2} (11,999.3/sq mi)
- Demonym: Panvelkar/Panvelite

Languages
  - Official: Marathi
- Time zone: UTC+5:30 (IST)
- PIN: 410206/ 410217/ 410208/410218.
- Telephone code: 022
- Vehicle registration: MH-46
- Website: www.panvelcorporation.com

Panvel (Marathi pronunciation: [pənʋeːl]) is a city and a geographical part of Navi Mumbai situated in the Raigad district of Maharashtra. It is highly populated due to its proximity to Mumbai. Panvel is also governed for development purpose by CIDCO. Panvel Municipal Corporation is the first municipal corporation in Raigad and the first municipal corporation of Maharashtra State.

== Geography ==
Panvel is also called "the gate of Raigad," because Panvel is the first city when entering in Raigad from the west. It is also one of the most populous and developed cities in the district. Panvel is situated on the banks of the Gadhi river which flows and connects all the way to the Arabian Sea. It is also surrounded by hills on two sides.

== Demographics ==
Religion in Panvel (2011)
Religion	Percent
Hinduism	78.67%
Islam	10.85%
Buddhism	5.92%
Christianity	2.13%
Jainism	1.29%
Others	1.14%

Panvel has a mixed-ethnicity population consisting of the Agri samaaj and Koli communities. Panvel is a medium-sized city but is densely populated as it is strategically placed between Mumbai and Pune. The city is the headquarters of the Panvel sub-division of the Raigad district, which is the largest in the district as per number of villages (564).

== Religion ==
According to the 2011 census, Hinduism is the majority religion in the city of Panvel with 78.67% followers. Islam is second most popular religion in the city of Panvel with approximately 10.85% following it, followed by Buddhism with 5.92% followers. In Panvel city, Christianity is followed by 2.13%, Jainism by 1.29%, Sikhism by 0.47%. Around 0.13% stated 'Other Religion', approximately 0.54% stated 'No Particular Religion'.

Year	Male	Female	Total Population	Change	Religion (%)							
Year	Male	Female	Total Population	Change	Hindu	Muslim	Christian	Sikhs	Buddhist	Jain	Other religions and persuasions	Religion not stated
2001	54963	49095	104058	-	80.640	12.334	1.533	0.550	3.389	1.416	0.102	0.037
2011	92484	87536	180020	0.730	78.665	10.851	2.126	0.473	5.924	1.289	0.127	0.545

== Climate ==
Weather is Sunny across the year. There is heavy rain during monsoon. May is the warmest month of the year. The temperature in May averages 34.3 °C. The lowest average temperatures in the year occur in January, when it is around 23.4 °C. Temperatures hover around 40 °C during most days of summer during mid-March till May. Highest temperature recorded around 44–45 °C. Average annual temperature of Panvel is 27.0 °C.

Climate data for Panvel
Month	Jan	Feb	Mar	Apr	May	Jun	Jul	Aug	Sep	Oct	Nov	Dec	Year
Mean daily maximum °C (°F)	29.4 (84.9)	30 (86)	32 (90)	33.5 (92.3)	34.2 (93.6)	32.4 (90.3)	29.9 (85.8)	29.8 (85.6)	30.2 (86.4)	32.3 (90.1)	32.1 (89.8)	30.7 (87.3)	31.4 (88.5)
Daily mean °C (°F)	23.4 (74.1)	24.2 (75.6)	26.7 (80.1)	28.8 (83.8)	30.3 (86.5)	29.3 (84.7)	27.4 (81.3)	27.2 (81.0)	27.3 (81.1)	27.9 (82.2)	26.5 (79.7)	24.6 (76.3)	27.0 (80.5)
Mean daily minimum °C (°F)	17.7 (63.9)	18.4 (65.1)	21.5 (70.7)	24.2 (75.6)	26.4 (79.5)	26.2 (79.2)	25 (77)	24.6 (76.3)	24.4 (75.9)	23.1 (73.6)	21 (70)	18.6 (65.5)	22.6 (72.7)
Average rainfall mm (inches)	1.3 (0.05)	1.3 (0.05)	0.3 (0.01)	1.8 (0.07)	17 (0.7)	484.6 (19.08)	1,073.9 (42.28)	676 (26.6)	369.6 (14.55)	93.7 (3.69)	18 (0.7)	3.1 (0.12)	2,740.6 (107.9)
Average rainy days	0.2	0.1	0.1	0.1	0.9	15.7	27.3	25.4	16	4.4	1	0.2	91.4
Source: Climate Dat

== History ==
Panvel (also known as Panwell by the British) is about 300 years old, developed around trade routes (both land and sea), during the Maratha rule and hence after by the Mughal rule, British and the Portuguese. Once upon a time, Panvel was famous for its rice market. Panvel Municipal Council (PMC) was established in the year 1852, and was the oldest municipal council of Maharashtra, before the formation of Panvel Municipal Corporation. Panvel Municipal Council's elections started in the year 1910. The first mayor of the PMC was Mr. Yusuf Noor Mohammed Master Kachchi for the years 1910–1916. The sesquicentennial anniversary (150th anniversary) of the PMC was celebrated in the year 2002. The city prospered and grew due to the influence of large scale trade by land and sea. This was characterised by the large palace-like homes that came up during the Peshwa period. It is also said that old name of this city was Paneli (Panelim in Konkani). There were historic cannons (during the time of Chhatrapati Shivaji Maharaj) situated on Panvel fort. On 1 October 2016, Panvel Municipal Corporation came into existence.

== Location ==
Panvel lies approximately 40 kilometers east of Greater Mumbai, in Mumbai Metropolitan Region. It is surrounded by the mountains of Matheran to the east and south east and outer regions of Panvel i.e. villages of Dundhare, Maldunge are separated from the suburbs of Badlapur and Ambarnath by hilly ranges of the Western Ghats. It lies adjacent to the Navi Mumbai International Airport forming its eastern boundary.

== Education ==
Educational institutions in Panvel include:

- Pillai College of Engineering (Autonomous), New Panvel
- Prudence International School (IGCSE and IB Board)

== Economy ==
Panvel is surrounded by some major Maharashtra Industrial Development Corporation (MIDC) managed regions like Patalganga, Taloja, Nagothane, Roha, Khopoli, Bhiwandi. Some of the Indian industry majors like Larsen & Toubro Limited, Reliance, Hindustan Organic Chemicals Ltd., ISRO's Propellant Complex., ONGC, IPCL are based around Panvel providing mass employment. The JNPT port is also located near Panvel. New SEZ declared by government are coming around Panvel.

== Landmarks ==
=== Karnala fort ===
Karnala fort is a hill fort in Raigad district about 10 km from Panvel city. Currently it is a protected place lying within the Karnala Bird Sanctuary. It was a fort of strategic importance as it overlooked the Bor pass which connected the Konkan coast to the interior of Maharashtra (Vidharba) and was the main trade route between these areas. It lies between Pen and Panvel near Shirdhon village. The fort is 370 m above mean sea level.

=== Karnala bird sanctuary ===
At the bottom of the fort there is a famous Karnala Bird Sanctuary Maharashtra government declared this 4.5 km region as the bird sanctuary in 1968–69. In the sanctuary one can find around 150 species of birds, such as the red vented bulbul, Indian grey hornbill, owl, paradise fly catcher.

=== Shirdhon ===
Vasudeo Balwant Phadke was born on 1845-11-04 in Shirdhon village of Panvel taluka based in Raigad district in Maharashtra state. The house and his belongings are preserved there.

=== Gadeshwar dam ===
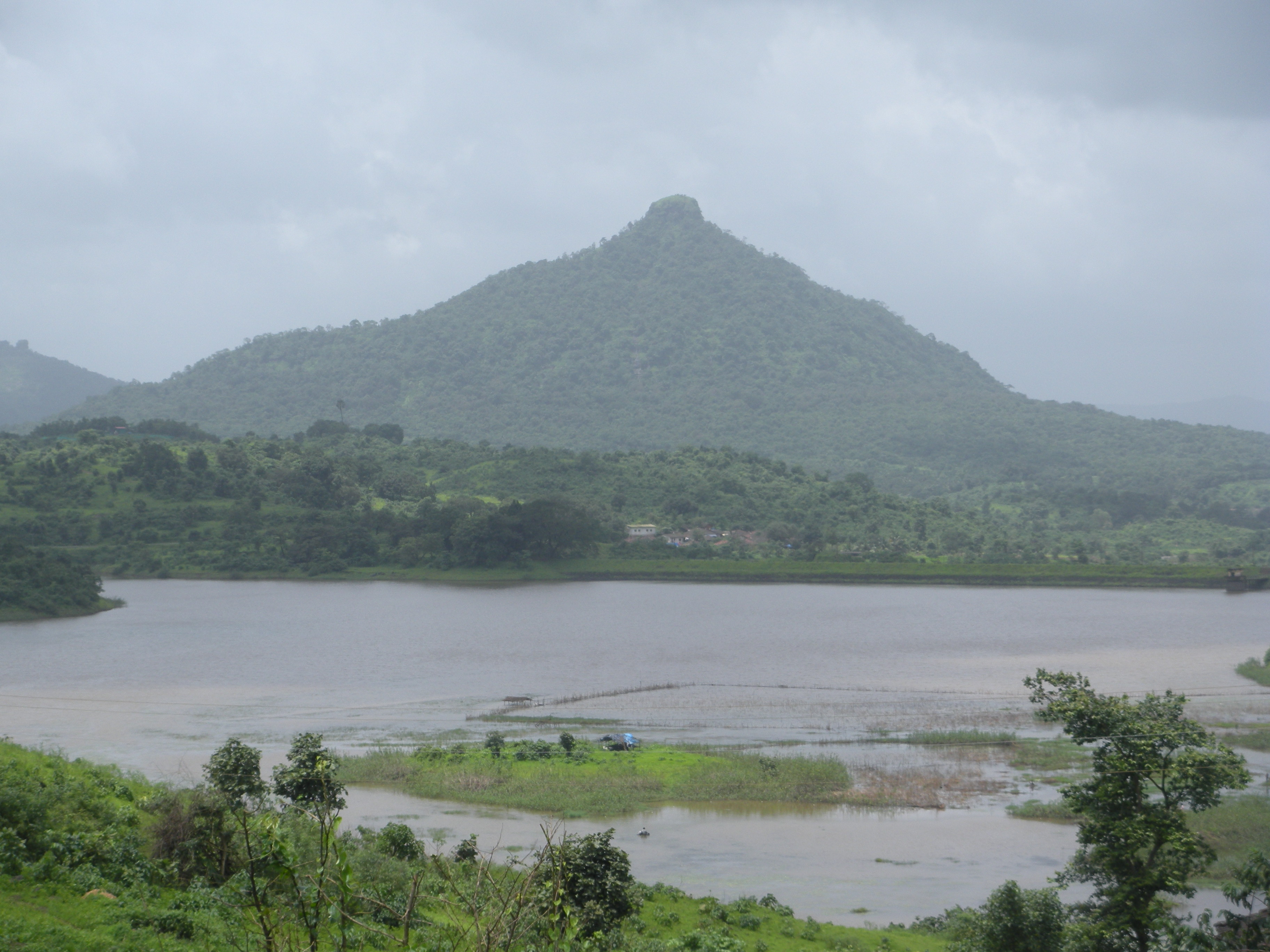
Gadeshwar Reservoir

During the monsoon, the Gadeshwar dam overflows. The place can be reached by entering New Panvel and via the Sukhapur-Nere road. Panvel is also famous for watermelons, which can be found abundantly in and around the city and the old Mumbai–Pune highway.

=== Matheran ===
Matheran is a hill station and a municipal council in the Raigad district in the Indian state of Maharashtra. It is a hill station in Karjat Tahsil and is also the smallest hill station in India. It is located on the Western Ghats range at an elevation of around 800 m (2,625 feet) above sea level. It is located around 90 km from Mumbai, and 120 km from Pune. Matheran's proximity to many metropolitan cities makes it a popular weekend getaway for urban residents. The Matheran Mountain can be easily viewed from certain areas in Panvel. One can trek matheran from Dhodani village in Panvel. The name Matheran means "forest on the forehead" (of the mountains).

=== Beth El Synagogue ===
Situated on M.G. Road, Panvel, it is the only synagogue in Panvel and is visited by both Jews and non-Jews. It is a tourist place and part of the Indian heritage.

=== Ballaleshwar Pali ===
Ballaleshwar (lit. ' Ballal's Lord') temple is one of the eight temples of Lord Ganesha. Among Ganesha temples, Ballaleshwar is the only incarnation of Ganesha that is known by his devotee's name. It is located in the village of Pali which is at a distance of 30 km from Karjat in the Raigad district. It is situated between fort Sarasgad and the river Amba. this is 11 km.from nagothane.

=== Varadvinayak, Mahad ===
Varadvinayak, also spelt as Varadavinayaka, is one of the Ashtavinayak temples of the Hindu deity Ganesha. It is located in Mahad village situated in Khalapur taluka near Karjat and Khopoli of Raigad district, Maharashtra, India. The temple was built (restored) by Peshwa General Ramji Mahadev Biwalkar in 1725AD. There is an NMMT bus no. 58 from Belapur to Khopoli which halts at Mahad.

== Transport ==
Panvel is an important junction point as many major highways meet and pass through the city. The Mumbai-Pune Expressway, Sion-Panvel Expressway, Bengaluru-Mumbai Highway, NH 4B and NH 66 start from here while NH 4 passes through Panvel. Roads of New Panvel are maintained by CIDCO while those in Panvel by PMC. New Panvel, being developed by CIDCO, has well planned and wide lane major roads and even the arterial roads are of two lanes leading to a single direction. Old Panvel has relatively less maintained roads which are congested due to lack of planning on part of the PMC.

=== Navi Mumbai International Airport ===
The Navi Mumbai International Airport is an airport in Ulwe, near Panvel, which was inaugurated by Prime minister of India Narendra Modi on 8 October 2025. It was built on lands of nearby villages in Panvel Taluka area in the city of Panvel through public-private partnership (PPP) — with the private sector partner getting 74% equity and Airports Authority of India (AAI) & Maharashtra government, through CIDCO, holding 13% each.

=== Railway ===
Panvel railway station is one of the most important junctions on Central Railway. Harbour line from Mumbai CSMT, central line from Diva / Karjat, Western Dedicated Freight Corridor from JNPT and the line from Roha meet at Panvel. Panvel railway station comes under Mumbai division of Central Railway. Panvel is one of the terminating stations of the harbour line of the Mumbai Suburban Railway. It is also considered as an entry point for trains bound for Konkan Railway from northern and western India. Platforms 1,2,3 & 4 are for suburban trains while platforms 5,6 & 7 are for main line trains. Nine pairs of daily express trains, 13 pairs of non-daily express trains and 12 daily commuter (passenger) trains stop here. Also, the Ernakulam – Hazrat Nizamuddin Duronto Express has a technical halt at Panvel for crew change, refueling and catering. In addition, Panvel handles 116 suburban trains which go to destinations Mumbai CSMT, Wadala Road, Goregaon and Thane. The station also handles a sizeable amount of freight trains. Panvel is considered equivalent to Mumbai for trains which skip Mumbai. The trains run on diesel traction and alternating current (the tracks to Konkan are not electrified south of Roha), and Panvel is a refueling point for their locomotives. In addition to refueling, Panvel has a huge number of parcel bookings, and most trains stop for periods varying from 5 minutes to 20 minutes for technical purposes. Panvel also handles crew and locomotive change for a few long-distance passenger / freight trains.

Diesel locomotives have a refuelling facility in Panvel. The city has a good daily connectivity to Pune, Ahmedabad, Delhi, Thiruvananthapuram, Kochi, Goa etc. Also, there are trains for Patna, Bikaner, Chennai, Bhavnagar, Veraval, Vasco etc. Sampark Krantis and Rajdhanis have halt here along with Garib Rath and Double Decker. Some of the daily trains are 12051/52 Jan Shatabdi Express (Dadar – Madgaon), Mandovi Express, Pragati Express, Konkan Kanya Express,etc. Now all the local trains will be 12 Coach as now the current line is AC current. Indian Railways's Central Railway division conducted an inaugural run of an AC local train from Panvel to Thane on 30 January 2020 at 3:30 pm on an open path towards Thane. On its return journey, the train ran from Thane to Panvel on an open path. The AC Local started its regular commercial services from 31 January 2020. The AC local also starts from Nerul and Vashi to Thane. On the day of its inaugural run, many travellers boarded the train as they weren't aware that a separate ticket was needed to board the AC Local. The train was even made to halt at one station as one door got blocked and wasn't opening. This further delayed the train's as well as other trains' timings on the route. This all happened despite the train had security guards and ticket checkers. Following this incident, the number of security guards and ticket checkers was nearly doubled and awareness was being created amongst travellers.

Panvel PNVL
Next Main station towards Mumbai: CBD Belapur	Next small station towards Mumbai: Khandeshwar	Central Railway	Next small station from Mumbai: Chikhale	Next main station from Mumbai: Karjat
Next Main station towards Mumbai: CBD Belapur	Next small station towards Mumbai: Khandeshwar	Distance from Mumbai (CSMT) = 54 km	Next small station from Mumbai: Chikhale	Next main station from Mumbai: Karjat
Next Main station towards Mumbai: Diva Junction	Next Small station towards Mumbai: Kalamboli	Konkan Railway	Next small station from Mumbai: Somatne	Next Main station from Mumbai: Roha

=== Autorickshaws ===
There are many autorickshaws in Panvel. The minimum fare is Rs. 20 in share-autos, but Rs. 40 for sole-hire. This is high as compared to the Rs. 18 in other parts of Navi Mumbai, Mumbai & Thane. Even though there is now the cheaper CNG fuel, autos – because of political support – are not controlled by the RTO. There is no "Fare Chart" defined by RTO for Panvel, unlike other parts of Navi Mumbai. This needs to improve for the benefit of commuters.

=== Bus ===
There are two main bus stands in Panvel – ST stand on the National Highway and NMMT stand near Railway Station. The ST buses are available from Panvel to Khopoli, Karjat, Rasayani, Alibaug, Pen, Roha, Thane, Bhiwandi, Kalyan, Dombivli, Badlapur, Dadar, Uran as well as beyond Mumbai Metropolitan Region. NMMT AC and Non-AC buses are available from Panvel to Vashi, Thane, Kalyan, Bandra, Nariman Point, Khopoli, Karjat, Rasayani and inner areas of Panvel city. Panvel is the second busiest bus station in the state after Latur. It is the major bus station for the state as it a junction for Konkan and Pune routes buses. There is a heavy rush on Ganpati Festival, Diwali Festival and May vacations.

== See also ==
- Sainagar
