= Krishna Sable =

Head Constable of Ahmednagar Police force Krishna Sable
- Born: Sabla village, Kaij, Beed, Marathwada, British India
- Died: 1879; Ahmednagar Central Jail, Ahmadnagar, British India
- Cause of death: Hanged
- Occupation: Patil of Sabla
- Era: British era
- Movement: Indian independence movement
- Children: Marutirao Krishnajirao Sable

Krishna Sable (also spelled) Sabla was an Indian freedom fighter. He was born in Sabla village in present-day Maharashtra. Along with Tantya Makaji, he led a rebellion against the British.

Krishna Sable was a high-ranking officer in the Ahmednagar police force, but during the tribal revolt in Maharashtra, Sable also left the English police force and took up arms against British rule.

== Freedom movement ==
Taking inspiration from Vasudev Balwant Phadke, who was already in revolt in Pune, Sable left the Ahmednagar police force in March 1879 and declared war against British rule; his young son, Maruti Sable, joined him. Sable united some revolutionary Koli people and attacked British government offices and bases in Pune for seven months.

In July, Sable's rebellion appeared quite strong. He challenged the British subordinate bhor and government in Konkan. The British government sent British troops from Purandar and Saswad under the leadership of Major Wise to capture Sable but the army suffered failure after the encounter. During the monsoon, Sabale remained silent and in the meantime Tantya Makaji, who had been against the British rule for a long time, became one with Sable.

On 14 October 1879, a comrade of the Sable's of the Ramosi caste who belonged to the group of Tantya Makaji turned traitor, informing the British of all the activities of the revolutionaries, due to which Sable roasted in the accusations of the traitor. In December 1879, Major Wise's attacked Sable's group, resulting in a number of companions being killed during the encounter, and Sabale was taken as a captive to Ahmednagar, where he was hanged.
