= Vasudev Balwant Phadke =

Indian independence activist (1845–1883)

- Born: 4 November 1845; Shirdhon, Raigad district, Bombay Presidency, Company India
- Died: 17 February 1883 (aged 37); Aden, Aden Settlement
- Occupations: Revolutionary and Indian independence activist
- Known for: Being foremost in the Indian armed rebellion and Indian independence movement

Vasudev Balwant Phadke (4 November 1845 – 17 February 1883) was an Indian independence activist and revolutionary who sought India's independence from colonial rule. He is also considered one of the 'Adi Kraantikaaris' or the 'First Revolutionists'. He was inspired by the motives of Chhattrapati Shivaji Maharaj, a prominent king and a godly figure to all Maharashtrians. Phadke was moved by the plight of the farming community and believed that Swaraj was the only remedy for their ills. With the help of various sub-communities of Hindu society he created a movement against British rule. The group started an armed struggle to overthrow the colonial government, launching raids on wealthy European businessmen to obtain funds for the purpose. Phadke came to prominence when he got control of the city of Pune for a few days after catching colonial soldiers off-guard during a surprise attack.

== Early years ==
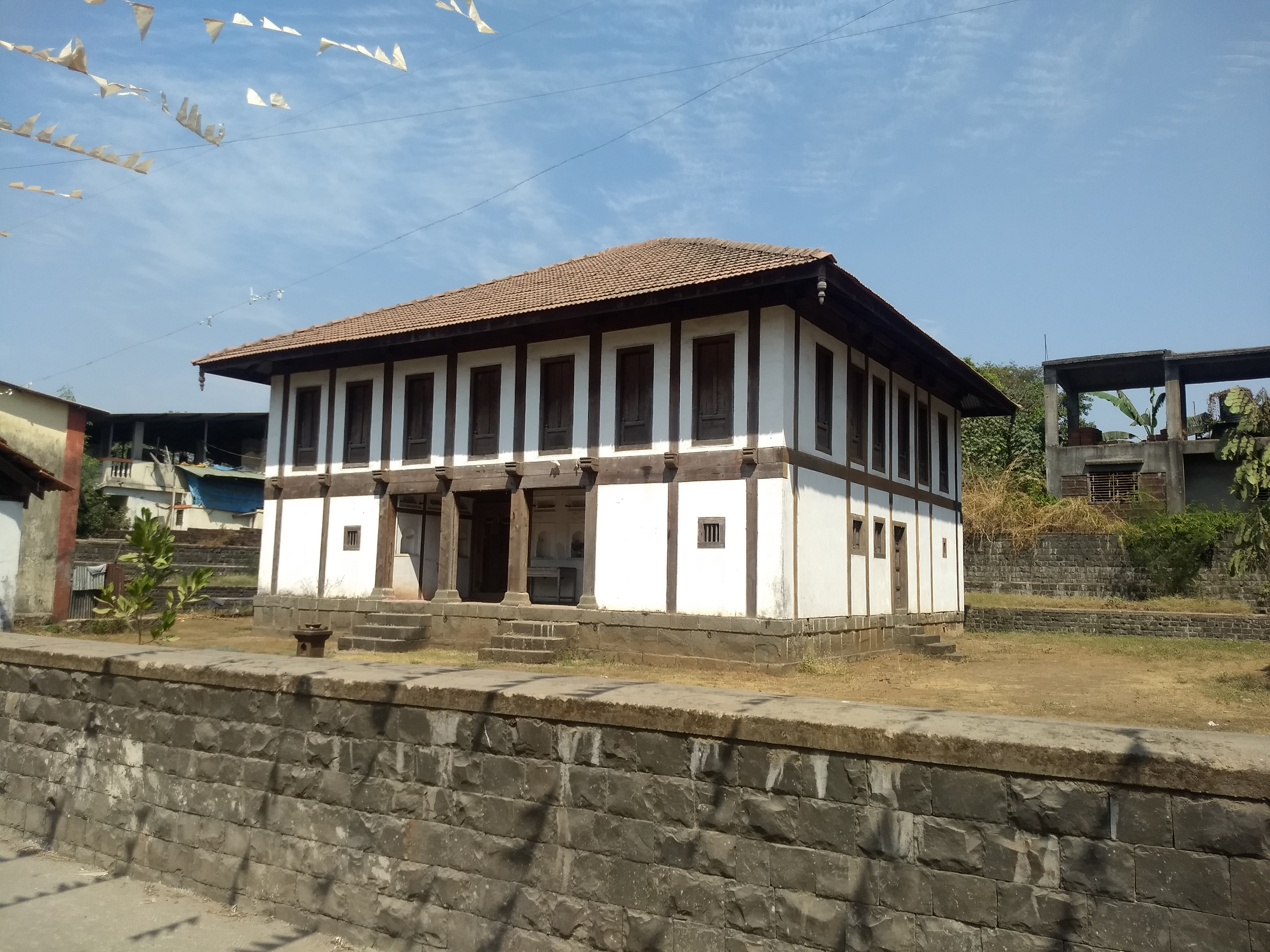
Vasudev Balwant Phadke house at Shirdhon village

Phadke was born on 4 November 1845 in Shirdhon village in the Thane district of Bombay (now in Raigad district of Maharashtra), during the tenure of George Arthur as governor, to a Marathi Chitpavan Brahmin family of limited means. As a child, he preferred learning physical skills like wrestling and riding over school education and subsequently dropped out of high school. Eventually he moved to Pune and took the job as a clerk with military accounts department in Pune for 15 years. Lahuji Raghoji Salve, then a prominent social figure based in Pune, was his mentor. Salve, an expert wrestler, operated a training center for wrestling. Salve preached the importance of independence from colonial rule. Salve belonged to the Mang community, an untouchable community, taught Phadke the importance of getting backward castes into mainstream independence movement. It was during this period that Phadke began attending lectures by Mahadev Govind Ranade which mainly focused on how the economic policies of the colonial government hurt the Indian economy. Phadke was deeply hurt by how this was leading to widespread ill-effects in the society. In 1870, he joined a public agitation in Pune that was aimed at addressing people's grievances. Phadke founded an institution, the Aikya Vardhini Sabha, to educate the youth. While working as clerk, he was not able to see his dying mother due to the delay in approval of his leave. This incident enraged Phadke and was to be the turning point in his life.

=== Co-founding of Maharashtra Education Society ===
Phadke was one of the earliest persons to graduate from a British-established institution in Bombay presidency. In 1860, along with fellow social reformers and revolutionaries Laxman Narhar Indapurkar and Waman Prabhakar Bhave, Phadke co-founded the Poona Native Institution (PNI) which was later renamed as the Maharashtra Education Society (MES). Through the PNI, he went on set up Bhave School in Pune. Today, the MES runs over 77 institutions in various parts of Maharashtra.

== Rebellion ==
In 1875, after the then Gaekwad ruler of Baroda, Malhar Rao Gaekwad was deposed by the colonial government, Phadke launched protest speeches against the government. Severe famine coupled with the apathy of the colonial administration propelled him to tour the Deccan region, urging people to strive for an independent Indian republic. Unable to get support from the educated classes, he gathered a band of people from the Ramoshi caste. People from the Kolis, Bhils and Dhangars were also included later. He taught himself to shoot, ride and fence. He organised around 300 men into an insurgent group that aimed at gaining Indian independence from colonial rule. Phadke intended to build an army of own but lacking funds they decided to break into government treasuries. The first raid was done in a village called Dhamari in Shirur taluka in Pune district. The income tax which was collected and sent to the colonial government was kept in the house of local business man Balchand Faujmal Sankla. They attacked the house and took the money for the benefit of famine stricken villagers. There they collected about four hundred rupees but this led to his being branded as a dacoit. To save himself Phadke had to flee from village to village, sheltered by his sympathisers and well-wishers, mostly the lower class of the society. Impressed by his zeal and determination, the villagers of Nanagaon offered him protection and cover in the local forest. The general plot would be to cut off all the communications of British forces and then raid the treasury. The main purpose of these raids was to feed famine-affected farmer communities. Phadke performed many such raids in areas near Shirur and Khed talukas in Pune.

Meanwhile, the leader of Ramoshi, Daulatrao Naik, who was the main supporter of Phadke, headed towards the Konkan area on the western coast. On 10–11 May 1879, they raided Palaspe and Chikhali, looting around 1.5 lakh rupees. While returning towards Ghat Matha, Major Daniel attacked Naik, who was shot dead. His death was a setback to Phadke's revolt: the loss of support forced him to move south to the Shri Shaila Mallikarjun Shrine. Later, Phadke recruited about 500 Rohillas to begin a fresh fight.

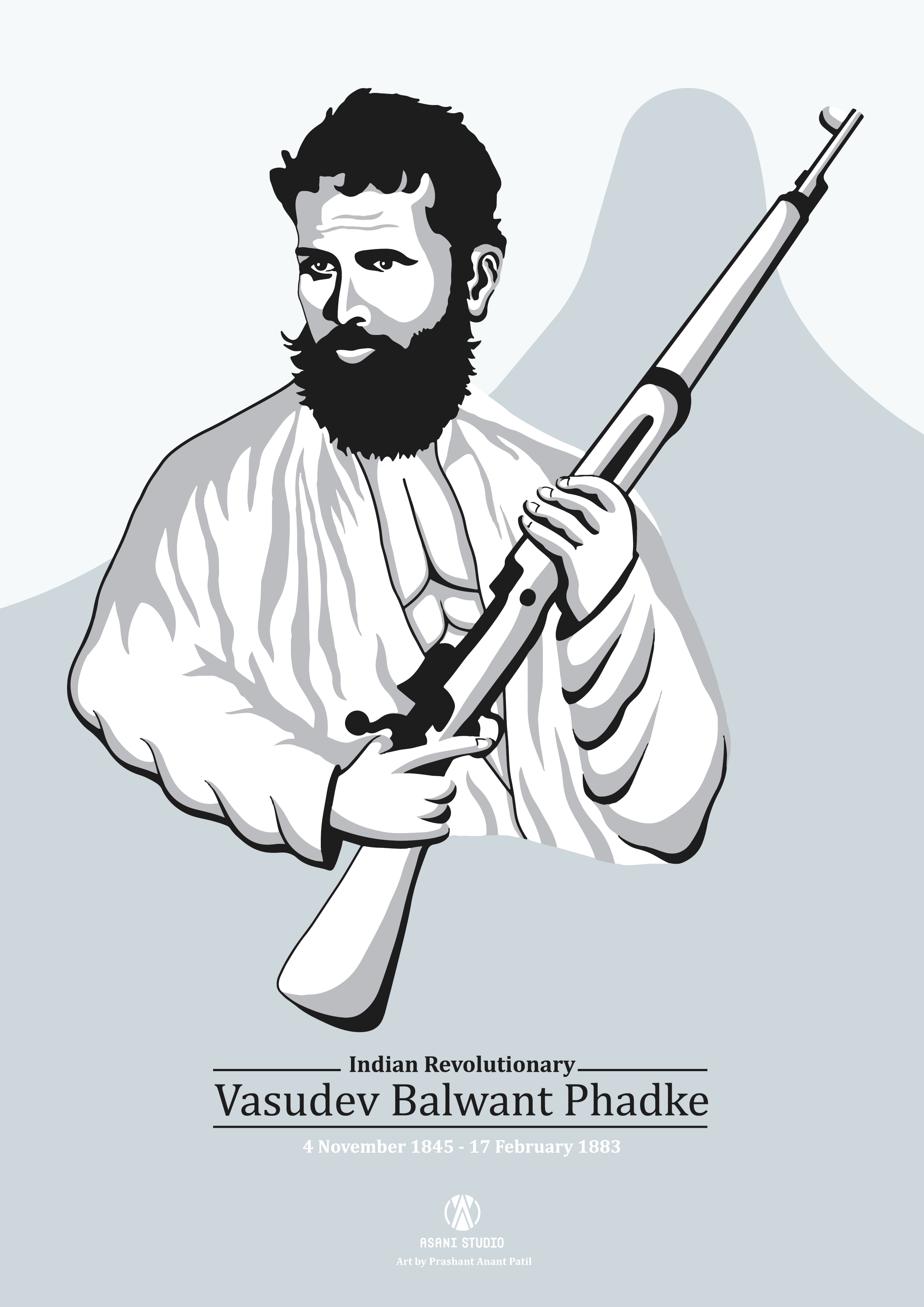
Vasudev Balvant Fadke's digital sketch by Prashant Anant Patil

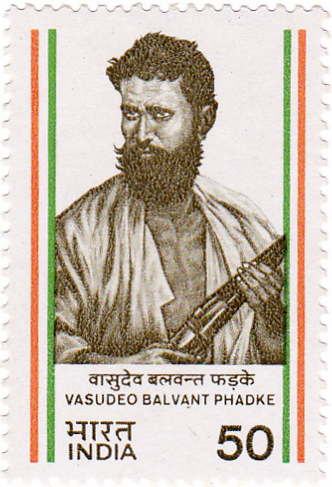
Vasudev Balwant Phadke 1984 stamp of India

== Capture and death ==
Phadke's plans to organise several simultaneous attacks against the colonial government nationwide were met with very limited success. He once had a direct engagement with the colonial army in the village of Ghanur, whereafter the government offered a bounty for his capture. Not to be outdone, Phadke in turned offered a bounty for the capture of the Governor of Bombay, announced a reward for the killing of each European, and issued other threats to the government. He then fled to Hyderabad State to recruit Rohilla and Arabs into his organisation. A British Major, Henry William Daniell and Abdul Haque, Police Commissioner to the Nizam of Hyderabad, pursued the fleeing Phadke day and night. The British move to offer a bounty for his capture met with success: someone betrayed Phadke, and he was captured in a temple after a fierce fight at the town of Kaladgi on 20 July 1879 while he was on his way to Pandharpur.

From here he was taken to Pune for trial. Ganesh Vasudeo Joshi, also known as Sarvajanik Kaka, defended his case. Phadke and his comrades were housed in the District Sessions court Jail building, near Sangam Bridge, which now happens to be the state C.I.D. Headquarters building. His own diary provided evidence to have him sentenced for life. Phadke was transported to jail at Aden in Yemen, but escaped from the prison by taking the door off from its hinges on 13 February 1883. He was soon recaptured and then went on a hunger strike and died on 17 February 1883.

== Recognition ==
In 1984, India Post issued a 50 paise stamp in honour of Phadke. A chowk in South Mumbai near Metro Cinema is named in his honour.

Vasudev Balwant Phadke, a Marathi film directed by Gajendra Ahire, was released in December 2007.

== See also ==
- Deccan Riots
- Krishna Sable
