= Raghunath Vaman Dighe =

Marathi writer

Raghunath Vaman Dighe (23 March 1896 - 4 July 1980) was a Marathi writer from Bombay Presidency, India (some of his later works where created when the area was known as Bombay State or after the state was divided and the area became Maharashtra). He wrote notable novels pertaining to rural life in Maharashtra.

Dighe started his professional career as a lawyer in Pune, but later moved to the nearby small town of Khopoli and switched to full-time writing.

== Works ==
Raghunath Vaman Dighe
- Born: 23 March 1896
- Died: 4 July 1980 (aged 84)
- Occupation: Writer

=== Novels ===
- Pankala (पाणकळा) (1939)
- Sarai (सराई) (1943)
- Poortata (पूर्तता) (1944)
- Nisargakanya Ranjai (निसर्गकन्या रानजाई) (1946)
- Ganlubdha Mruganayana (गानलुब्धा मृगनयना) (1947)
- Pad Re Panya (पड रे पाण्या) (1948)
- Aai Ahe Shetat (आई आहे शेतात)
- Kartiki (कार्तिकी)
- Sonaki (सोनकी)
- Ramya Ratri (रम्य रात्री)

A 1974 movie Kartiki (कार्तिकी) was made as based on the novel with the same name.

Dighe was a script writer of the movie Madhosh.

=== Play ===
- Majha Sabud (माझा सबुद)

=== Collection of poems ===
- Gatat Nachtat Dharatichi Lekare (गातात नाचतात धरतीची लेकरे)
