= Sankshi fort =

Sankshi Fort
- सांक्शी किल्ला
- Raigad district, Maharashtra

Site information
- Type: Hill fort
- Owner: IndiaGovernment of India
- Controlled by: Ahmadnagar (1540-1594); Portugal (1594); Maratha Empire (1739-1818); United Kingdom: East India Company (1818-1857); British Raj (1857-1947); India (1947-)
- Open to the public: Yes
- Condition: Ruins

Location
- Shown within Maharashtra
- Location within Maharashtra
- Coordinates: 18°47′14″N 73°07′51.7″E
- Height: 850 Ft.

Site history
- In use: Surveillance
- Materials: Stone

Sankshi Fort सांक्शी किल्ला This fort is located in Pen Taluka of Raigad district of Maharashtra. It is 9 kilometres (5.6 mi) from Pen.

== History ==
A Sank king built the fort. He had a daughter named Jagamata. The king was killed in battle, his daughter committed suicide by jumping from the fort; this is the popular myth. In 1540 Nizamshah of Ahmednagar captured this fort from Gujarath's sultan. The Sultan of Gujarat captured it back with the help of Portuguese. Later he assumed the Nizam were counter-attacking the fort, so he handed over the fort to the Portuguese and ran away to Gujarat. Due to frequent attacks on the army by the Nizam, the Portuguese purchased the fort along with Karnala fort from Nizam.

== Places of interest ==
There are no Bastions or Gate on the fort. But there are plenty of rock cut cisterns on the fort and a small cave. Climbing the fort is through rugged, rough rocky boulders. The Badruddin Darga at the base of the fort is worth visiting. There is a water cistern called Gajishah tank on the way to the top. From the top of this fort many forts like Karnala, Manikgad and Sagargad are seen.

== How to reach ==
The road from Tarankhop village on Mumbai-Goa National highway rightly takes to the Sankshi fort. The road from village Balawali is a tiresome walk of 1 hour Sankshi is a very small fort to climb, but hiring a guide from the nearby village is recommended. There are no proper steps or gate on the fort. There are two ways to climb the fort. The northern and the eastern way. It takes about 20 minutes to see the fort.

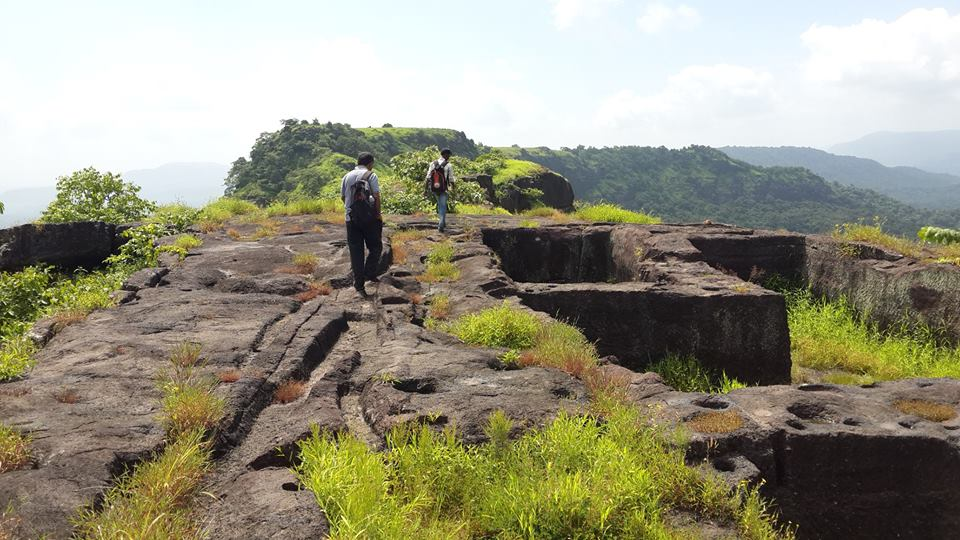
Rock cut cistern on the Fort

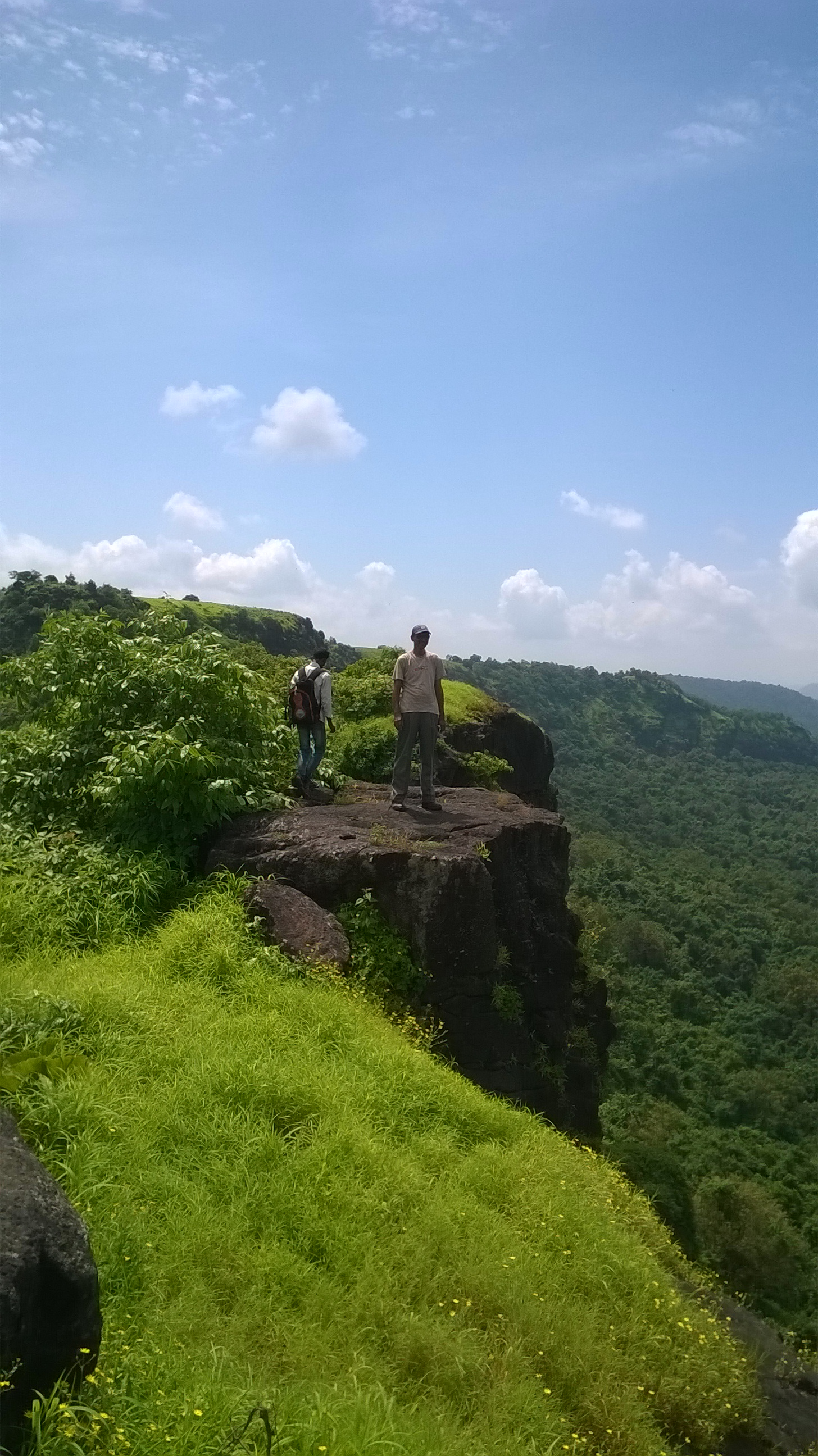
Top of the fort

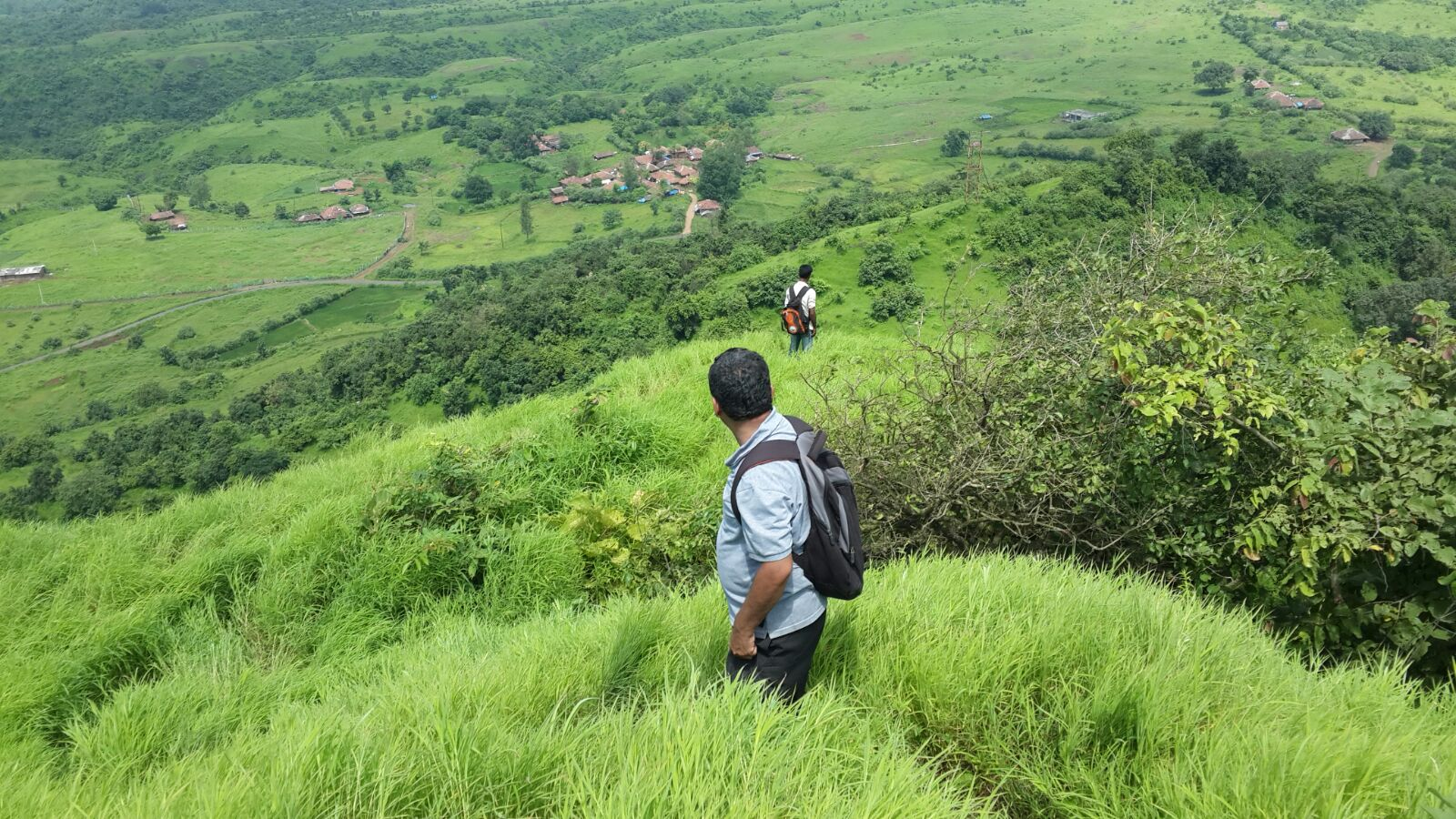
Way to the top of fort

== See also ==
- List of forts in Maharashtra
- List of forts in India
- Marathi People
- List of Maratha dynasties and states
- Maratha War of Independence
- Battles involving the Maratha Empire
- Maratha Army
- Maratha titles
- Military history of India
