= Sainagar =

Large Indian suburb of Panvel in Maharashtra

Sainagar is a large suburb of Panvel, located in Maharashtra, India. Sainagar has more than 5% of the population of the city of Panvel where more than 300,000 people live. It is close to the proposed Navi Mumbai International Airport, there is also an international exhibition center and an engineering college. Several developments are currently taking place and Panvel is located at 18.98° N 73.1° E[1]. It has an average elevation of 28 metres (91 feet). It is near to the Gadhi river.

The area postal PIN code is 410206.

== Education ==
There are more than 40 schools in the area, well known schools include:

- St. Joseph's High School, Kalamboli
- Dayanand Anglo Vedic Public School, New Panvel
- St. George High School
- St. Mary's High School
- Indian Institute of Geomagnetism, Panvel
- National Institute Of Fashion Technology (NIFT) are known for providing quality education.

== Proposed Navi Mumbai International Airport ==
The new Navi Mumbai International airport, which is to be built in the Kopra-Panvel area would be built through public-private partnership (PPP) — with private sector partner getting 74% equity while Airports Authority of India (AAI) and Maharashtra government (through City and Industrial Development Corporation or CIDCO) holding 13% each. The International Civil Aviation Organization (ICAO) has already given techno-feasibility clearance to the Navi Mumbai airport and central cabinet has cleared it.

== Tourist places ==
There are two large markets in the suburb and they provide mainly vegetables, medicines and household items. Nearby villages include Karjat, Karnala, Prabalgad and Ballaleshwar. Nearby landmarks include Elephanta Caves.

== Transport links ==
Panvel railway station comes under Mumbai Division of Central Railway. The station is divided into two parts for suburban and main lines. The main line station is located at Chainage 68/5 from Mumbai CST, while the suburban station is at 48/9. Both share the same building complex and staff members. The suburban complex currently has two operational platforms and two more are being constructed. The main line station has three operational platforms, and two more are being constructed.

The station handles more than 30 freight trains, 5 daily commuter passenger trains and 5 daily express trains stop here. In addition to this, 9 non-daily trains also stop at this station. Panvel is a very major station and is considered equivalent to Mumbai for trains which skip Mumbai. The trains run on Diesel Traction, and Panvel is a refueling point for their locomotives.

In addition to refueling, Panvel has a huge number of cargo, and most trains stop for periods varying from 5 minutes to 20 minutes to load and unload cargo. Panvel also handles crew change for freight trains. There are 4 ticket counters and 3 reservation counters. A state transport bus station is about 500 metres away from the train station. Buses run by Local Municipal Transport (NMMT) and rickshaws are available to rent. A new suburban railway station building is under construction, and no facilities are available for their passengers. The next nearest ones are Khandeshwar Manasarovar, Kharghar and Belapur.
