= National Highway 348 (India) =

National highway in India

National Highway 348
- Map of National Highway 348 in red

Route information
- Auxiliary route of NH 48
- Length: 28 km (17 mi)

Major junctions
- East end: Palaspe
- West end: Jawaharlal Nehru Port

Location
- Country: India
- States: Maharashtra

Highway system
- Roads in India; Expressways; National; State; Asian
← NH 48	→ NH 348

National Highway 348, commonly called JNPT Road or NH348, previously known as NH-4B is a 6 lane access controlled expressway in India. It is an upgrade of the four-lane NH-4B into a six-lane controlled access highway under JNPT port road connectivity project. NH-348 traverses the city of South Navi Mumbai, Maharashtra in India.

== Route ==
Palaspe - Jawaharlal Nehru Port Trust.

== Junctions ==
NH 48 Terminal near Palspe.

== See also ==
- Expressways of India
- List of expressways in Maharashtra
- List of national highways in India
- List of national highways in India by state
