= Mohpada =

Mohopada Wasambe
- Census town
- Location in Maharashtra, India
- Coordinates: 18.9098°N 73.1796°E
- Country: India
- State: Maharashtra
- District: Raigad

Population (2001)
  - Total: 8,735

Languages
  - Official: Marathi
- Time zone: UTC+5:30 (IST)
- Vehicle registration: MH 46 / Panvel

Mohopada, alias Wasambe, is a census town in Khalapur Taluka, Raigad district in the Indian state of Maharashtra.

== Demographics ==
As of 2001 India census, Mohopada Alias Wasambe had a population of 8735. Males constitute 54% of the population and females 46%. Mohopada Alias Wasambe has an average literacy rate of 76%, higher than the national average of 59.5%: male literacy is 80%, and female literacy is 71%. In Mohopada, 16% of the population is under 6 years of age.
