= Conference of the Americas on International Education =

Recurring education-policy event

The Conference of the Americas on International Education (CAIE) is an international conference that takes place once every 18 months within the Americas. It is organized by the Inter-American Organization for Higher Education, which has its headquarters in Montreal, Canada, and the CAIE General Secretariat is located there.

The conference brings together education decision-makers including university presidents, vice-presidents, directors and professors, academic researchers, international organizations, government officials and representatives from both the private and philanthropic sectors from the Americas and around the world. Discussions and debates at the conference, as well as through various webinars and collaborative projects, focus on issues related to internationalization and higher education within the Americas.

== Conference activities ==
Each conference includes a plenary debate on a preselected internationalization topic, a plenary interview with guest speakers, workshops with preset themes, a series of concurrent sessions at which research findings are presented, and networking sessions on specific topics.

== History ==
=== CAIE Calgary 2010 ===
The first edition of the CAIE was held in October 2010, in Calgary, Canada, and was organized by three founding organizations (IOHE, CONAHEC and CBIE). The theme of the conference was “Internationalization: An Essential Component of Quality Education of the 21st Century”. Topics included best practices, current trends, paradigm shifts, and aspects and challenges related to the internationalization of higher education. 650 participants from 44 countries attended plenary sessions and workshops, as well as the networking between the various organizations.

=== Formal organization ===
In 2011 representatives of a group of a number of national, regional, and inter-American university associations. signed a memorandum of understanding in Vancouver, Canada by the CAIE stakeholder organizations. This founding document defined the CAIE committees and their respective responsibilities.

=== CAIE Brazil 2012 ===
The second CAIE took place in Rio de Janeiro, Brazil, in April 2012, and continued with CAIE 2010's theme of internationalization with a particular focus on “Higher Education and the Inter-American Dialogues”. One topic of discussion was the international movement of students and educators between schools. The event attracted about 615 participants from 32 countries, About 300 higher education institutions, 40 national, regional and international university associations, and governmental agencies/authorities of eight countries were represented.

Speakers included Amaro Henrique Pessoa Lins, Secretary of Higher Education of the Brazilian Ministry of Education, Roberto de Souza Salles, President of the Universidade Federal Fluminense, and Marcia Rubio Correa, President of the Pontifica Universidad Católica del Perú and President of the IOHE. The CAIE 2012 also welcomed David Johnston, Governor General of Canada, Alvaro Toubes Prata, National Secretary for Technological Development and Innovation of Brazil, and Mexican writer Carlos Fuentes.

=== CAIE Mexico 2013 ===
The third CAIE was held the 16-18 of October, 2013, in Monterrey, Mexico, under the theme “Knowledge Mobility: Responsibility and Resources”. Seventy 70 conferences, workshops, and sessions were planned, and there were about 900 attendees.

=== Later conferences ===
The fourth conference took place in Quito Ecuador, in 2015. The fifth is planned for Montreal, Canada in 2017.
