= Karnala Fort =

Fort in India

Karnala fort
- Karnala, Maharashtra
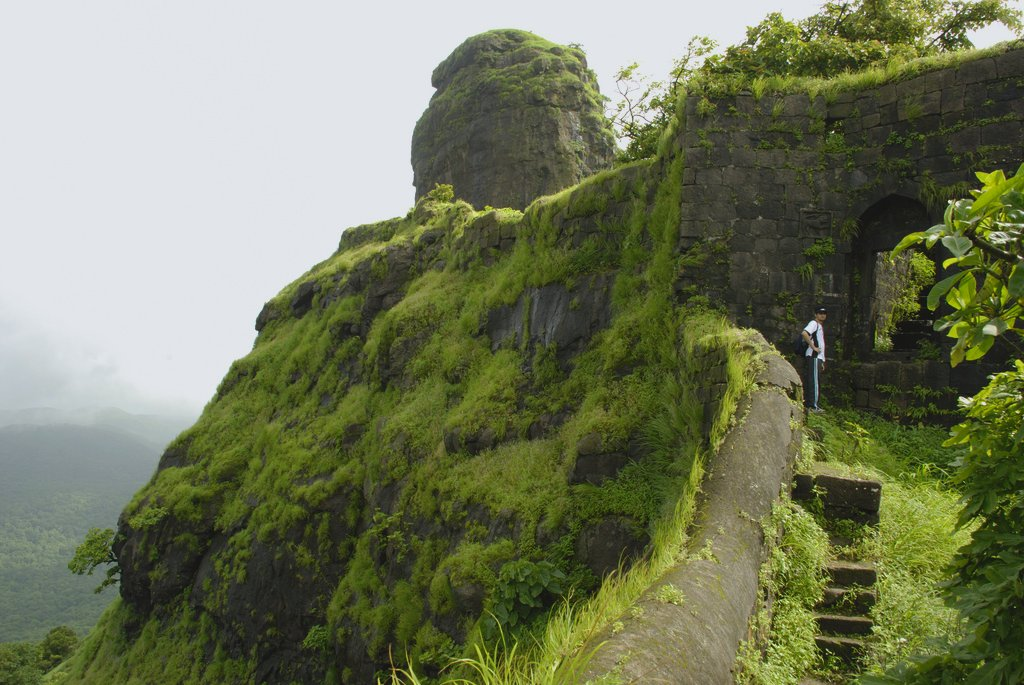
- Karnala fort entrance

Site information
- Type: Hill fort
- Owner: Government of India
- Controlled by: Ahmednagar sultanate, Portuguese, Marathas, British East India Company
- Open to the public: Yes from 6am to 6pm.
- Condition: Ruins

Location
- Shown within Maharashtra
- Location within Maharashtra
- Coordinates: 18°52′54″N 73°07′05″E
- Height: 439 m (1,440 ft) ASL

Site history
- Materials: Stone

Karnala Fort (also called Funnel Hill) is a hill fort in Raigad district, Maharashtra, India, about 10 km from Panvel city. Currently it is a protected place lying within the Karnala Bird Sanctuary. It was a place of strategic importance since it overlooked the Bor pass, which connected the Konkan coast to the interior of Maharashtra (Deccan Plateau) on the main trade route between these areas.

== History ==
The fort was likely constructed before 1400, under Devagiri Yadavs(1248–1318) and the Tughlaq rulers (1318–1347), Karnala was the capital of the north Konkan districts of their respective empires. It later fell under the command of the Gujarat Sultanate but in 1540 was taken over by Nizam Shah of Ahmednagar. The Gujarat sultans then requested the help of the Dom Francisco de Menenzes the commanding officer of the Portuguese at Bassien (modern day Vasai) to win it back. He ordered 500 of his soldiers to Karnala fort and they were able to capture it. The fort was left in charge of the Gujarat Sultanate but with Portuguese garrisons.

The Gujarat sultans fled to Vasai, surrendering the fort to the Portuguese. The loss of Karnala enraged Nizam Shah, who sent 5,000 men to reclaim the fort and the surrounding countryside. The attempt was unsuccessful, and the Portuguese continued to hold the fort. Deciding that the forts of Sangli and Karnala were of little strategic value, however, the Portuguese viceroy agreed to return them to Nizam Shah for an annual payment of Rs. 17,500 (or 5,000 gold Pardoas).

Chhatrapati Shivaji conquered it from the Mughals in 1670 by building breastworks as he advanced. After his death in 1680 it was taken over by Aurangzeb. After this the Mughals occupied it for some time after which it in 1740 with the rise of the Peshwas of Pune it went to them. It remained under the command of killedar (garrison commander) Anantrao until a colonel Prother won the fort and established the rule of the British East India Company there in 1818.

== Trekking to the Fort ==
Today, the ruins of the fort are a popular destination for hiking and tourism. There are two trails that lead to the fort - Karnala fort trail and nature trail. The Karnala fort trail trek is a 1 hour/2.69 kilometres trek from the bottom of the hill. There are 5 resting places on the pathway made by forest department. The final climbing steps near the entrance of the fort are made safe by iron railings. It is not advisable to cook food at the base of the pinnacle, as the smell of smoke irritates the Honey Bees. The water from the southernmost rock cut water cistern is potable. First aid is available at the forest guest house. The nature trail is a shorter (1.20 kilometre) and a steeper approach to the fort.

== Major features ==
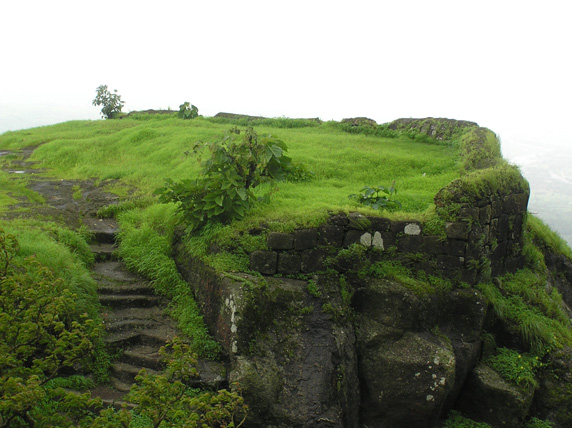
Karnala fort bastion with steps

Karnala fort actually consists of two forts one at a higher level and other lower. At the centre of the higher level is a 125 feet high basalt pillar. It is also called Pandu's tower. This structure was used as watchtower when the fort was occupied however now it is in a ruined condition. The presence of bee hives also makes it difficult to climb and have resulted in at least one casualty in recent times. There is a water cistern which provides fresh water all year long. From the top the forts of Prabalgad, Manikgad, Haji Malang, Chanderi fort, Matheran, Sankshi fort, Dronagiri fort, and Rajmachi are clearly visible.

The fort has two inscriptions one in Marathi and the other in Persian. The Marathi inscription which has no date is seen on the lower gate on the inner side. Its words are indecipherable. The Persian writing is on upper gate reads "Syed Nuruddin Muhammad Khan, Hijri, 1147 AH (1735 CE)" and probably dates from the Mughal occupation of the fort. This rock cut inscription has been removed by some miscreants long back.

Bhavani Temple

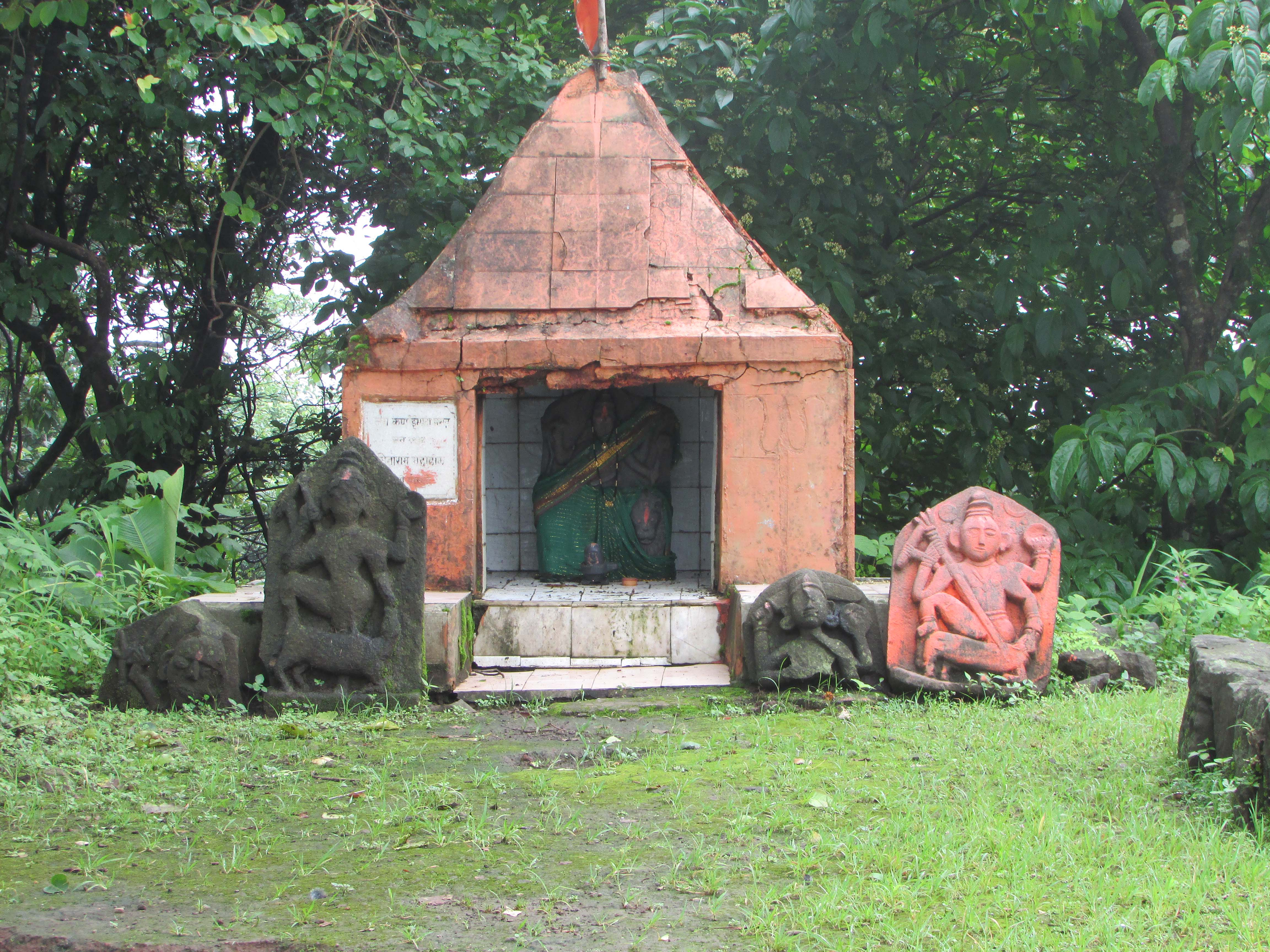
Bhavani Temple at the bottom of Karnala fort.

There is a temple dedicated to goddess Bhavani located at the bottom of the fort. It is said that the goddess gave a sword to king Chhatrapati Shivaji, which he then used to conquer a vast area of land for the establishment of a Hindu nation.

== Images of the fort ==
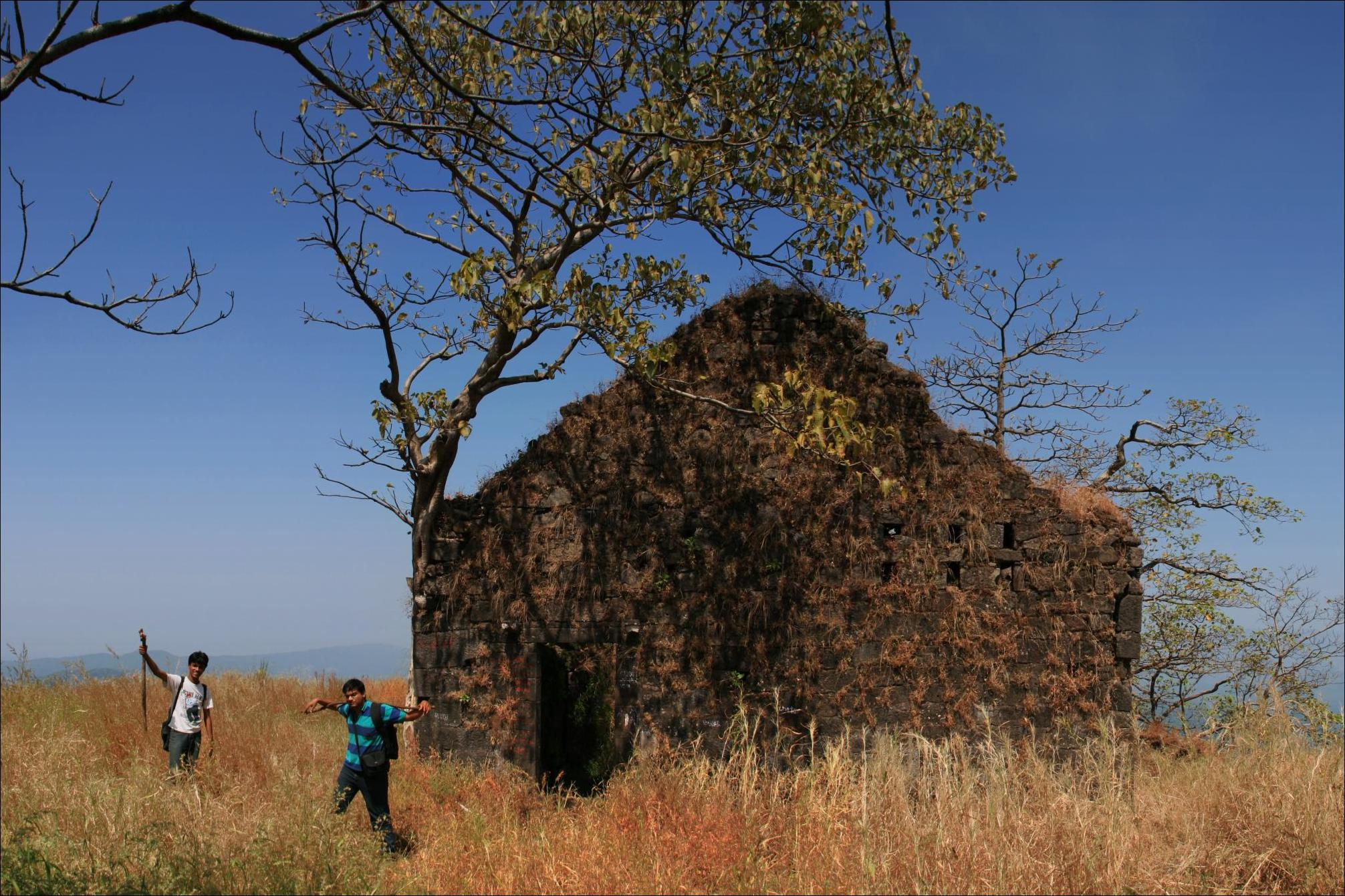
Ruins inside the fort

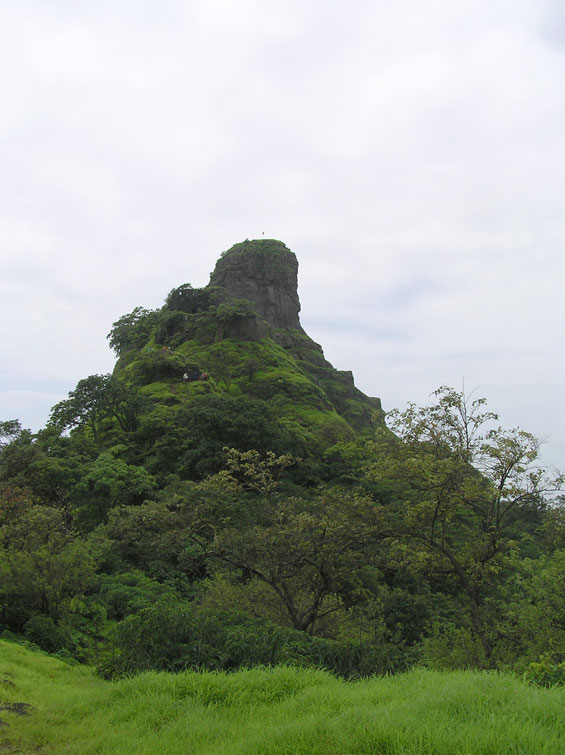
Karnala tower

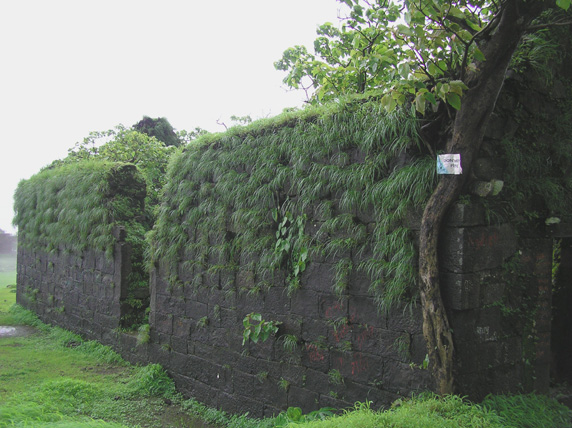
Karnala fort walls

The summit at dusk

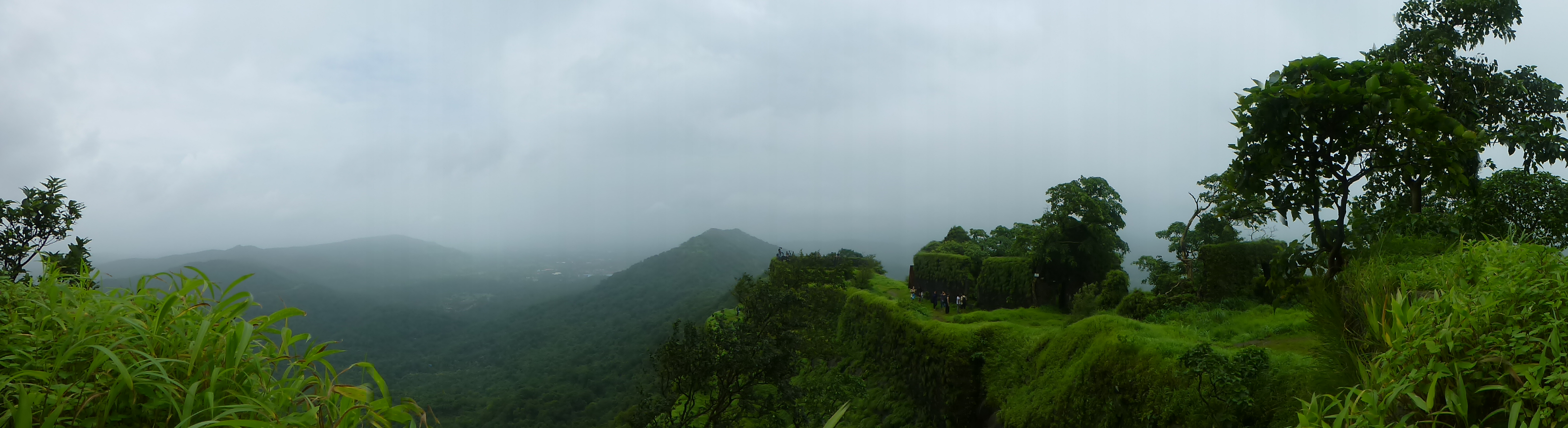
Panorama view of Karnala Fort

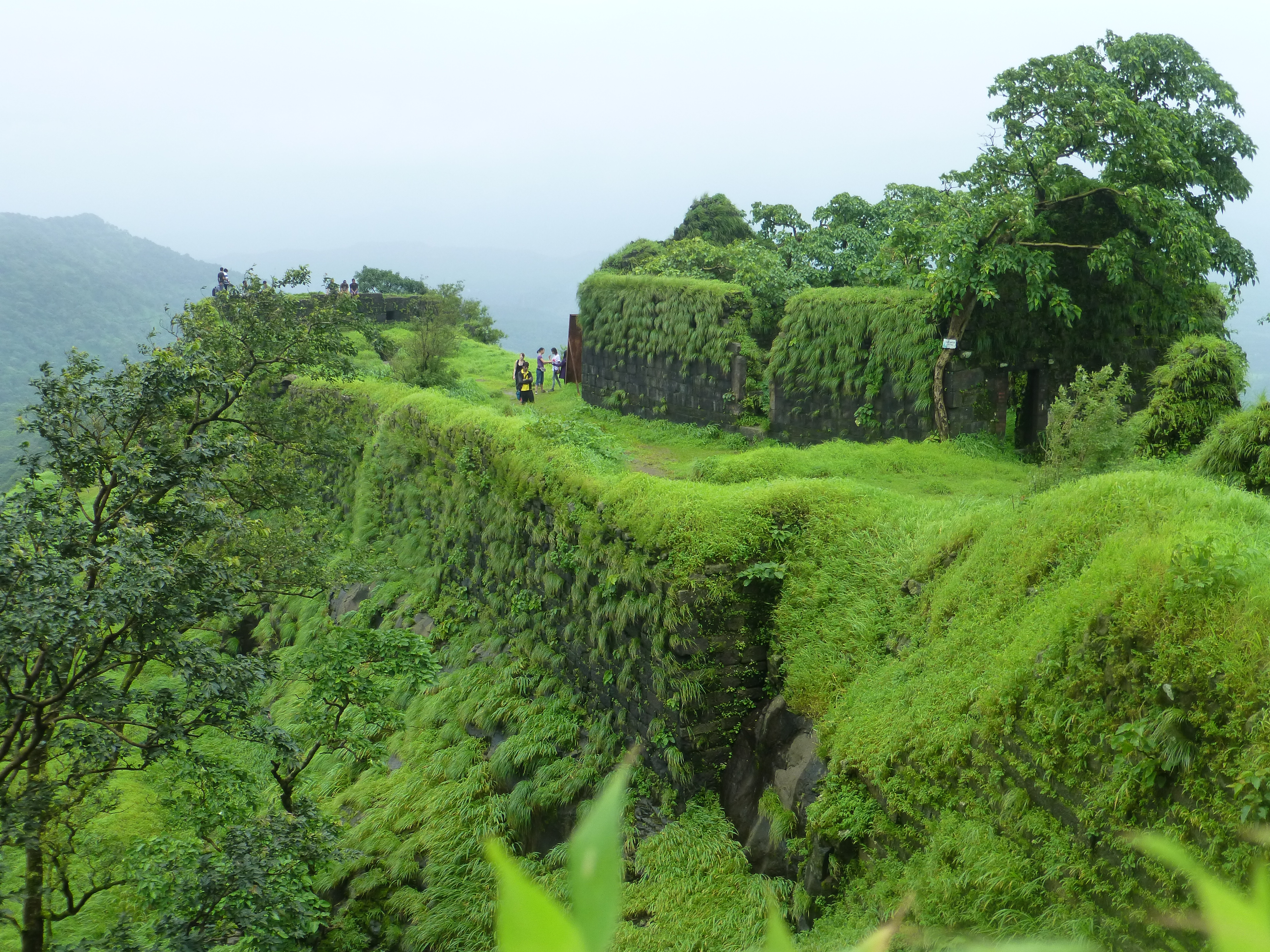
Karnala Fort in rainy season

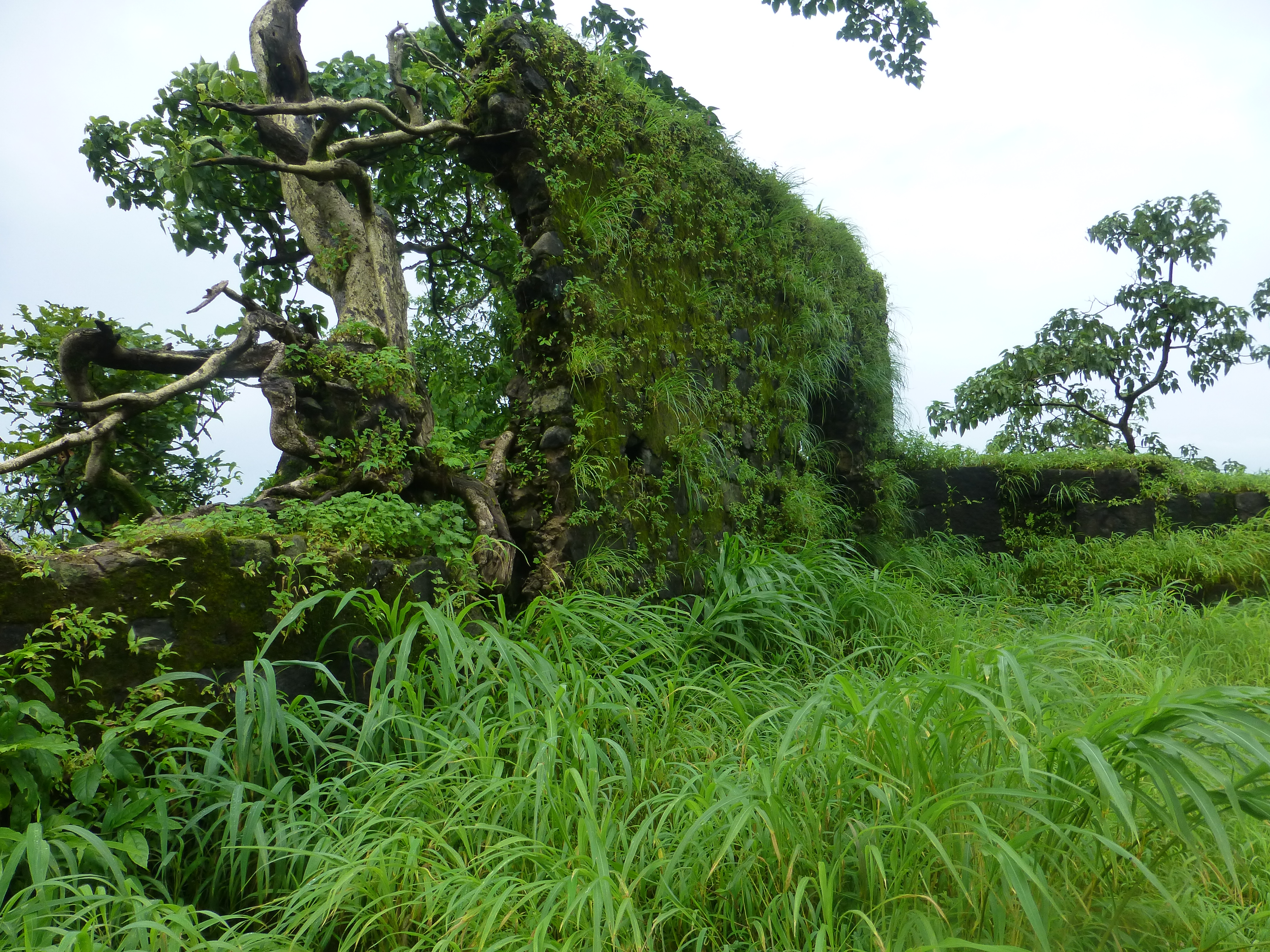
Remains of Karnala Fort

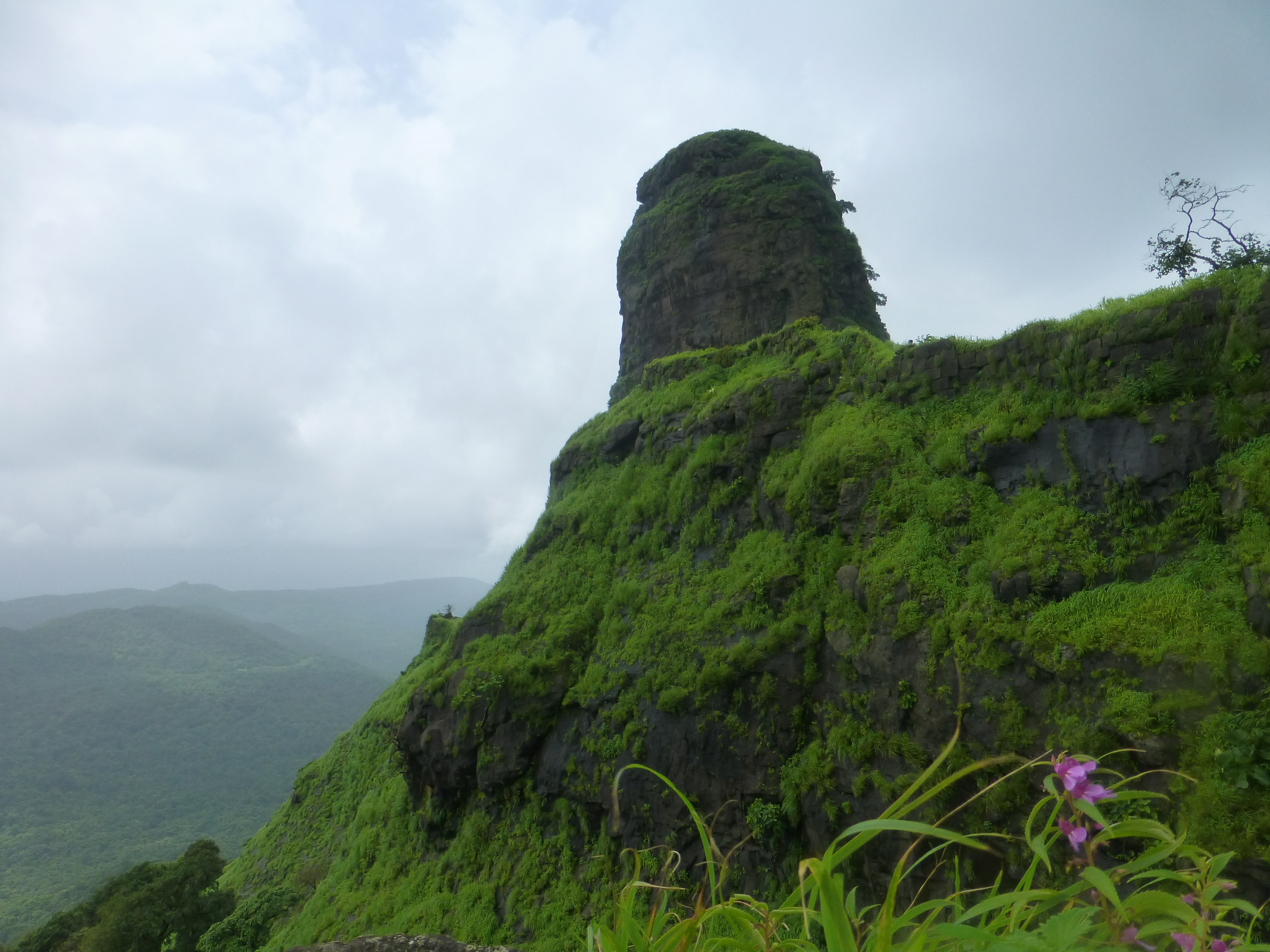
Side view of Karnala Tower

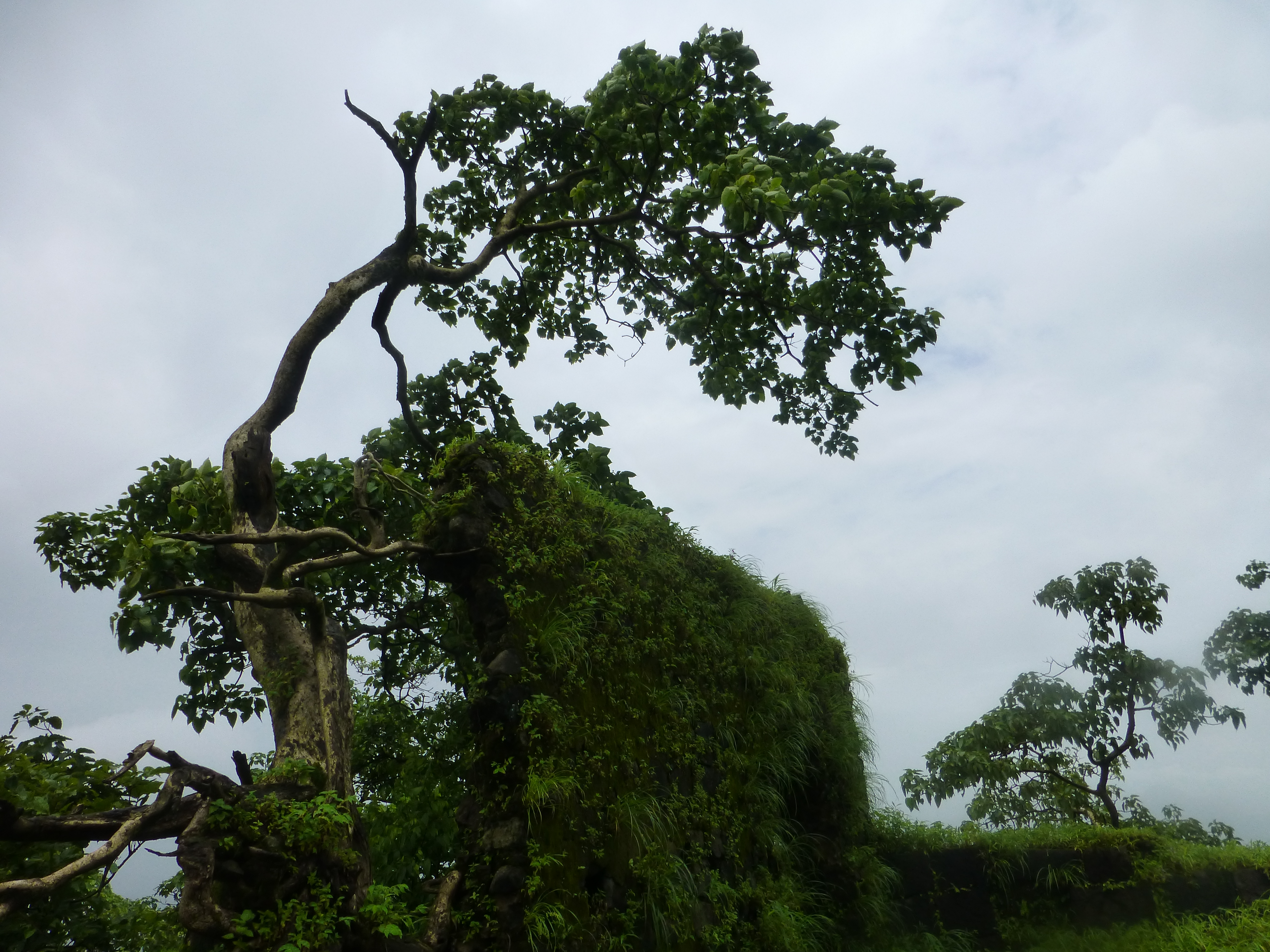
Tree grown in remains of Karnala Fort
