= Khopoli =

- City; Mumbai Metropolitan Region
- Nickname: City Of Waterfalls
- Location in Maharashtra, India
- Coordinates: 18.789°N 73.343°E
- Country: India
- State: Maharashtra
- District: Raigad
- Elevation: 61 m (200 ft)

Population (2011)
  - Total: 108,648
- Demonym: Khopolikar

Language
  - Official: Marathi
- Time zone: UTC+5:30 (IST)
- PIN: 410203 410204 410216
- Vehicle registration: MH-46

Khopoli (Marathi pronunciation: [kʰopoˈliː], ISO: Khōpōlī) is a city in the Khalapur taluka of Raigad district, in the Indian state of Maharashtra, at the base of the Sahyadri mountains. Patalganga River, which is the tailrace channel of the Tata Hydroelectric Power Station, flows through Khopoli.

It is a municipal council and is a part of the Mumbai Metropolitan Region. Khopoli Municipal Council covers an area of 30 km^{2} (12 sq mi).

Khopoli is served by a railway station connected to the Mumbai suburban railway by a single line from Karjat. The distance between CSMT to Khopoli is 114.24 km (70.99 mi) along the Central Railway Suburban Line, which is a broad gauge line carrying electric locomotives.

Initially, Khopoli railway station had only one platform for both the up and down movement of local trains. In 2019, it was revamped with an additional platform.

It is also located on NH 4, about 80 km (50 mi) south of Mumbai and 80 km (50 mi) from Pune. Industries are well developed due to the strategic importance of the region as the Mumbai-Pune Expressway passes through the city. The city is called a city of waterfalls due to a number of waterfalls in the rainy season. Due to the presence of industries, the city has attracted migrants from across India. It is an industrial city with numerous industries and power plants located across it. Khopoli is located at the base of the Sahyadri Mountains range on the banks of the Patalganga river. This place also has several waterfalls, parks and hill stations. Because of its natural environment and scenery, Khopoli is a major spot for tourist attractions. Khopoli is connected with metro cities like Mumbai and Pune by rail and road. Imagica Theme Park, KP Falls and Zenith waterfall are the key attraction of this place. Khopoli is surrounded by tourist places like Khandala and Lonavala. The place has proximity to railway stations and bus stands. Also, cabs and rickshaws are common means of transport in Khopoli. The nearest airport is Chhatrapati Shivaji Maharaj Airport, which is 80 km away. Khopoli has several industrial hubs, MIDCs, and heavy industries which provide employment to the residents of this area. Khopoli is home to various steel, chemical and food and pulp industries.

Khopoli is home to various Marathi, English, Hindi and even international schools. It has seen rapid growth in industry.

== Geography and history ==
Khopoli was called Campoolie during the British Raj. Khopoli is located at 18°45' N, 73°20' E. It is situated at about 61 m above mean sea level. It falls under three Pincodes - Khopoli 410203, Khopoli Power House 410204 and Jagdish Nagar 410216. STD code for Khopoli is (0)2192.

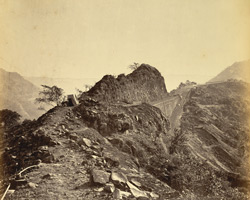
Bor Ghat

A colonial source describes Khopoli as follows:

The Bhor ghat is formed of a succession of lofty eminences, towering above each other, the last of which attains a height of 2000 feet (610 m) above the level of the sea. Its outline at a distance is bold and imposing; it presents a plane or table summit, with ranges of stupendous hills beyond, with the sublimity of which Europe possesses little that is analogous; at its foot stands the small and romantic village of Campolee, which has a noble tank and a Hindu temple, both built by Nana Furanvese (the Peishwa's prime minister) at his individual expense.

There was an annachatra or a free feeding house, in the vicinity of the Mahadev temple, but by 1882 all that remained of it were huge grinding stones. The GIPR line was extended to Khopoli in 1856.

Khopoli is the site of the first privately owned hydroelectric power station in India built by the Tatas.

== Climate ==
Khopoli has a tropical monsoon climate (Am) with little to no rainfall from November to May and extremely heavy rainfall from June to September with moderately heavy showers in October.

Climate data for Khopoli
Month	Jan	Feb	Mar	Apr	May	Jun	Jul	Aug	Sep	Oct	Nov	Dec	Year
Mean daily maximum °C (°F)	29.7 (85.5)	30.8 (87.4)	33.0 (91.4)	34.6 (94.3)	35.0 (95.0)	32.6 (90.7)	29.8 (85.6)	29.6 (85.3)	30.2 (86.4)	32.4 (90.3)	32.0 (89.6)	30.7 (87.3)	31.7 (89.1)
Daily mean °C (°F)	23.2 (73.8)	24.2 (75.6)	26.9 (80.4)	29.2 (84.6)	30.5 (86.9)	29.2 (84.6)	27.2 (81.0)	26.9 (80.4)	27.0 (80.6)	27.7 (81.9)	25.9 (78.6)	24.0 (75.2)	26.8 (80.3)
Mean daily minimum °C (°F)	16.8 (62.2)	17.6 (63.7)	20.8 (69.4)	23.8 (74.8)	26.0 (78.8)	25.8 (78.4)	24.7 (76.5)	24.2 (75.6)	23.8 (74.8)	23.0 (73.4)	19.9 (67.8)	17.4 (63.3)	22.0 (71.6)
Average precipitation mm (inches)	0 (0)	0 (0)	0 (0)	4 (0.2)	25 (1.0)	618 (24.3)	1,695 (66.7)	1,182 (46.5)	522 (20.6)	125 (4.9)	13 (0.5)	3 (0.1)	4,187 (164.8)

== Demographics ==
In the 2011 India census, Khopoli had a population of 108,648. Males constitute 53% of the population and females 47%. Khopoli has an average literacy rate of 74%, higher than the national average of 59.5%. Male literacy is 80%, and female literacy is 68%. Thirteen per cent of the population is under 6 years of age.

Religion in Khopoli (2011)
Religion	Percent
Hinduism	71.66%
Islam	14.55%
Buddhism	10.47%
Jainism	1.40%
Christianity	1.00%
Others	0.91%

== Industries ==
The factories in Khopoli municipal limits are:

- Alta Laboratories Limited, a bulk chemical manufacturer and a pioneer and still India's largest producer of salicylic acid and its various derivatives.
- AMNS Khopoli Limited
- Bohler-Uddeholm India Limited
- Bombay Oxygen Limited
- Delta Cooling Towers Pvt. Ltd.
- Godrej and Boyce Mfg Co. Ltd.
- Government Milk Scheme, Khopoli
- India Steel Works Limited, Bright Bar Division
- Innovassynth Technologies Limited (Formerly Indian Organic Chemicals)
- Isibars Limited, Special Steels Division
- Mahindra Sanyo Pvt Ltd
- Mohan Rockey Spring Water Breweries Limited
- Paper & Pulp Conversions Ltd (PAPCO), a pioneering paper & paperboard mill started by industrialist Baburaoji Parkhe. The first industry in Khopoli which brought electricity to the town. Started operations in Khopoli in 1949 and closed down in 1990.
- SANPlast PVT LTD Limited
- Tata Hydro Electric Power Supply Company Limited
- Tata steel BSL
- Wärtsilä India Limited. Wärtsilä Corp, its parent company, is a Finland-based equipment provider; it plans to convert this unit into a global manufacturing and sourcing unit.
- Wheelabrator Alloy Castings Limited
- Zenith Steel Pipes Limited

== Educational institutions ==
Various institutions run schools, colleges and a polytechnic.

=== Khalapur Taluka Shikshan Prasarak Mandal ===
Khalapur Taluka Shikshan Prasarak Mandal runs the following institutions in Khopoli:

1. Yak Public School (English Medium School CBSE affiliated)
2. Maharashtra IAS/MPSC Academy
3. Jagdish Chandra Mahindra Memorial School
4. Shishu Mandir Khopoli (English Medium School)
5. Vasant Deshmukh Memorial school and college
6. Janata Vidyalaya Junior College
7. Janata Vidyalaya (Marathi Medium School)
8. Khopoli Hindi Vidyalaya (Hindi Medium School)
9. K. M. C. College (affiliated to Mumbai University)
10. Khopoli Polytechnic
11. Sahyadri Vidyalaya
12. Zenith High School (English Medium School)
13. Gagangiri English International School, Khopoli
14. Anand Shala, Khopoli

== Culture, religion, and tourism ==
Khopoli has a "fine oval shaped reservoir" and a temple of God Mahadev as Vireshwar built by Nana Phadnavis. The reservoir is built of solid and strong black rock and is oval shaped. The circumference of the reservoir is about 1207 m and it covers an area of about 75000 sq m. The reservoir holds excellent water throughout the year. The reservoir has surrounding walls also built in stone and are of a width of about 1.5 m to 1.8 m. The reservoir has stone steps leading to the water. The temple is of a height of about 22.9 m m from the base to the top and the foundation measures 12.2 m x 6.1 m. Inside is the image of God Shiva. The Sabha mandap measures about 6.1 m x 3.1 m. At the entrance of the temple is a samadhi. A fair is held in honor of the temple deity on Mahashivaratri day - Maagha Vadya 13.

The PAPCO Mill complex has a Parashurama temple and Fire temple or Agni Mandir which was built in 1971. The Gagangiri Maharaj Ashram is located in Khopoli, it is there that Gagangiri Maharaj died on 4 February 2008.

The Akhil Bharatha Ayyappa Seva Sangham, includes the Ayyappa Temple, in its list of Ayyappa temples in India and abroad.

The major tourist attractions in the city include Adlabs Imagica, which is India's largest theme park. Mahad Ganpati Temple, Zenith Waterfalls, and Gangangiri Maharaj Ashram Lonavala is just 8 km away from the city.

== Notable people ==
- Raghunath Vaman Dighe (1896–1980), Marathi writer
