= Patalganga River =

River in India

The Patalganga River (Marathi: पाताळगंगा नदी) is an Indian river that rises in the steep western scarps of the Matheran uplands where it branches off from the main ridge near Khopoli and maintains a general westward flow till it joins the Dharamtar Creek with a wide estuary. The tail-waters of the Khopoli power project are let into the river near Khopoli in Maharashtra. It comes at foremost in terms of pollution. It is one of the most polluted rivers of Maharashtra, source being from Patalganga MIDC. Industries in Patalganga MIDC include (see the site). These companies contribute polluting the river. MPCB provides no proper data regarding water quality which is a point which limits the protests from various NGO's and locals. Nowadays, locals from villages on banks of patalganga river (Turade, Kalivali, Apta, Dushmi, Kharpada, Rave) complain about the poisoning caused by consuming fishes. Biodiversity of the river is under serious threat due to the harmful chemicals from the dyeing, fertilizer, pesticides, insecticides, alkyl amines industries. Effect of pollution on farming: Crops get burnt due to highly acidic pH of water. Flooding during rainy season results in the flushing of agricultural lands downstream with harmful chemicals which makes land unsuitable for cultivation.

18.48°N 73.4°E
