= Karnala Bird Sanctuary =

Bird sanctuary in India

- IUCN category IV (habitat/species management area)
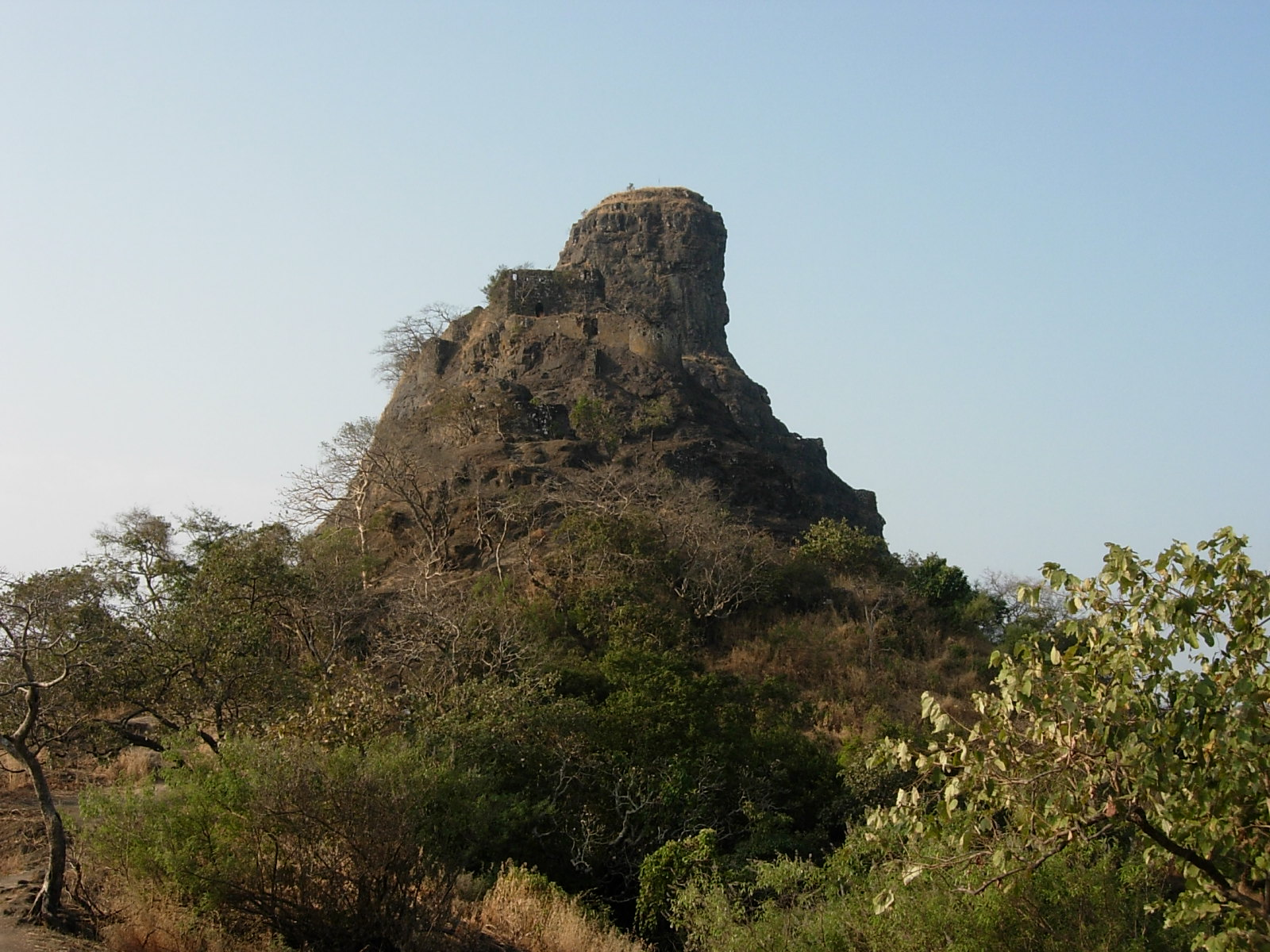
- The Karnala fort pinnacle, around which the sanctuary is located

- Location within Maharashtra Location within India
- Interactive map of Karnala Bird Sanctuary
- Location: Panvel taluka, Raigad District, Maharashtra, India
- Nearest city: Panvel and Khopoli
- Coordinates: 18°54′31″N 73°6′9″E
- Area: 446 km^{2} (172 sq mi)
- Governing body: Maharashtra State Forest Department

The Karnala Bird Sanctuary is located in Panvel Taluka of Raigad District, outside Mumbai, India near Matheran and Karjat. It is the first bird sanctuary in Maharashtra. The sanctuary is quite small with an area of 12.11 square kilometres but is, along with the Sanjay Gandhi National Park and Tungareshwar Wildlife Sanctuary, one of the few sanctuaries to be within reach of the city of Mumbai.

== Location ==
The sanctuary is centered on the historic Karnala Fort and lies just off the Mumbai-Pune national highway to Goa. It is located 12 km from Panvel. The nearest railhead is Panvel. Regular buses at an interval of 30 minutes are available from Panvel Bus Stand from 5:00 am to 8:00 pm. The sanctuary is open for visitors from 7am to 3pm. There are many hotels and resorts located near the sanctuary. There are two government rest houses inside the sanctuary area.

== About ==
The bird sanctuary is a popular destination for bird-watchers and hikers in the Mumbai area. The sanctuary is home to over 222 species birds of which 161 are resident species, 46 are winter migrant species, three are breeding migrants, seven species are passage migrants and five species are vagrant. Following eight species endemic to Western Ghats has been found in Karnala: Grey-fronted Green-pigeon (Treron affinis), Nilgiri Woodpigeon (Columba elphinstonii), Malabar (Blue-winged) Parakeet (Psittacula columboides), Malabar Grey Hornbill (Ocyceros griseus), White-cheeked Barbet (Megalaima viridis), Malabar Lark (Galerida malabarica), Small Sunbird (Leptocoma minima) and Vigor's Sunbird (Aethopyga vigorsii). Five rare birds, the ashy minivet, three-toed kingfisher, Malabar trogon, Slaty-legged Crake (Rallina eurizonoides), and Rufous-bellied Eagle (Lophotriorchis kienerii) have been sighted here. The Sanctuary is also an Important Bird Area (IBA) satisfying A1 (Globally threatened species) and A2 (Restricted-range species) criteria. The sanctuary is also home to 114 species of butterflies.

The Karnala fort is located on the top of the hill in the sanctuary. It is about 1hr. medium hard trek to Karnala fort.

There was a sighting of a leopard at Karnala.

== Gallery ==
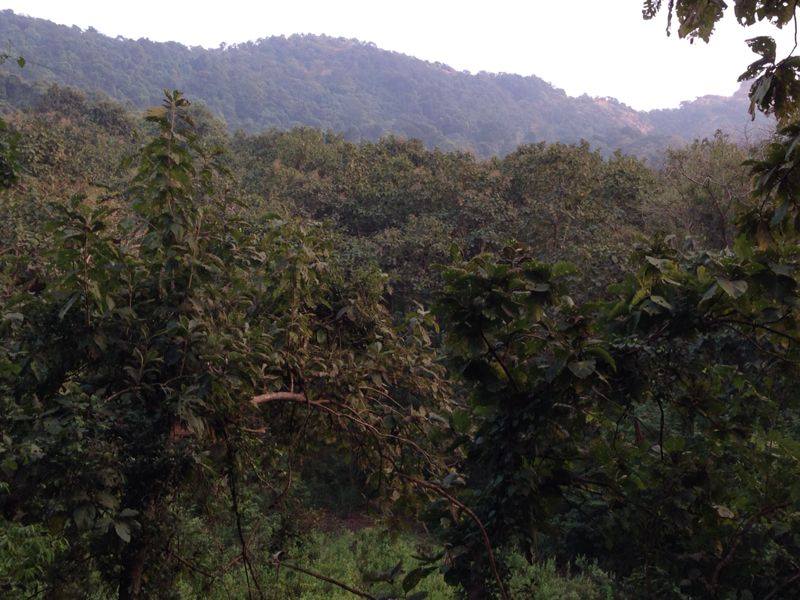
Sanctuary

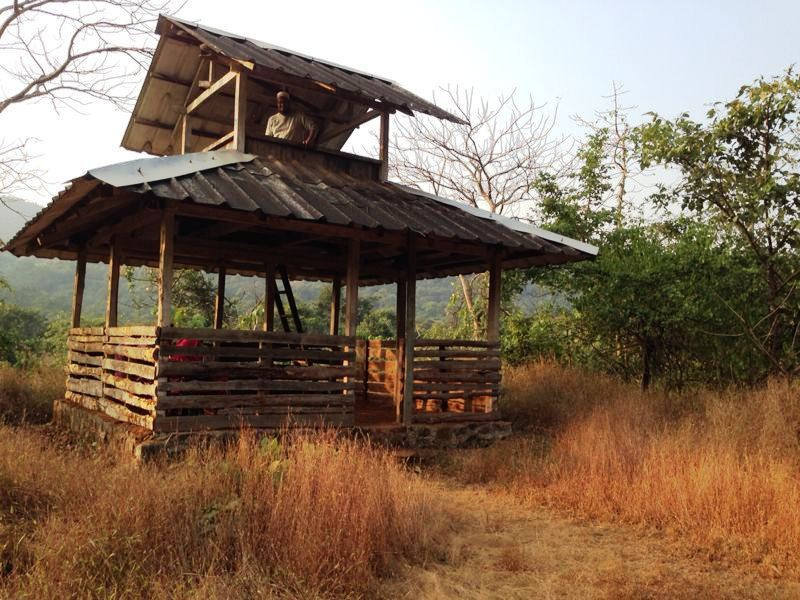
Bird view tower

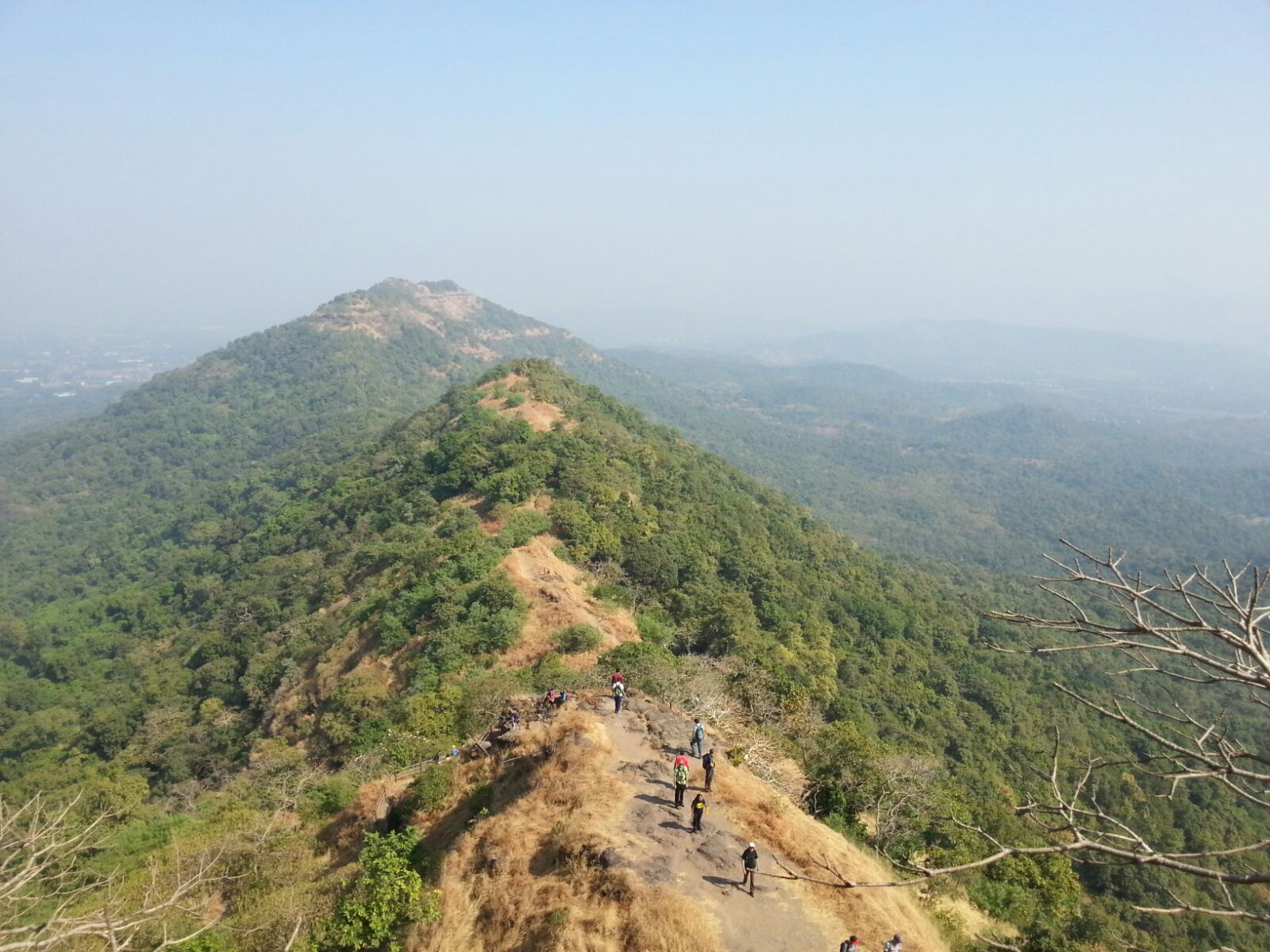
Forest from the top of fort
