= Avchitgad =

Fort in Maharashtra, India

Avchitgad Fort
- Raigad district, Maharashtra
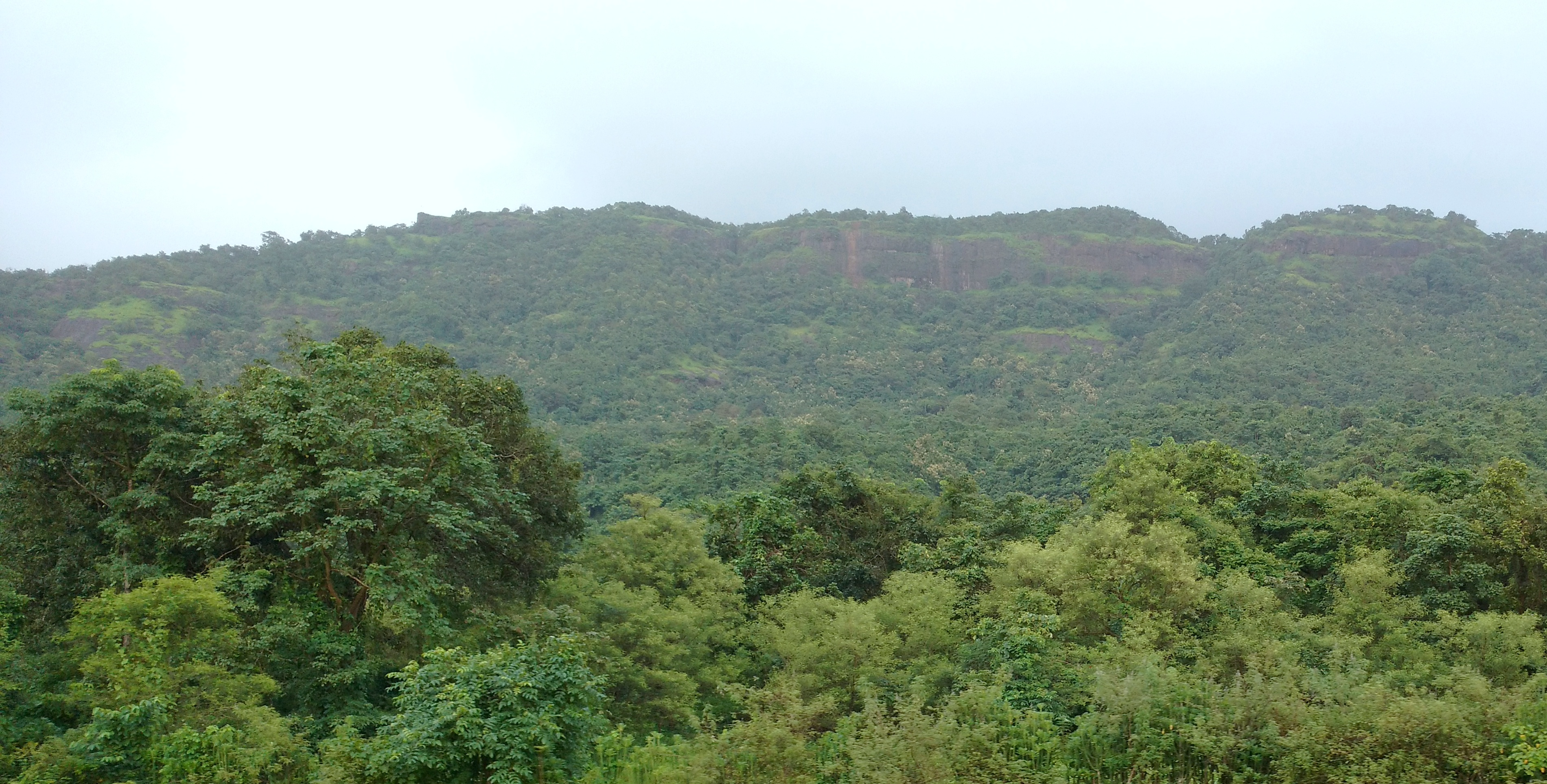
- Fort from Nidi Railway stn.

Site information
- Type: Hill fort
- Owner: Government of India
- Open to the public: Yes
- Condition: Ruins

Location
- Shown within Maharashtra
- Coordinates: 18°28′26.8″N 73°07′07.1″E
- Height: 300 M (977 Ft)

Site history
- Materials: Stone
- Difficulty: Easy

Avchitgad is a fort located in the Sahyadri ranges of Maharashtra. The fort is situated near Roha in the Raigad district. At the base of this fort is a village called Medha and Padam - Kharapti.

== History ==
This fort is believed to be built by Shilahar kings and subsequently used by the Nizam of Ahmednagar. The great Maratha king Chhatrapati Shivaji is also believed to have reconstructed this fort. The work was carried out in a hurry and hence the name 'Avchit' (hurry) 'gad' (fort). In the Third Anglo-Maratha War, this fort was won over by Colonel Prother from the Peshwas in February 1818 along with other forts in the neighboring region.

== How to reach ==
The approximate height of this fort is 977 feet. The nearest railway station is Roha and Nidi. The Padam - Kharapti, Pingalsai and Medha village are well accessible by road. There are three routes to reach the fort. One route starts from the village Padam - Kharapti, Another route starts from the village Pingalsi, it takes 2 hours to reach the fort and the other route is from village Medha, which takes about 1hr. to reach the fort top. It is a fairly easy trek from Padam - Kharapti, the route passes through the jungle up to the fort. the route from Padam - Kharapti is good for Trekking and hiking here the villagers are really co-operative, The route from Padam - Kharapti is Jungle lore and enjoying. The route from Medhe village begins from a big well called "Haud". The water from this well is potable. Both the routes meet at a saddle-shaped hill. There is a small Devi temple at the col. From the top of the fort there are views of the neighboring forts of Talagad, Telbaila, Sarasgad, Ghangad, Sudhagad, Raigad and Savashnagad.

== Places to visit ==
The fort has a large dodecagonal-shaped cistern which was used mainly for bathing and washing purposes. Nearby this cistern there are 6 smaller cisterns which have potable water. A small temple of the Pingalsai goddess is also situated atop. The main gate is also in good condition. There are four cannons on the top of the fort. There are two good bastions one at the northern end and the other at the southern end. There is an inscription on the southern bastion which says " Shri ganeshayanama Shri jayadev shake 1718 Nal Nam samvatsarae Chaitra shudha pratipada"

There is a dense forest around the entire fort with leopards, monkeys, and foxes.

== See also ==
- List of forts in Maharashtra
- Roha

== Gallery ==
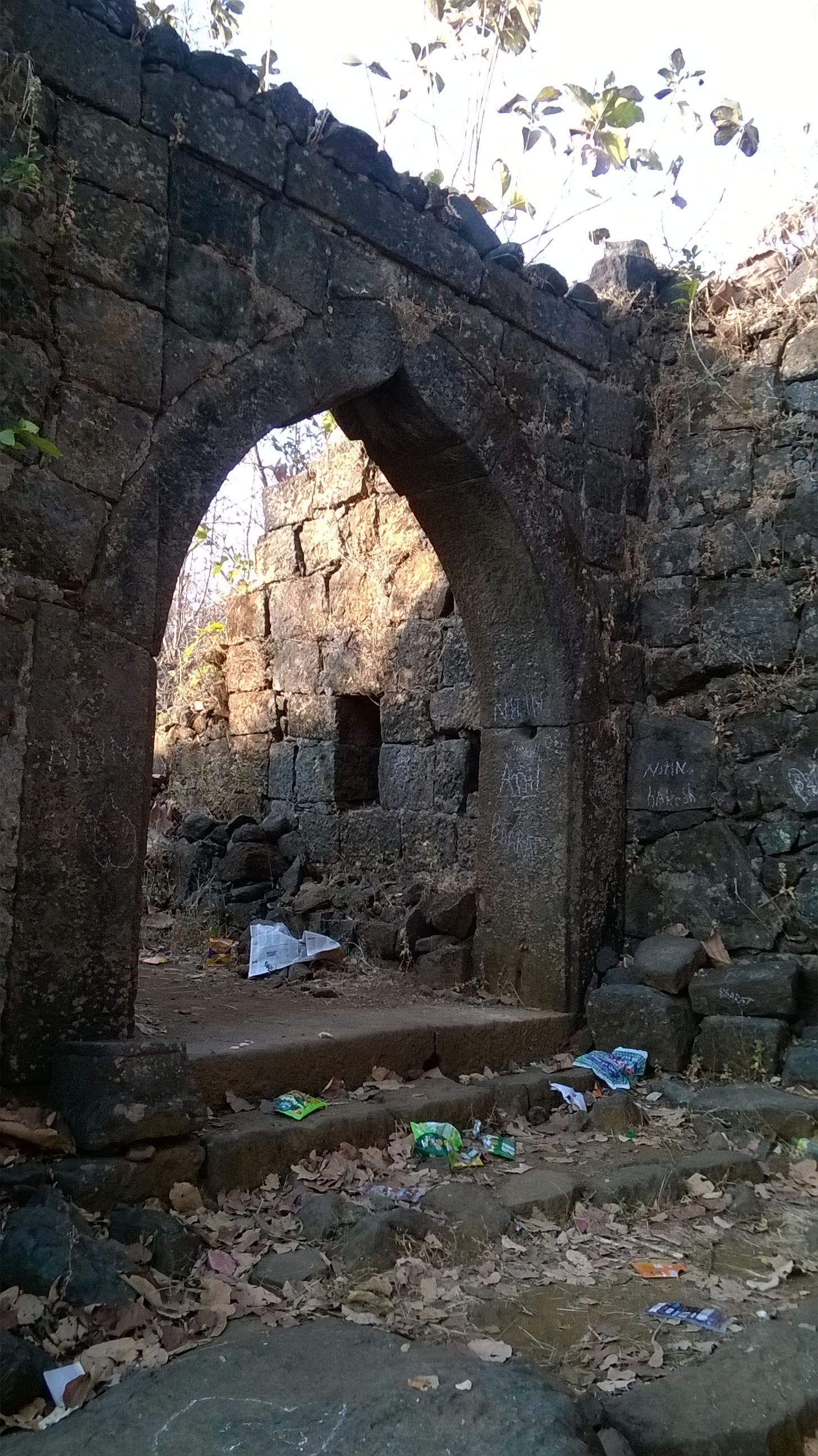
Main gate

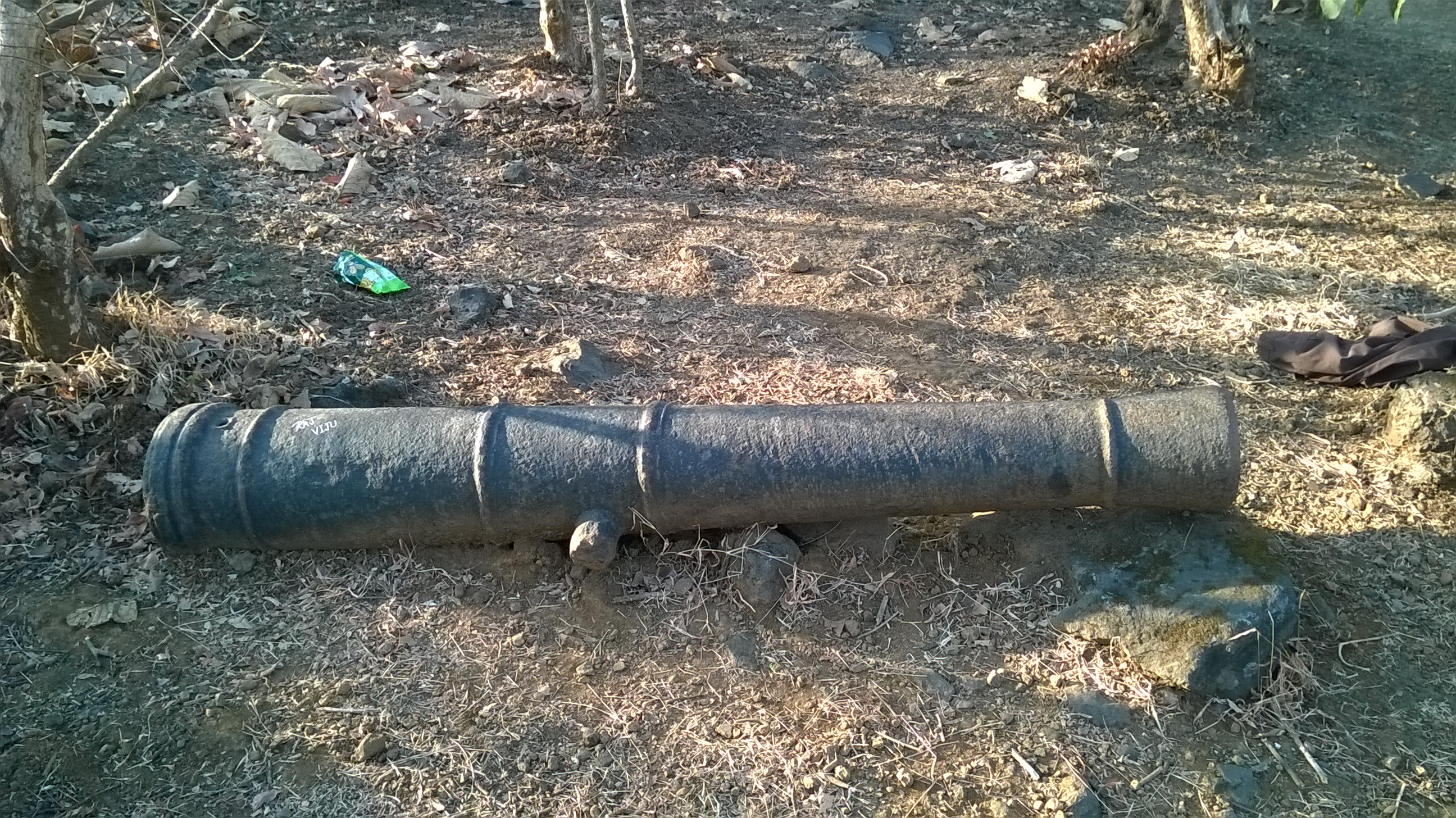
Cannon at the fort

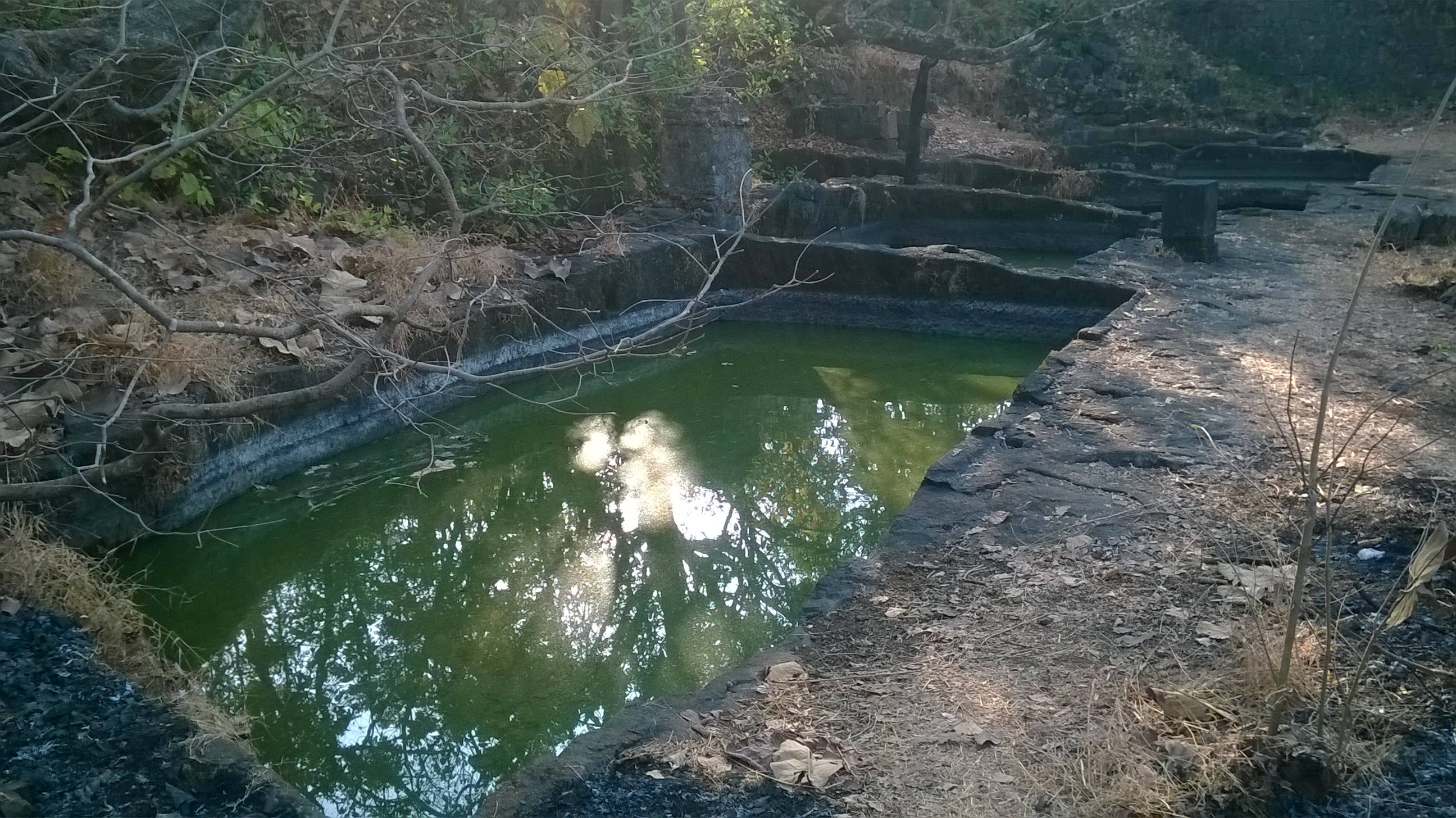
Rock cut cistern

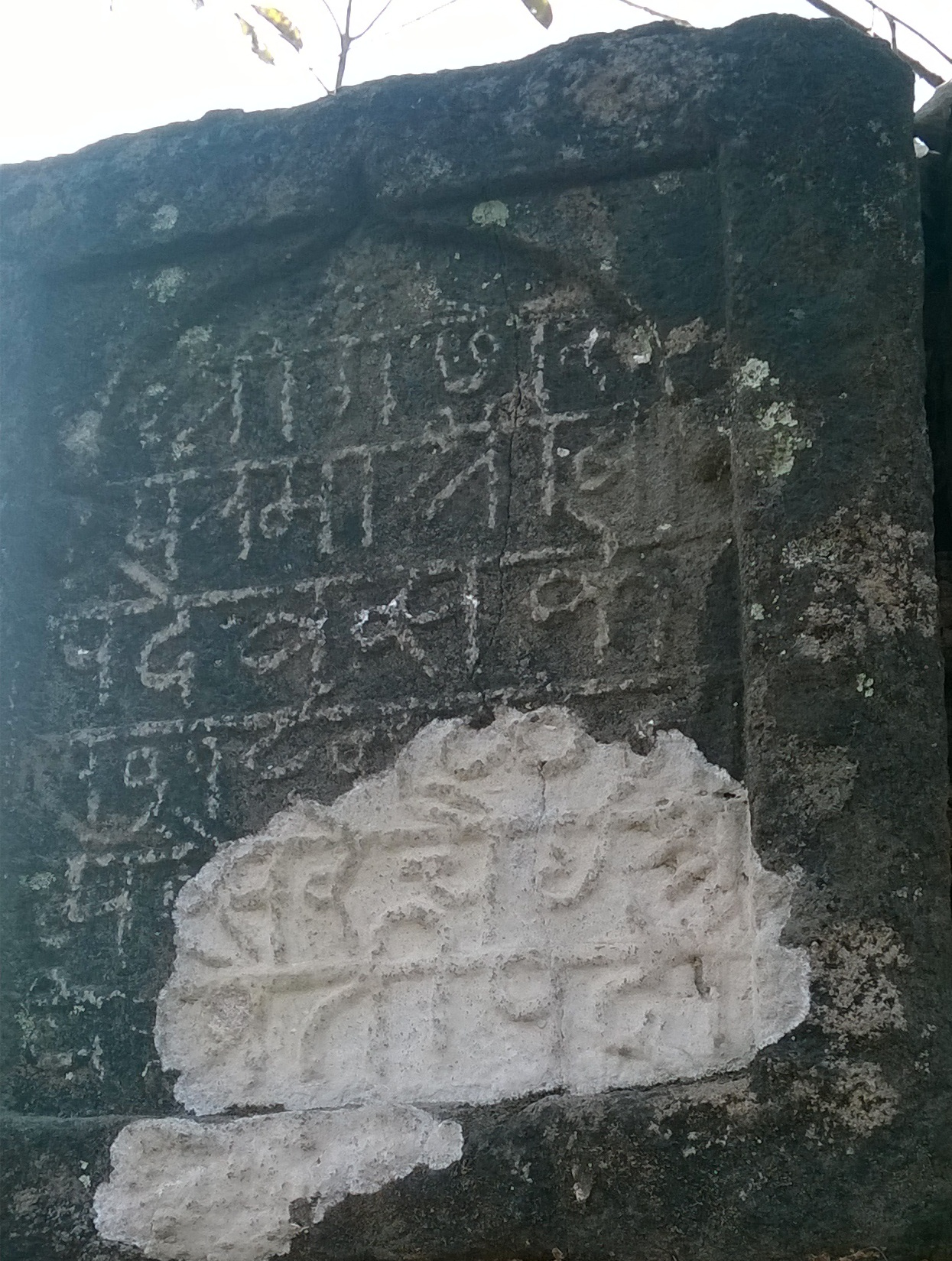
Inscription on rock

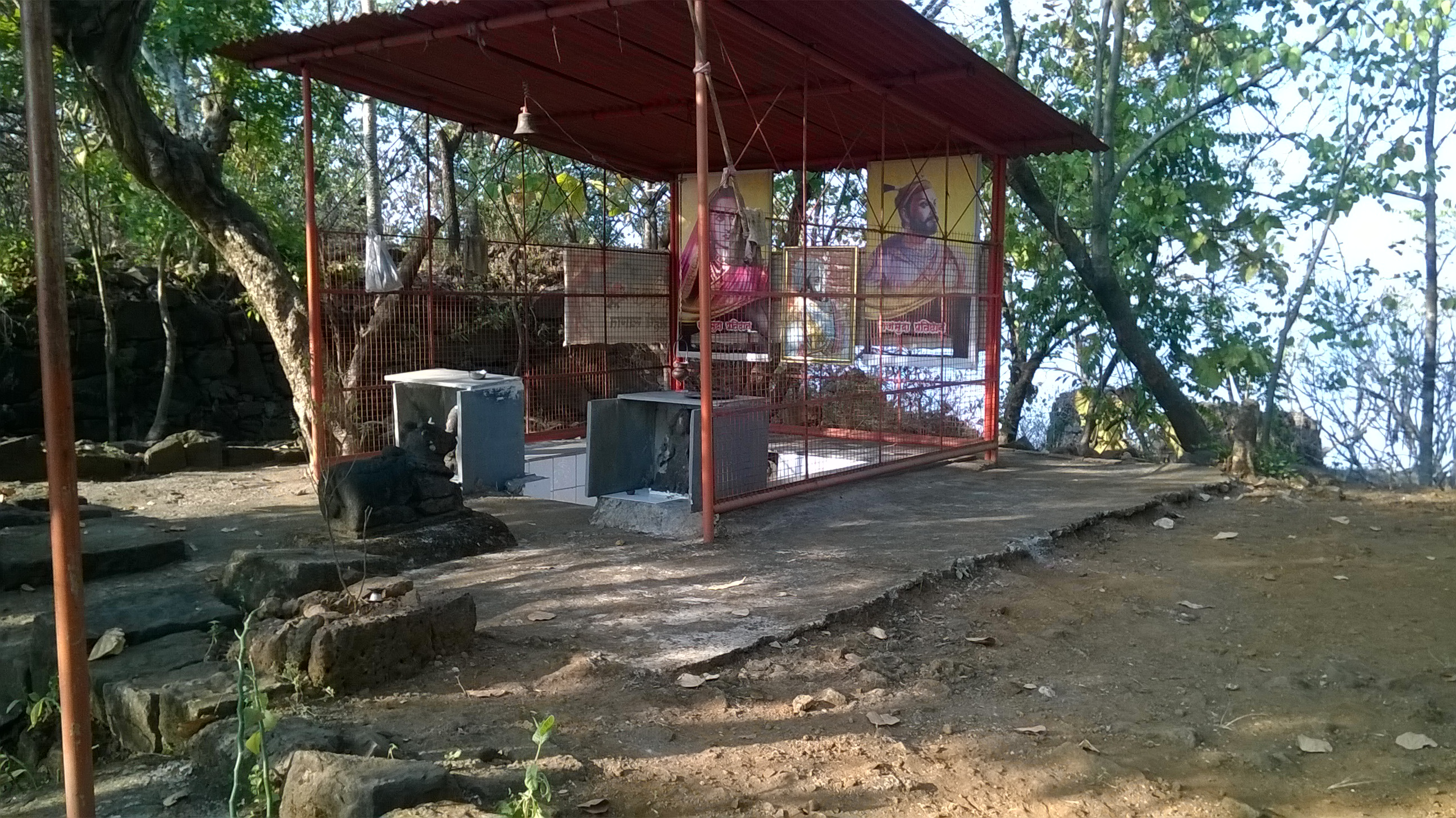
Temple at the fort
