= Pali, Raigad =

- Census town
- Location in Maharashtra, India
- Coordinates: 18.541384°N 73.219965°E
- Country: India
- State: Maharashtra
- District: Raigad
- Elevation: 207 m (679 ft)

Population (2001)
  - Total: 8,167

Languages
  - Official: Marathi
- Time zone: UTC+5:30 (IST)

Pali is a census town in Raigad District in the Indian state of Maharashtra.

== Geography ==
Pali is located at 18.541384°N 73.219965°E. It has an average elevation of 207 metres (679 feet).

== Trekking ==
There are two trekking destinations close to Pali. One is right there in the village. It is a fort called Sarasgad (सरसगड) There is another one from same era called Sudhagad (सुधागड) which is about 10 km away. It has a temple at the top which a place of local pilgrimage. The goddess is called 'Bhorai' (भोराई).Also there is two shrine called ‘Hazrat shah peer’ and ‘Hazrat chand shah’. Another place for trekking is 'Varadayini Mandir' (वरदायिनी) which is about 7 km from Pali.

== Demographics ==
As of 2001 India census, Pali had a population of 8167. Males constitute 51% of the population and females 49%. Pali has an average literacy rate of 78%, higher than the national average of 59.5%: male literacy is 82%, and female literacy is 74%. In Pali, 12% of the population is under 6 years of age.

== Religious value ==
Pali is home to Shri Ballaleshwar, one of the eight 'Ashtavinayakas' in Maharashtra. See Ballaleswar Pali, Raigad or Ashtawinayaka.
