= Sudhagad =

Hill fort in Maharashtra, India

Sudhagad Fort
- Part of Lonavala Hill Range
- Raigad district, Maharashtra
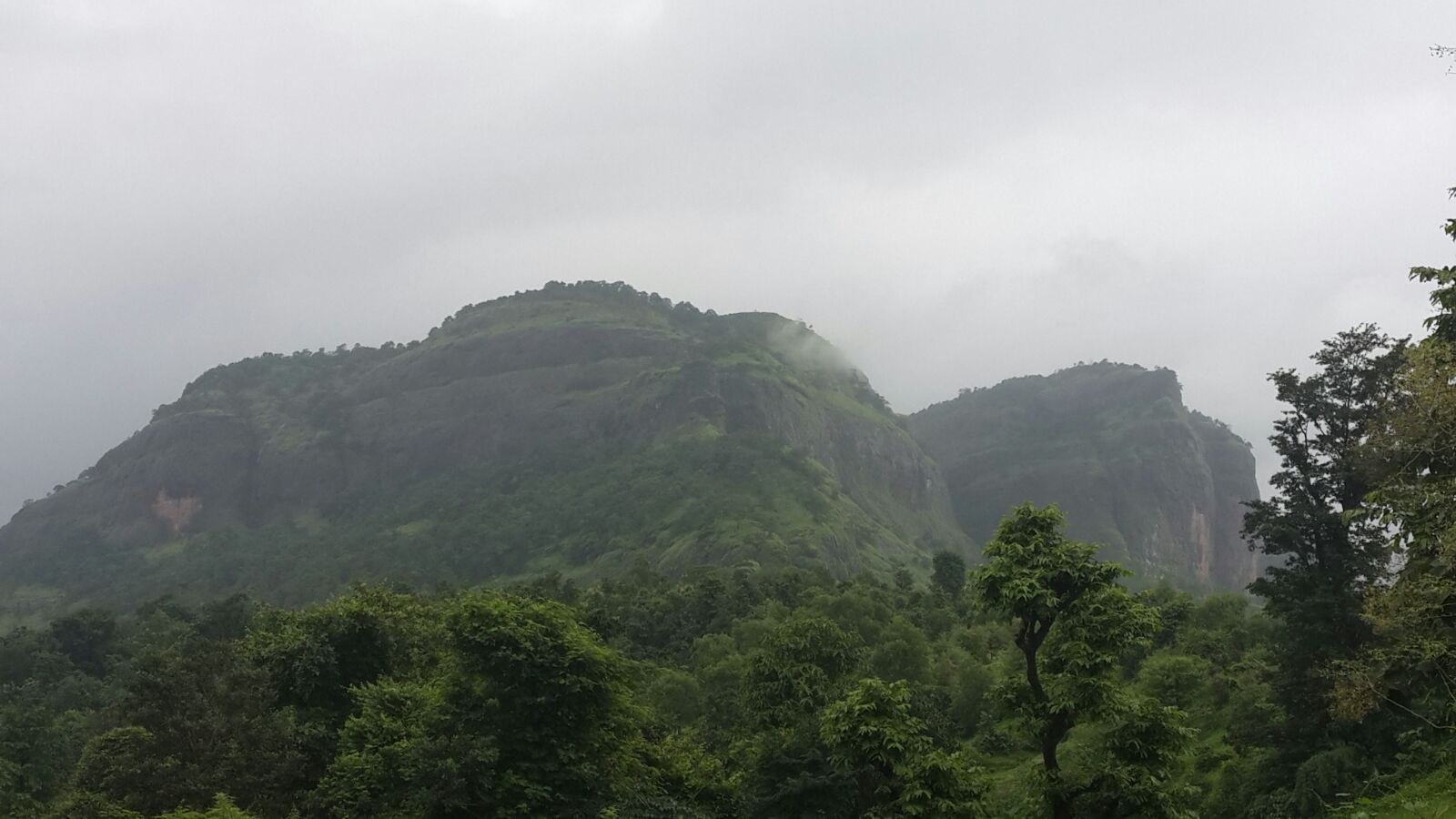
- Sudhagad fort

Site information
- Type: Hill fort
- Owner: Government of India
- Controlled by: Ahmadnagar (1521–1594); Portugal (1594); Maratha Empire (1739–1818); United Kingdom: East India Company (1818–1857); British Raj (1857–1947); India (1947–)
- Open to the public: Yes
- Condition: Ruins

Location
- Shown within Maharashtra
- Coordinates: 18°32′19.8″N 73°19′13.3″E
- Height: 590 m (1935ft)

Site history
- In use: Capital fort
- Materials: Stone

Sudhagad / Bhorapgad is a hill fort situated in Maharashtra, India. It lies about 53 kilometres (33 mi) west of Pune, 26 kilometres (16 mi) south of Lonavala and 11 kilometres (6.8 mi) east of Pali in Raigad District. The summit is 620 metres (2,030 ft) above sea level. The entire area around the fort is declared a Sudhagad wildlife sanctuary.

== History ==
The origin of this fort is said to date back to the 2nd century B.C., the same age as the Thanale Caves and Khadsamble caves nearby. It was then called Bhorapgad (after its presiding deity, Bhoraidevi). In 1436, it was captured by the Bahamani Sultan. In 1657, the Marathas took over and renamed it "Sudhagad"(the sweet one). It was a large fort and Sudhagad was considered by Chhatrapati Shivaji Maharaj as the capital of his kingdom. He surveyed it, but instead chose Raigad because of its central location.

In the regime of the Peshwas, the ‘Pantsachivas’ of Bhor became the custodians of this fort. After the annexation of princely states in 1950 the fort became patron less. As a result, the fort is in a state of ruins, even though it escaped the wrath of the British.

== Major Features ==
The first fort has several ruins of two temples dedicated to Lord Shiva. However, the temple of Bhoraidevi (its patron goddess) is well maintained temple. On the large plateau at the summit, there are two lakes, a house, a big granary, some tombs, a shrine (Vrindavan) and numerous other ruins, scattered around the fort area. There are three main gates the largest of which is called the Maha Darwaja. From the top, other forts like Sarasgad, Korigad, Ghangad, Taila-Baila are clearly visible.

== Current use ==
Sudhagad is a popular trekking destination as it is one of the better preserved forts in Maharashtra. It takes about 1–2 hours to reach the top of the fort. The trekking route from village Thakurwadi is most popular and regularly used. There are no water cisterns on the way. The night halt at the fort in any season can be made at Pantsachiv wada and Bhorai mata Mandir. There are two water ponds on the fort. On the slopes of the fort there are trees of pandhri which are used to make a popular walking stick.

== Gallery ==
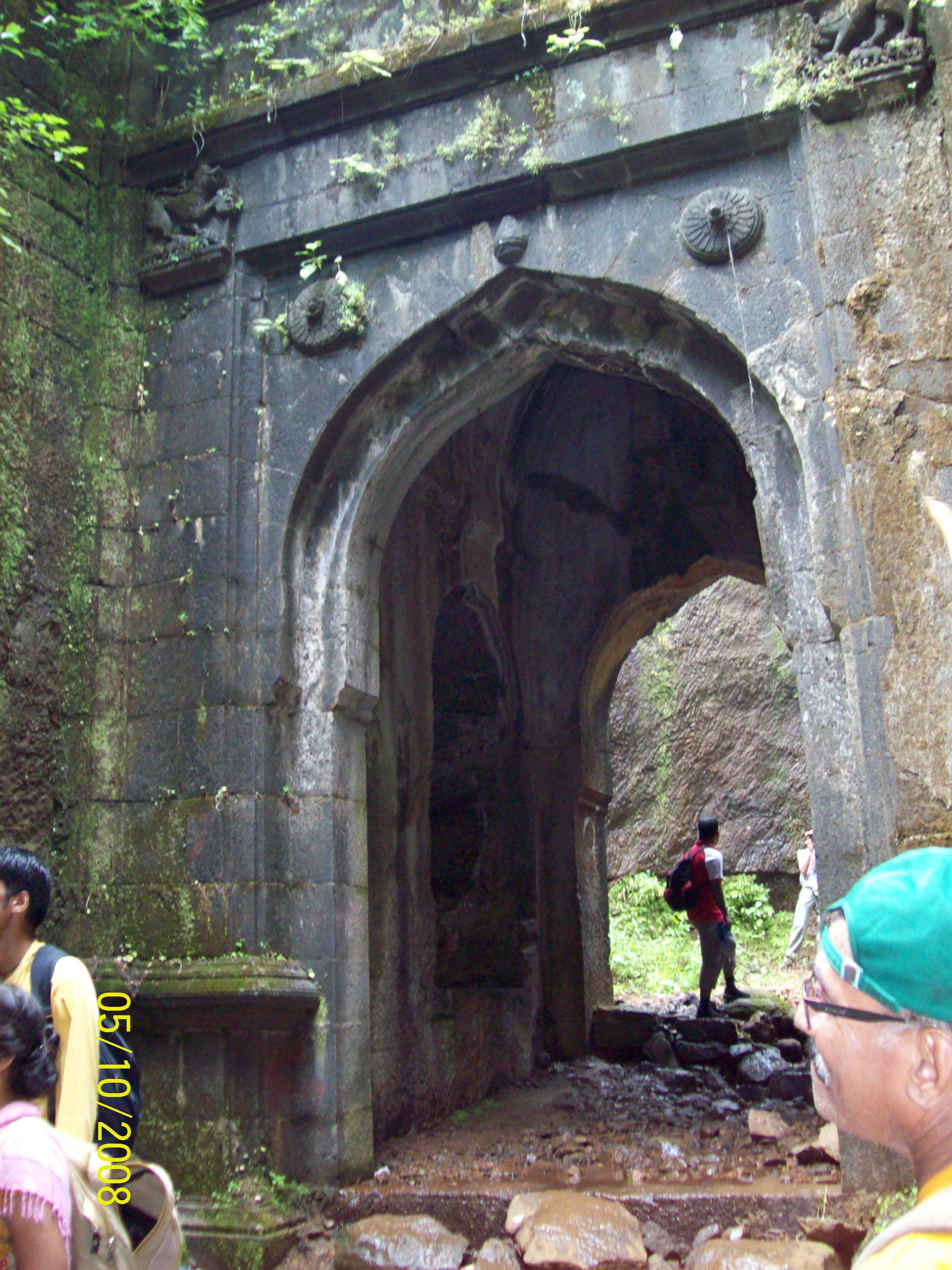
Entrance of Sudhagad

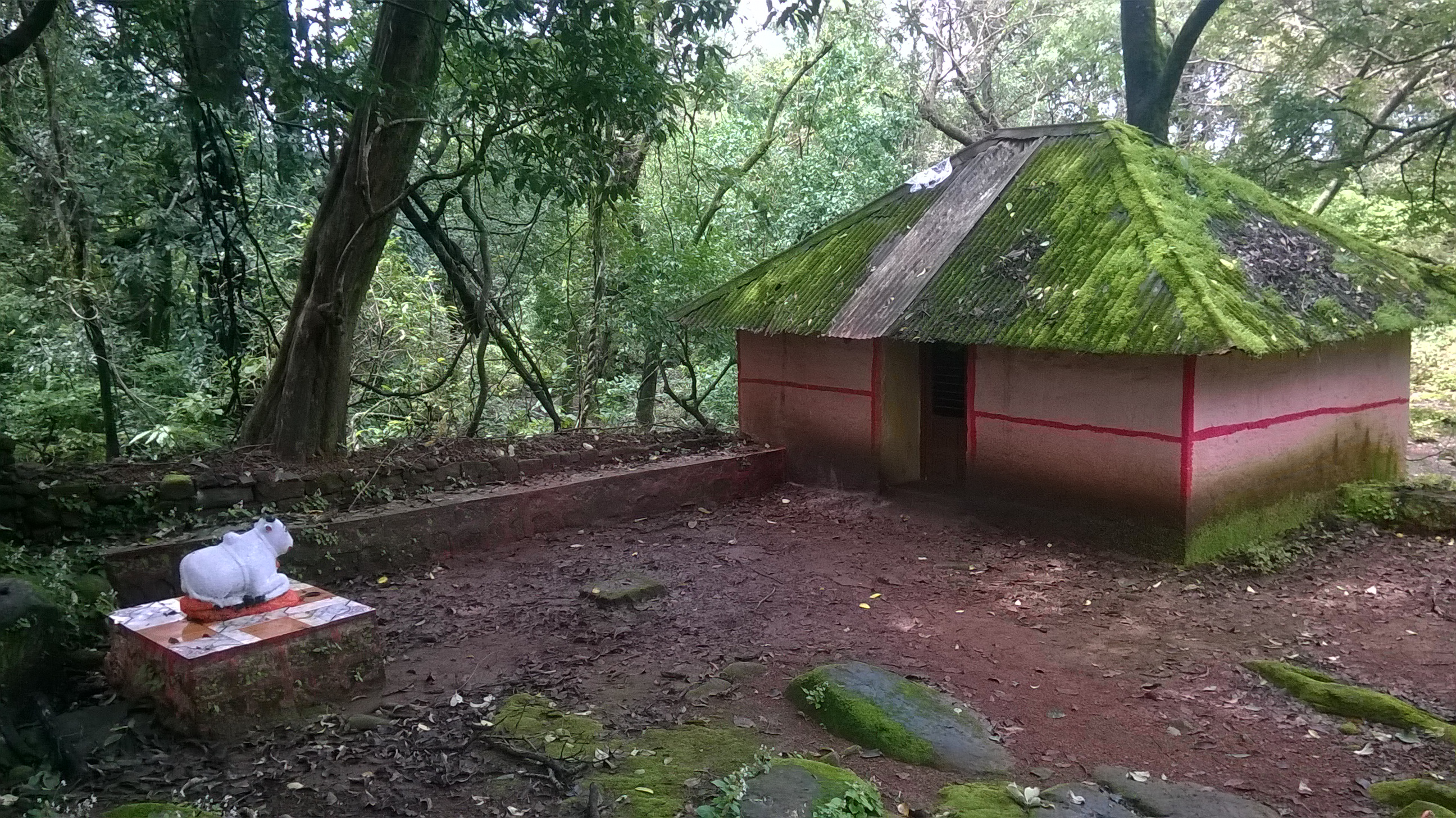
Shiva Temple on the fort

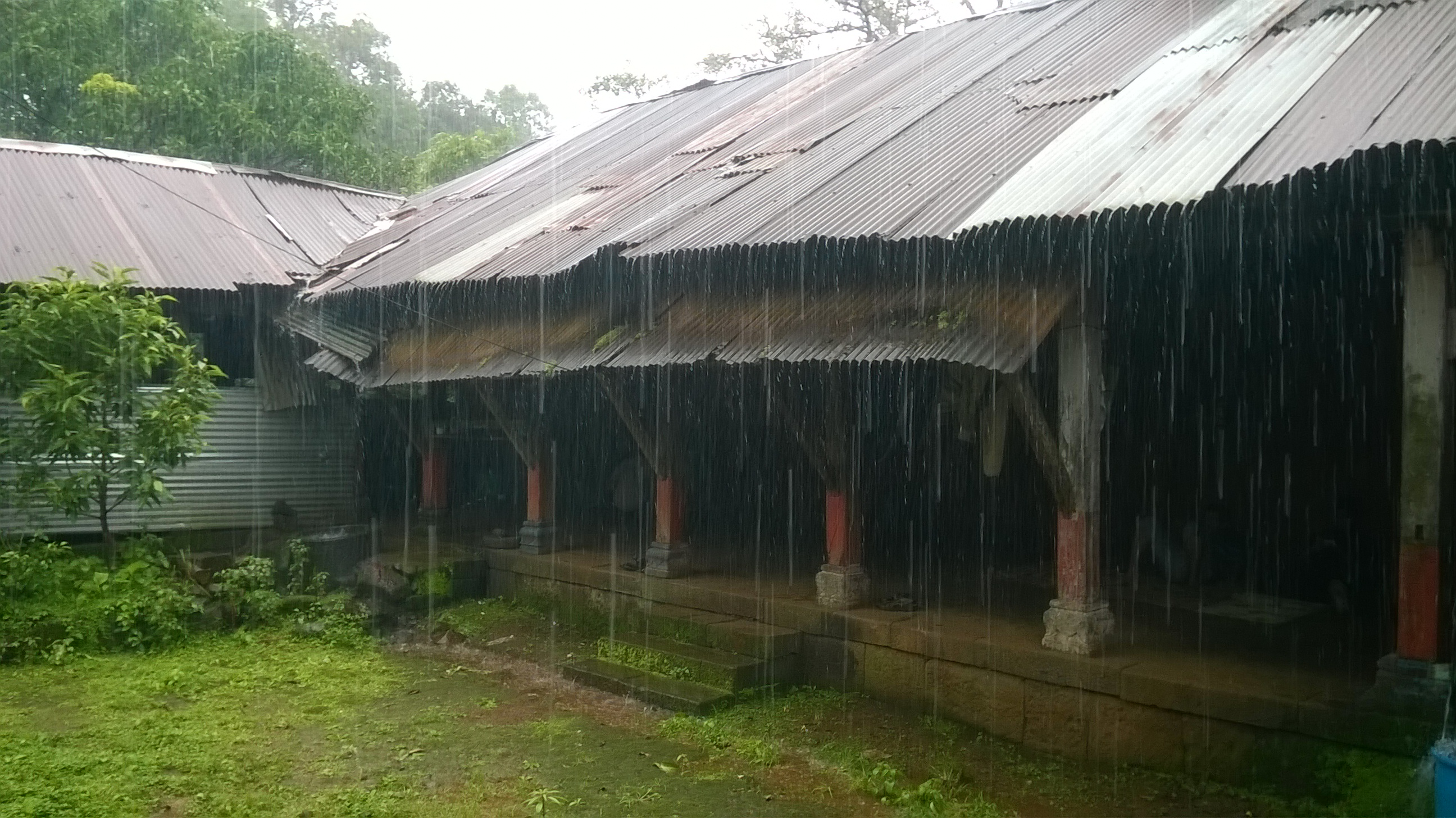
PantsachivWada in Rains

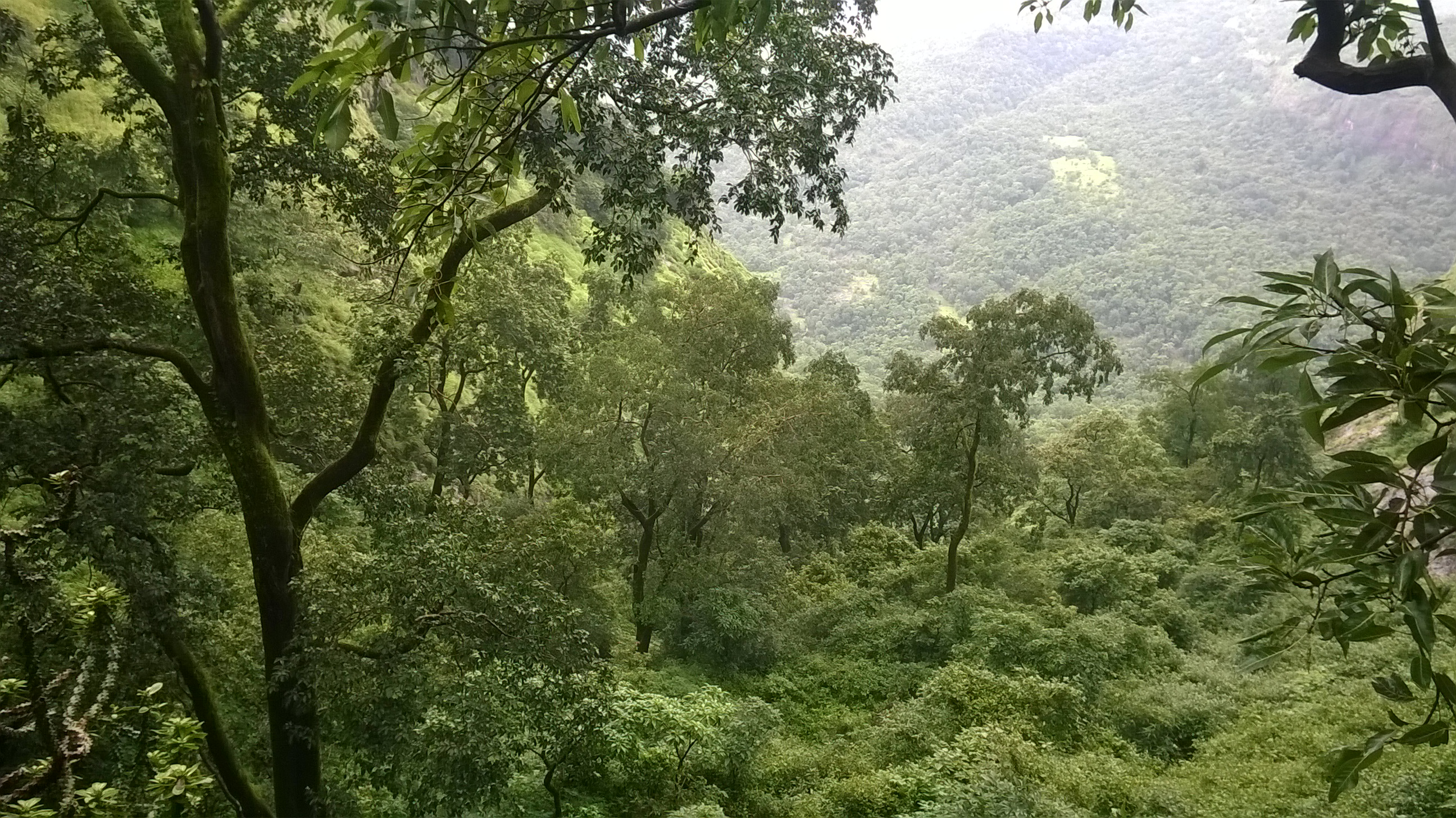
forest around the fort

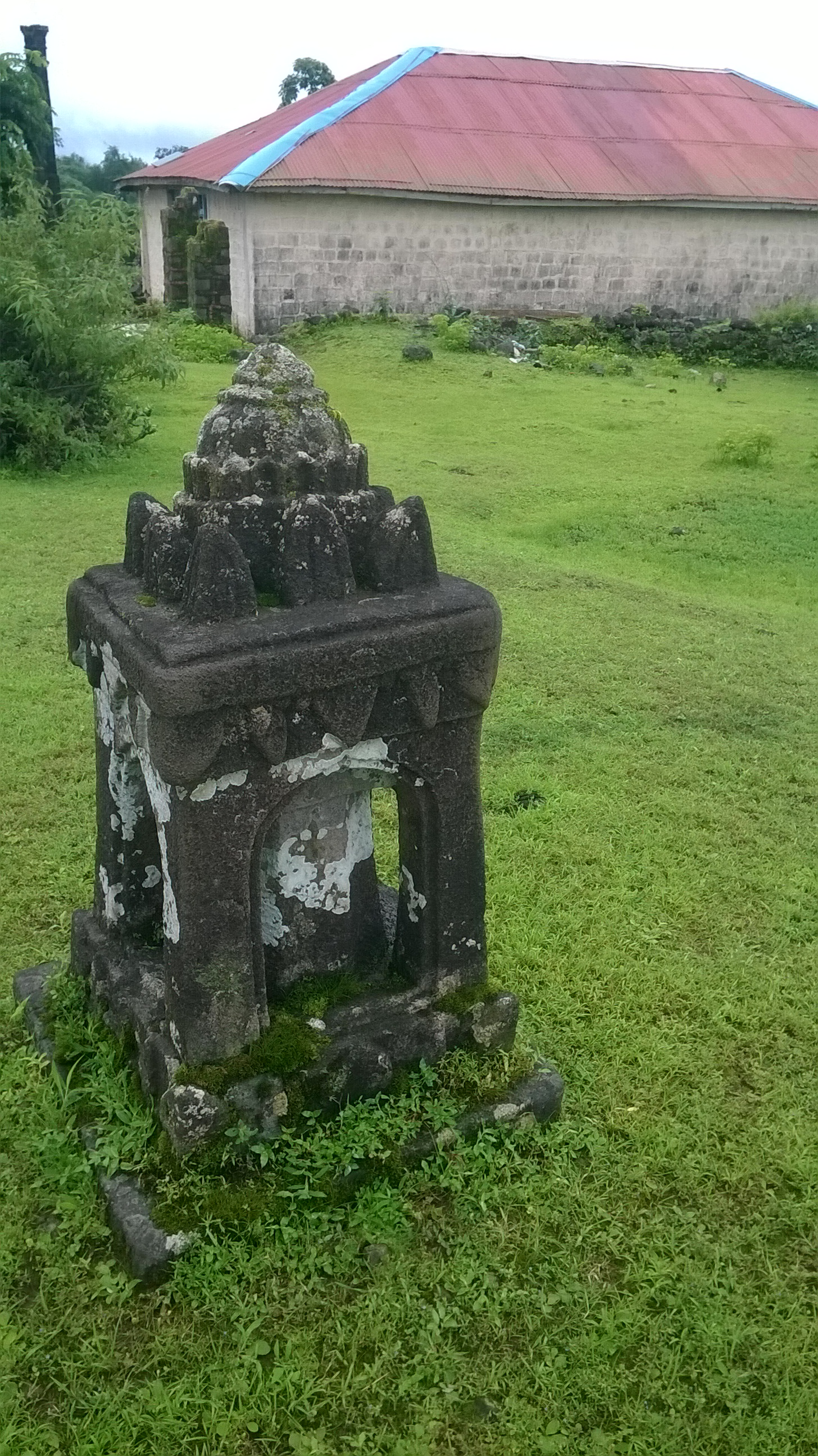
Bhoraidevi temple

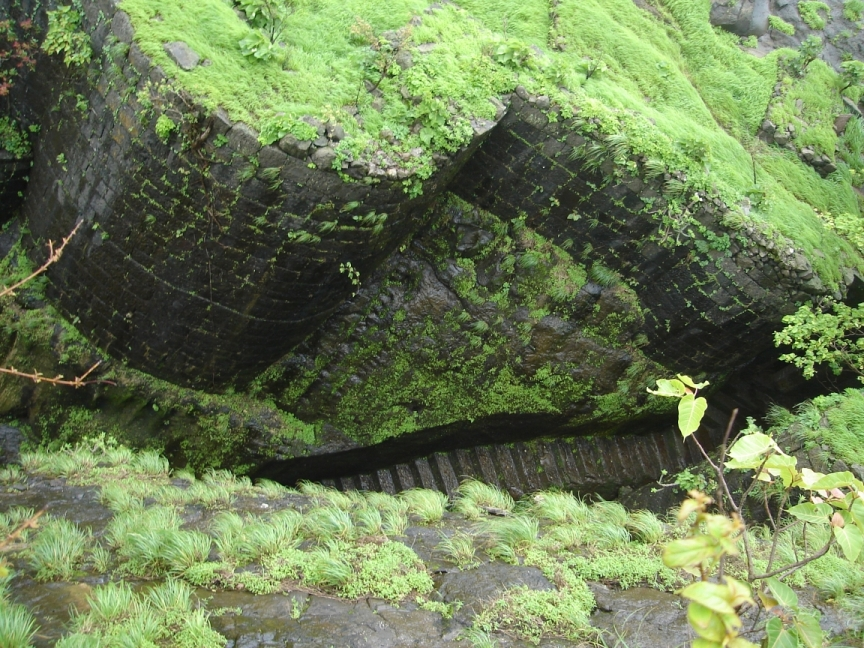
Entrance of Sudhagad as seen from the higher ramparts of the fort

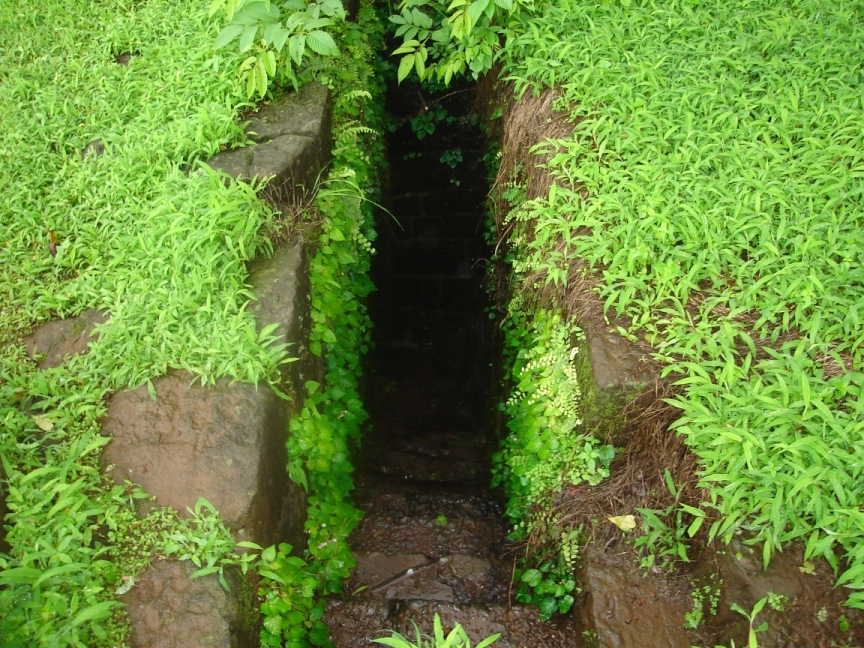
Secret escape route, Sudhagad fort

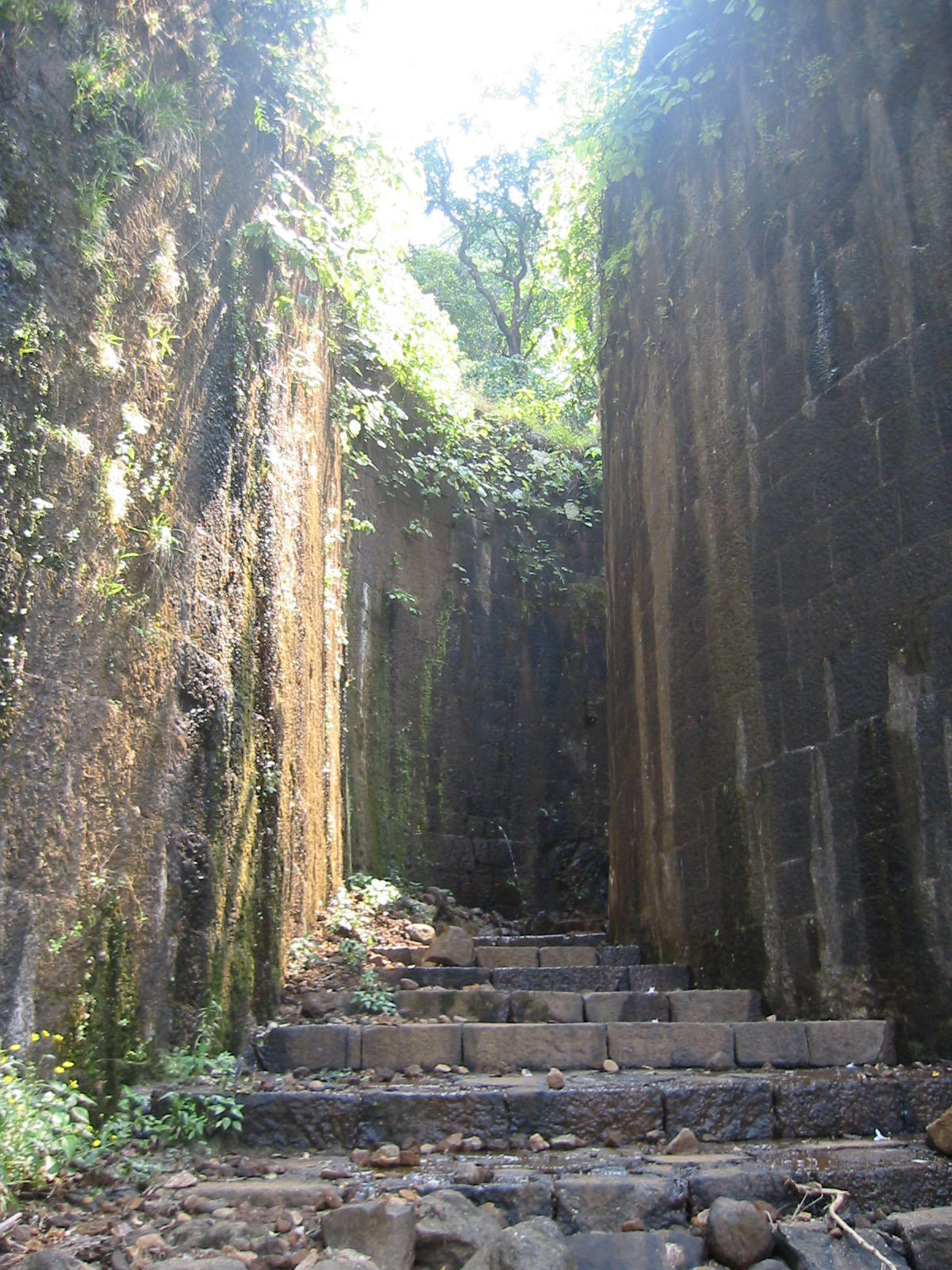
Sudhagad main entrance

== See also ==
- List of forts in Maharashtra
- List of forts in India
- Battles involving the Maratha Empire
- Maratha Army
- Maratha titles
- Military history of India
