= Sarasgad =

Village in Maharashtra

Sarasgad Fort
- Raigad District, Maharashtra

Site information
- Type: Hill fort
- Owner: Government of Maharashtra
- Controlled by: Archeological Survey of India
- Open to the public: Yes
- Condition: Ruines

Location
- Shown within Maharashtra
- Location within Maharashtra
- Coordinates: 18.542614°N 73.227965°E
- Height: 487.68m (1600ft)

Site history
- Materials: Stones

Garrison information
- Occupants: Ahmednagar Sultanate; Maratha Empire; British Raj; India

Sarasgad fort is situated near village Pali in the Raigad district of Maharashtra. Pali lies about 10 kilometres East of Nagothane along the Nagothane-Khopoli road. This fort height from sea level is 490 meters

== How to reach ==
Sarasgad Fort is the twin of Sudhagad Fort. It can be identified by its four pinnacles and thus was mainly used as a watch place to check the surrounding region. The construction of the fort is now not in a good condition but the huge rock steps are something to be seen. On the way from the south, there are 111 steps carved in stone. The door from this side is known as 'Dindi darvaja '. There are two routes that lead to the top of this fort from Pali.

== Places to see ==
On the top is the Shiva temple providing an excellent panoramic view of all the mountain ranges surrounding this area. Sudhagad, Sankshi fort, Sagargad and TailBaila can be easily viewed from the top of Sarasgad. There are many caves that were used for soldiers and other purposes because the fort has the very little area available on its top. There are around ten tanks carved in rocks. They provide cool water supply throughout the year, which is very important for any fort.

== History ==
It was one of the forts which was captured by Malik Ahmad Nizam Shah I of Ahmednagar in his konkan campaigns in 1485. Shivaji Maharaj gave 2000 hones (golden coin used as currency during Shivaji Maharaj's time) for repairing the fortifications of this fort. After the victory over Vasai, Chimaji Appa donated a Portuguese bell to the Ballaleshwar temple which he had brought from Vasai in 1739. Till independence, this fort was in Bhor princely state.

== Nearby ==
Among the Ashtavinayakas, Ballaleshwar at Pali is the only Ganesha who is famous by the name of his devotee and who is dressed up as a Brahmin. This place is nestled between the fort Sarasgad and Amba River.

== Gallery ==
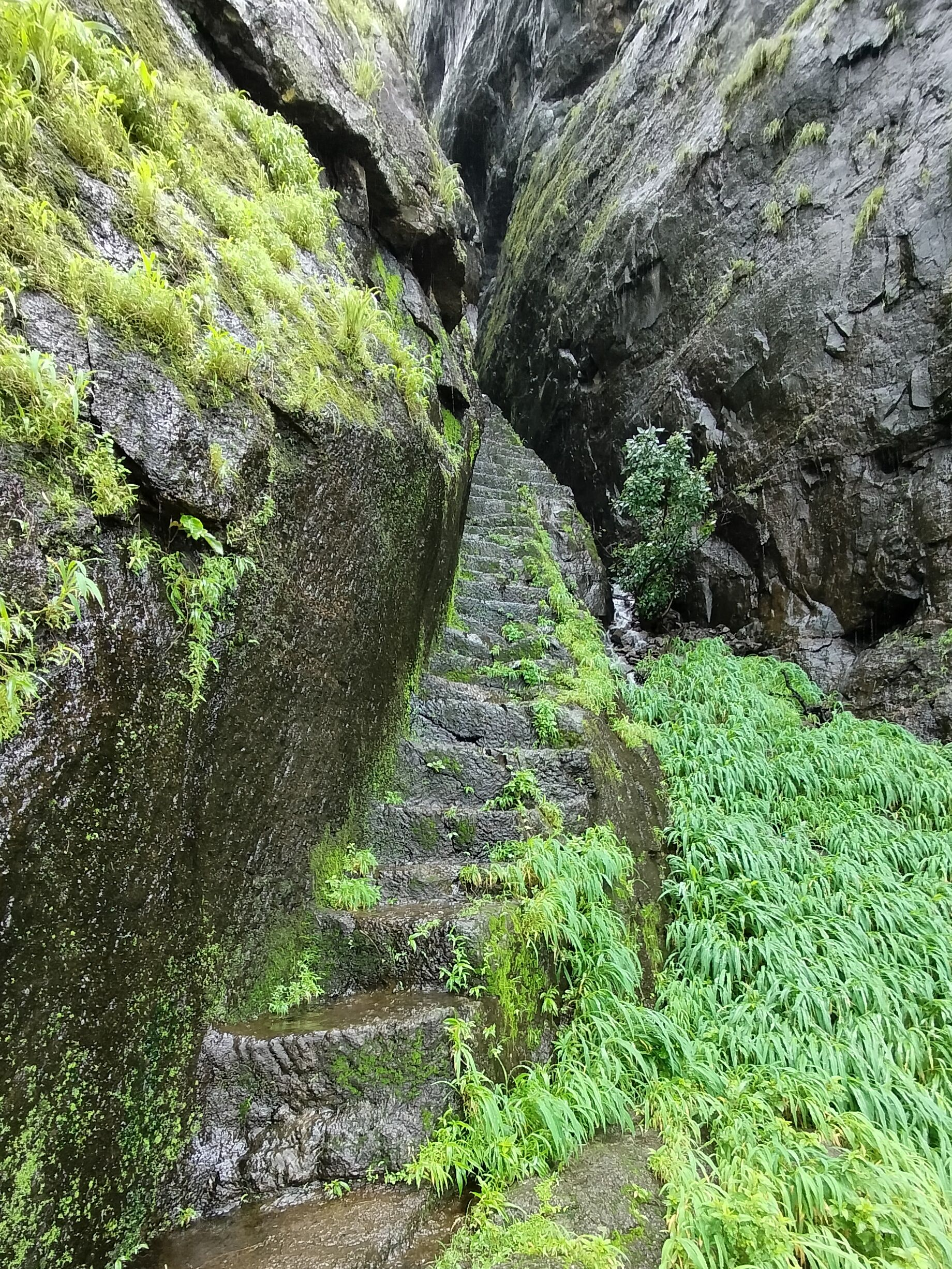
Stairs leading to the entrance of the fort

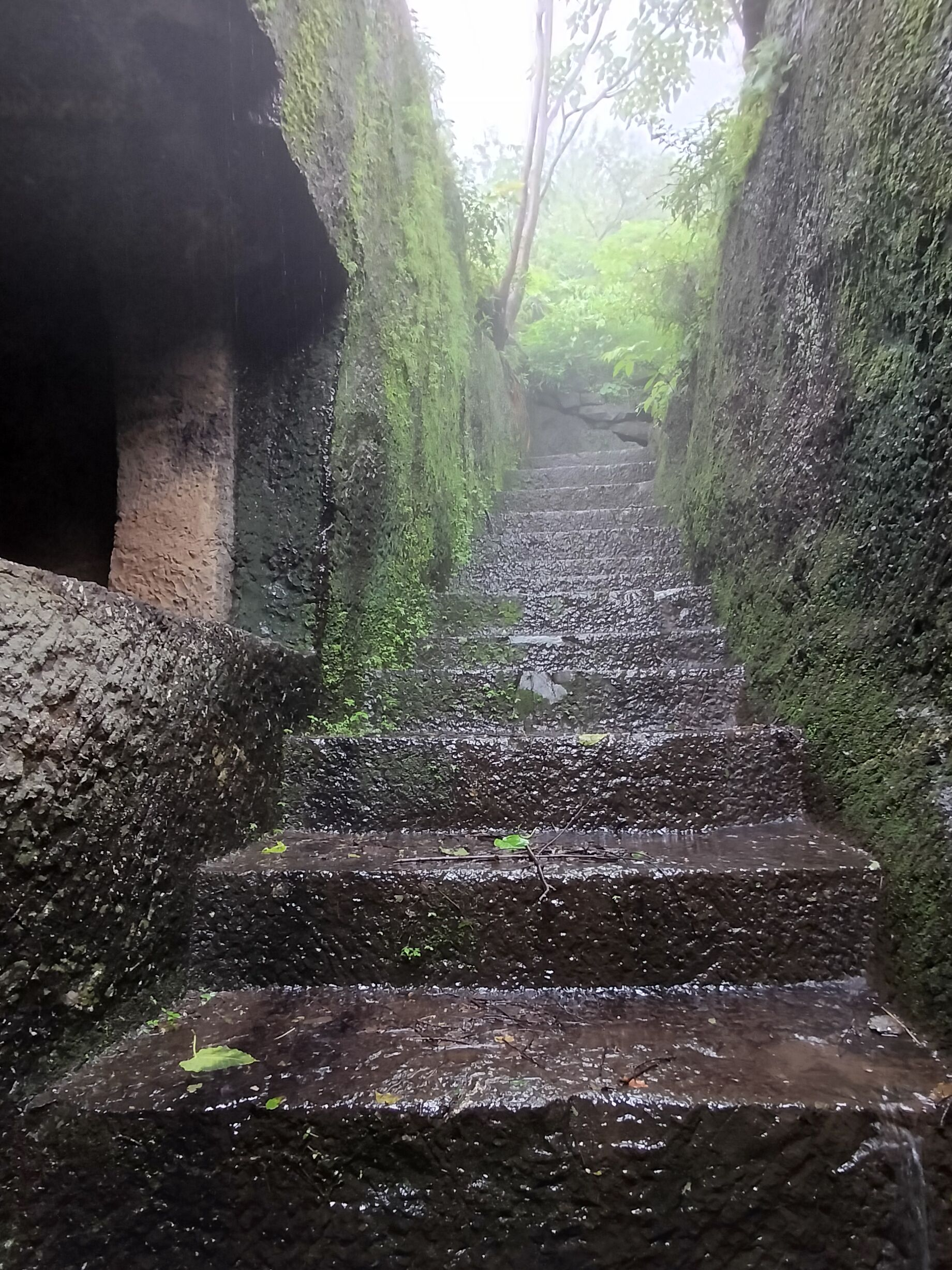
Stairs inside the fort

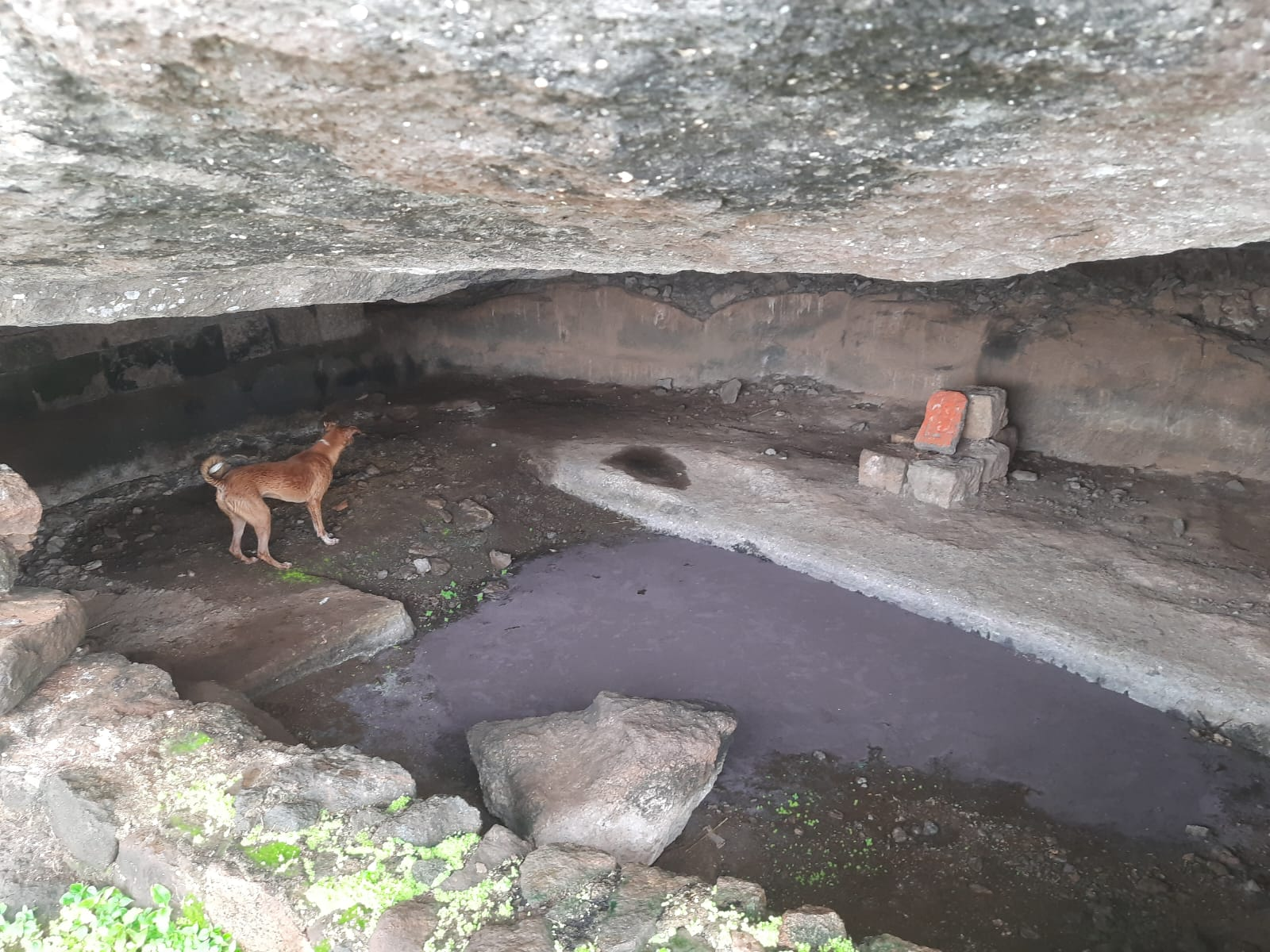
Rock-cut cave

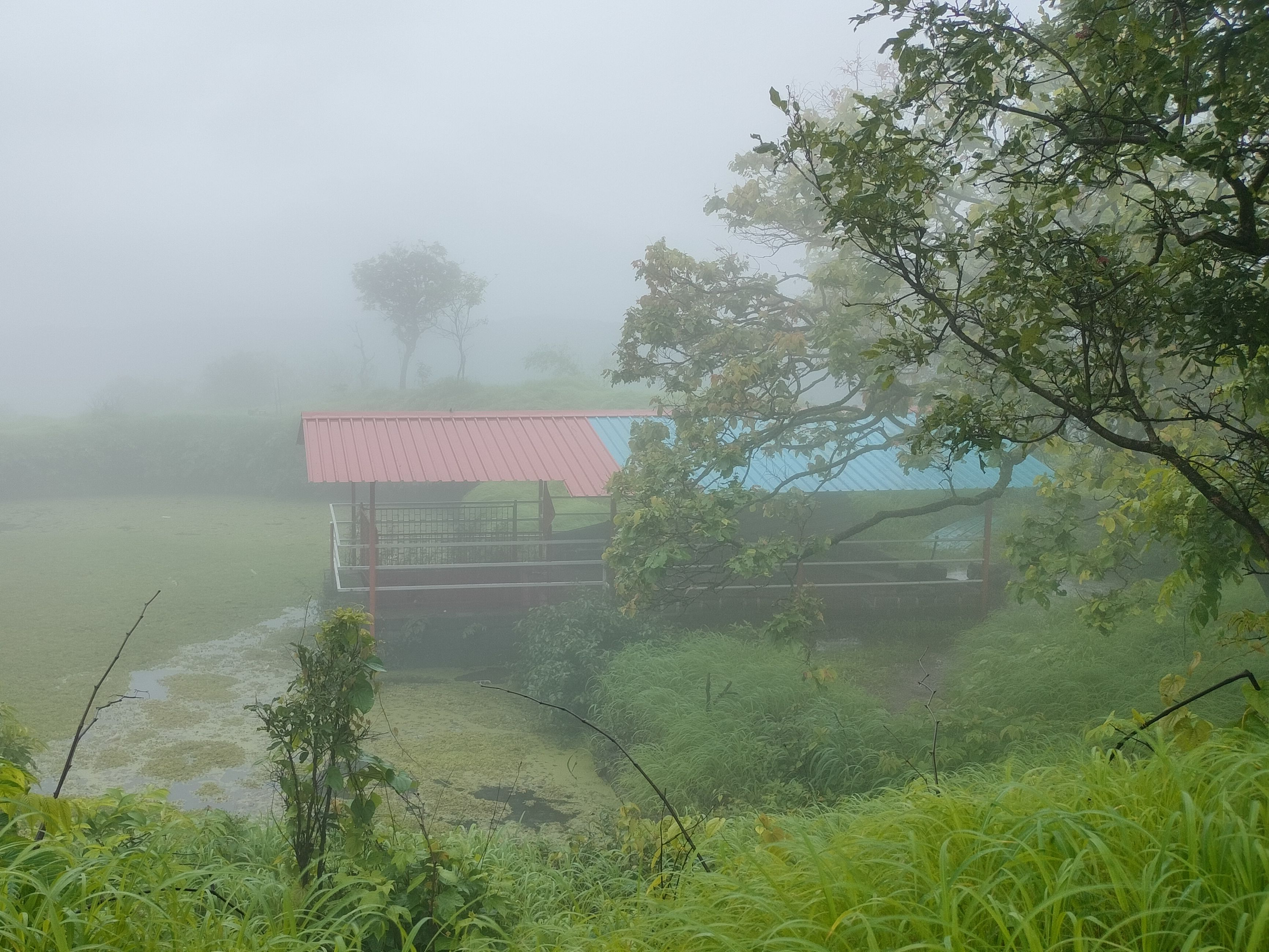
Shiva Temple on top

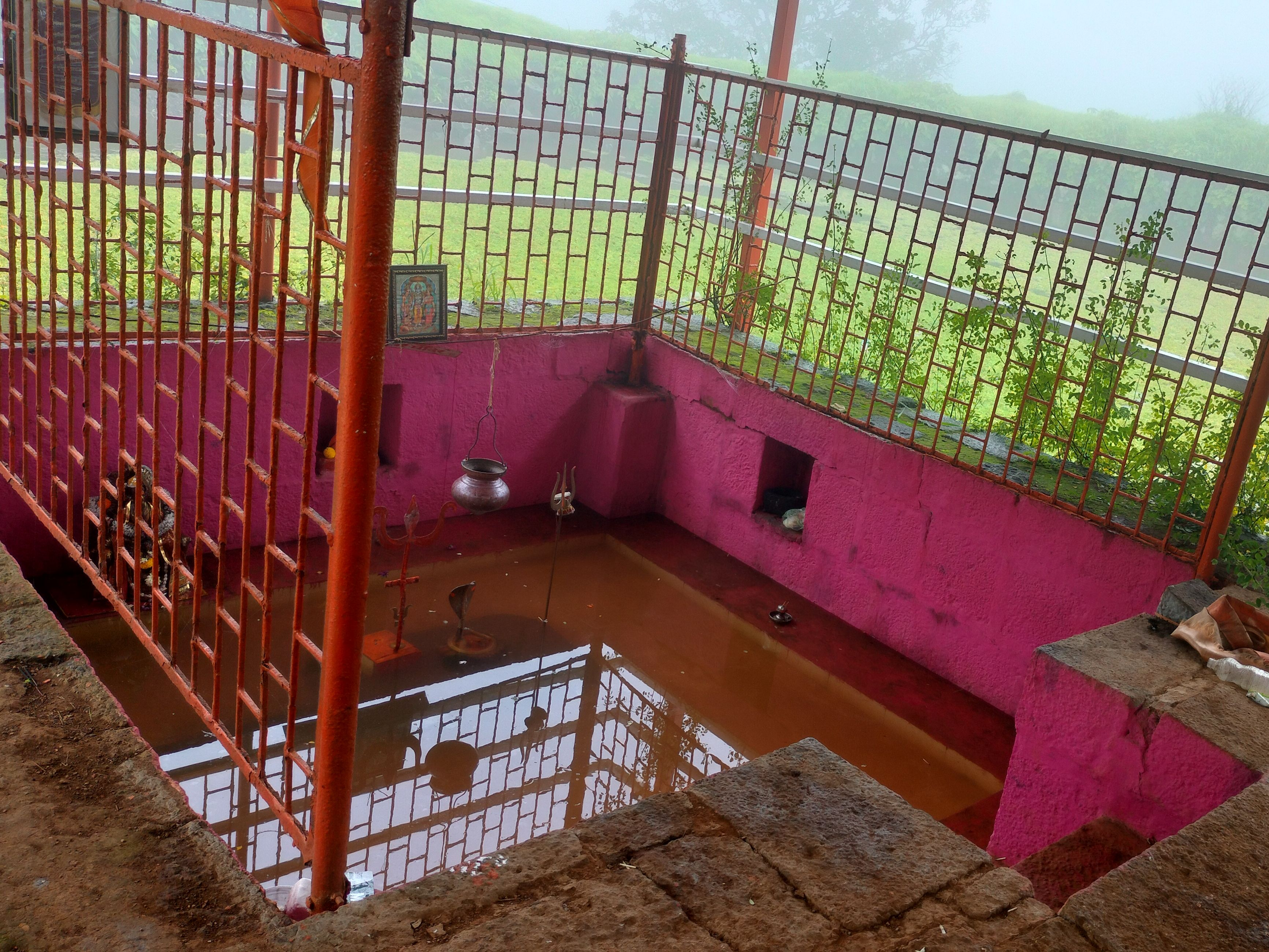
Inside the temple

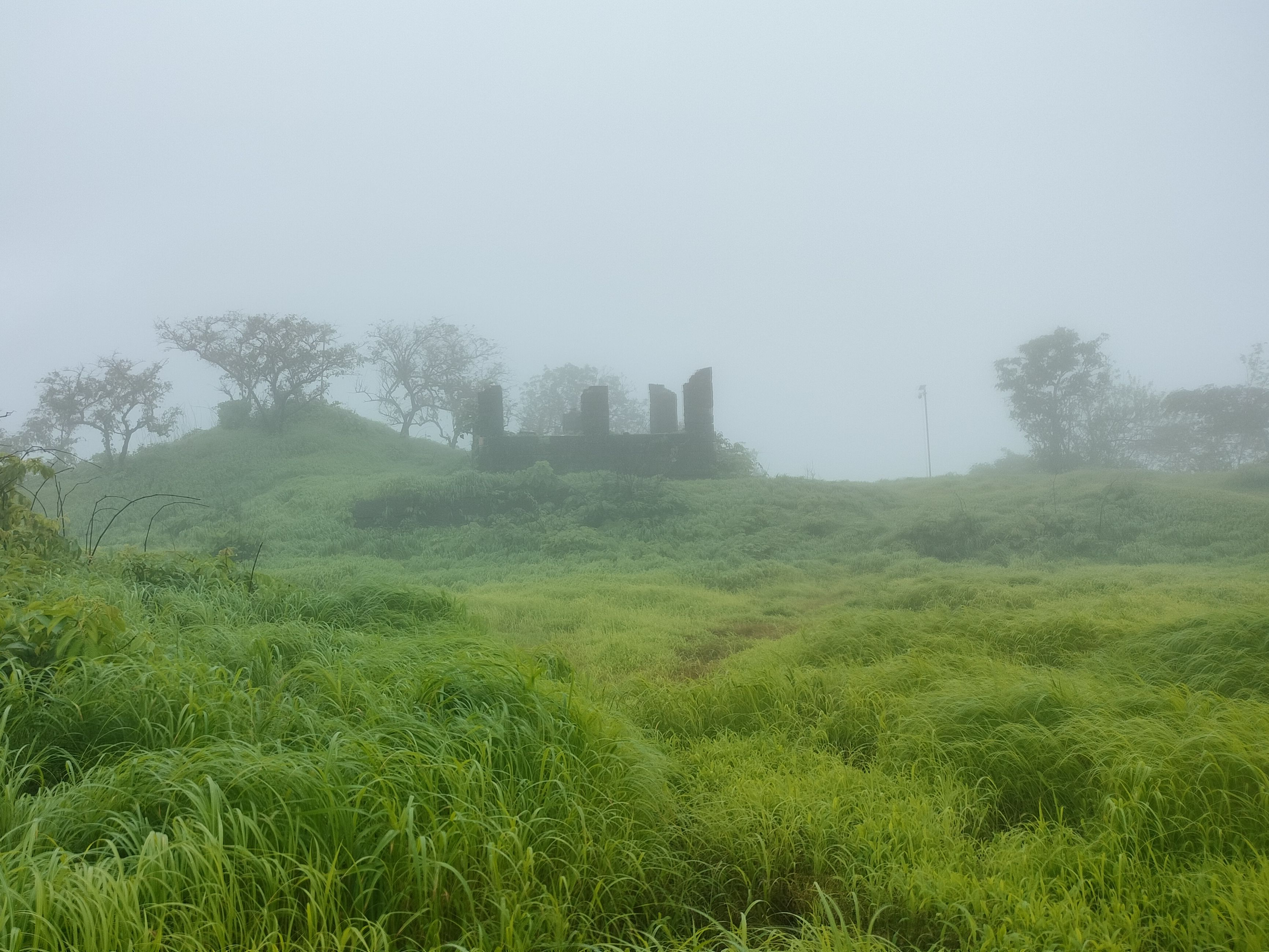
Ruins of the fort

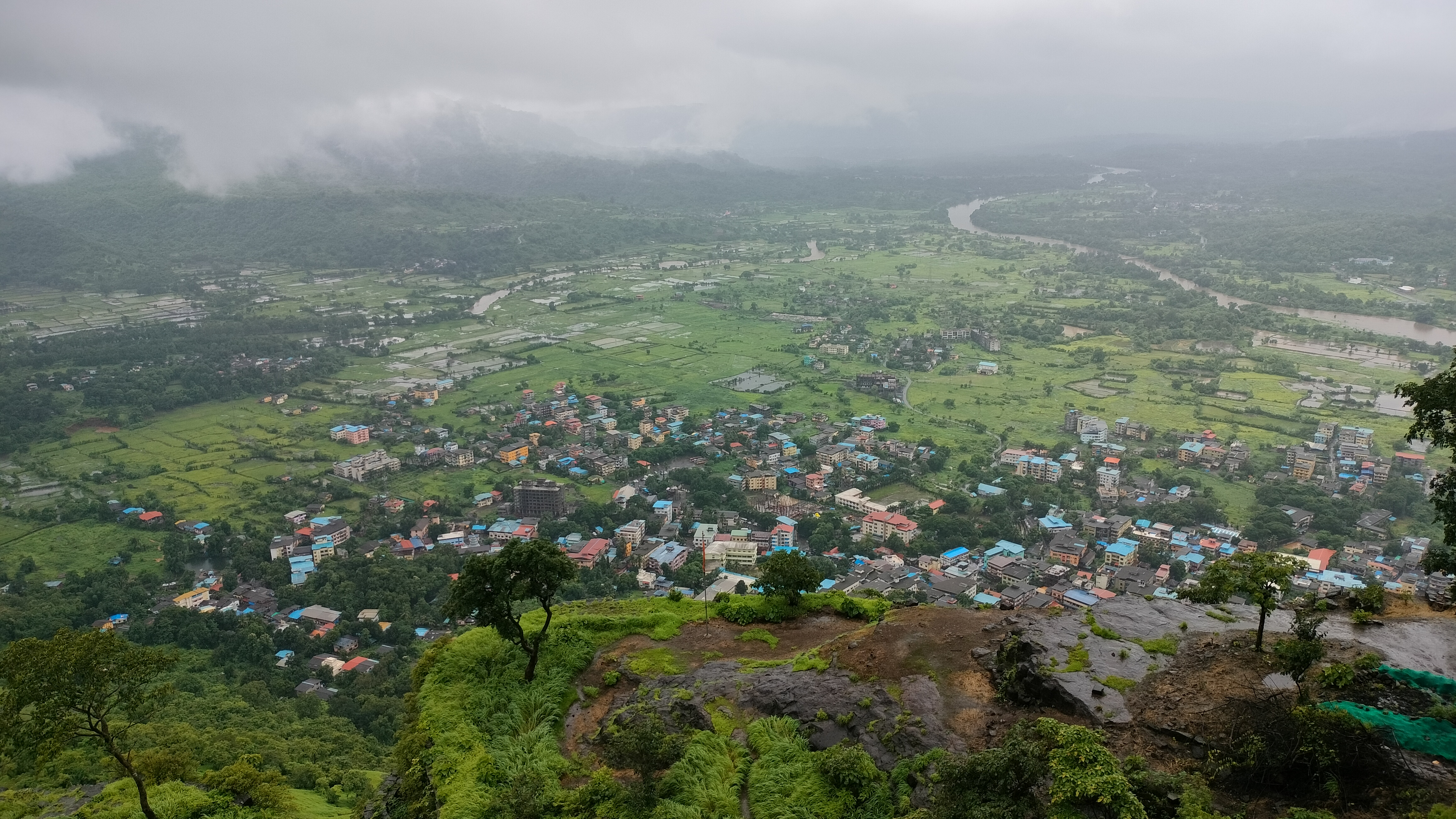
View of Pali village from the fort

== See also ==
- List of forts in Maharashtra
- List of forts in India
- Marathi People
- List of Maratha dynasties and states
- Maratha War of Independence
- Battles involving the Maratha Empire
- Maratha Army
- Maratha titles
- Military history of India
