= Ballaleshwar Pali =

Temple in Raigad district, in India

Coordinates: 18°32′8.26″N 73°13′26.64″E

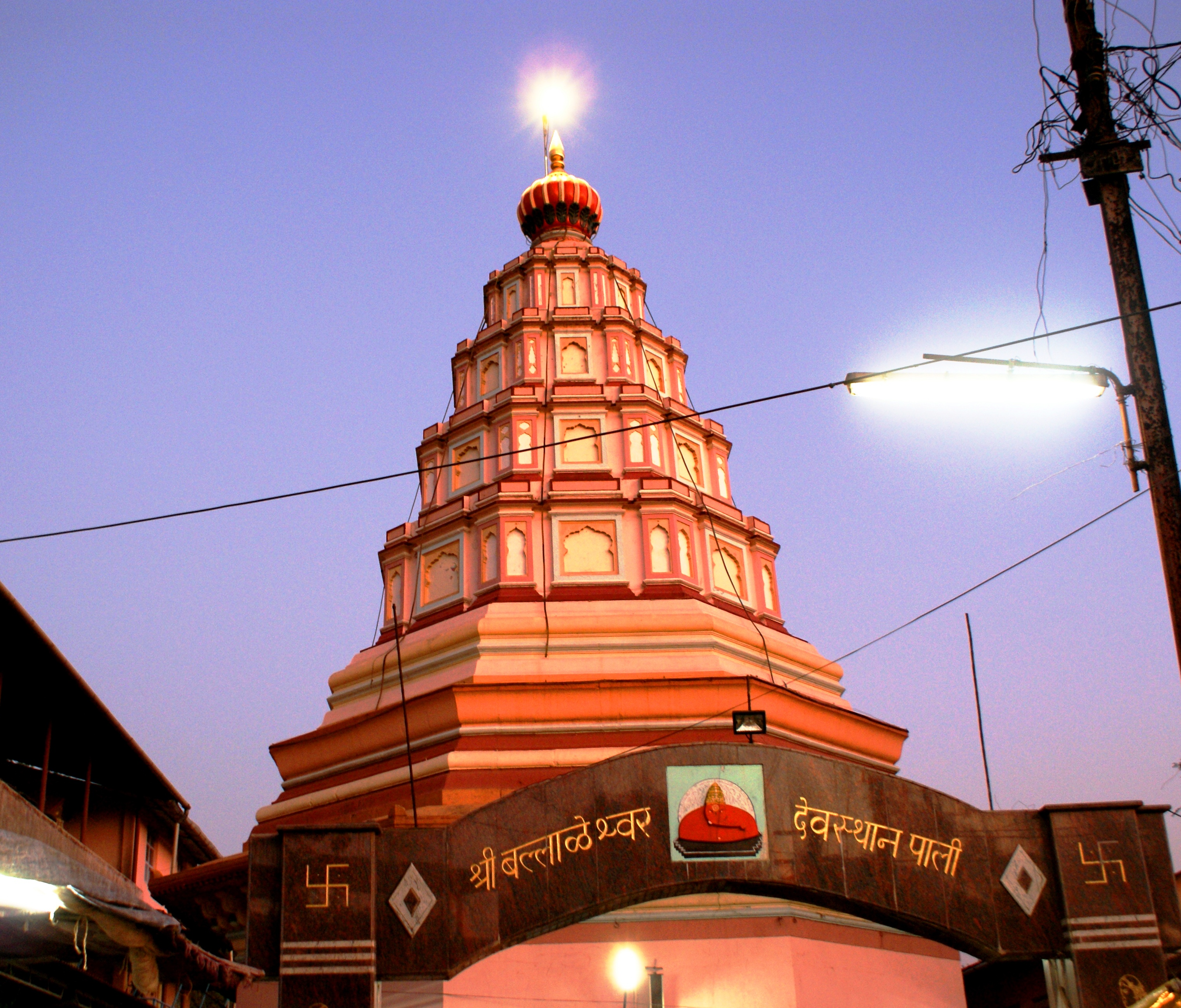

Religion
- Affiliation: Hinduism
- District: Raigad district
- Deity: Lord Ganesha

Location
- Location: village of Pali
- State: Maharashtra
- Country: India

Ballaleshwar Pali is one of the eight temples of the Hindu God Ganesha. Among Ganesha temples, Ballaleshwar is the only one dedicated to Ganesha that is known by his devotee's name. It is located in the village of Pali which is 28 km from Roha in the Raigad district of Maharashtra, India. It is situated between fort Sarasgad and the river Amba.

== The temple ==
Moreshvar Vitthal Sindkar constructed the temple in 1640. He was one of the major contributor of the work of Chatrapati Shivaji. The Ganesha devotee and had immense contribution to the development of the temple. The original wooden temple was renovated in 1760 to make way for a new stone temple designed by Shri Fadnis. Built in the shape of the letter Shri, it was made by mixing lead with the cement during construction. The east-facing temple was carefully positioned so that, as the sun rises, sun rays fall directly on the murti during worship. The temple contains a bell that was brought back by Chimaji Appa after defeating Portuguese.

The temple complex encircles two lakes and is tiled throughout. There are two sanctums in the temple, an inner and an outer sanctum. The inner sanctum is 15 feet (4.6 m) high, while the outer sanctum is only 12 feet (3.7 m) high. The outer sanctum contains a murti in the shape of a rat, holding modak in its hands while facing Ganesha. The main hall of the temple is 40 feet (12 m) long and 20 feet (6.1 m) wide and contains eight pillars resembling cypress trees.

=== The murti ===
The murti of Vinayaka sits on a stone throne, facing east with its trunk turned left and sitting against a background of silver which displays Riddhi and Siddhi waving chamaras. The murti's eyes and navel contain diamonds.

== Legend ==
In the village of Pali lived a successful businessman named Kalyan with his wife, Indumati. Their son, Ballal, and the other children in the village used to play puja, using stones in place of murtis. Once, the children, going to the outskirts of the village, saw a very large stone. At the insistence of Ballal, the children worshipped the stone as Ganesha. Led by Ballal, the children became so engrossed in their worship that they forgot about hunger and thirst; day and night.

Meanwhile, the parents of the village anxiously waited for their children to come home. When the children did not return on time, they all went to Kalyan's house and complained about his son Ballal. Kalyan, flying into a rage, took a stick and went in search of the children. Eventually, he found the children listening to the Ganesha Purana. In his fury, he destroyed the small temples built by the children, who fled away in terror, leaving Ballal by himself. Ballal, completely submerged in devotion to Ganesha, was grabbed by his father and beaten until blood drenched his clothes. His father proceeded to tie him to a tree and trampled on all the puja materials collected by the children. Lifting the large stone which the children had treated as Ganesha, he threw it to the ground, breaking it into pieces. He taunted Ballal, "Now we shall see which God protects you!" Going home, he left his own son bound to the tree to die.

Still bound to the tree, Ballal cursed his father for having insulted Ganesha, "May he become blind, deaf, dumb, and hunchbacked for his disrespect to the son of Parvati!" Though filled with pain, hunger, and thirst, he continued chanting the name of Ganesha until, exhausted, he fainted. On waking, Ballal entreated Ganesha to come to his aid. Lord Ganesha, moved by the child's devotion, appeared in the form of a sadhu before Ballal and untied him from the tree. On seeing Ganesha, Ballal's thirst and hunger vanished; his wounds were healed and he was completely invigorated. He prostrated before the sadhu, recognizing him as Ganesha, and worshipped him. Ganesha told Ballal he would bless him with whatever he asked for as a reward for his devotion. Ballal entreated, "May I be your unshakeable devotee, and may you always stay in this place and remove the miseries of the people who seek refuge in you." Ganesha said, "I shall ever remain here, and will take your name before mine, being worshiped as Ballal's Lord (BallalEshwar)." He embraced Ballal and vanished into the nearby stone. The stone's cracks disappeared and was made whole again.

That stone statue is called Ballaleshwar. The stone idol which Kalyan threw to the ground is also known as Dhundi Vinayak. This is a swayambhu murti and is worshipped before Ballaleshwar is worshipped.

== See also ==
- Ashtavinayaka
