= Ghangad =

Fort in Maharashtra state, India

Ghanagad Fort
- Part of Sahyadri Hill Range
- Pune district, Maharashtra
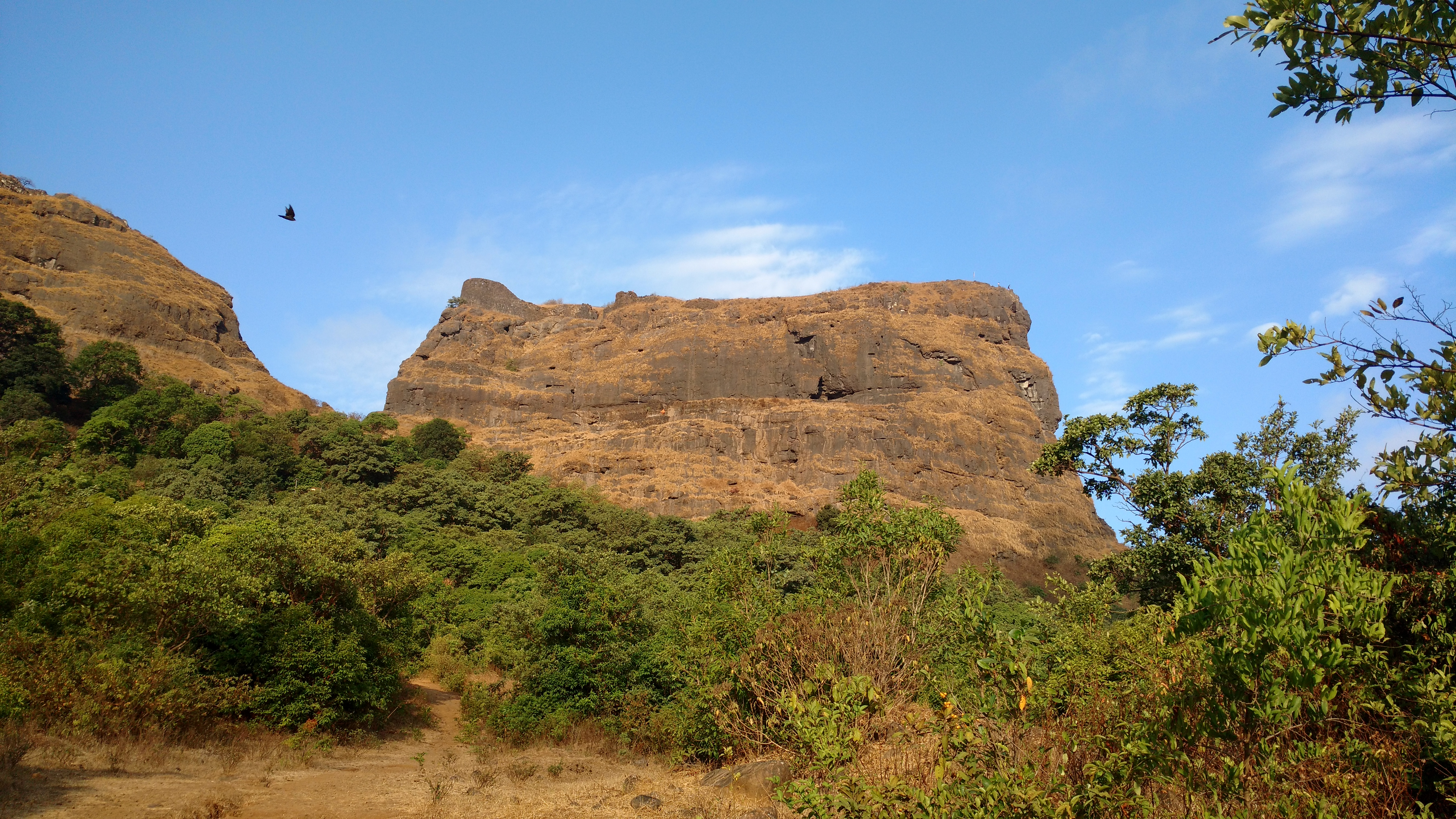
- Ghanagad fort

Site information
- Type: Hill fort
- Owner: Government of India
- Open to the public: Yes
- Condition: Ruins

Location
- Shown within Maharashtra
- Coordinates: 18°32′44.7″N 73°21′34.5″E
- Height: 3000 Ft.

Site history
- Materials: Stone

Ghangad is a fort situated near 30km from Lonavala-Khandala and 100 km from Pune in Maharashtra state, India. It is an important fort in the Pune district. The fort restoration is done by the Shivaji Trail group with the help of local villagers. Restoration work took place in 2011-12. The fort is at least 300 years old.

== History ==
Very little information is available about the history of the fort. It was used for keeping prisoners and for keeping watch on the trade route from Pune to Konkan. Until 1818 the fort was under the Maratha empire. It was surrendered to British forces after the fall of Korigad on 17 March 1818.

== How to reach ==
The fort can be reached by road via Tamhini ghat road or via Lonavala. The nearest town is Lonavala which is 30km from the base village of the fort i.e. Ekole. There are good hotels at Lonavla, now tea and snacks are also available in small hotels on the way at Peth Shahapur. The road becomes rugged in the Saltar pass. The trekking path starts from the hillock south of the Ekole village. The route is very safe and wide. There is a dense forest on the trekking route. It takes about half an hour to reach the entrance gate of the fort. The night stay on the fort can be made on the flat ground near the entrance or GarjaiDevi temple on the way to Fort. This fort is approachable in all seasons. The villagers from the Ekole make night stay and food arrangements at reasonable rates.

== Places to see ==
There are two gates on the fort. The main entrance gate has the arch missing. The villagers have placed an iron ladder to climb to the Balekilla of the fort. There is a rock cut water cistern on the way to the second gate. The water is available round the year for drinking purpose. It takes about an hour to visit all places on the fort. There are remains of a few dilapidated buildings on the Balekilla. The top of the balekilla gives a scenic view of the TailBaila, Korigad, Mulshi dam and Sudhagad fort.

== Gallery ==
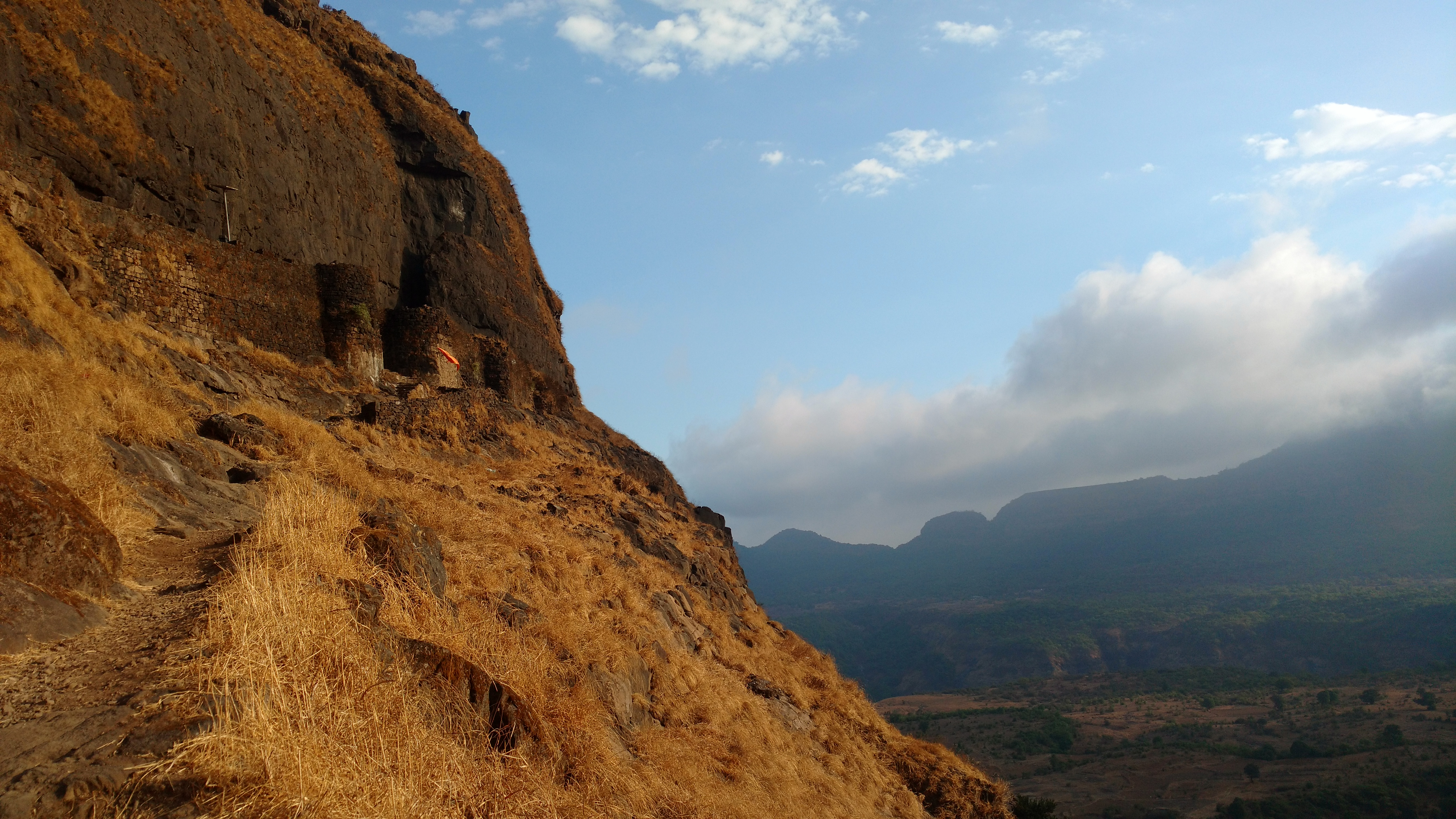
Main gate of the fort

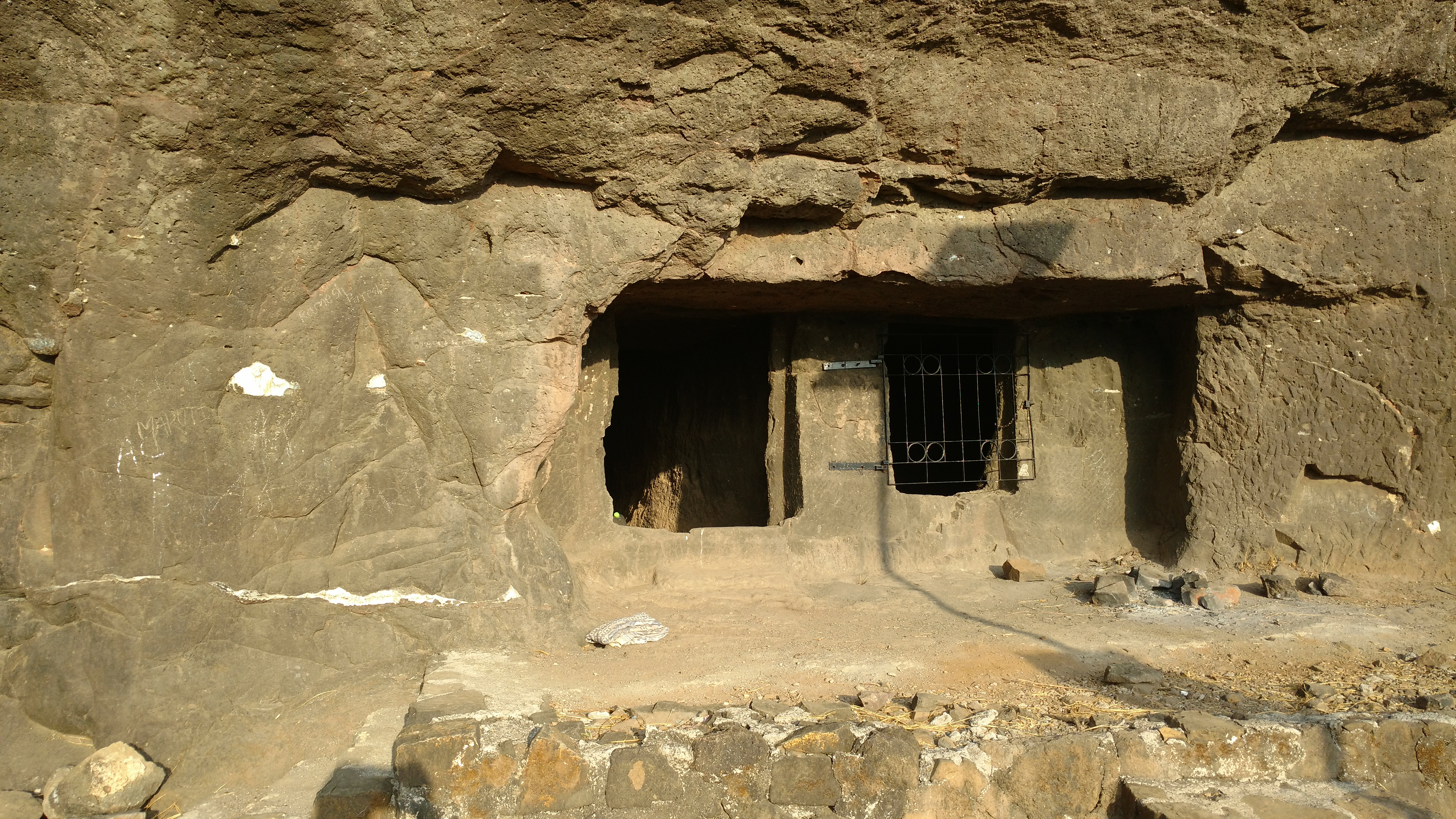
The cave on the fort

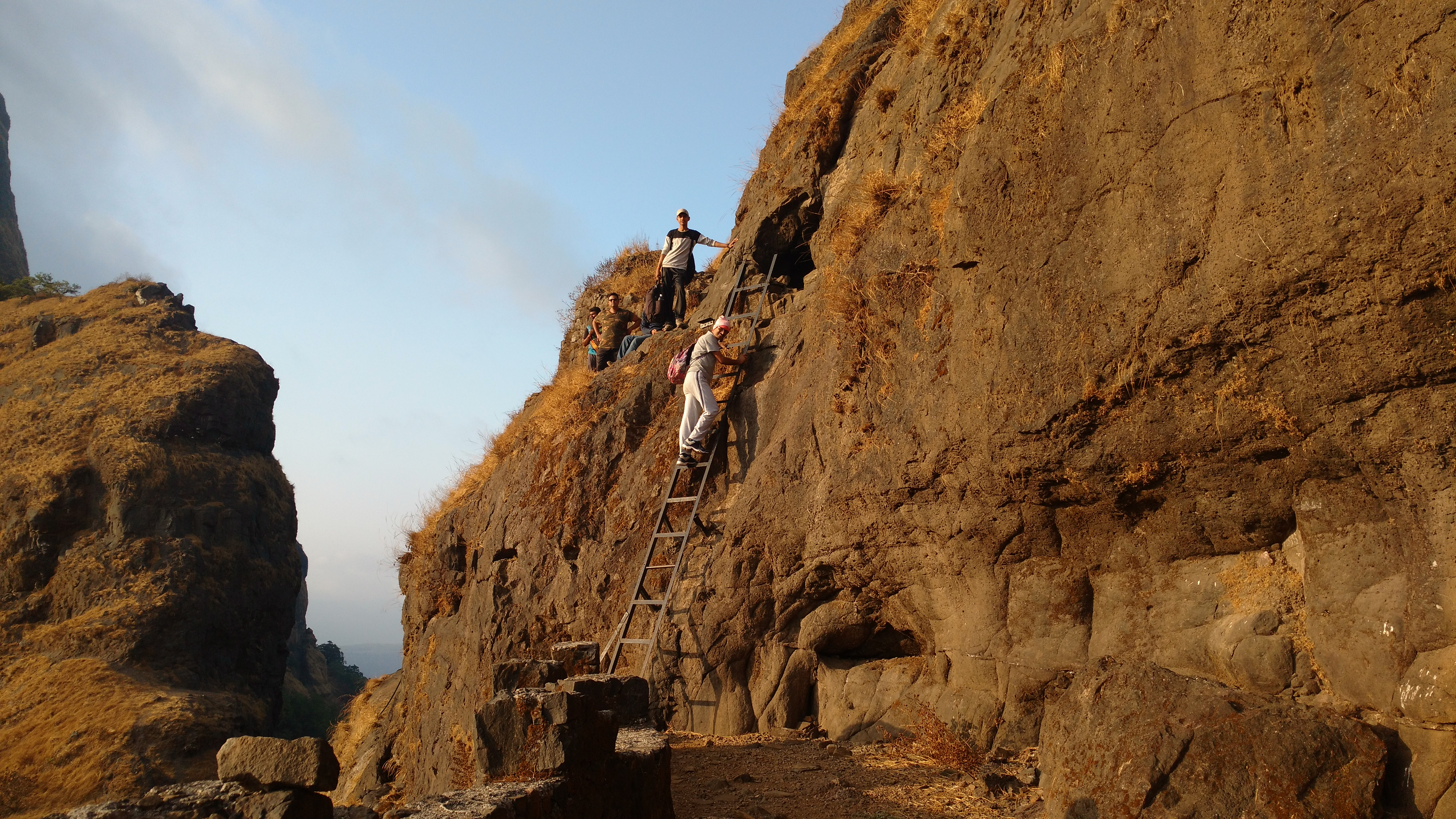
The ladder climb

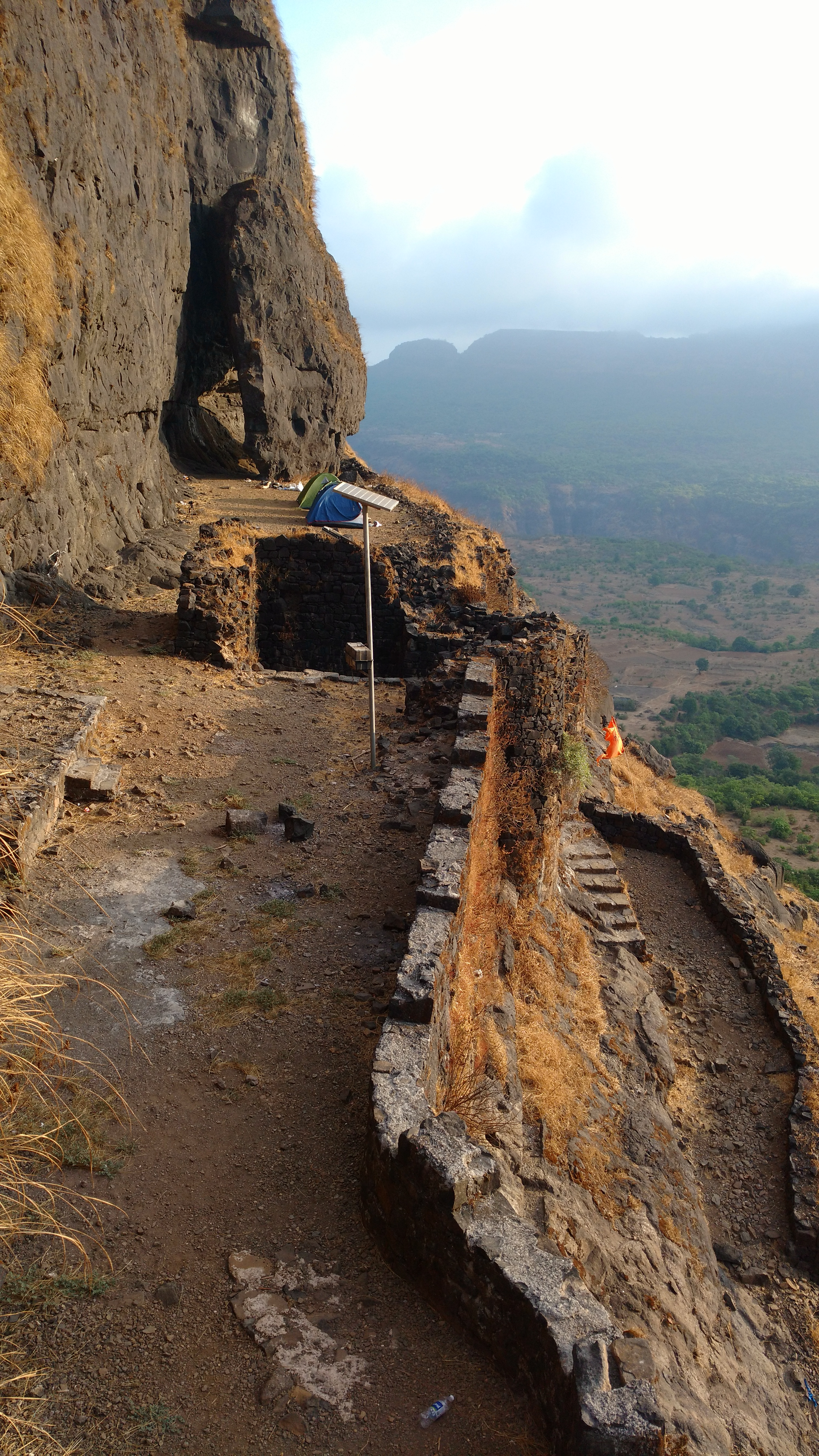
Camping site on the fort

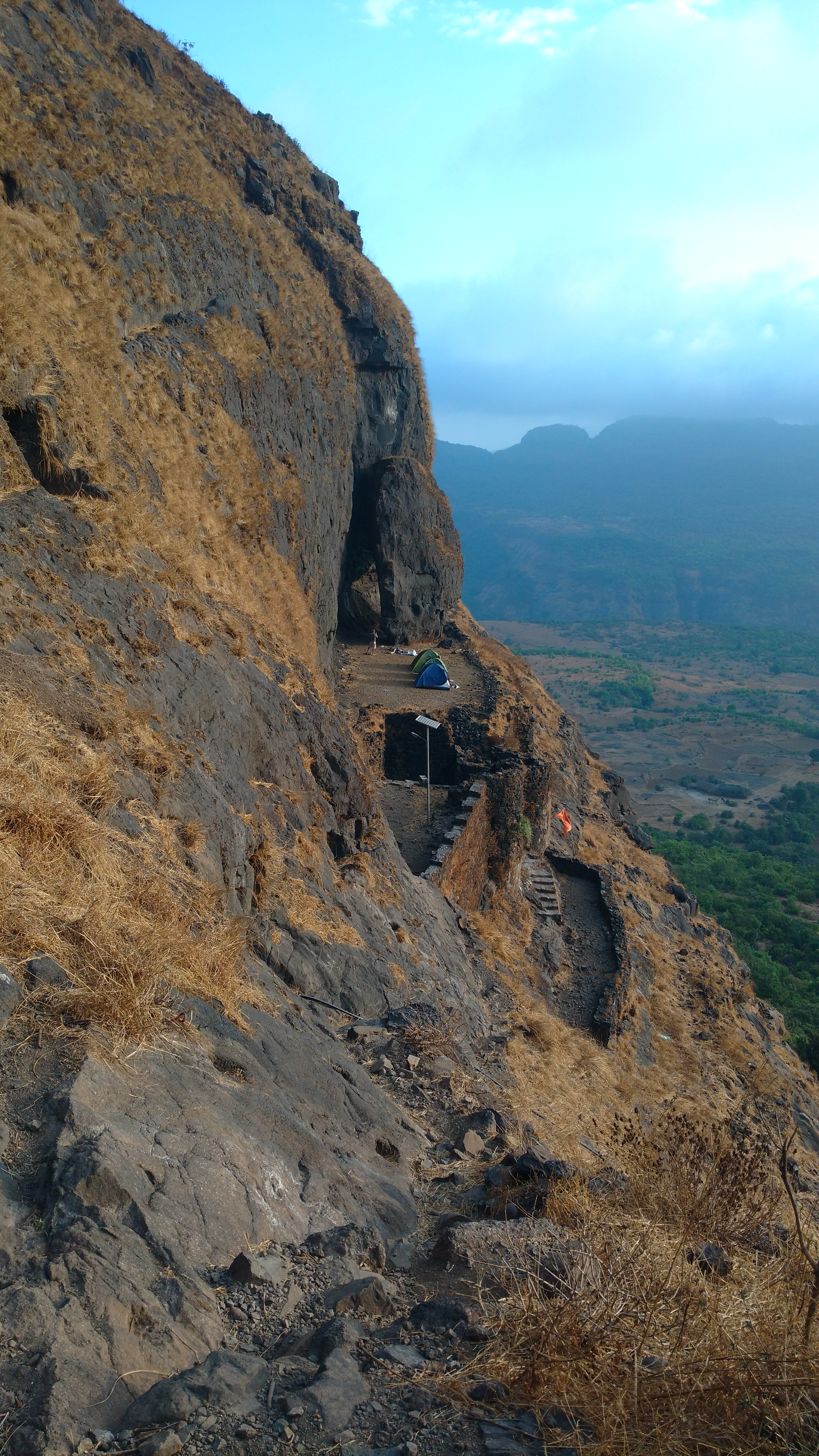
The scarp

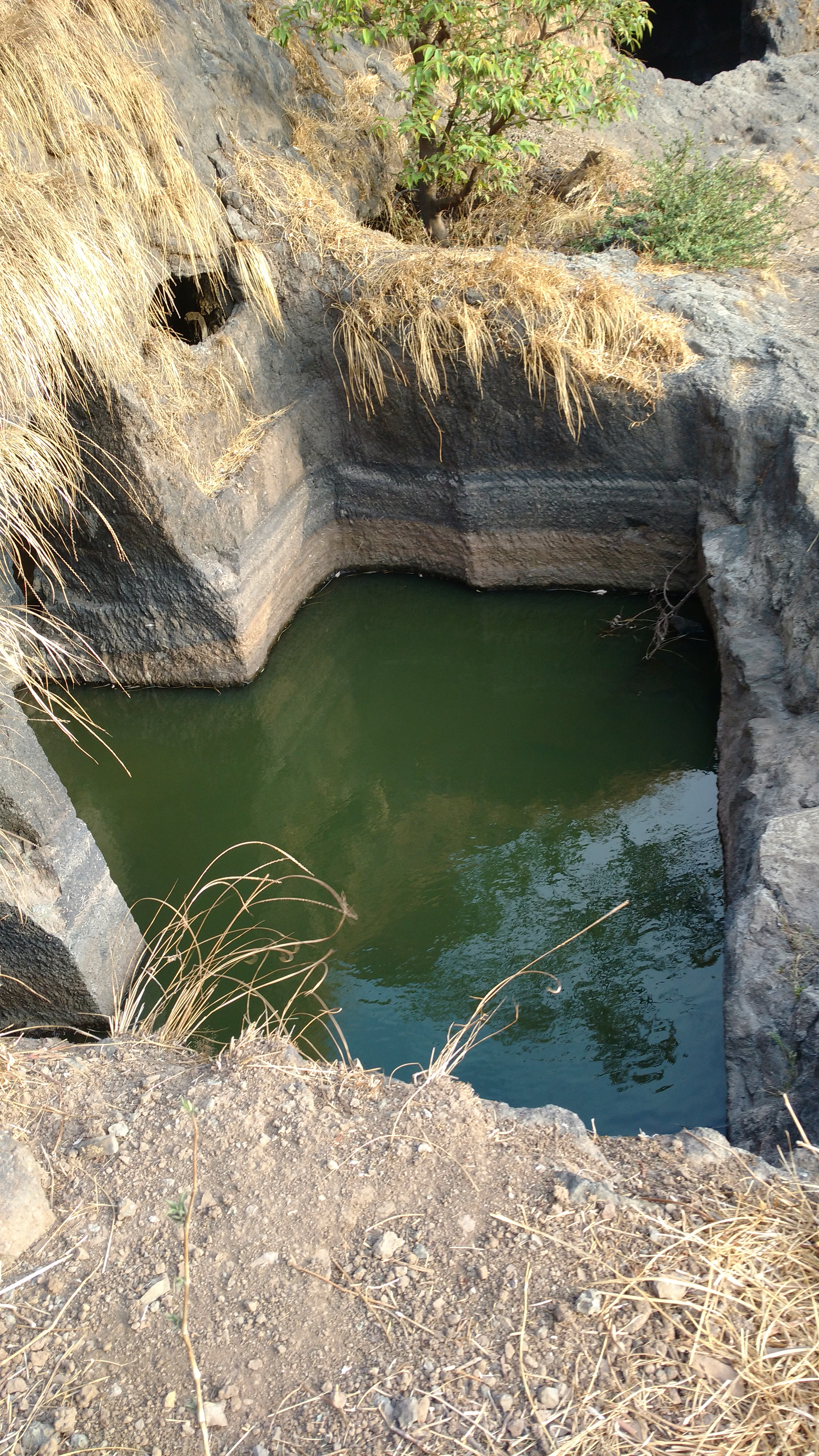
Rockcut water cistern

== See also ==
- List of forts in Maharashtra
- List of forts in India
