= Kandali Tarf Rahur =

Village in Maharashtra

- village
- Location in Maharashtra, India Kandali Tarf Rahur (India)
- Coordinates: 19.3862589°N 73.2323033°E
- Country: India
- State: Maharashtra
- District: Thane
- Taluka: Bhiwandi
- Elevation: 23 m (75 ft)

Population (2011)
  - Total: 579
- Time zone: UTC+5:30 (IST)
- 2011 census code: 552617

Kandali Tarf Rahur is a village in the Thane district of Maharashtra, India. It is located in the Bhiwandi taluka. It is situated between AH47 (Mumbai-Nashik highway) and the Bhatsa River.

== Demographics ==
According to the 2011 census of India, Kandali Tarf Rahur has 140 households. The effective literacy rate (i.e. the literacy rate of population excluding children aged 6 and below) is 80.54%.

Demographics (2011 Census)
	Total	Male	Female
Population	579	295	284
Children aged below 6 years	65	24	41
Scheduled caste	0	0	0
Scheduled tribe	89	43	46
Literates	414	246	168
Workers (all)	304	165	139
Main workers (total)	153	124	29
Main workers: Cultivators	23	19	4
Main workers: Agricultural labourers	16	10	6
Main workers: Household industry workers	16	15	1
Main workers: Other	98	80	18
Marginal workers (total)	151	41	110
Marginal workers: Cultivators	83	4	79
Marginal workers: Agricultural labourers	37	15	22
Marginal workers: Household industry workers	4	3	1
Marginal workers: Others	27	19	8
Non-workers	275	130	145
