= Chiradpada =

Village in Maharashtra, India

- village
- Location in Maharashtra, India Chiradpada (India)
- Coordinates: 19.3260697°N 73.1895367°E
- Country: India
- State: Maharashtra
- District: Thane
- Taluka: Bhiwandi
- Elevation: 14 m (46 ft)

Population (2011)
  - Total: 1,324
- Time zone: UTC+5:30 (IST)
- 2011 census code: 552630

Chiradpada is a village in the Thane district of Maharashtra, India. It is located in the Bhiwandi taluka. It lies on the bank of Bhatsa River.

== Demographics ==
According to the 2011 census of India, Chiradpada has 264 households. The effective literacy rate (i.e. the literacy rate of population excluding children aged 6 and below) is 75.81%.

Demographics (2011 Census)
	Total	Male	Female
Population	1324	674	650
Children aged below 6 years	212	118	94
Scheduled caste	0	0	0
Scheduled tribe	499	252	247
Literates	843	455	388
Workers (all)	365	344	21
Main workers (total)	184	174	10
Main workers: Cultivators	91	88	3
Main workers: Agricultural labourers	6	5	1
Main workers: Household industry workers	1	1	0
Main workers: Other	86	80	6
Marginal workers (total)	181	170	11
Marginal workers: Cultivators	2	1	1
Marginal workers: Agricultural labourers	50	47	3
Marginal workers: Household industry workers	0	0	0
Marginal workers: Others	129	122	7
Non-workers	959	330	629
