= Nandkar =

Village in Maharashtra

- village
- Location in Maharashtra, India Nandkar (India)
- Coordinates: 19.2822375°N 73.1674128°E
- Country: India
- State: Maharashtra
- District: Thane
- Taluka: Bhiwandi
- Elevation: 18 m (59 ft)

Population (2011)
  - Total: 1,603
- Time zone: UTC+5:30 (IST)
- 2011 census code: 552637

Nandkar Koliwada is a village in the Thane district of Maharashtra, India. It is located in the Bhiwandi taluka. The Bhatsa River joins the Kalu River (a tributary of Ulhas River near this village.

== Demographics ==
According to the 2011 census of India, Nandkar has 325 households. The effective literacy rate (i.e. the literacy rate of population excluding children aged 6 and below) is 78.6%.

Demographics (2011 Census)
	Total	Male	Female
Population	1603	830	773
Children aged below 6 years	192	103	89
Scheduled caste	206	111	95
Scheduled tribe	161	82	79
Literates	1109	638	471
Workers (all)	518	439	79
Main workers (total)	374	315	59
Main workers: Cultivators	212	183	29
Main workers: Agricultural labourers	20	12	8
Main workers: Household industry workers	3	3	0
Main workers: Other	139	117	22
Marginal workers (total)	144	124	20
Marginal workers: Cultivators	22	18	4
Marginal workers: Agricultural labourers	58	53	5
Marginal workers: Household industry workers	5	4	1
Marginal workers: Others	59	49	10
Non-workers	1085	391	694
