= Bhoirgaon =

Village in Maharashtra

- village
- Location in Maharashtra, India Bhoirgaon (India)
- Coordinates: 19.3406926°N 73.1386485°E
- Country: India
- State: Maharashtra
- District: Thane
- Taluka: Bhiwandi
- Elevation: 24 m (79 ft)

Population (2011)
  - Total: 396
- Time zone: UTC+5:30 (IST)
- 2011 census code: 552626

Bhoirgaon is a village in the Thane district of Maharashtra, India. It is located in the Bhiwandi taluka.

== Demographics ==
According to the 2011 census of India, Bhoirgaon has 75 households. The effective literacy rate (i.e. the literacy rate of population excluding children aged 6 and below) is 89.64%.

Demographics (2011 Census)
| | Total | Male | Female |
|---|---|---|---|
| Population | 396 | 216 | 180 |
| Children aged below 6 years | 39 | 27 | 12 |
| Scheduled caste | 0 | 0 | 0 |
| Scheduled tribe | 39 | 23 | 16 |
| Literates | 320 | 184 | 136 |
| Workers (all) | 140 | 122 | 18 |
| Main workers (total) | 131 | 113 | 18 |
| Main workers: Cultivators | 99 | 85 | 14 |
| Main workers: Agricultural labourers | 1 | 1 | 0 |
| Main workers: Household industry workers | 1 | 0 | 1 |
| Main workers: Other | 30 | 27 | 3 |
| Marginal workers (total) | 9 | 9 | 0 |
| Marginal workers: Cultivators | 2 | 2 | 0 |
| Marginal workers: Agricultural labourers | 7 | 7 | 0 |
| Marginal workers: Household industry workers | 0 | 0 | 0 |
| Marginal workers: Others | 0 | 0 | 0 |
| Non-workers | 256 | 94 | 162 |
