= Talavali Tarf Rahur =

Village in Maharashtra

- village
- Location in Maharashtra, India Talavali Tarf Rahur (India)
- Coordinates: 19.402426°N 73.2205065°E
- Country: India
- State: Maharashtra
- District: Thane
- Taluka: Bhiwandi
- Elevation: 44 m (144 ft)

Population (2011)
  - Total: 609
- Time zone: UTC+5:30 (IST)
- 2011 census code: 552614

Talavali Tarf Rahur is a village in the Thane district of Maharashtra, India. It is located in the Bhiwandi taluka.

== Demographics ==
According to the 2011 census of India, Talavali Tarf Rahur has 135 households. The effective literacy rate (i.e. the literacy rate of population excluding children aged 6 and below) is 84.36%.

Demographics (2011 Census)
	Total	Male	Female
Population	609	307	302
Children aged below 6 years	104	62	42
Scheduled caste	0	0	0
Scheduled tribe	176	95	81
Literates	426	219	207
Workers (all)	248	179	69
Main workers (total)	109	93	16
Main workers: Cultivators	15	12	3
Main workers: Agricultural labourers	34	30	4
Main workers: Household industry workers	0	0	0
Main workers: Other	60	51	9
Marginal workers (total)	139	86	53
Marginal workers: Cultivators	20	20	0
Marginal workers: Agricultural labourers	91	43	48
Marginal workers: Household industry workers	1	1	0
Marginal workers: Others	27	22	5
Non-workers	361	128	233
