= Bapgaon =

Village in Maharashtra

Bapgaon Bapgaon
- village
- Location in Maharashtra, India Bapgaon (India)
- Coordinates: 19.27922562°N 73.14564228°E
- Country: India
- State: Maharashtra
- District: Thane
- Taluka: Bhiwandi
- Elevation: 15 m (49 ft)

Population (2011)
  - Total: 892
- Time zone: UTC+5:30 (IST)
- 2011 census code: 552648

Bapgaon is a village in the Thane district of Maharashtra, India. It is located in the Bhiwandi taluka. Simplest way to reach there is take a padgha village bus from kalyan bus depot.

== Demographics ==
According to the 2011 census of India, Bapgaon has 181 households. The effective literacy rate (i.e. the literacy rate of population excluding children aged 6 and below) is 78.39%.

Demographics (2011 Census)
	Total	Male	Female
Population	892	470	422
Children aged below 6 years	96	60	36
Scheduled caste	113	57	56
Scheduled tribe	175	84	91
Literates	624	347	277
Workers (all)	308	217	91
Main workers (total)	292	212	80
Main workers: Cultivators	65	52	13
Main workers: Agricultural labourers	73	37	36
Main workers: Household industry workers	18	12	6
Main workers: Other	136	111	25
Marginal workers (total)	16	5	11
Marginal workers: Cultivators	10	2	8
Marginal workers: Agricultural labourers	2	0	2
Marginal workers: Household industry workers	1	1	0
Marginal workers: Others	3	2	1
Non-workers	584	253	331
