= Itade =

Village in Maharashtra

- village
- Location within Maharashtra Location within India
- Coordinates: 19°17′42″N 73°09′43″E
- Country: India
- State: Maharashtra
- District: Thane
- Taluka: Bhiwandi
- Elevation: 20 m (66 ft)

Population (2011)
  - Total: 1,245
- Time zone: UTC+5:30 (IST)
- 2011 census code: 552635

Itade is a village in the Thane district of Maharashtra, India. It is located in the Bhiwandi taluka.

According to Census 2011 information, the location code or village code of Itade village is 552635. It is situated 15km away from sub-district headquarter Bhiwandi and 38km away from district headquarter Thane.

The total geographical area of village is 51.19 hectares. Itade has a total population of 1,245 people. There are about 247 houses in Itade village. As per 2019 stats, Itade villages comes under Bhiwandi Rural assembly & Bhiwandi parliamentary constituency. Kalyan is nearest town to Itade, approximately 10 km away.

== Demographics ==
According to the 2011 census of India, Itade has 247 households. The effective literacy rate (i.e. the literacy rate of population excluding children aged 6 and below) is 77.69%.

Demographics (2011 Census)
	Total	Male	Female
Population	1245	670	575
Children aged below 6 years	165	88	77
Scheduled caste	10	7	3
Scheduled tribe	0	0	0
Literates	839	507	332
Workers (all)	376	349	27
Main workers (total)	204	190	14
Main workers: Cultivators	53	47	6
Main workers: Agricultural labourers	3	1	2
Main workers: Household industry workers	2	2	0
Main workers: Other	146	140	6
Marginal workers (total)	172	159	13
Marginal workers: Cultivators	5	3	2
Marginal workers: Agricultural labourers	146	136	10
Marginal workers: Household industry workers	0	0	0
Marginal workers: Others	21	20	1
Non-workers	869	321	548
