= Kukase =

Village in Maharashtra

- village
- Location in Maharashtra, India Kukase (India)
- Coordinates: 19.3353892°N 73.1450145°E
- Country: India
- State: Maharashtra
- District: Thane
- Taluka: Bhiwandi
- Elevation: 30 m (98 ft)

Population (2011)
  - Total: 806
- Time zone: UTC+5:30 (IST)
- 2011 census code: 552625

Kukase is a village in the Thane district of Maharashtra, India. It is located in the Bhiwandi taluka.

== Demographics ==
According to the 2011 census of India, Kukase has 162 households. The effective literacy rate (i.e. the literacy rate of population excluding children aged 6 and below) is 69.44%.

Demographics (2011 Census)
	Total	Male	Female
Population	806	407	399
Children aged below 6 years	109	47	62
Scheduled caste	14	6	8
Scheduled tribe	153	65	88
Literates	484	290	194
Workers (all)	465	243	222
Main workers (total)	304	185	119
Main workers: Cultivators	158	93	65
Main workers: Agricultural labourers	139	87	52
Main workers: Household industry workers	1	1	0
Main workers: Other	6	4	2
Marginal workers (total)	161	58	103
Marginal workers: Cultivators	34	11	23
Marginal workers: Agricultural labourers	89	29	60
Marginal workers: Household industry workers	5	0	5
Marginal workers: Others	33	18	15
Non-workers	341	164	177
