= Ranjnoli =

Village in Maharashtra

- village
- Location in Maharashtra, India Ranjnoli (India)
- Coordinates: 19.2642163°N 73.0833224°E
- Country: India
- State: Maharashtra
- District: Thane
- Taluka: Bhiwandi
- Elevation: 5 m (16 ft)

Population (2011)
  - Total: 5,618
- Time zone: UTC+5:30 (IST)
- 2011 census code: 552657

Ranjnoli is a village in the Thane district of Maharashtra, India. It is located in the Bhiwandi taluka.

== Demographics ==
According to the 2011 census of India, Ranjnoli has 1504 households. The effective literacy rate (i.e. the literacy rate of population excluding children aged 6 and below) is 86.28%.

Demographics (2011 Census)
	Total	Male	Female
Population	5618	3485	2133
Children aged below 6 years	859	461	398
Scheduled caste	259	164	95
Scheduled tribe	25	16	9
Literates	4106	2769	1337
Workers (all)	2555	2364	191
Main workers (total)	2436	2279	157
Main workers: Cultivators	95	83	12
Main workers: Agricultural labourers	7	6	1
Main workers: Household industry workers	33	24	9
Main workers: Other	2301	2166	135
Marginal workers (total)	119	85	34
Marginal workers: Cultivators	11	5	6
Marginal workers: Agricultural labourers	0	0	0
Marginal workers: Household industry workers	4	1	3
Marginal workers: Others	104	79	25
Non-workers	3063	1121	1942
