= Tarique Momin =

Deputy Mayor of Bhiwandi-Nizampur City Municipal Corporation
- Incumbent
- Assumed office 20 February 2026

Personal details
- Born: Bhiwandi, Maharashtra, India
- Party: Indian National Congress
- Other political affiliations: Samajwadi Party (formerly)
- Parent(s): Abdul Bari (father); Asgarunnisa (mother)
- Education: BNN College, Bhiwandi
- Occupation: Politician, Social Worker

Tarique Momin is an Indian politician from the Indian National Congress who is the current Deputy Mayor of the Bhiwandi-Nizampur City Municipal Corporation (BNCMC). Elected at the age of 34, he is the youngest person to hold the office in the history of the corporation.

== Early life and education ==
Momin was born in Bhiwandi to Abdul Bari and Asgarunnisa. He completed his secondary education at Dr. Omprakash Agarwal English High School in 2007. He pursued higher education at the Bhiwandi Nizampur Nagarpalika College in 2009 (commonly known as BNN College), And completed his graduation in bsc nautical science from B.P marine academy from University of Mumbai.

== Political career ==
Momin began his political career as a member of the Samajwadi Party before joining the Indian National Congress. In the 2026 municipal elections, he contested from Ward No. 9 and was elected as a corporator after defeating the incumbent candidate from the Shiv Sena.

Following the elections, a "Secular Front" alliance was formed between the Congress and a group of independent corporators. On 20 February 2026, Momin was elected Deputy Mayor, securing 43 votes in the 90-member house.

== Social work ==
Momin's public service initiatives include organizing healthcare camps for tuberculosis, HIV diagnostics, and polio eradication. During the COVID-19 pandemic in India, he worked on oxygen supply logistics and hospital bed management in the Bhiwandi region. His administrative focus includes improving public school infrastructure, waste management, and drainage systems in the city.
