= Walshind =

Village in Maharashtra

- village
- Location in Maharashtra, India Walshind (India)
- Coordinates: 19.3054445°N 73.1084052°E
- Country: India
- State: Maharashtra
- District: Thane
- Taluka: Bhiwandi
- Elevation: 25 m (82 ft)

Population (2011)
  - Total: 1,219
- Time zone: UTC+5:30 (IST)
- 2011 census code: 552643

Walshind is a village in the Thane district of Maharashtra, India. It is located in the Bhiwandi taluka. It lies on the Mumbai-Nashik road.

== Demographics ==
According to the 2011 census of India, Walshind has 230 households. The effective literacy rate (i.e. the literacy rate of population excluding children aged 6 and below) is 68.67%.

Demographics (2011 Census)
	Total	Male	Female
Population	1219	645	574
Children aged below 6 years	220	113	107
Scheduled caste	46	28	18
Scheduled tribe	453	227	226
Literates	686	415	271
Workers (all)	493	359	134
Main workers (total)	436	318	118
Main workers: Cultivators	99	58	41
Main workers: Agricultural labourers	43	24	19
Main workers: Household industry workers	5	2	3
Main workers: Other	289	234	55
Marginal workers (total)	57	41	16
Marginal workers: Cultivators	8	5	3
Marginal workers: Agricultural labourers	16	14	2
Marginal workers: Household industry workers	1	0	1
Marginal workers: Others	32	22	10
Non-workers	726	286	440
