= Kiravali Tarf Sonale =

Village in Maharashtra

- village
- Location in Maharashtra, India Kiravali Tarf Sonale (India)
- Coordinates: 19.3052679°N 73.1674128°E
- Country: India
- State: Maharashtra
- District: Thane
- Taluka: Bhiwandi
- Elevation: 20 m (66 ft)

Population (2011)
  - Total: 1,264
- Time zone: UTC+5:30 (IST)
- 2011 census code: 552632

Kiravali Tarf Sonale is a village in the Thane district of Maharashtra, India. It is located in the Bhiwandi taluka.

== Demographics ==
According to the 2011 census of India, Kiravali Tarf Sonale has 245 households. The effective literacy rate (i.e. the literacy rate of population excluding children aged 6 and below) is 78.06%.

Demographics (2011 Census)
| | Total | Male | Female |
|---|---|---|---|
| Population | 1264 | 641 | 623 |
| Children aged below 6 years | 202 | 106 | 96 |
| Scheduled caste | 0 | 0 | 0 |
| Scheduled tribe | 299 | 145 | 154 |
| Literates | 829 | 468 | 361 |
| Workers (all) | 521 | 345 | 176 |
| Main workers (total) | 390 | 312 | 78 |
| Main workers: Cultivators | 98 | 78 | 20 |
| Main workers: Agricultural labourers | 99 | 71 | 28 |
| Main workers: Household industry workers | 19 | 13 | 6 |
| Main workers: Other | 174 | 150 | 24 |
| Marginal workers (total) | 131 | 33 | 98 |
| Marginal workers: Cultivators | 81 | 20 | 61 |
| Marginal workers: Agricultural labourers | 30 | 5 | 25 |
| Marginal workers: Household industry workers | 1 | 0 | 1 |
| Marginal workers: Others | 19 | 8 | 11 |
| Non-workers | 743 | 296 | 447 |
