= Devali =

Village in Maharashtra

Devli
- village
- Location in Maharashtra, India Devli (India)
- Coordinates: 19.6895076°N 73.1497121°E
- Country: India
- State: Maharashtra
- District: Thane
- Taluka: Bhiwandi
- Elevation: 62 m (203 ft)

Population (2011)
  - Total: 565
- Time zone: UTC+5:30 (IST)
- 2011 census code: 552612

Devali is a village in the Thane district of Maharashtra, India. It is located in the Bhiwandi taluka. It lies on the Wada-Malwada Road.

== Demographics ==
According to the 2011 census of India, Devali has 108 households. The effective literacy rate (i.e. the literacy rate of population excluding children aged 6 and below) is 78.83%.

Demographics (2011 Census)
	Total	Male	Female
Population	565	281	284
Children aged below 6 years	121	61	60
Scheduled caste	9	4	5
Scheduled tribe	17	7	10
Literates	350	187	163
Workers (all)	161	133	28
Main workers (total)	157	131	26
Main workers: Cultivators	24	24	0
Main workers: Agricultural labourers	41	33	8
Main workers: Household industry workers	2	1	1
Main workers: Other	90	73	17
Marginal workers (total)	4	2	2
Marginal workers: Cultivators	0	0	0
Marginal workers: Agricultural labourers	2	1	1
Marginal workers: Household industry workers	1	0	1
Marginal workers: Others	1	1	0
Non-workers	404	148	256
