= Devrung =

Village in Maharashtra

- village
- Location in Maharashtra, India Devrung (India)
- Coordinates: 19.282146°N 73.1511872°E
- Country: India
- State: Maharashtra
- District: Thane
- Taluka: Bhiwandi
- Elevation: 15 m (49 ft)

Population (2011)
  - Total: 1,937
- Time zone: UTC+5:30 (IST)
- 2011 census code: 552636

Devrung is a village in the Thane district of Maharashtra, India. It is located in the Bhiwandi taluka.

== Demographics ==
According to the 2011 census of India, Devrung has 387 households. The effective literacy rate (i.e. the literacy rate of population excluding children aged 6 and below) is 79.06%.

Demographics (2011 Census)
	Total	Male	Female
Population	1937	977	960
Children aged below 6 years	251	121	130
Scheduled caste	62	32	30
Scheduled tribe	117	52	65
Literates	1333	763	570
Workers (all)	614	540	74
Main workers (total)	335	290	45
Main workers: Cultivators	80	74	6
Main workers: Agricultural labourers	17	16	1
Main workers: Household industry workers	7	5	2
Main workers: Other	231	195	36
Marginal workers (total)	279	250	29
Marginal workers: Cultivators	85	81	4
Marginal workers: Agricultural labourers	33	26	7
Marginal workers: Household industry workers	3	1	2
Marginal workers: Others	158	142	16
Non-workers	1323	437	886
