= Tushar Choudhary =

- तुषार चौधरी

Mayor of Bhiwandi-Nizampur Municipal Corporation
- Incumbent
- Assumed office 2014

Personal details
- Party: Shiv Sena
- Website: tusharchoudhari.com

Tushar Yashvant Choudhary (Marathi: तुषार यशवंत चौधरी) is a Shiv Sena Politician from Thane district, Maharashtra. He was the mayor of Bhiwandi-Nizampur Municipal Corporation. He has been elected as corporator for one consecutive term.

== Positions held ==
- 2007: Elected as corporator in Bhiwandi-Nizampur Municipal Corporation
- 2012: Re-elected as corporator in Bhiwandi-Nizampur Municipal Corporation
- 2015: Elected as Mayor of Bhiwandi-Nizampur Municipal Corporation
