= Pimpalner, Bhiwandi =

Village in Maharashtra

Dongarali-Pimpalner
- village
- Location in Maharashtra, India Dongarali-Pimpalner (India)
- Coordinates: 19.2567833°N 73.0656152°E
- Country: India
- State: Maharashtra
- District: Thane
- Taluka: Bhiwandi
- Elevation: 19 m (62 ft)

Population (2011)
  - Total: 2,258
- Time zone: UTC+5:30 (IST)
- 2011 census code: 552661

Pimpalner is a village in the Thane district of Maharashtra, India. It is located in the Bhiwandi taluka.

== Demographics ==
According to the 2011 census of India, Pimpalner has 444 households. The effective literacy rate (i.e. the literacy rate of population excluding children aged 6 and below) is 83.73%.

Demographics (2011 Census)
	Total	Male	Female
Population	2258	1240	1018
Children aged below 6 years	304	170	134
Scheduled caste	0	0	0
Scheduled tribe	151	72	79
Literates	1636	975	661
Workers (all)	838	740	98
Main workers (total)	733	665	68
Main workers: Cultivators	97	82	15
Main workers: Agricultural labourers	16	12	4
Main workers: Household industry workers	11	8	3
Main workers: Other	609	563	46
Marginal workers (total)	105	75	30
Marginal workers: Cultivators	10	8	2
Marginal workers: Agricultural labourers	10	6	4
Marginal workers: Household industry workers	7	3	4
Marginal workers: Others	78	58	20
Non-workers	1420	500	920
