= Janwal =

Village in Maharashtra

- village
- Location in Maharashtra, India Janwal (India)
- Coordinates: 19.306288°N 73.1401237°E
- Country: India
- State: Maharashtra
- District: Thane
- Taluka: Bhiwandi
- Elevation: 15 m (49 ft)

Population (2011)
  - Total: 482
- Time zone: UTC+5:30 (IST)
- 2011 census code: 552645

Janwal is a village in the Thane district of Maharashtra, India. It is located in the Bhiwandi taluka.

== Demographics ==
According to the 2011 census of India, Janwal has 97 households. The effective literacy rate (i.e. the literacy rate of population excluding children aged 6 and below) is 78.16%.

Demographics (2011 Census)
	Total	Male	Female
Population	482	244	238
Children aged below 6 years	79	36	43
Scheduled caste	0	0	0
Scheduled tribe	143	71	72
Literates	315	173	142
Workers (all)	128	124	4
Main workers (total)	102	98	4
Main workers: Cultivators	16	16	0
Main workers: Agricultural labourers	5	5	0
Main workers: Household industry workers	3	3	0
Main workers: Other	78	74	4
Marginal workers (total)	26	26	0
Marginal workers: Cultivators	0	0	0
Marginal workers: Agricultural labourers	9	9	0
Marginal workers: Household industry workers	2	2	0
Marginal workers: Others	15	15	0
Non-workers	354	120	234
