= Garshakurthy =

Garshakurthy (also known as Garsekurthi, Telugu: గర్షకుర్తి or గరిశకుర్తి) is the major village in Gangadhara Mandal of the Karimnagar District, Telangana, India. It is about 25 km north-west of Karimnagar, the nearest city. Its pincode is 505445.

== Etymology ==
The name "Garshakurthy" derived from the Telugu word "garise" , which means "a place to store grains or a warehouse". It implies that this village area was used to be warehouse in olden days.

== Description ==
Garshakurthy has a population of more than 10,000. It has an elevation of 361 meters (1,184 feet).

The major temples in the village are Sri Venkateshwara temple and Shiva bhakta Markandeya temple. On the occasion of Holi, people in the village celebrate a temple fair at Venkateshwara temple called Kamuni Purnima jatara.

The main professions in this village include farming, weaving and beedi rolling, with most of the workers employed on the looms. Many people have migrated to places like Bhiwandi, Mumbai, Saudi Arabia, Dubai, and Muscat for work in the textile industry. Many people here are dependent on agriculture.

== Demographics ==
As of 2010 there were 6,653 people living in Garshakurthy. There were 3,242 males and 3,411 females living in 1,577 households. The area of the village is 5.4 sq mi (13.9 km^{2}).

== Temples ==
1) Sri Venkateshwara swamy Temple, was built more than 400 years ago, by the family of Kalvakota and has been maintained by their family.

2) Markandeya Temple was built around 60 years ago, by Padmashalis.
