= Sawandhe =

Village in Maharashtra

- village
- Location in Maharashtra, India Sawandhe (India)
- Coordinates: 19.3240905°N 73.0774202°E
- Country: India
- State: Maharashtra
- District: Thane
- Taluka: Bhiwandi
- Elevation: 14 m (46 ft)

Population (2011)
  - Total: 2,807
- Time zone: UTC+5:30 (IST)
- 2011 census code: 552638

Sawandhe is a village in the Thane district of Maharashtra, India. It is located in the Bhiwandi taluka.

== Demographics ==
According to the 2011 census of India, Sawandhe has 700 households. The effective literacy rate (i.e. the literacy rate of population excluding children aged 6 and below) is 78.62%.

Demographics (2011 Census)
	Total	Male	Female
Population	2807	1951	856
Children aged below 6 years	351	192	159
Scheduled caste	252	165	87
Scheduled tribe	402	283	119
Literates	1931	1456	475
Workers (all)	1545	1454	91
Main workers (total)	1497	1426	71
Main workers: Cultivators	64	56	8
Main workers: Agricultural labourers	9	8	1
Main workers: Household industry workers	25	13	12
Main workers: Other	1399	1349	50
Marginal workers (total)	48	28	20
Marginal workers: Cultivators	4	2	2
Marginal workers: Agricultural labourers	5	3	2
Marginal workers: Household industry workers	1	0	1
Marginal workers: Others	38	23	15
Non-workers	1262	497	765
