= Muthaval =

Village in Maharashtra

- village
- Location in Maharashtra, India Muthaval (India)
- Coordinates: 19.291153°N 73.1474995°E
- Country: India
- State: Maharashtra
- District: Thane
- Taluka: Bhiwandi
- Elevation: 11 m (36 ft)

Population (2011)
  - Total: 591
- Time zone: UTC+5:30 (IST)
- 2011 census code: 552647

Muthaval is a village in the Thane district of Maharashtra, India. It is located in the Bhiwandi taluka.

== Demographics ==
According to the 2011 census of India, Muthaval has 123 households. The effective literacy rate (i.e. the literacy rate of population excluding children aged 6 and below) is 94.3%.

Demographics (2011 Census)
	Total	Male	Female
Population	591	322	269
Children aged below 6 years	65	35	30
Scheduled caste	0	0	0
Scheduled tribe	13	8	5
Literates	496	280	216
Workers (all)	207	193	14
Main workers (total)	202	190	12
Main workers: Cultivators	55	50	5
Main workers: Agricultural labourers	1	1	0
Main workers: Household industry workers	12	10	2
Main workers: Other	134	129	5
Marginal workers (total)	5	3	2
Marginal workers: Cultivators	1	1	0
Marginal workers: Agricultural labourers	1	1	0
Marginal workers: Household industry workers	0	0	0
Marginal workers: Others	3	1	2
Non-workers	384	129	255
