= Elkunde =

Village in Maharashtra

- village
- Location in Maharashtra, India Elkunde (India)
- Coordinates: 19.2944906°N 73.1143067°E
- Country: India
- State: Maharashtra
- District: Thane
- Taluka: Bhiwandi
- Elevation: 13 m (43 ft)

Population (2011)
  - Total: 725
- Time zone: UTC+5:30 (IST)
- 2011 census code: 552650

Elkunde is a village in the Thane district of Maharashtra, India. It is located in the Bhiwandi taluka.

== Demographics ==
According to the 2011 census of India, Elkunde has 146 households. The effective literacy rate (i.e. the literacy rate of population excluding children aged 6 and below) is 79.56%.

Demographics (2011 Census)
	Total	Male	Female
Population	725	395	330
Children aged below 6 years	89	35	54
Scheduled caste	4	1	3
Scheduled tribe	6	1	5
Literates	506	325	181
Workers (all)	289	249	40
Main workers (total)	261	234	27
Main workers: Cultivators	44	39	5
Main workers: Agricultural labourers	1	0	1
Main workers: Household industry workers	4	4	0
Main workers: Other	212	191	21
Marginal workers (total)	28	15	13
Marginal workers: Cultivators	15	7	8
Marginal workers: Agricultural labourers	0	0	0
Marginal workers: Household industry workers	1	1	0
Marginal workers: Others	12	7	5
Non-workers	436	146	290
