= Lonad =

Village in Maharashtra

- village
- Location in Maharashtra, India Lonad (India)
- Coordinates: 19.2980234°N 73.1364357°E
- Country: India
- State: Maharashtra
- District: Thane
- Taluka: Bhiwandi
- Elevation: 15 m (49 ft)

Population (2011)
  - Total: 2,409
- Time zone: UTC+5:30 (IST)
- Postal code: 421302
- 2011 census code: 552646

Lonad is a village in the Thane district of Maharashtra, India. It is located in the Bhiwandi taluka.

== Demographics ==
According to the 2011 census of India, Lonad has 474 households. The effective literacy rate (i.e. the literacy rate of population excluding children aged 6 and below) is 75.22%.

Demographics (2011 Census)
	Total	Male	Female
Population	2409	1297	1112
Children aged below 6 years	331	189	142
Scheduled caste	153	90	63
Scheduled tribe	407	195	212
Literates	1563	931	632
Workers (all)	1250	734	516
Main workers (total)	974	683	291
Main workers: Cultivators	107	66	41
Main workers: Agricultural labourers	138	35	103
Main workers: Household industry workers	60	34	26
Main workers: Other	669	548	121
Marginal workers (total)	276	51	225
Marginal workers: Cultivators	70	16	54
Marginal workers: Agricultural labourers	44	16	28
Marginal workers: Household industry workers	8	5	3
Marginal workers: Others	154	14	140
Non-workers	1159	563	596
