= Vashere =

Village in Maharashtra

- village
- Location in Maharashtra, India Vashere (India)
- Coordinates: 19.3334998°N 73.1615127°E
- Country: India
- State: Maharashtra
- District: Thane
- Taluka: Bhiwandi
- Elevation: 23 m (75 ft)

Population (2011)
  - Total: 560
- Time zone: UTC+5:30 (IST)
- 2011 census code: 552624

Vashere is a village in the Thane district of Maharashtra, India. It is located in the Bhiwandi taluka.

== Demographics ==
According to the 2011 census of India, Vashere has 108 households. The effective literacy rate (i.e. the literacy rate of population excluding children aged 6 and below) is 89.45%.

Demographics (2011 Census)
	Total	Male	Female
Population	560	325	235
Children aged below 6 years	67	41	26
Scheduled caste	1	1	0
Scheduled tribe	0	0	0
Literates	441	274	167
Workers (all)	218	196	22
Main workers (total)	212	194	18
Main workers: Cultivators	72	67	5
Main workers: Agricultural labourers	9	5	4
Main workers: Household industry workers	2	0	2
Main workers: Other	129	122	7
Marginal workers (total)	6	2	4
Marginal workers: Cultivators	3	1	2
Marginal workers: Agricultural labourers	3	1	2
Marginal workers: Household industry workers	0	0	0
Marginal workers: Others	0	0	0
Non-workers	342	129	213
