= Bhawale =

Village in Maharashtra

- village
- Location in Maharashtra, India Bhawale (India)
- Coordinates: 19.3061006°N 73.1305349°E
- Country: India
- State: Maharashtra
- District: Thane
- Taluka: Bhiwandi
- Elevation: 15 m (49 ft)

Population (2011)
  - Total: 705
- Time zone: UTC+5:30 (IST)
- 2011 census code: 552644

Bhawale is a village in the Thane district of Maharashtra, India. It is located in the Bhiwandi taluka. The Apsan Canine Resort is located here.

== Demographics ==
According to the 2011 census of India, Bhawale has 133 households. The effective literacy rate (i.e. the literacy rate of population excluding children aged 6 and below) is 76.56%.

Demographics (2011 Census)
	Total	Male	Female
Population	705	360	345
Children aged below 6 years	95	46	49
Scheduled caste	0	0	0
Scheduled tribe	118	56	62
Literates	467	270	197
Workers (all)	257	183	74
Main workers (total)	203	168	35
Main workers: Cultivators	12	11	1
Main workers: Agricultural labourers	9	5	4
Main workers: Household industry workers	14	12	2
Main workers: Other	168	140	28
Marginal workers (total)	54	15	39
Marginal workers: Cultivators	16	3	13
Marginal workers: Agricultural labourers	21	6	15
Marginal workers: Household industry workers	10	4	6
Marginal workers: Others	7	2	5
Non-workers	448	177	271
