= Gholgaon =

Village in Maharashtra

- village
- Location in Maharashtra, India Gholgaon (India)
- Coordinates: 19.2768453°N 73.0951264°E
- Country: India
- State: Maharashtra
- District: Thane
- Taluka: Bhiwandi
- Elevation: 8 m (26 ft)

Population (2011)
  - Total: 1,297
- Time zone: UTC+5:30 (IST)
- 2011 census code: 552652

Gholgaon is a village in the Thane district of Maharashtra, India. It is located in the Bhiwandi taluka.

== Demographics ==
According to the 2011 census of India, Gholgaon has 318 households. The effective literacy rate (i.e. the literacy rate of population excluding children aged 6 and below) is 68.36%.

Demographics (2011 Census)
	Total	Male	Female
Population	1297	761	536
Children aged below 6 years	197	108	89
Scheduled caste	35	34	1
Scheduled tribe	297	153	144
Literates	752	496	256
Workers (all)	578	499	79
Main workers (total)	483	435	48
Main workers: Cultivators	17	15	2
Main workers: Agricultural labourers	5	3	2
Main workers: Household industry workers	5	4	1
Main workers: Other	456	413	43
Marginal workers (total)	95	64	31
Marginal workers: Cultivators	5	2	3
Marginal workers: Agricultural labourers	0	0	0
Marginal workers: Household industry workers	0	0	0
Marginal workers: Others	90	62	28
Non-workers	719	262	457
