= Gorsai =

Village in Maharashtra

- village
- Location in Maharashtra, India Gorsai (India)
- Coordinates: 19.333005°N 73.0803713°E
- Country: India
- State: Maharashtra
- District: Thane
- Taluka: Bhiwandi
- Elevation: 14 m (46 ft)

Population (2011)
  - Total: 2,274
- Time zone: UTC+5:30 (IST)
- 2011 census code: 552639

Gorsai is a village in the Thane district of Maharashtra, India. It is located in the Bhiwandi taluka.

== Demographics ==
According to the 2011 census of India, Gorsai has 452 households. The effective literacy rate (i.e. the literacy rate of population excluding children aged 6 and below) is 81.5%.

Demographics (2011 Census)
| | Total | Male | Female |
|---|---|---|---|
| Population | 2274 | 1159 | 1115 |
| Children aged below 6 years | 333 | 159 | 174 |
| Scheduled caste | 249 | 123 | 126 |
| Scheduled tribe | 160 | 79 | 81 |
| Literates | 1582 | 882 | 700 |
| Workers (all) | 758 | 626 | 132 |
| Main workers (total) | 544 | 483 | 61 |
| Main workers: Cultivators | 79 | 69 | 10 |
| Main workers: Agricultural labourers | 1 | 1 | 0 |
| Main workers: Household industry workers | 15 | 13 | 2 |
| Main workers: Other | 449 | 400 | 49 |
| Marginal workers (total) | 214 | 143 | 71 |
| Marginal workers: Cultivators | 27 | 20 | 7 |
| Marginal workers: Agricultural labourers | 13 | 8 | 5 |
| Marginal workers: Household industry workers | 14 | 11 | 3 |
| Marginal workers: Others | 160 | 104 | 56 |
| Non-workers | 1516 | 533 | 983 |
