= Usroli =

Village in Maharashtra

- village
- Location in Maharashtra, India Usroli (India)
- Coordinates: 19.3270884°N 73.1393861°E
- Country: India
- State: Maharashtra
- District: Thane
- Taluka: Bhiwandi
- Elevation: 35 m (115 ft)

Population (2011)
  - Total: 661
- Time zone: UTC+5:30 (IST)
- 2011 census code: 552627

Usroli is a village in the Thane district of Maharashtra, India. It is located in the Bhiwandi taluka.

== Demographics ==
According to the 2011 census of India, Usroli has 125 households. The effective literacy rate (i.e. the literacy rate of population excluding children aged 6 and below) is 75.52%.

Demographics (2011 Census)
	Total	Male	Female
Population	661	338	323
Children aged below 6 years	85	37	48
Scheduled caste	42	20	22
Scheduled tribe	77	37	40
Literates	435	246	189
Workers (all)	336	193	143
Main workers (total)	328	188	140
Main workers: Cultivators	247	137	110
Main workers: Agricultural labourers	0	0	0
Main workers: Household industry workers	0	0	0
Main workers: Other	81	51	30
Marginal workers (total)	8	5	3
Marginal workers: Cultivators	4	2	2
Marginal workers: Agricultural labourers	0	0	0
Marginal workers: Household industry workers	0	0	0
Marginal workers: Others	4	3	1
Non-workers	325	145	180
