= Pimpalas, Bhiwandi =

Village in Maharashtra

Pimplas Pimpalas
- village
- Location in Maharashtra, India Pimplas (India)
- Coordinates: 19.2508479°N 73.0788957°E
- Country: India
- State: Maharashtra
- District: Thane
- Taluka: Bhiwandi
- Elevation: 4 m (13 ft)

Population (2011)
  - Total: 3,935
- Time zone: UTC+5:30 (IST)
- PIN: 421311
- 2011 census code: 552660

Pimplas is a village in the Thane district of Maharashtra, India. It is located in the Bhiwandi taluka.

== Demographics ==
According to the 2011 census of India, Pimplas has 768 households. The effective literacy rate (i.e. the literacy rate of population excluding children aged 6 and below) is 81.5%.

Demographics (2011 Census)
	Total	Male	Female
Population	3935	2008	1927
Children aged below 6 years	546	280	266
Scheduled caste	37	24	13
Scheduled tribe	324	161	163
Literates	2762	1517	1245
Workers (all)	1369	1152	217
Main workers (total)	1236	1071	165
Main workers: Cultivators	317	248	69
Main workers: Agricultural labourers	25	17	8
Main workers: Household industry workers	58	44	14
Main workers: Other	836	762	74
Marginal workers (total)	133	81	52
Marginal workers: Cultivators	20	11	9
Marginal workers: Agricultural labourers	11	5	6
Marginal workers: Household industry workers	2	2	0
Marginal workers: Others	100	63	37
Non-workers	2566	856	1710
