= Shivnagar =

Village in Maharashtra

Shivnagar Choudharpada
- village
- Location in Maharashtra, India Shivnagar (India)
- Coordinates: 19.287557°N 73.135248°E
- Country: India
- State: Maharashtra
- District: Thane
- Taluka: Bhiwandi
- Elevation: 15 m (49 ft)

Population (2011)
  - Total: 3,030
- Time zone: UTC+5:30 (IST)
- Postal code: 421302
- 2011 census code: 552649

Shivnagar is a village in the Thane district of Maharashtra, India. It is located in the Bhiwandi taluka.

== Demographics ==
According to the 2011 census of India, Shivnagar has 556 households. The effective literacy rate (i.e. the literacy rate of population excluding children aged 6 and below) is 77.9%.

Demographics (2011 Census)
	Total	Male	Female
Population	3030	1549	1481
Children aged below 6 years	437	232	205
Scheduled caste	10	7	3
Scheduled tribe	58	28	30
Literates	2020	1133	887
Workers (all)	1067	778	289
Main workers (total)	848	678	170
Main workers: Cultivators	250	182	68
Main workers: Agricultural labourers	14	12	2
Main workers: Household industry workers	23	13	10
Main workers: Other	561	471	90
Marginal workers (total)	219	100	119
Marginal workers: Cultivators	110	19	91
Marginal workers: Agricultural labourers	7	4	3
Marginal workers: Household industry workers	12	5	7
Marginal workers: Others	90	72	18
Non-workers	1963	771	1192
