= Khandval =

Village in Maharashtra

- village
- Location in Maharashtra, India Khandval (India)
- Coordinates: 19.3164108°N 73.148237°E
- Country: India
- State: Maharashtra
- District: Thane
- Taluka: Bhiwandi
- Elevation: 27 m (89 ft)

Population (2011)
  - Total: 440
- Time zone: UTC+5:30 (IST)
- 2011 census code: 552628

Khandval is a village in the Thane district of Maharashtra, India. It is located in the Bhiwandi taluka.

== Demographics ==
According to the 2011 census of India, Khandval has 77 households. The effective literacy rate (i.e. the literacy rate of population excluding children aged 6 and below) is 82.26%.

Demographics (2011 Census)
	Total	Male	Female
Population	440	231	209
Children aged below 6 years	51	23	28
Scheduled caste	0	0	0
Scheduled tribe	11	7	4
Literates	320	185	135
Workers (all)	249	130	119
Main workers (total)	120	112	8
Main workers: Cultivators	47	43	4
Main workers: Agricultural labourers	50	48	2
Main workers: Household industry workers	0	0	0
Main workers: Other	23	21	2
Marginal workers (total)	129	18	111
Marginal workers: Cultivators	6	5	1
Marginal workers: Agricultural labourers	122	13	109
Marginal workers: Household industry workers	0	0	0
Marginal workers: Others	1	0	1
Non-workers	191	101	90
