= Kailasnagar =

Village in Maharashtra

- village
- Location in Maharashtra, India Kailasnagar (India)
- Coordinates: 19.2683683°N 73.0361003°E
- Country: India
- State: Maharashtra
- District: Thane
- Taluka: Bhiwandi
- Elevation: 16 m (52 ft)

Population (2011)
  - Total: 707
- Time zone: UTC+5:30 (IST)
- 2011 census code: 552664

Kailasnagar is a village in the Thane district of Maharashtra, India. It is located in the Bhiwandi taluka.

== Demographics ==
According to the 2011 census of India, Kailasnagar has 155 households. The effective literacy rate (i.e. the literacy rate of population excluding children aged 6 and below) is 85.86%.

Demographics (2011 Census)
	Total	Male	Female
Population	707	457	250
Children aged below 6 years	99	52	47
Scheduled caste	14	3	11
Scheduled tribe	0	0	0
Literates	522	368	154
Workers (all)	355	342	13
Main workers (total)	347	334	13
Main workers: Cultivators	10	10	0
Main workers: Agricultural labourers	0	0	0
Main workers: Household industry workers	1	0	1
Main workers: Other	336	324	12
Marginal workers (total)	8	8	0
Marginal workers: Cultivators	1	1	0
Marginal workers: Agricultural labourers	0	0	0
Marginal workers: Household industry workers	0	0	0
Marginal workers: Others	7	7	0
Non-workers	352	115	237
