= Ovali, Bhiwandi =

Village in Maharashtra

Ovali
- village
- Location in Maharashtra, India Ovali (India)
- Coordinates: 19.25848387°N 73.0562067°E
- Country: India
- State: Maharashtra
- District: Thane
- Taluka: Bhiwandi
- Elevation: 23 m (75 ft)

Population (2011)
  - Total: 1,566
- Time zone: UTC+5:30 (IST)
- 2011 census code: 552662

Ovali is a village in the Thane district of Maharashtra, India. It is located in the Bhiwandi taluka.

== Demographics ==
According to the 2011 census of India, Ovali has 327 households. The effective literacy rate (i.e. the literacy rate of population excluding children aged 6 and below) is 82.68%.

Demographics (2011 Census)
	Total	Male	Female
Population	1566	847	719
Children aged below 6 years	232	135	97
Scheduled caste	6	4	2
Scheduled tribe	151	80	71
Literates	1103	637	466
Workers (all)	565	474	91
Main workers (total)	474	416	58
Main workers: Cultivators	58	54	4
Main workers: Agricultural labourers	4	4	0
Main workers: Household industry workers	8	8	0
Main workers: Other	404	350	54
Marginal workers (total)	91	58	33
Marginal workers: Cultivators	16	11	5
Marginal workers: Agricultural labourers	2	1	1
Marginal workers: Household industry workers	1	1	0
Marginal workers: Others	72	45	27
Non-workers	1001	373	628
