= Pimpalghar =

Village in Maharashtra

- village
- Location in Maharashtra, India Pimpalghar (India)
- Coordinates: 19.25921311°N 73.09345722°E
- Country: India
- State: Maharashtra
- District: Thane
- Taluka: Bhiwandi
- Elevation: 12 m (39 ft)

Population (2011)
  - Total: 1,736
- Time zone: UTC+5:30 (IST)
- 2011 census code: 552658

Pimpalghar is a village in the Thane district of Maharashtra, India. It is located in the Bhiwandi taluka.

== Demographics ==
According to the 2011 census of India, Pimpalghar has 446 households. The effective literacy rate (i.e. the literacy rate of population excluding children aged 6 and below) is 91.01%.

Demographics (2011 Census)
| | Total | Male | Female |
|---|---|---|---|
| Population | 1736 | 1076 | 660 |
| Children aged below 6 years | 223 | 138 | 85 |
| Scheduled caste | 18 | 13 | 5 |
| Scheduled tribe | 2 | 1 | 1 |
| Literates | 1377 | 901 | 476 |
| Workers (all) | 1014 | 758 | 256 |
| Main workers (total) | 889 | 742 | 147 |
| Main workers: Cultivators | 78 | 68 | 10 |
| Main workers: Agricultural labourers | 18 | 12 | 6 |
| Main workers: Household industry workers | 45 | 31 | 14 |
| Main workers: Other | 748 | 631 | 117 |
| Marginal workers (total) | 125 | 16 | 109 |
| Marginal workers: Cultivators | 3 | 0 | 3 |
| Marginal workers: Agricultural labourers | 0 | 0 | 0 |
| Marginal workers: Household industry workers | 3 | 0 | 3 |
| Marginal workers: Others | 119 | 16 | 103 |
| Non-workers | 722 | 318 | 404 |
