= Kalambholi =

Village in Maharashtra

- village
- Location in Maharashtra, India Kalambholi (India)
- Coordinates: 19.6638038°N 73.2197691°E
- Country: India
- State: Maharashtra
- District: Thane
- Taluka: Bhiwandi
- Elevation: 68 m (223 ft)

Population (2011)
  - Total: 430
- Time zone: UTC+5:30 (IST)
- 2011 census code: 552619

Kalambholi is a village in the Thane district of Maharashtra, India. It is located in the Bhiwandi taluka.

== Demographics ==
According to the 2011 census of India, Kalambholi has 92 households. The effective literacy rate (i.e. the literacy rate of population excluding children aged 6 and below) is 79.37%.

Demographics (2011 Census)
	Total	Male	Female
Population	430	214	216
Children aged below 6 years	47	20	27
Scheduled caste	0	0	0
Scheduled tribe	67	34	33
Literates	304	167	137
Workers (all)	151	114	37
Main workers (total)	150	113	37
Main workers: Cultivators	58	49	9
Main workers: Agricultural labourers	64	39	25
Main workers: Household industry workers	0	0	0
Main workers: Other	28	25	3
Marginal workers (total)	1	1	0
Marginal workers: Cultivators	1	1	0
Marginal workers: Agricultural labourers	0	0	0
Marginal workers: Household industry workers	0	0	0
Marginal workers: Others	0	0	0
Non-workers	279	100	179
