= Prabalgad =

Fort in India

- Part of maharastra
- Raigad District, Maharashtra
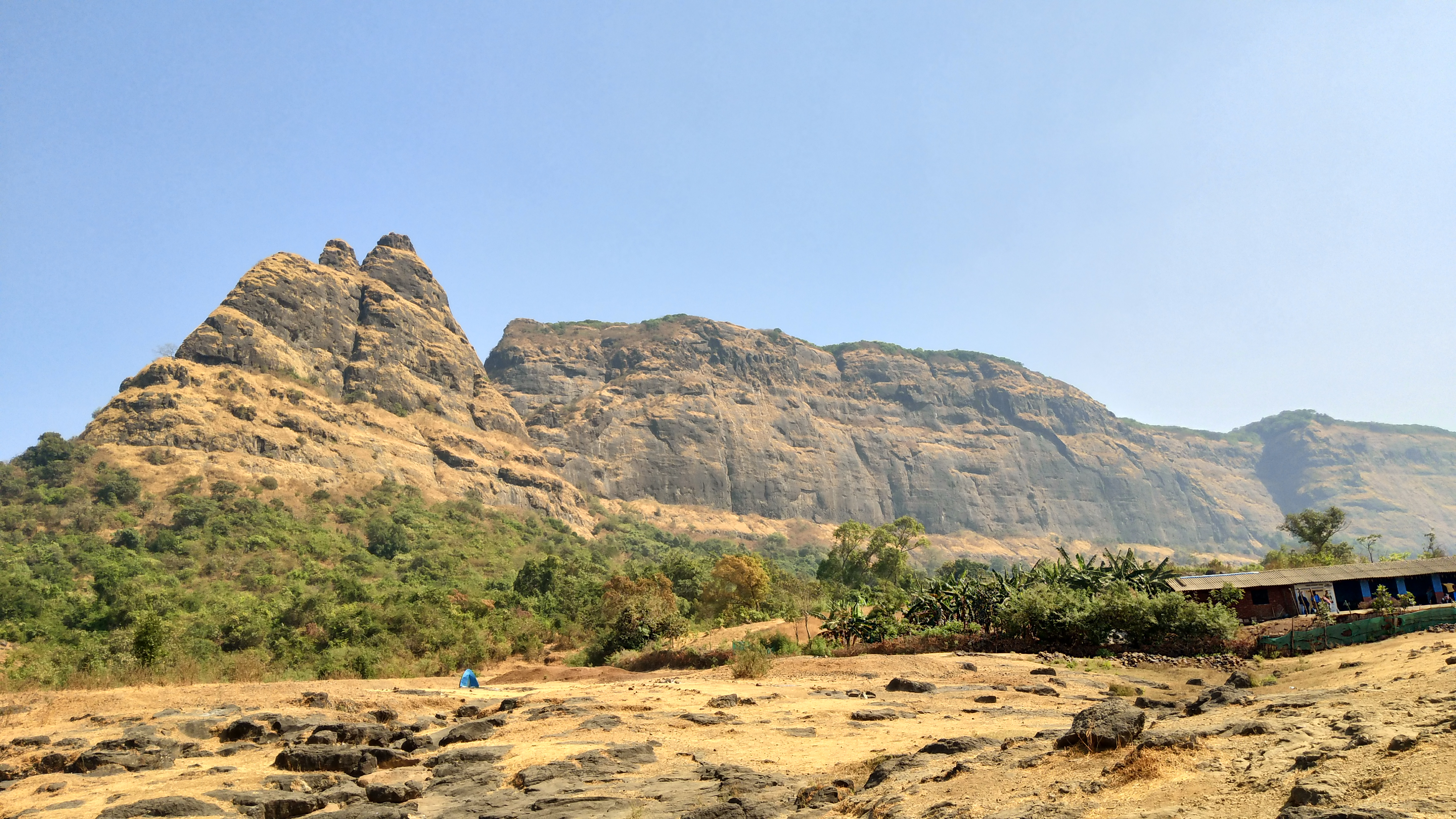
- Kalavantin Durg and Prabalgad

Site information
- Type: Hill fort
- Owner: Government of India
- Controlled by: Maratha Empire (1657); Government of India (1947-)

Location
- Shown within Maharashtra Prabalgad (India)
- Coordinates: 18°58′24″N 73°13′27″E

Prabalgad (also known as Muranjan, Pradhangad or Prabalmachi) is a fort located between Matheran and Panvel and comes under the Raigad District in the state of Maharashtra, India.

The Prabalgad Fort stands at an elevation of 2,300 feet (700 m) in the Western Ghats. The fort was previously known as Muranjan until it was taken over and renamed by the Maratha forces under Chatrapati Shivaji Maharaj's rule. Its sister fort is Irshalgad. Right next to Prabalgad, to its north, lies the steep Kalavantin pinnacle.

== History ==
The Prabalgad Fort was built by the Bahmani Sultanate to keep an eye on the Panvel Fort and the Kalyan Fort in the North Konkan area. Around 1458 A.D, "Malik Ahmad" the prime minister of the kingdom of Ahmednagar, took over the fort during his conquest of Konkan. After disintegration of the Bahmani Sultanate, the fort remained with the Ahmadnagar Sultanate.

During the collapse of the Ahmadnagar Sultanate, Shahaji led a helping hand against the separate forces of the Mughal Empire and the Adil Shahi dynasty. After the collapse of the Sultanate, he moved to Muranjan along with his wife Jijabai and son Shivaji for a brief period of time.

However, following Shahaji's defeat and the agreement of Mahuli, North Konkan along with the fort, was ceded to Mughals who granted ruling authority of the area to Adilshah of Bijapur. Shivaji conquered the fort from the Mughals in 1657 A.D, after which he established himself in the Kalyan-Bhivandi area.

During the attack by Shivaji, the fort was governed by "Kesar Singh", a Mughal sardar, and was the only fort to put up a strong resistance. Singh died during the battle in October 1657. Kesar Singh's mother hid herself and her grandchild during the attack. Shivaji, in an act of kindness made sure the lady and the child were allowed a safe passage out.

In the year 1826, Umaji Naik, a freedom fighter and his associates were believed to have made the fort as their home for a brief period of time.

== Geography ==
Prabalgad lies on the Prabal plateau between Matheran and Panvel and can be easily spotted from the Mumbai-Pune expressway. The Ulhas River runs to the east of the fort while the "Gadhi River" runs to the west. The Patalganga River is to the south.

The forts of Chanderi and Peb are to the west. The Manikgad Fort is to the south while the Karnala fort is located towards the north.

Kalavantin Durg is a 685m high pinnacle on the northern edge of the Prabal plateau. It is located near the Machi and near the Vajepur village.

=== Climate ===
Prabalgad has a tropical monsoon climate (Am) with little to no rainfall from November to May and extremely heavy rainfall from June to September with moderately heavy showers in October.

Climate data for Prabalgad
Month	Jan	Feb	Mar	Apr	May	Jun	Jul	Aug	Sep	Oct	Nov	Dec	Year
Mean daily maximum °C (°F)	27.9 (82.2)	28.9 (84.0)	31.2 (88.2)	32.8 (91.0)	32.9 (91.2)	30.0 (86.0)	27.1 (80.8)	26.9 (80.4)	27.7 (81.9)	30.2 (86.4)	29.8 (85.6)	28.8 (83.8)	29.5 (85.1)
Daily mean °C (°F)	21.5 (70.7)	22.3 (72.1)	25.0 (77.0)	27.3 (81.1)	28.3 (82.9)	26.7 (80.1)	24.8 (76.6)	24.4 (75.9)	24.6 (76.3)	25.5 (77.9)	23.9 (75.0)	22.3 (72.1)	24.7 (76.5)
Mean daily minimum °C (°F)	15.1 (59.2)	15.8 (60.4)	18.9 (66.0)	21.8 (71.2)	23.7 (74.7)	23.4 (74.1)	22.5 (72.5)	22.0 (71.6)	21.6 (70.9)	20.9 (69.6)	18.1 (64.6)	15.8 (60.4)	20.0 (67.9)
Average precipitation mm (inches)	0 (0)	0 (0)	0 (0)	5 (0.2)	23 (0.9)	694 (27.3)	1,983 (78.1)	1,357 (53.4)	584 (23.0)	119 (4.7)	14 (0.6)	3 (0.1)	4,782 (188.3)
