= Sor, Bhiwandi =

Village in Maharashtra

Sor
- village
- Location in Maharashtra, India Sor (India)
- Coordinates: 19.3559308°N 73.2046534°E
- Country: India
- State: Maharashtra
- District: Thane
- Taluka: Bhiwandi
- Elevation: 22 m (72 ft)

Population (2011)
  - Total: 793
- Time zone: UTC+5:30 (IST)
- 2011 census code: 552620

Sor is a village in the Thane district of Maharashtra, India. It is located in the Bhiwandi taluka.

== Demographics ==
According to the 2011 census of India, Sor has 146 households. The effective literacy rate (i.e. the literacy rate of population excluding children aged 6 and below) is 84.2%.

Demographics (2011 Census)
	Total	Male	Female
Population	793	420	373
Children aged below 6 years	97	47	50
Scheduled caste	7	4	3
Scheduled tribe	379	192	187
Literates	586	344	242
Workers (all)	177	160	17
Main workers (total)	142	129	13
Main workers: Cultivators	101	96	5
Main workers: Agricultural labourers	12	9	3
Main workers: Household industry workers	2	2	0
Main workers: Other	27	22	5
Marginal workers (total)	35	31	4
Marginal workers: Cultivators	4	4	0
Marginal workers: Agricultural labourers	12	9	3
Marginal workers: Household industry workers	1	1	0
Marginal workers: Others	18	17	1
Non-workers	616	260	356
