= Yewai =

Village in Maharashtra

- village
- Location in Maharashtra, India Yewai (India)
- Coordinates: 19.3211351°N 73.1069298°E
- Country: India
- State: Maharashtra
- District: Thane
- Taluka: Bhiwandi
- Elevation: 27 m (89 ft)

Population (2011)
  - Total: 673
- Time zone: UTC+5:30 (IST)
- 2011 census code: 552642

Yewai is a village in the Thane district of Maharashtra, India. It is located in the Bhiwandi taluka.

== Demographics ==
According to the 2011 census of India, Yewai has 135 households. The effective literacy rate (i.e. the literacy rate of population excluding children aged 6 and below) is 75.13%.

Demographics (2011 Census)
	Total	Male	Female
Population	673	352	321
Children aged below 6 years	102	61	41
Scheduled caste	32	14	18
Scheduled tribe	324	158	166
Literates	429	234	195
Workers (all)	203	173	30
Main workers (total)	194	169	25
Main workers: Cultivators	22	16	6
Main workers: Agricultural labourers	44	30	14
Main workers: Household industry workers	0	0	0
Main workers: Other	128	123	5
Marginal workers (total)	9	4	5
Marginal workers: Cultivators	2	2	0
Marginal workers: Agricultural labourers	3	0	3
Marginal workers: Household industry workers	0	0	0
Marginal workers: Others	4	2	2
Non-workers	470	179	291
