= Gundavali =

Village in Maharashtra

- village
- Location in Maharashtra, India Gundavali (India)
- Coordinates: 19.2463238°N 73.0343934°E
- Country: India
- State: Maharashtra
- District: Thane
- Taluka: Bhiwandi
- Elevation: 10 m (33 ft)

Population (2011)
  - Total: 2,926
- Time zone: UTC+5:30 (IST)
- 2011 census code: 552665

Gundavali is a village in the Thane district of Maharashtra, India. It is located in the Bhiwandi taluka.

== Demographics ==
According to the 2011 census of India, Gundavali has 658 households. The effective literacy rate (i.e. the literacy rate of population excluding children aged 6 and below) is 84.72%.

Demographics (2011 Census)
	Total	Male	Female
Population	2926	1724	1202
Children aged below 6 years	374	198	176
Scheduled caste	66	49	17
Scheduled tribe	16	9	7
Literates	2162	1385	777
Workers (all)	1223	1133	90
Main workers (total)	1138	1060	78
Main workers: Cultivators	31	28	3
Main workers: Agricultural labourers	5	5	0
Main workers: Household industry workers	28	14	14
Main workers: Other	1074	1013	61
Marginal workers (total)	85	73	12
Marginal workers: Cultivators	4	3	1
Marginal workers: Agricultural labourers	0	0	0
Marginal workers: Household industry workers	7	1	6
Marginal workers: Others	74	69	5
Non-workers	1703	591	1112
