= Irshalgad =

Fortress in India

Coordinates: 18.933568°N 73.232031°E

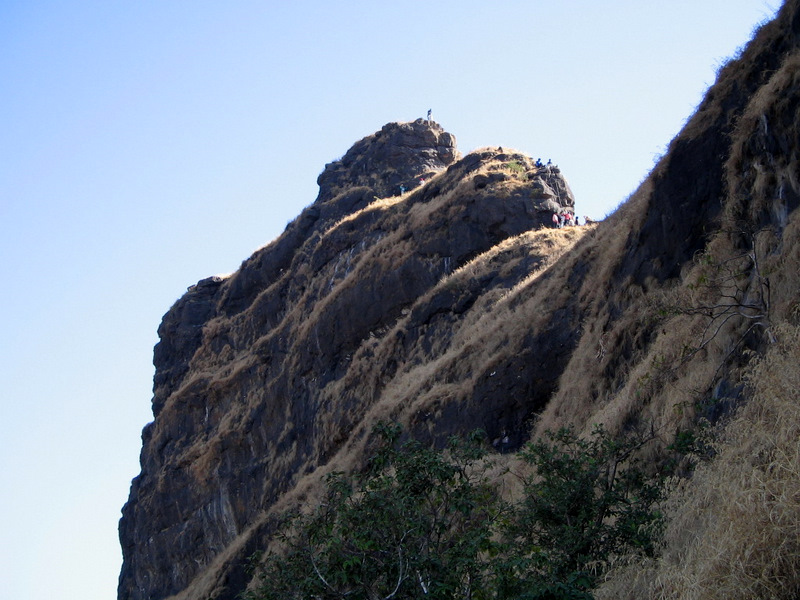
Irshalgad pinnacle

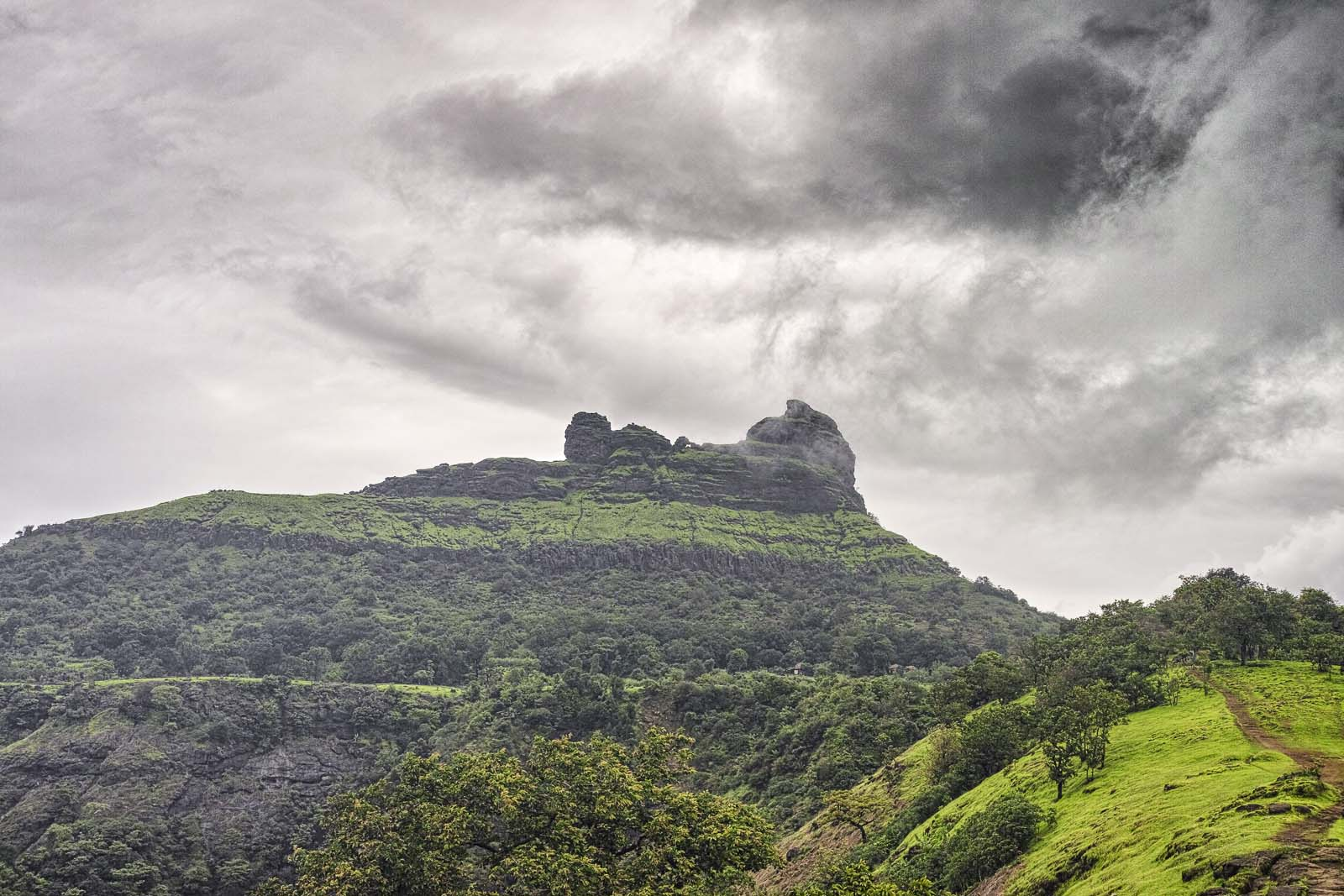
Irshalgad plateau and pinnacle as seen on a monsoon day from just before Irshalwadi village

Irshalgad is a fortress located between Matheran and Panvel in Maharashtra, India. It is a sister fort to Prabalgad. The area of the fort is not large but there are several water cisterns cut from the rock. The nearest village is Irshalwadi.

== Trekking to Irshalgad ==
Irshalgad is 6.5 km out and back trek located near Chauk railway station. Irshalgad pinnacle is an easy to moderate difficulty which takes 2 hour to ascend and 1.5 hour to descend. The road head, if travelling by your own vehicle is Nanivali village near Chowk town. Chowk town lies on NH4 that connects Panvel with Karjat. Chowk also has a train station (Station code CHOK). (Pune - Bhusaval express) stops at Chowk train station. From Chowk, Nanivali village (the starting point of this trek) is a comfortable 2.3 kilometres walk. From Nanivali village you follow a wide well defined path till Irshalwadi village. The path climbs a steep ridge and then tapers to an easy ascend till Irshalwadi. From Irshalwadi village head towards a temple dedicated to a local deity and access the Irshalgad plateau via a west–east axis. The trek is child friendly till the pinnacle base. Nevertheless, there have been numerous fatalities while climbing the pinnacle.
