= Kalavantin Durg =

Pinnacle in Maharashtra, India

Kalavantindurg
- कलावंतीन
- Part of Maharashtra
- Raigad District, Maharashtra
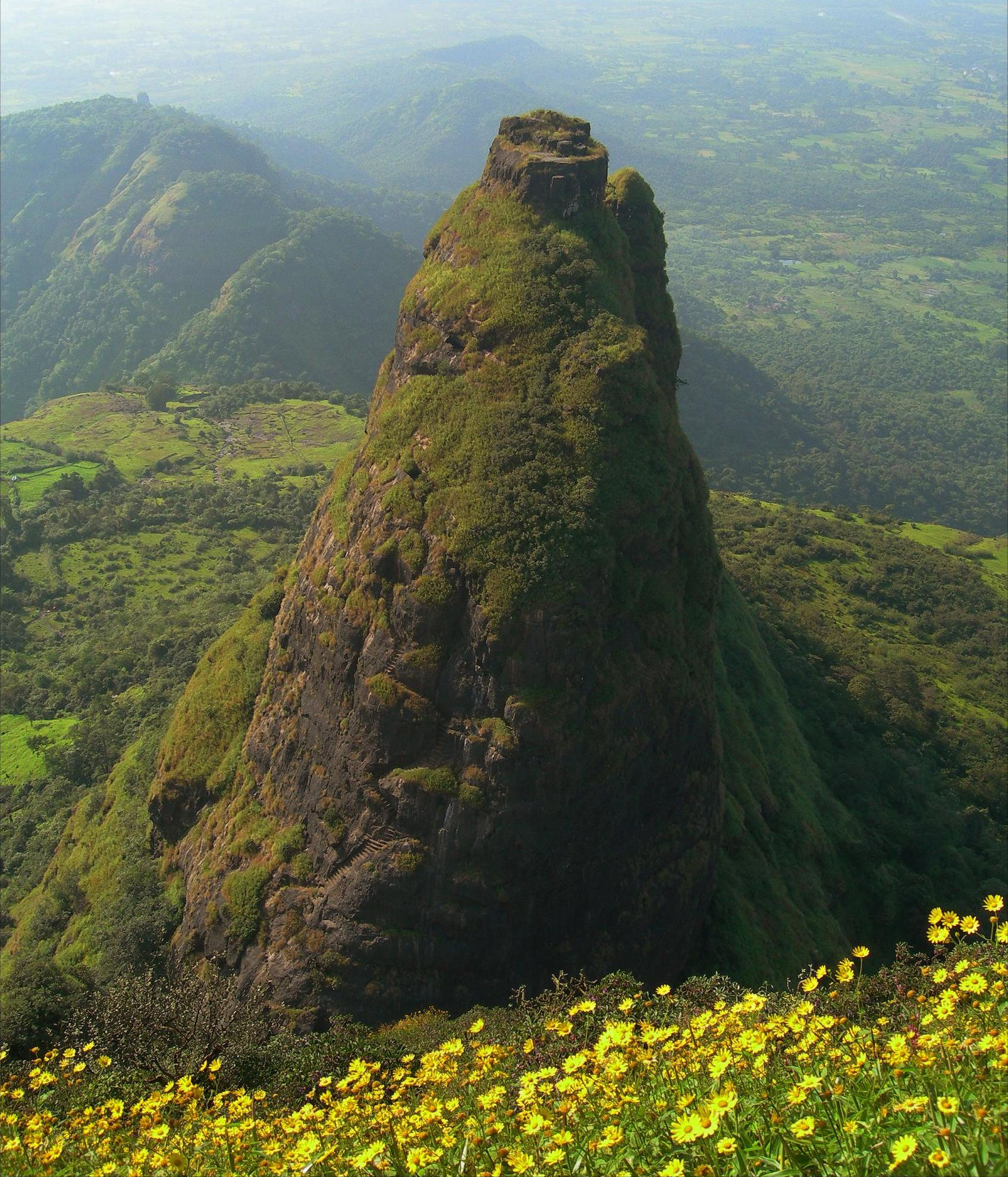
- Kalavantin Durg

Site information
- Type: Hill fort
- Owner: Government of India
- Controlled by: Maratha Empire (1657); Government of India (1947-)

Location
- Shown within Maharashtra Kalavantindurg (India)
- Coordinates: 18°58′58″N 73°13′12″E
- Height: 686 M(2250 Ft)

Kalavantin Durg is a 2,250 ft (686 m) high summit located in the Western Ghats, near the Prabalgad fort in the Raigad district of Maharashtra, India. It is also known as Kelve Teen, Kalavantinicha Sulka, or Kalavantin Pinnacle; alternative transliterations include Kalawantin, Kalavati, and Kalavanti. It is a popular trekking destination.

== History ==
There is a series of steps leading to the top of the pinnacle, but little is known about the history of the structure. According to local guides, it was built for a queen called Kalavantin in the 15th century, around the same time as the neighboring Prabalgad.

In Marathi language the word "Durg" means fort. Although it is called "Kalavantin Durg", there is no fort. Kalavantin is a pinnacle which was used by the ruler to have watch on surrounding area.

Rock-cut steps of the Kalavantin Durg

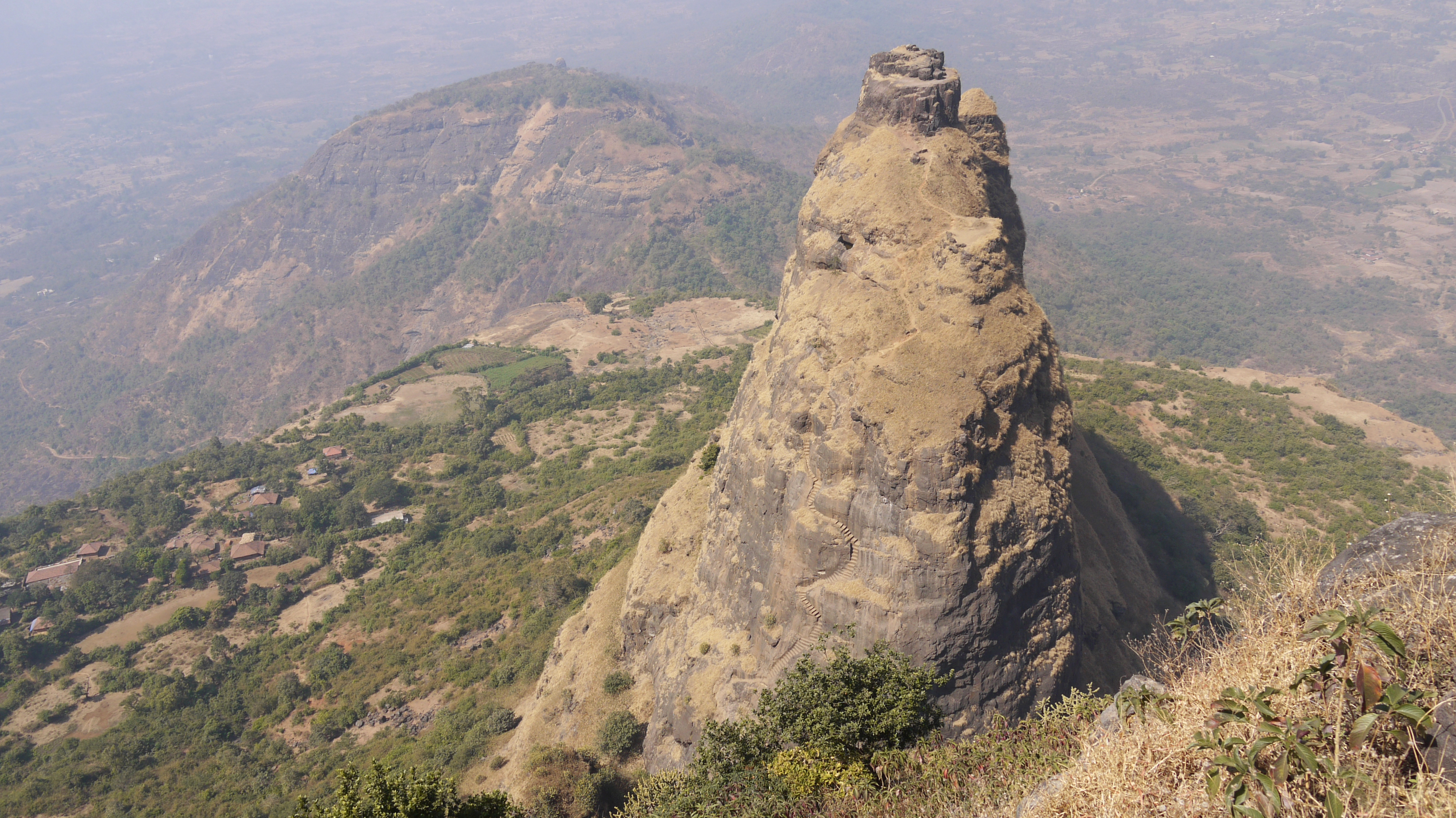

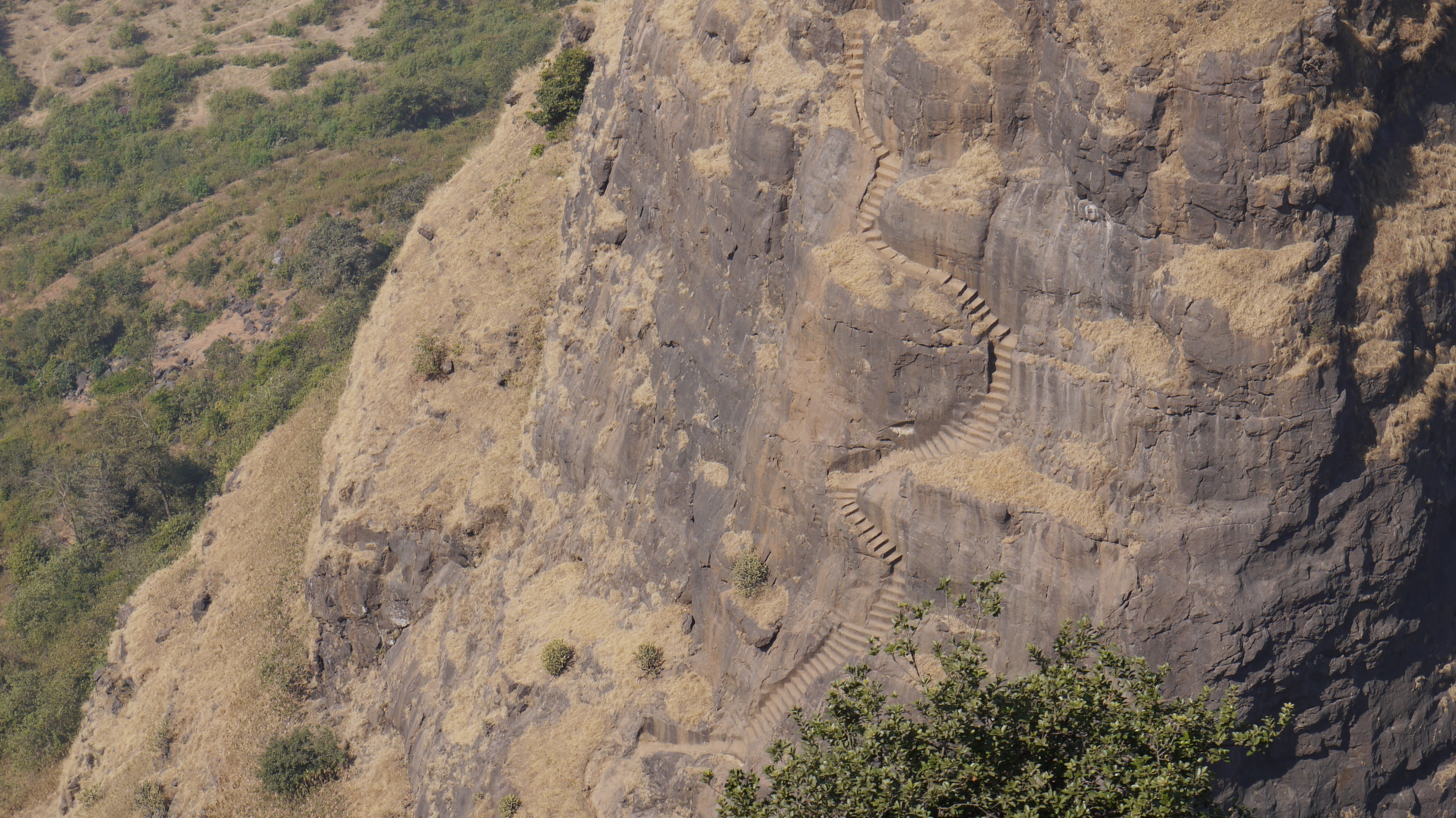

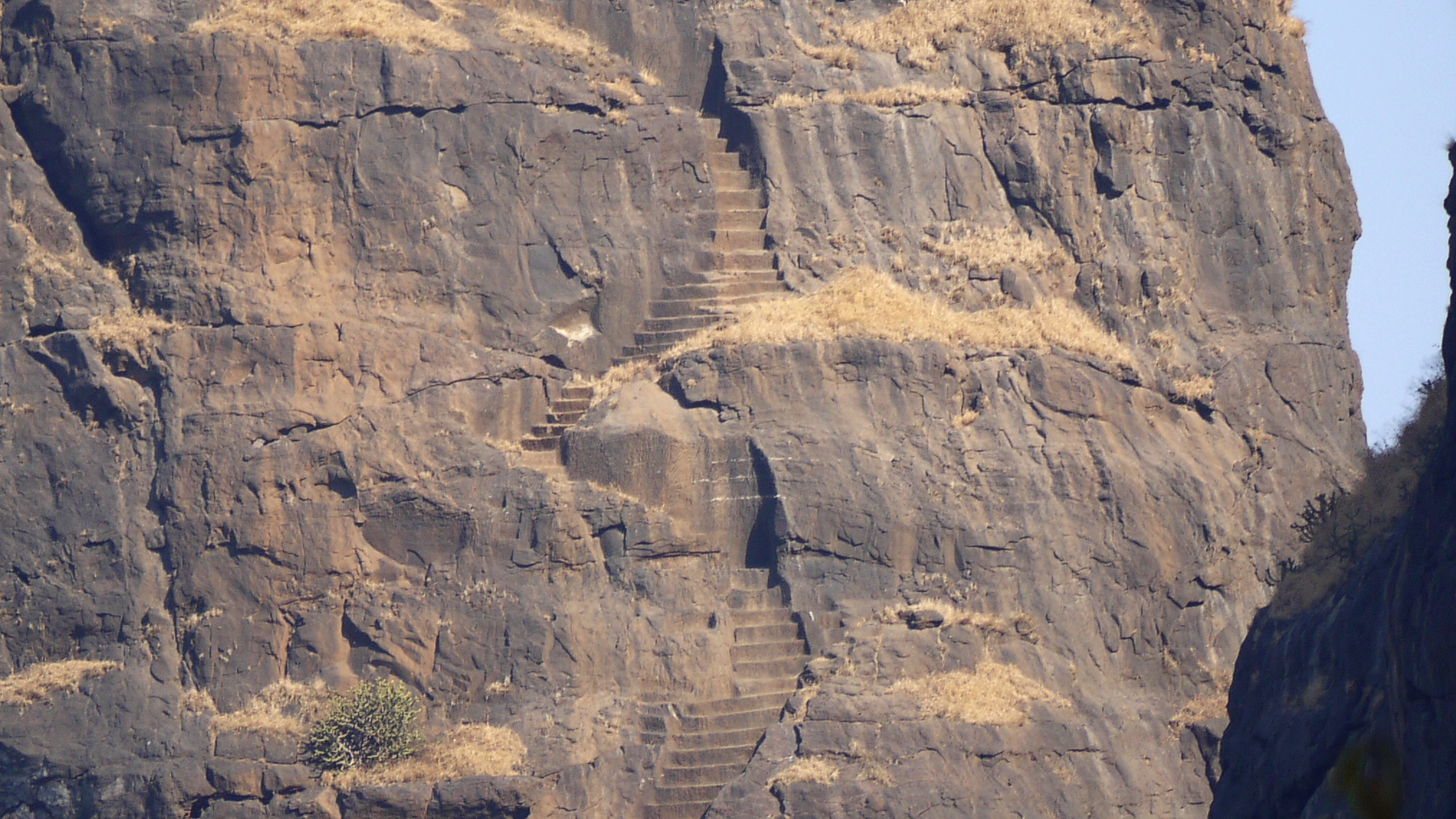

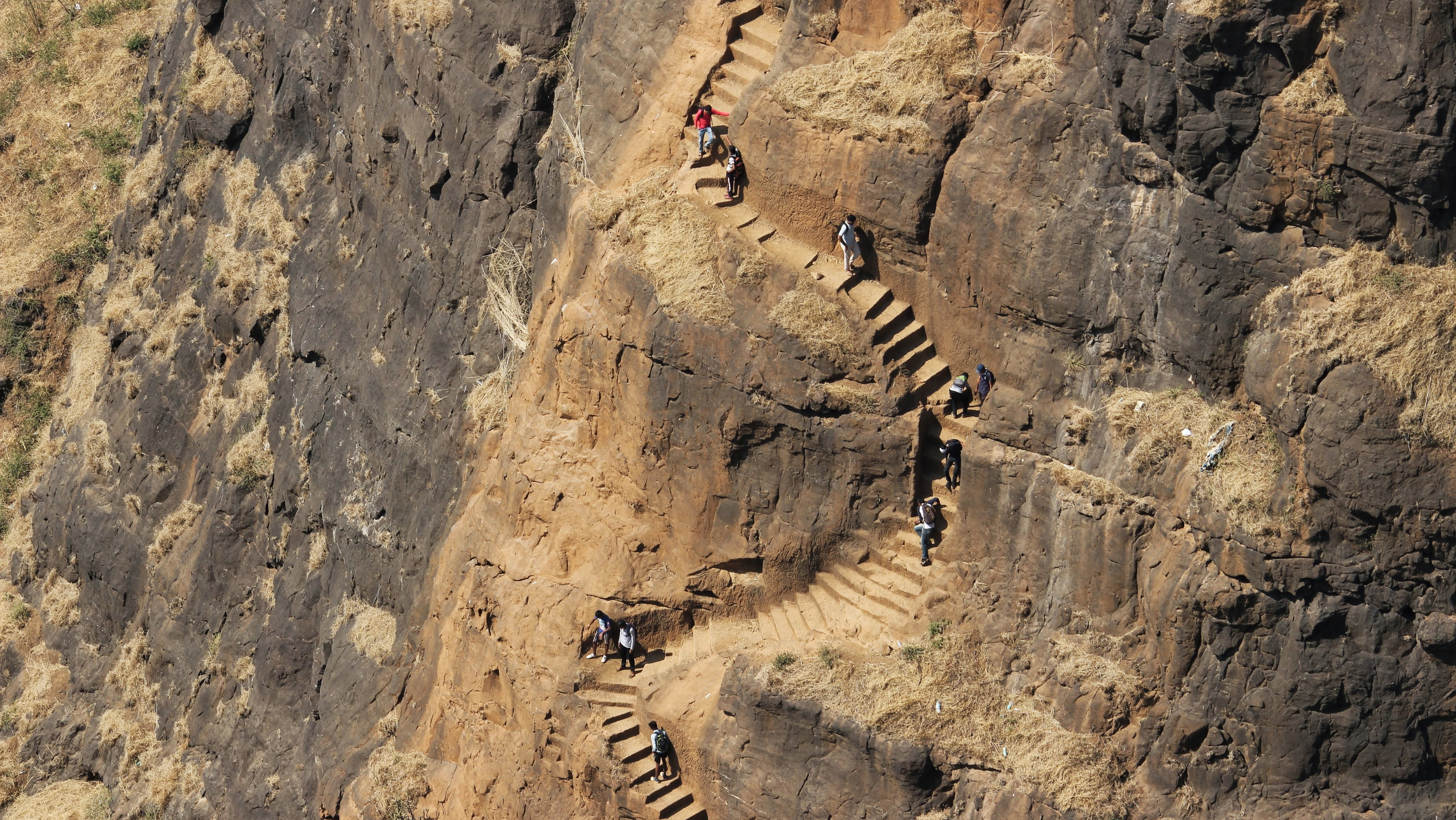

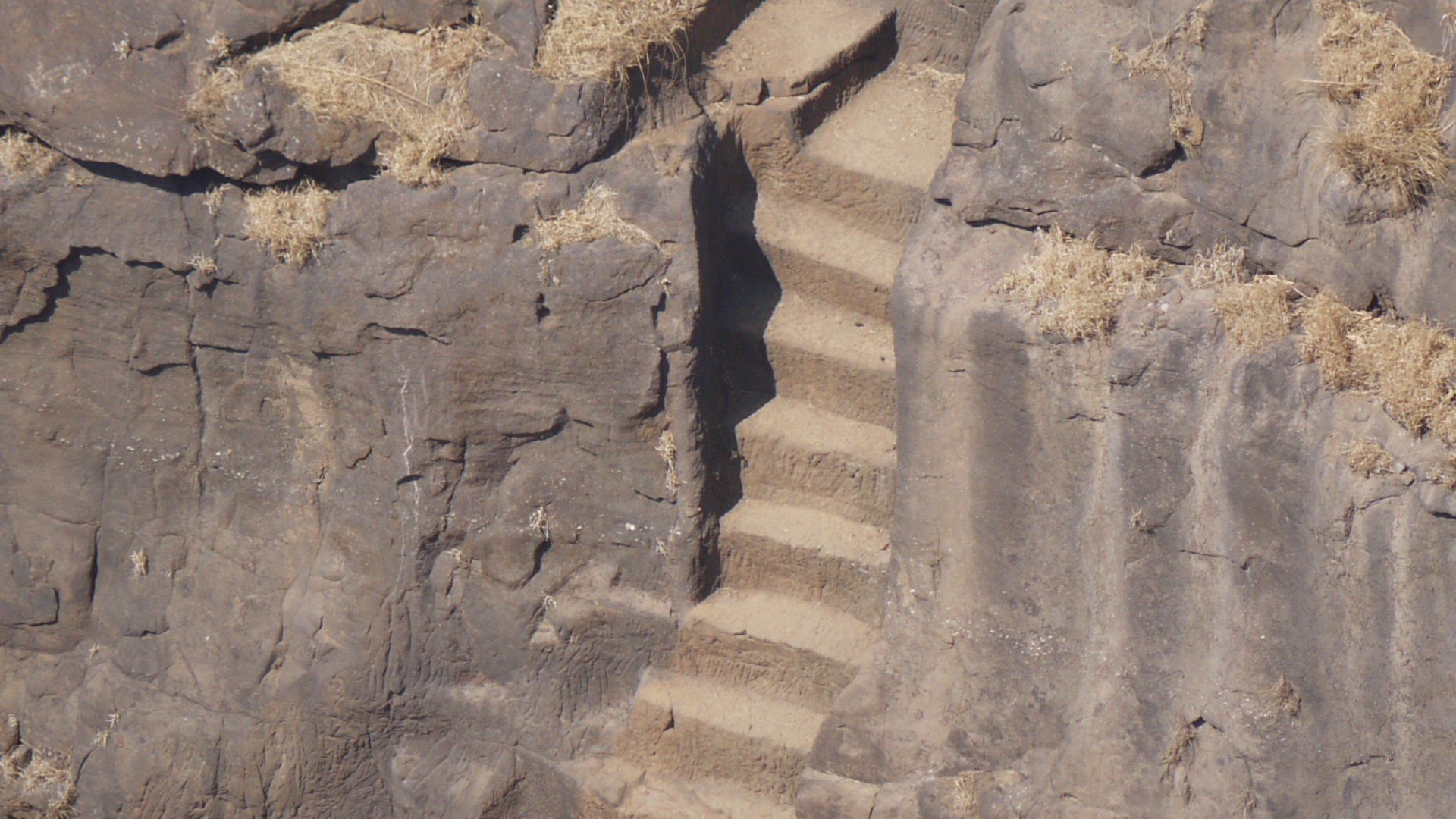

== Trekking ==
The trek to the top of the Kalavantin Durg is considered one of the most challenging ones in the Western Ghats. The summit is accessible via a 3 km (2 mile) hike from the Thakurwadi village in Panvel taluka. After Prabalmachi village (2 km; 1¼ miles from Thakurvadi), the hike route diverges into two paths: the shorter one towards Kalavantin Durg, and the longer one towards Prabalgad fort. The route to the Kalavantin top is a roughly 60-degree incline, and involves climbing rock-cut steps that are as high as 2 feet.

=== Accidental deaths of trekkers ===
In December 2016, 27-year old Hyderabad-based trekker Rachita Gupta Kanodia died during a trek to Kalavantin Durg and Prabalgad. Her body was found around 10 days after her death. She had earlier climbed the Kalavantin Durg in September, and is suspected to have fallen off from the Prabalgad peak.

In February 2018, 27-year old Pune-based trekker Chetan Dhande fell to his death while 15 feet away from the top of the Kalavantin Durg. Several other climbers witnessed his fall, and his body was discovered nearly four hours later.

After Dhande's death, the local administration instituted new rules to ensure safety of the trekkers. According to the new rules, each trekker had to register with the administration by paying an entry fee of ₹ 20, and providing their personal details. No entry was allowed in the area during dark hours of 5pm-6am. During other hours, the entry was allowed only when accompanied by a local guide, which would cost ₹ 50. The administration trained 50 local villagers as guides. The trekkers were also banned from using plastic bags or plastic bottles.
