= Bhiwandi-Nizampur City Municipal Corporation =

Local civic body in Bhiwandi-Nizampur, Maharashtra, India

Coordinates: 19.298969°N 73.064129°E

Bhiwandi-Nizampur City Municipal Corporation (BNCMC)

Type
- Type: Municipal Corporation of the Bhiwandi

History
- Founded: 2002

Leadership
- Mayor: Narayan Chaudhry, IND
- Municipal Commissioner: Anmol Sagar IAS
- Deputy Mayor: Tarique Momin, INC

Structure
- Seats: 90
- Political groups: Government (48): INC (30); NCP-SP (12); Opposition (42): BJP (22); SHS (12); SP (6) (Suspended Group); KVA (4); BVA(EM) (3); IND (1)

Elections
- Last election: 15 January 2026
- Next election: 2031

Website
- Visit Website

The Bhiwandi-Nizampur City Municipal Corporation (BNCMC) is a civic body formed after dissolution of "BNCMC" (Bhiwandi-Nizampur City Municipal Council) into a Corporation by an act of Government Of Maharashtra in 2002 to administer the industrial township of Bhiwandi, which is a city in Thane district in the Indian state of Maharashtra. Municipal Corporation mechanism in India was introduced during British Rule with formation of municipal corporation in Madras (Chennai) in 1688, later followed by municipal corporations in Bombay (Mumbai) and Calcutta (Kolkata) by 1762. Bhiwandi-Nizampur Municipal Corporation is headed by Mayor of city and governed by Commissioner. Bhiwandi-Nizampur Municipal Corporation has been formed with functions to improve the infrastructure of town.

The combined population of Bhiwandi-Nizampur and Bhiwandi was 709,665 at the 2011 census.

== Revenue sources ==
The following are the Income sources for the corporation from the Central and State Government.

=== Revenue from taxes ===
Following is the Tax related revenue for the corporation.

- Property tax.
- Profession tax.
- Entertainment tax.
- Grants from Central and State Government like Goods and Services Tax.
- Advertisement tax.

=== Revenue from non-tax sources ===
Following is the Non Tax related revenue for the corporation.

- Water usage charges.
- Fees from Documentation services.
- Rent received from municipal property.
- Funds from municipal bonds.

== Election results ==
=== 2026 results ===
Party	Seats	±
Indian National Congress (INC)	30	▼17
Bharatiya Janata Party (BJP)	22	▲3
Shiv Sena (SHS)	12	Steady
NCP (SP) (NCP-SP)	12	New
Samajwadi Party (SP)	6	▲4
Konark Vikas Aghadi (KVA)	4	▲0
Bhiwandi Vikas Aghadi Ekta Manch (BVA)	3	New
Others	1	▼1
Total	90	

=== 2017 results ===
Party	Seats	±
Indian National Congress (INC)	47	▲21
Bharatiya Janata Party (BJP)	19	▲6
Shiv Sena (SHS)	12	▼4
Konark Vikas Aghadi (KVA)	4	▲
RPI (EV)	4	
Samajwadi Party (SP)	2	▼10
Others	2	▼11
Total	90	
Source :

=== 2012 results ===
Party	Seats
Indian National Congress (INC)	26
Shiv Sena (SHS)	16
Samajwadi Party (SP)	16
Bharatiya Janata Party (BJP)	8
Nationalist Congress Party (NCP)	9
Other regd. parties	8
Independents	7
Total	90
Source :

== Taxes ==
=== Octroi ===
With the introduction of LBT, Octroi was abolished from 21 May 2013.

=== Local Body Tax ===
Local Body Tax (LBT) was introduced from 22 May 2013 in the Municipal corporation of Bhiwandi.
