= Bhatsa Dam =

Bhatsa Dam भातसा धरण
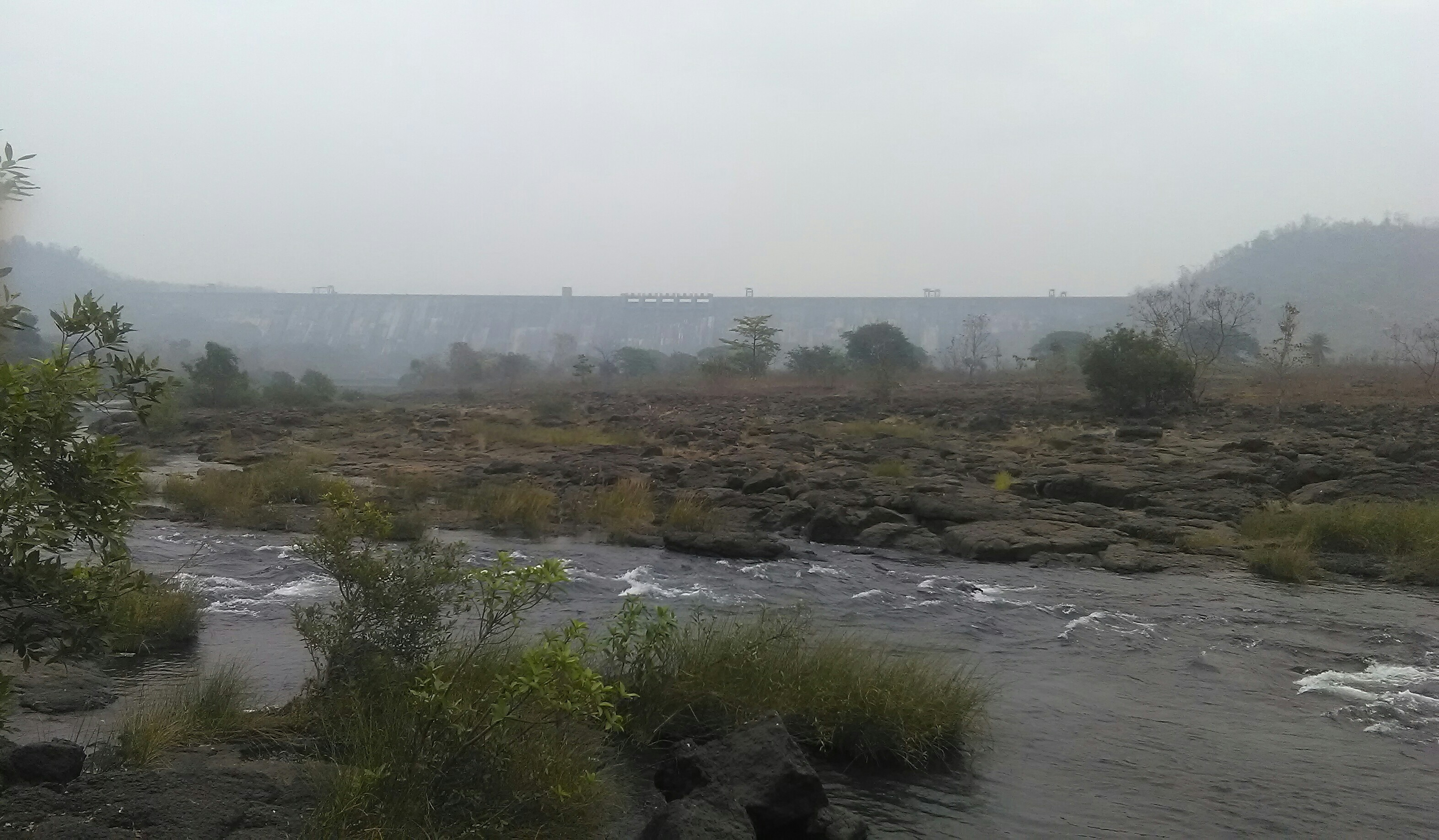
- Bhatsa Dam in Monsoon

- Location within Maharashtra
- Official name: Bhatsa Dam
- Location: Shahapur, Thane District of Maharashtra, India
- Coordinates: 19.5130765°N 73.4173715°E
- Opening date: 1983
- Owners: Government of Maharashtra, India

Dam and spillways
- Type of dam: Earthfill; Gravity
- Impounds: Bhatsa River
- Height: 88.5 m (290 ft)
- Length: 959 m (3,146 ft)
- Dam volume: 18.25 km^{3} (4.38 cu mi)

Reservoir
- Total capacity: 0.942115 km^{3} (0.226025 cu mi)
- Surface area: 2.725 km^{2} (1.052 sq mi)

Bhatsa Dam, is an earthfill and gravity dam on Bhatsa river near Shahapur, Thane district in state of Maharashtra in India.

== Specifications ==
The height of the dam above lowest foundation is 88.5 m (290 ft) while the length is 959 m (3,146 ft). The volume content is 18.25 km^{3} (4.38 cu mi) and gross storage capacity is .97615 km^{3} (0.23419 cu mi).

Bhatsa Dam with open gates due to overflow of water

== Purpose ==
- Irrigation – Bhatsa dam has a right-bank canal and a left-bank canal for irrigation. However, only the right-bank canal is functional and flows through Bhiwandi Taluka.
- Water supply – Bhatsa dam is a major source of water for Municipal Corporation of Greater Mumbai and Thane Municipal Corporation. The water for both the municipal corporations is pumped from Pise Dam which is 50 km away from Bhatsa dam on Bhatsa river. Water for Khardi and 5 nearby villages is also pumped from the downstream side of the dam.
- Hydroelectric powerplant – It has a capacity of 15MW.

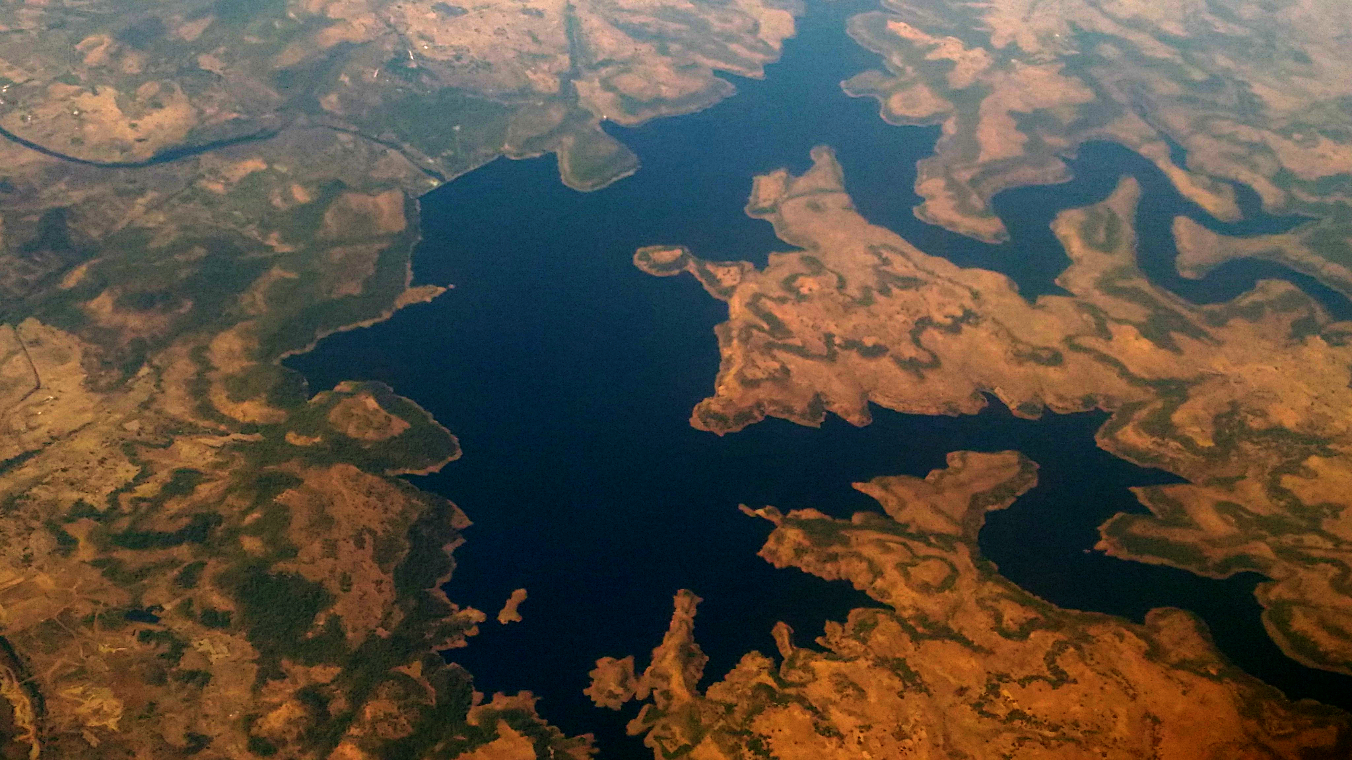
Aerial view of Bhatsa reservoir and dam

== See also ==
- List of dams and reservoirs in Maharashtra
- List of dams and reservoirs in India
