= Bhiwandi =

City in Maharashtra, India

- City; Mumbai Metropolitan City
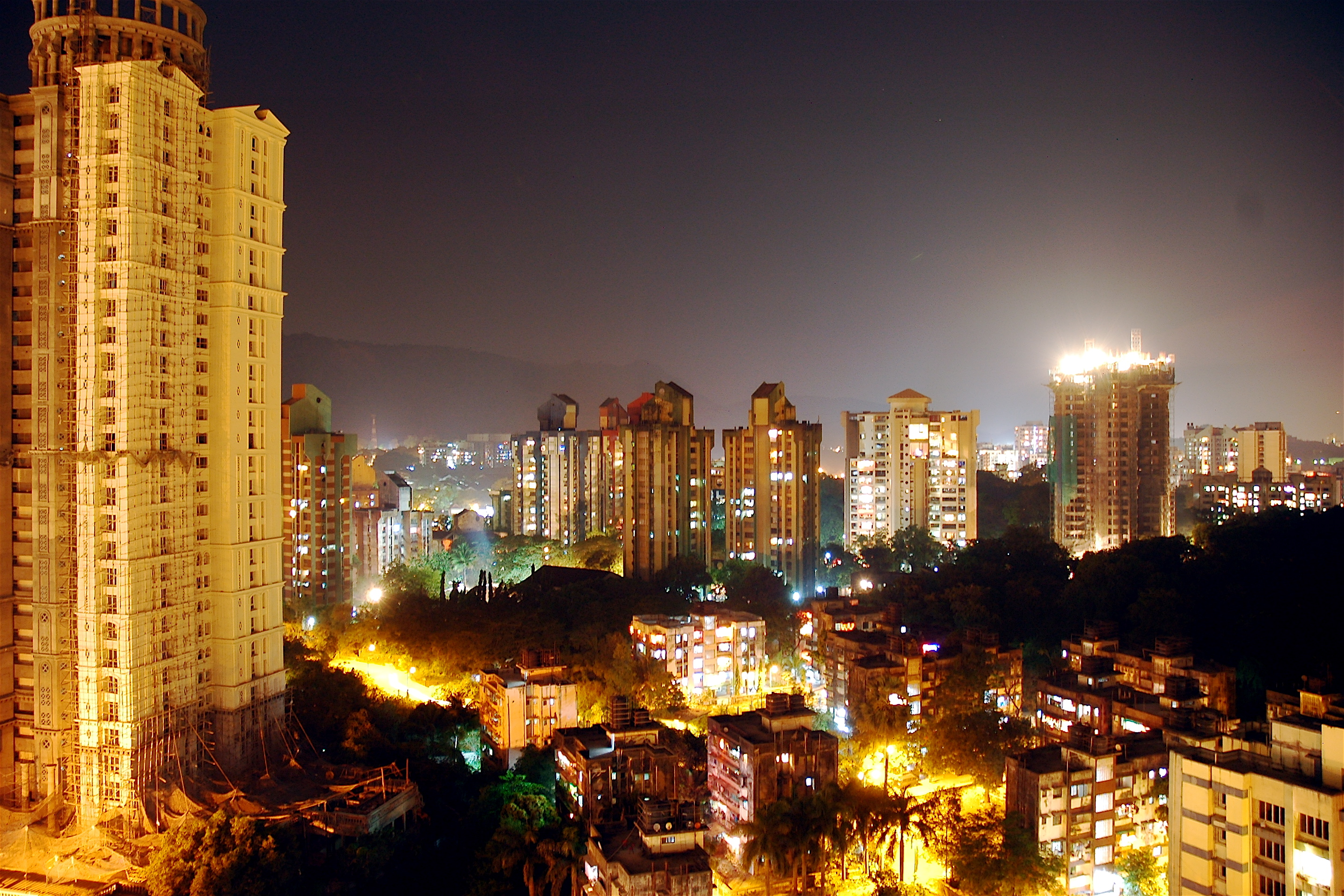
- Bhiwandi night view

- Location within Maharashtra Location within India
- Coordinates: 19.296664°N 73.063121°E
- Country: India
- State: Maharashtra
- District: Thane

Government
  - Type: Municipal Corporation
  - Body: Bhiwandi-Nizampur Municipal Corporation
  - Mayor: Narayan Chaudhary
  - Municipal Commissioner: Anmol Sagar IAS
- Elevation: 24 m (79 ft)

Population (2021)
  - Total: 874,067

Language
  - Official: Marathi
- Time zone: IST
- PIN: 421 302, 421305, 421308
- Telephone code: 02522
- Vehicle registration: MH-04
- Website: www.bncmc.gov.in

Bhiwandi is a city in the Thane district of Maharashtra, India. It is located 20 kilometres (12 mi) northeast of Mumbai, and 15 km (9.3 mi) northeast of the city of Thane. The city is a part of the Mumbai Metropolitan Region.

Bhiwandi is a commercial city and a major trade centre that connects Mumbai and the rest of India through the Mumbai–Agra Highway. It is known for its textile industry, though in recent years, the economic downturn has forced the closure of a large portion of the sector.

Bhiwandi lies in the Konkani coastal lowland, a region known for its hills and streams. The city houses the tehsil headquarters of Bhiwandi, and it is administered by the Bhiwandi-Nizampur City Municipal Corporation.

== Business and employment ==
The city of Bhiwandi has the largest number of power looms and handlooms in the country. The majority of the population is employed in the power loom sector. The second-largest power loom cluster, after the one in Surat, Gujarat, is located in Bhiwandi. Since 2020, the city's textile industry has been in decline, partly caused by the sudden enactment of new goods and services taxes. Another concern facing textile producers is a lack of contact with buyers, leading many to sell primarily to middlemen, mostly from Gujarat, who charge significant markup prices.

Bhiwandi initially developed as an industrial hub for the textile industry, but more recently has hosted other industries and logistics sectors. Bhiwandi is among Asia's biggest warehousing hubs; its godowns are considered Asia's largest. It is a major contributor to the logistic landscape of Mumbai and India due to its close proximity to the Nhava Seva port of Mumbai, India's financial capital. Many e-commerce companies like Delhivery, Amazon, Flipkart, Reliance Industries, Snapdeal, and FedEx have branches in the city. The city is the next developed region for MMRDA, which has developed other regions such as the Bandra–Kurla Complex, Mumbai Metro, Monorail Project, and Eastern Freeway.

Bhiwandi's economy is divided into three sectors: textiles, groceries, and services (supplying, logistics, and food delivery). During the COVID-19 pandemic, small hotels faced significant challenges.

== Infrastructure ==
Bhiwandi has a large water treatment plant at Panjrapur with 455 MLD capacity, making it one of the largest water treatment plants in Asia.

Bhiwandi has a central railway station at Anjur Phata. The station is connected to Central Railway (Kopar) and Western Railway (Vasai) the Mumbai suburban railway network.

Bhiwandi Metro Project (Mumbai Metro line 5) was proposed to be completed in 2025.

== Municipal finance ==
According to financial data published on the CityFinance Portal of the Ministry of Housing and Urban Affairs, the Bhiwandi Municipal Corporation reported total revenue receipts of ₹509 crore (US$61 million) and total expenditure of ₹508 crore (US$61 million) in 2022–23. Tax revenue accounted for about 19.3% of the total revenue, while the corporation received ₹331 crore in grants during the financial year.

== Demographics ==
Religion in Bhiwandi (2011)
Religion	Percent
Islam	56.01%
Hinduism	39.34%
Jainism	2.66%
Buddhism	1.55%
Others	0.43%

Languages of Bhiwandi City (2011)
1. Urdu (50.5%)
2. Hindi (20.1%)
3. Marathi (11.8%)
4. Telugu (6.79%)
5. Gujarati (3.31%)
6. Bhojpuri (2.68%)
7. Rajasthani (2.39%)
8. Others (2.51%)

== Climate ==
Climate data for Bhiwandi
Month	Jan	Feb	Mar	Apr	May	Jun	Jul	Aug	Sep	Oct	Nov	Dec	Year
Record high °C (°F)	36.3 (97.3)	35.3 (95.5)	37.6 (99.7)	39.5 (103.1)	42.8 (109.0)	39.6 (103.3)	33.5 (92.3)	33.2 (91.8)	34.5 (94.1)	37.6 (99.7)	36.7 (98.1)	34.5 (94.1)	42.8 (109.0)
Mean daily maximum °C (°F)	29.2 (84.6)	30.5 (86.9)	32.4 (90.3)	34.2 (93.6)	34.4 (93.9)	31.2 (88.2)	29.1 (84.4)	28.6 (83.5)	29.4 (84.9)	33.3 (91.9)	32.4 (90.3)	31.2 (88.2)	31.3 (88.3)
Mean daily minimum °C (°F)	15.1 (59.2)	16.5 (61.7)	19.5 (67.1)	22.7 (72.9)	25.2 (77.4)	25.1 (77.2)	24.2 (75.6)	23.7 (74.7)	22.8 (73.0)	22.3 (72.1)	19.4 (66.9)	16.3 (61.3)	19.2 (66.6)
Record low °C (°F)	6.7 (44.1)	8.3 (46.9)	16.5 (61.7)	18.6 (65.5)	20.2 (68.4)	21.1 (70.0)	19.6 (67.3)	18.9 (66.0)	19.2 (66.6)	18.6 (65.5)	16.5 (61.7)	12.4 (54.3)	6.7 (44.1)
Average rainfall mm (inches)	3.6 (0.14)	1.0 (0.04)	1.3 (0.05)	2.0 (0.08)	21.3 (0.84)	502.4 (19.78)	1,015.7 (39.99)	584.2 (23.00)	336.3 (13.24)	95.3 (3.75)	12.9 (0.51)	2.0 (0.08)	2,578 (101.5)
Average rainy days	0	0	0	0	1	14	31	24	15	6	1	0	92
Mean monthly sunshine hours	269.4	259.3	272.9	286.4	295.6	143.3	73.2	71.2	157.5	234.5	245.6	254.2	2,563.1
Source: Government of Maharashtra
