= Khaleqabad =

Khaleqabad or Khaliqabad (Persian: خالق اباد) may refer to the following places in Iran:

== Kerman Province ==
- Khaleqabad, Anar, Kerman Province
- Khaleqabad, Bardsir, Kerman Province
- Khaleqabad, Manujan, Kerman Province
- Khaleqabad, Rafsanjan, Kerman Province
- Khaleqabad, Koshkuiyeh, Rafsanjan County, Kerman Province
- Khaleqabad, Ravar, Kerman Province
- Khaleqabad, Rigan, Kerman Province

== South Khorasan Province ==
- Khaleqabad, South Khorasan, a village in Khusf County

== Zanjan Province ==
- Khaleqabad, Zanjan, a village in Khodabandeh County
