= Saknan =

Saknan سکنان
- Village
- Location within Iran
- Coordinates: 27°44′51″N 57°25′35″E
- Country: Iran
- Province: Kerman
- County: Manujan
- Bakhsh: Aseminun
- Rural District: Bajgan

Population (2006)
  - Total: 91
- Time zone: UTC+3:30 (IRST)
  - Summer (DST): UTC+4:30 (IRDT)

Saknan (Persian: سکنان, also Romanized as Saknān; also known as Sagnān) is a village in Bajgan Rural District, Aseminun District, Manujan County, Kerman Province, Iran. At the 2006 census, its population was 91, in 19 families.
