= Kanan, Manujan =

Village in Iran

Coordinates: 27°24′8″N 57°29′31″E

Kanan کنعان
- village
- Interactive map of Kanan
- Country: Iran
- Province: Kerman
- County: Manujan
- Bakhsh: Aseminun
- Rural District: Bajgan

Population (2006)
  - Total: 89
- Time zone: UTC+3:30 (IRST)
  - Summer (DST): UTC+4:30 (IRDT)

Kanan (Persian: کنعان, also Romanized as Kanān) is a village in Bajgan Rural District, Aseminun District, Manujan County, Kerman Province, Iran. At the 2006 census its population was 89 in 21 families.
