= Patak-e Bajgan =

Patak-e Bajgan پاتک بجگان
- Village
- Location within Iran
- Coordinates: 27°34′47″N 57°29′02″E
- Country: Iran
- Province: Kerman
- County: Manujan
- Bakhsh: Aseminun
- Rural District: Bajgan

Population (2006)
  - Total: 2,019
- Time zone: UTC+3:30 (IRST)
  - Summer (DST): UTC+4:30 (IRDT)

Patak-e Bajgan (Persian: پاتک بجگان, also Romanized as Pātak-e Bajgān; also known as Pātak, Pātak-e Shabkūh, and Pātak-e Shokūh) is a village in Bajgan Rural District, Aseminun District, Manujan County, Kerman Province, Iran. At the 2006 census, its population was 2,019, in 451 families.
