= Chah Nar =

Chah Nar چاه نر
- Village
- Location within Iran
- Coordinates: 27°45′18″N 57°26′59″E
- Country: Iran
- Province: Kerman
- County: Manujan
- Bakhsh: Aseminun
- Rural District: Bajgan

Population (2006)
  - Total: 51
- Time zone: UTC+3:30 (IRST)
  - Summer (DST): UTC+4:30 (IRDT)

Chah Nar (Persian: چاه نر, also Romanized as Chāh Nar) is a village in Bajgan Rural District, Aseminun District, Manujan County, Kerman Province, Iran. At the 2006 census, its population was 51, in 9 families.
