= Shahidabad, Manujan =

Shahidabad شهيداباد
- Village
- Location within Iran
- Coordinates: 27°39′08″N 57°23′16″E
- Country: Iran
- Province: Kerman
- County: Manujan
- Bakhsh: Aseminun
- Rural District: Bajgan

Population (2006)
  - Total: 62
- Time zone: UTC+3:30 (IRST)
  - Summer (DST): UTC+4:30 (IRDT)

Shahidabad (Persian: شهيداباد, also Romanized as Shahīdābād) is a village in Bajgan Rural District, Aseminun District, Manujan County, Kerman Province, Iran. At the 2006 census, its population was 62, in 21 families.
