= Bajgan =

Bajgan (Persian: باجگان or بجگان) may refer to:

- Bajgan, Kerman (بجگان - Bajgān)
- Bajgan, Yazd (باجگان - Bājgān)
- Bajgan Rural District, in Kerman Province
