= Deh Mian, Manujan =

Deh Mian ده ميان
- Village
- Location within Iran
- Coordinates: 27°38′47″N 57°22′01″E
- Country: Iran
- Province: Kerman
- County: Manujan
- Bakhsh: Aseminun
- Rural District: Bajgan

Population (2006)
  - Total: 286
- Time zone: UTC+3:30 (IRST)
  - Summer (DST): UTC+4:30 (IRDT)

Deh Mian (Persian: ده ميان, also Romanized as Deh Mīān) is a village in Bajgan Rural District, Aseminun District, Manujan County, Kerman Province, Iran. At the 2006 census, its population was 286, in 67 families.
