= Karamahi =

Karamahi كرماهي
- Village
- Interactive map of Karamahi
- Country: Iran
- Province: Kerman
- County: Manujan
- Bakhsh: Aseminun
- Rural District: Bajgan

Population (2006)
  - Total: 217
- Time zone: UTC+3:30 (IRST)
  - Summer (DST): UTC+4:30 (IRDT)

Karamahi (Persian: كرماهي, also Romanized as Karamāhī) is a village in Bajgan Rural District, Aseminun District, Manujan County, Kerman Province, Iran. At the 2006 census, its population was 217, in 61 families.
