= Rustai-ye Huruiyeh =

Rustai-ye Huruiyeh روستاي هوروئيه
- Village
- Interactive map of Rustai-ye Huruiyeh
- Country: Iran
- Province: Kerman
- County: Manujan
- Bakhsh: Aseminun
- Rural District: Nowdezh

Population (2006)
  - Total: 77
- Time zone: UTC+3:30 (IRST)
  - Summer (DST): UTC+4:30 (IRDT)

Rustai-ye Huruiyeh (Persian: روستاي هوروئيه, also Romanized as Rūstāī-ye Ḩūrū’īyeh) is a village in Nowdezh Rural District, Aseminun District, Manujan County, Kerman Province, Iran. At the 2006 census, its population was 77, in 20 families.
