= Abu'l-Fadl =

Abu al-Fadl or Abu'l-Fadl (Arabic: ابو الفضل) is an Arabic male given name which also occurs in place-names. It means father of virtue. It is variously transliterated as Abu'l-Fadl, Abu'l-Fazl, Abul Fazal etc. It is also used in Iran and Azerbaijan, usually in the form of Abolfazl, or Abulfaz. Most famously, this is an epithet Abbas ibn Ali, who is highly revered in Islam for his loyalty towards his brother Husayn ibn Ali during the Battle of Karbala.

It may refer to:

== People ==
- Abu'l-Faḍl is the Kunya (Teknonym) for Muhammad's uncle and companion Al-ʻAbbas ibn ʻAbd al-Muṭṭalib (566–653)
- Abu'l-Faḍl, nickname given to ʻAbbas ibn ʻAli (647–680), the son of the first Shia Imam and the fourth Rashidun Caliph
- Abu'l-Faḍl al-ʻAbbas ibn Fasanjas (876–953), statesman who served the Buyid dynasty
- Abu'l-Faḍl Jaʻfar ibn Aḥmad al-Muʻtaḍid, known as Al-Muqtadir (895–932), Abbasid Caliph in Baghdad
- Abolfadl Harawi, Persian astronomer under the patronage of the Buyid dynasty
- Abu'l-Faḍl Bayhaqi (995–1077), Persian historian and author
- Abu al-Faḍl ʻIyad ibn Amr ibn Musa ibn ʻIyad ..., known as Qadi Ayyad (1083–1149), imam in Ceuta, judge in Granada
- Abu al-Faḍl Jaʻfar ibn ʻAli al-Dimashqi, Muslim writer on commerce, from Damascus
- Abu'l-Fazl ibn Mubarak (1551–1602), vizier of the Mughal emperor Akbar, and author of Akbarnama, the official history of Akbar's reign
- Abul Fazl Mamuri, historian of the Mughal Empire during Aurangzeb's reign
- Mírzá Abu'l-Faḍl (1844–1914), Baháʼí scholar, who helped spread the Baháʼí Faith in Egypt, Turkmenistan, and the United States
- Mirza Abul Fazl (1865–1956), Qur'an translator
- Abul Fazal (writer) (1903–1983), Bangladeshi writer and educationist
- Abul Fazal Mohammad Ahsanuddin Chowdhury (1915–2001), former President of Bangladesh
- Abulfaz Elchibey (1938–2000), Azerbaijani political figure
- Abū al-Faḍ, alternate name of Iyad Ag Ghaly (born 1954), Malian Tuareg militant
- Abolfazl Jalili (born 1957), Iranian film director
- Khaled Abou El Fadl (born 1963), Kuwaiti-American law professor
- Abolfazl Attar (born 1968), Iranian film director, screenwriter & film editor
- Abolfazl Hajizadeh (born 1981), Iranian footballer
- Abolfazl Ebrahimi (born 1982), Iranian footballer
- Abolfazl Fateh (born 1966), Iranian medical doctor, journalist and political activist
- Abolfazl Zandi, Iranian taekwondo practitioner
- Seyed Abolfazl Mousavi Tabrizi (1935–2003), Iranian Cleric

== Places ==
- Abu al-Fadl, Ramle, Arab village, depopulated during the 1948 Arab-Israeli war
- Chah Abu ol Fazl, village in Chahak Rural District, in the Central District of Khatam County, Yazd Province, Iran
- Rustai-ye Abolfazl ebn Magh, village in Bajgan Rural District, Aseminun District, Manujan County, Kerman Province, Iran
- Tolombeh-ye Garuh Keshavarzi Abu ol Fazl, village in Golzar Rural District, in the Central District of Bardsir County, Kerman Province, Iran
