= Key Gin =

Key Gin كيگين
- Village
- Location within Iran
- Coordinates: 27°45′42″N 57°28′33″E
- Country: Iran
- Province: Kerman
- County: Manujan
- Bakhsh: Aseminun
- Rural District: Bajgan

Population (2006)
  - Total: 36
- Time zone: UTC+3:30 (IRST)
  - Summer (DST): UTC+4:30 (IRDT)

Key Gin (Persian: كيگين, also Romanized as Key Gīn and Kīgīn; also known as Kam Gīn) is a village in Bajgan Rural District, Aseminun District, Manujan County, Kerman Province, Iran. At the 2006 census, its population was 36, in 8 families.
