= Huruiyeh =

Huruiyeh حوروئيه
- Village
- Location within Iran
- Coordinates: 27°27′39″N 57°24′08″E
- Country: Iran
- Province: Kerman
- County: Manujan
- Bakhsh: Aseminun
- Rural District: Nowdezh

Population (2006)
  - Total: 74
- Time zone: UTC+3:30 (IRST)
  - Summer (DST): UTC+4:30 (IRDT)

Huruiyeh (Persian: حوروئيه, also Romanized as Ḩūrū’īyeh; also known as Ḩūroeeyeh) is a village in Nowdezh Rural District, Aseminun District, Manujan County, Kerman Province, Iran. At the 2006 census, its population was 74, in 14 families.
