= Larian =

Village in Kerman province, Iran

Larian Persian: لاريان
- Village
- Location within Iran
- Coordinates: 27°32′28″N 57°25′24″E
- Country: Iran
- Province: Kerman
- County: Manujan
- District: Aseminun
- Rural District: Nowdezh

Population (2016)
  - Total: 1,237
- Time zone: UTC+3:30 (IRST)

Larian (Persian: لاريان) (Note: Also romanized as Lārīān) is a village in Nowdezh Rural District of Aseminun District, Manujan County, Kerman province, Iran.

== Demographics ==
=== Population ===
At the time of the 2006 National Census, the village's population was 1,356 in 300 households. The following census in 2011 counted 1,283 people in 366 households. The 2016 census measured the population of the village as 1,237 people in 345 households. It was the most populous village in its rural district.
