= Vairagad Fort =

Ancient Indian fort

- Gadchiroli district, Maharashtra
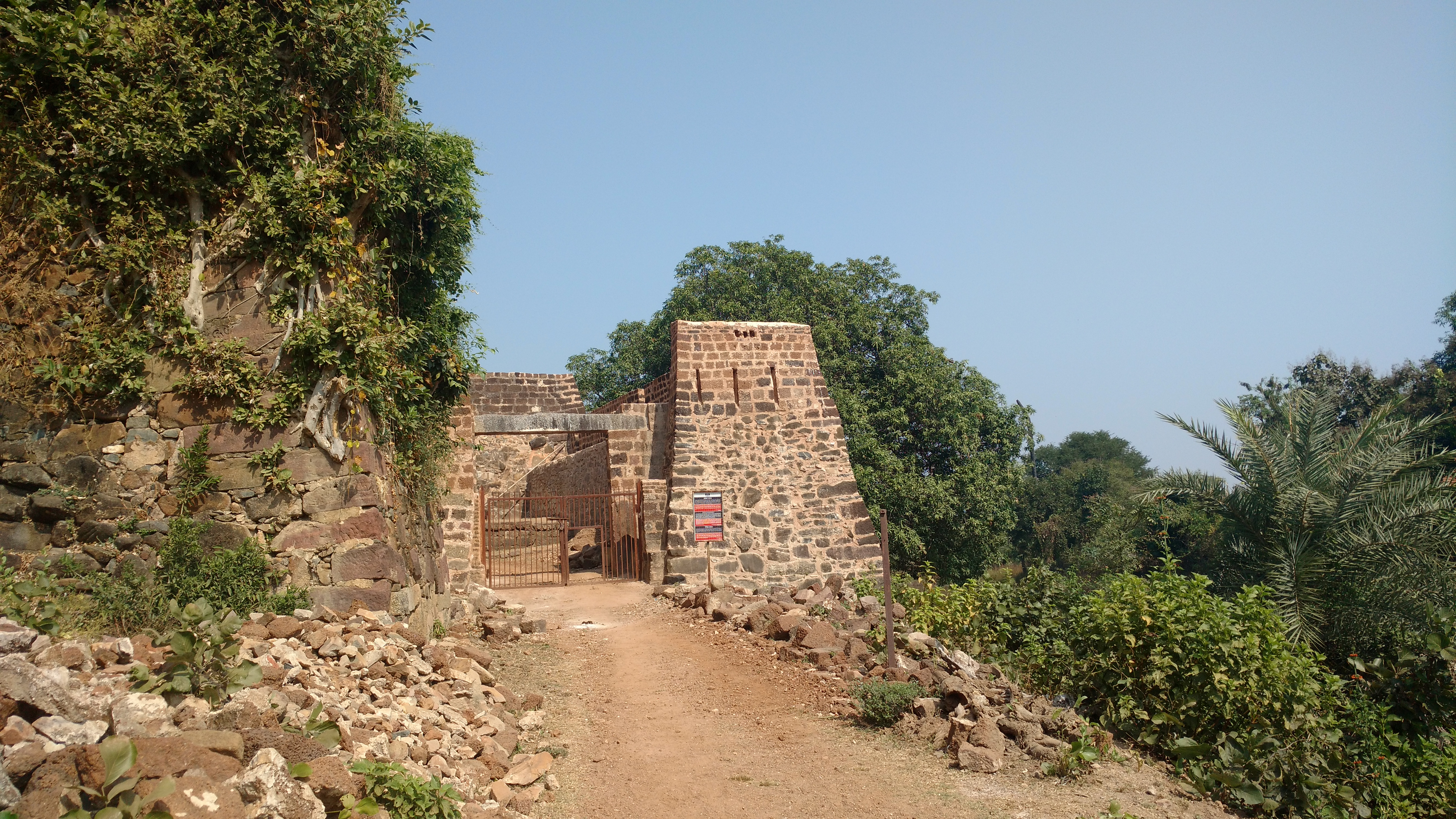
- Vairagad Fort entrance

Site information
- Type: normal fort
- Owner: Government of India
- Open to the public: Yes
- Condition: Ruins

Location
- Shown within Maharashtra
- Location within Maharashtra
- Coordinates: 20°25′56.8″N 80°05′30.1″E
- Height: 0

Site history
- Materials: Laterite Stone
- Demolished: 1818

Vairagad is a small fort situated in the Gadchiroli district of Maharashtra, India, at the confluence of rivers Khobragadhi and Satnalas. The small dusty village of same name is adjacent to the fort. The fort is situated 180 km from Nagpur and 80 km from Chandrapur.

== History ==
This village is supposed to have been established in Dvapara Yuga by a king named Vairacan (Son from a moon family). The city was ruled by the Mana chiefs, who about the 9th century fell to the Gonds. The Gonds ruled it along with Garbori and Rajgad. Vairagad once possessed diamond mines and are referred in the Ain-i-Akbari of Abul Fazal. On a hill at the foot were supposed to be a mine, now an old Idgah, and 108 Musalman tombs which appear to be of those soldiers killed in the battle when Ahmad Shah Bahamani of Bahmani Sultanate raided Vairagad around 1422. In 1925 the fort was declared as protected monument

== Places to visit ==
The fortress lies north of the village spread over a 10-acre (4.0 ha) area. There are three gates at the entrance of the fort. A river moat (Khandak) nearly 15 to 20 feet (5 to 6 m) deep runs around the fort. There are many wells inside the fort. The step well with two arches, still containing water, is in a ruined state. there are two rectangular wells with large stone coverings. Presently the Archeology dept artment has taken up work of reconstruction of the main entrance. Outside the fort proper is the tomb of the Gond Prince Durga Sah and a grave of unknown English Girl who is believed to be the daughter of a British commandant of the garrison between 1818 and 1830.

About a mile from the fort stands a small temple of Bhandareshwar similar in style to the Markandeya Temple.

== See also ==
- List of forts in Maharashtra
- Gadchiroli

== Gallery ==
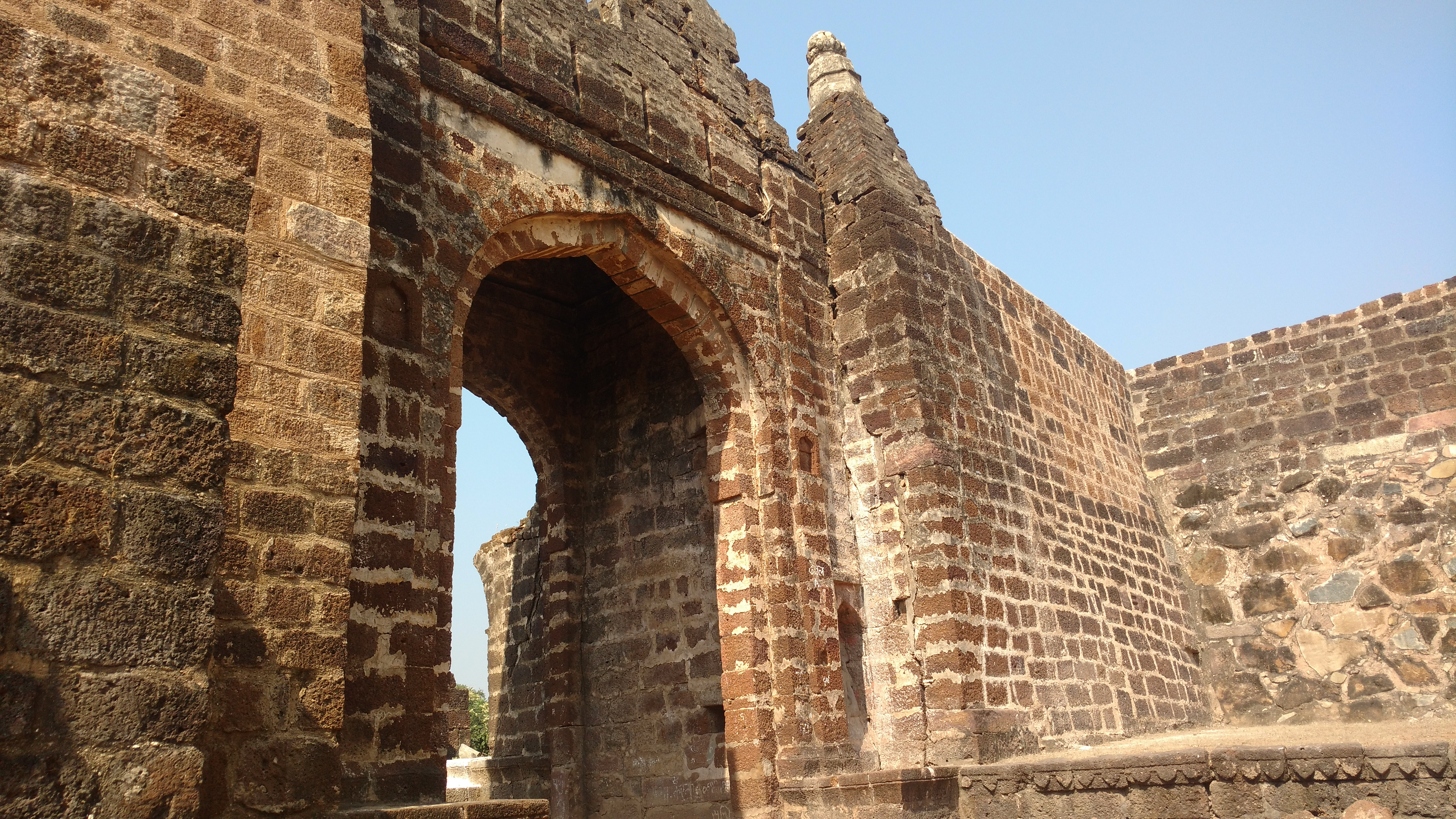
Main entrance gate

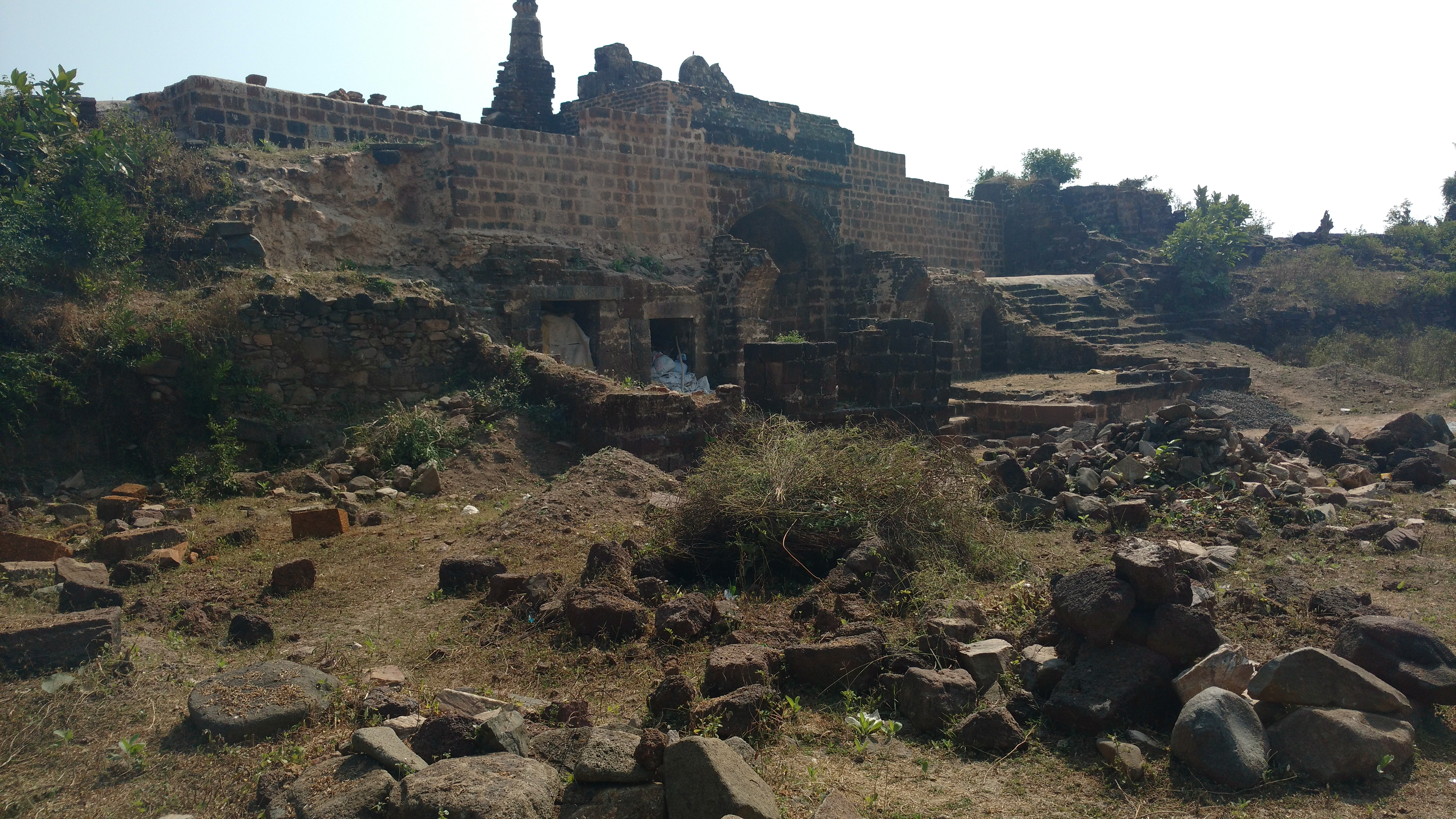
Ruins inside the fort

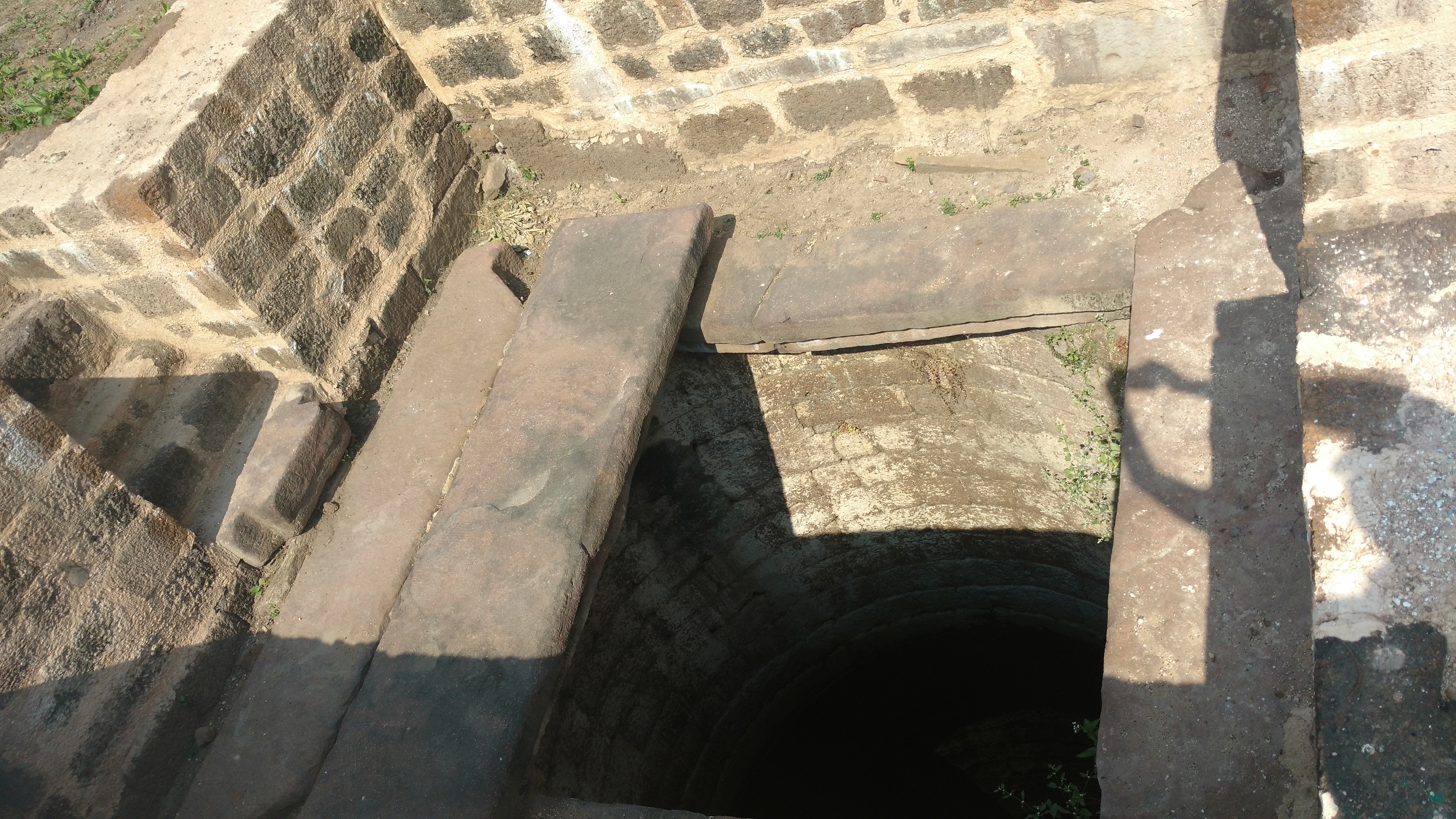
Rectangular well

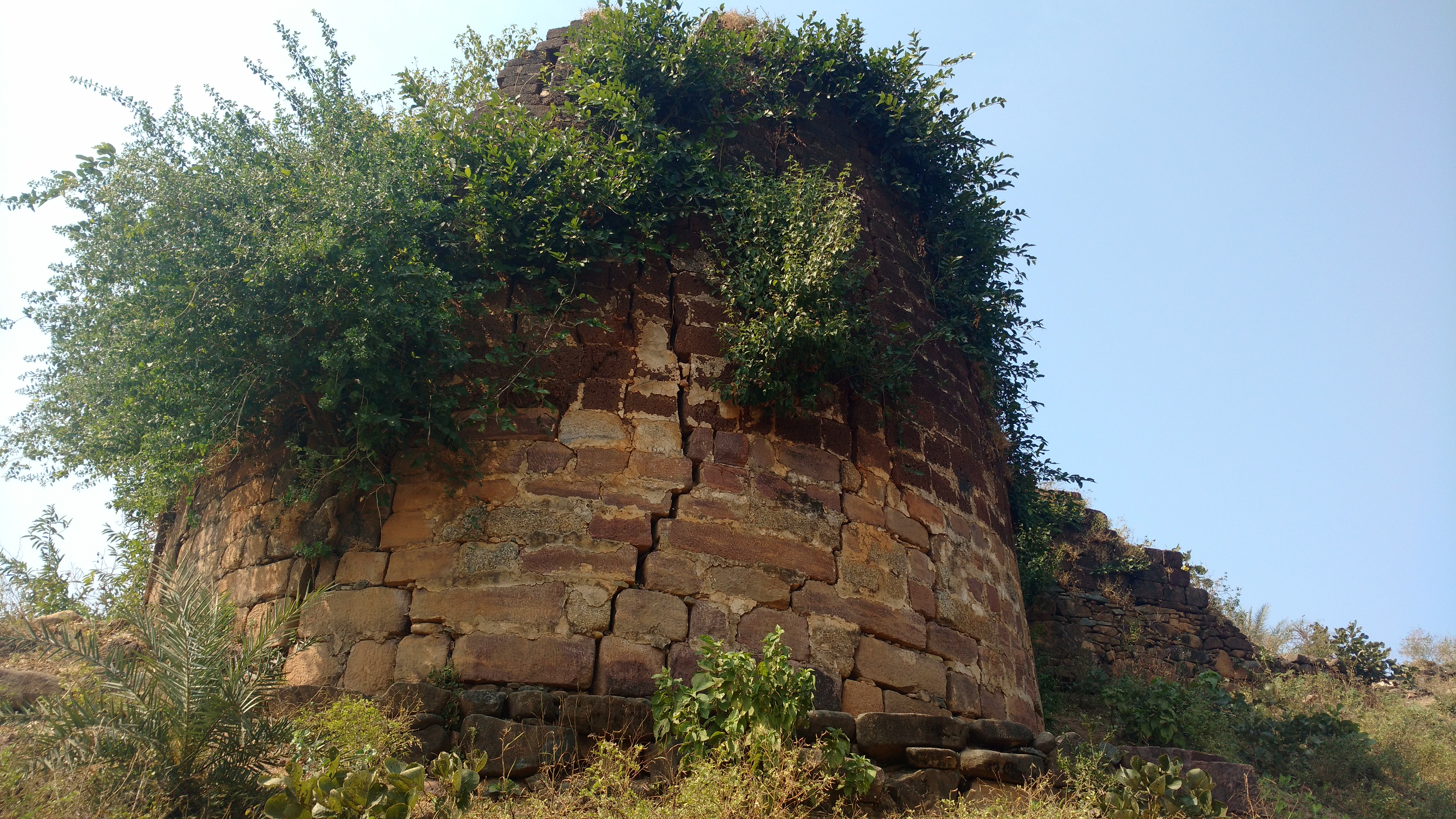
Bastion
