= Shahrak-e Abolfazl-e Bon Mogh =

Shahrak-e Abolfazl-e Bon Mogh شهرک ابوالفضل بن مغ
- village
- Location within Iran
- Coordinates: 27°39′05″N 57°18′57″E
- Country: Iran
- Province: Kerman
- County: Manujan
- Bakhsh: Aseminun
- Rural District: Bajgan

Population (2006)
  - Total: 491
- Time zone: UTC+3:30 (IRST)
  - Summer (DST): UTC+4:30 (IRDT)

Shahrak-e Abolfazl-e Bon Mogh (Persian: شهرک ابوالفضل بن مغ, also Romanized as Shahrak-e Abolfaz̤l-e Bon Mogh; also known as Kondar) is a village in Bajgan Rural District, Aseminun District, Manujan County, Kerman Province, Iran. At the 2006 census, its population was 491, in 120 families.
