= Kangeh =

Kangeh (Persian: كنگه) may refer to:

- Kangeh, Kerman
- Kangeh, Zanjan
