= Talmei Menashe =

Moshav in central Israel

Talmei Menashe: תלמי מנשה (Hebrew)
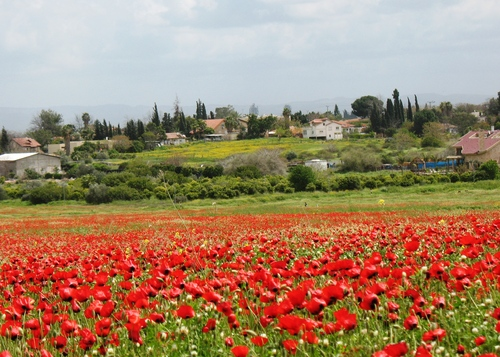

- Location within Central Israel
- Coordinates: 31°56′42″N 34°50′56″E
- Grid position: 135/150 PAL
- Country: Israel
- District: Central
- Founded: 1953
- Founder: General Zionists

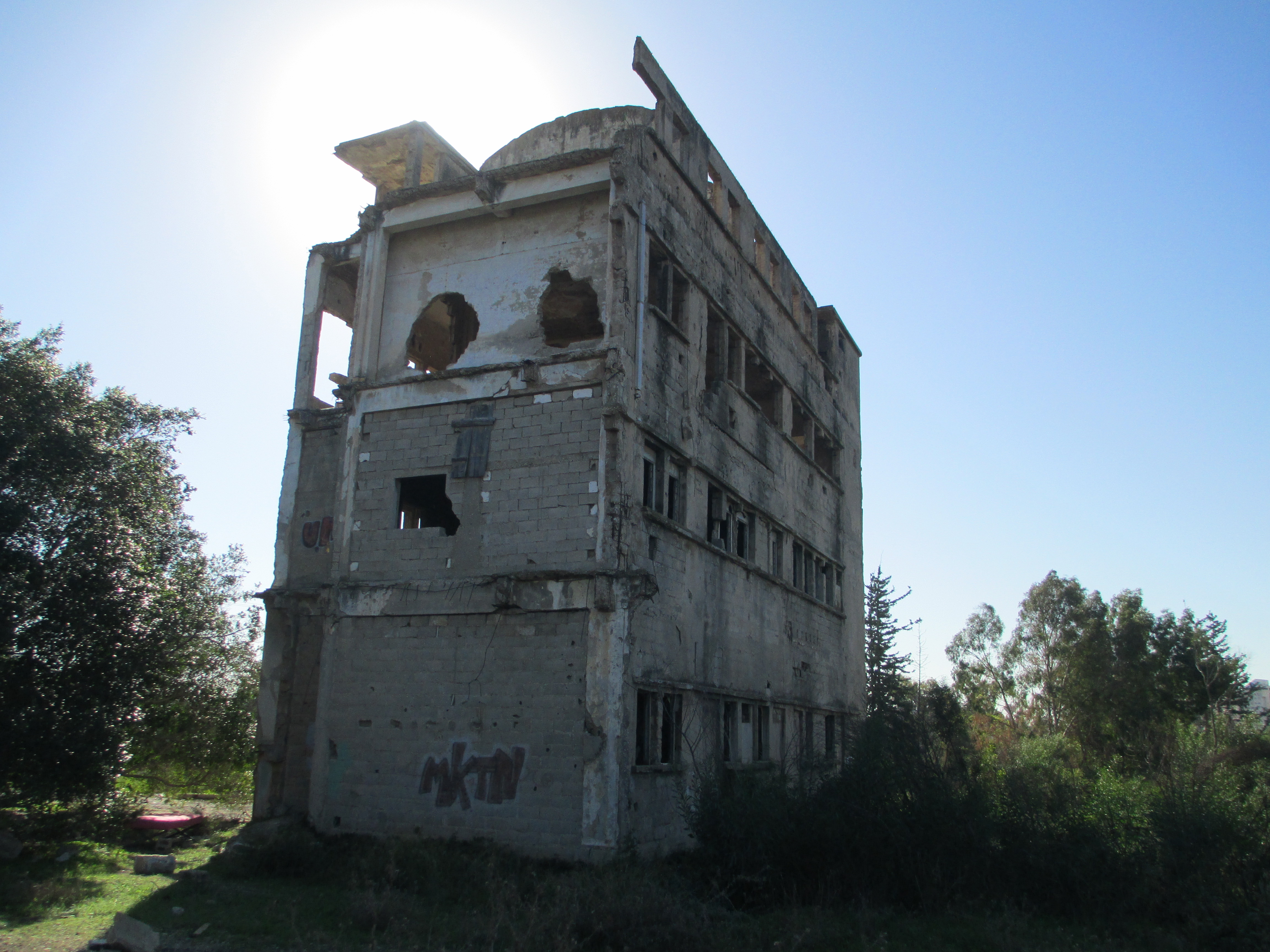
Old HQ building of Hasan Salama in Talmei Menashe, 2015

Talmei Menashe (Hebrew: תלמי מנשה) is a moshav in central Israel. It was established in 1953 by the General Zionists movement. The moshav encompasses 1,800 dunams and consists of 62 farms, 5 auxiliary farms, and a residential annex ("Harchava"). The moshav falls under the jurisdiction of Be'er Ya'akov local council, and is located to the east of Be'er Ya'akov and to the west of route 44.

== History ==
The moshav was established on the lands of the Palestinian village of Abu al-Fadl, which was depopulated during the 1948 Arab–Israeli War; the building that served as the headquarters of Hasan Salama is on the village's farmland. It was named after Menashe Meirovitch, a member of Bilu and a politician, who was dubbed "last of the Bilus" as he was the last surviving Bilu member, living long enough to see the foundation of Israel.

The first residents arrived in 1953, and mainly raised poultry, cattle and planted citrus and apricots.

In 2006, some of the farmland of the moshav was transferred to Be'er Ya'akov to build a residential neighborhood.
