= Bajgan, Kerman =

Village in Kerman province, Iran

Bajgan Persian: بجگان
- Village

- Location within Iran
- Coordinates: 27°37′24″N 57°28′16″E
- Country: Iran
- Province: Kerman
- County: Manujan
- District: Aseminun
- Rural District: Bajgan

Population (2016)
  - Total: 1,897
- Time zone: UTC+3:30 (IRST)

Bajgan (Persian: بجگان) (Note: Also romanized as Bajgān) is a village in, and the capital of, Bajgan Rural District (Note: Formerly Manujan Rural District) of Aseminun District, Manujan County, Kerman province, Iran.

== Demographics ==
=== Population ===
At the time of the 2006 National Census, the village's population was 2,602 in 553 households. The following census in 2011 counted 2,583 people in 706 households. The 2016 census measured the population of the village as 1,897 people in 574 households. It was the most populous village in its rural district.
