= Sitria =

Moshav in central Israel

Sitria: סִתְרִיָה (Hebrew)
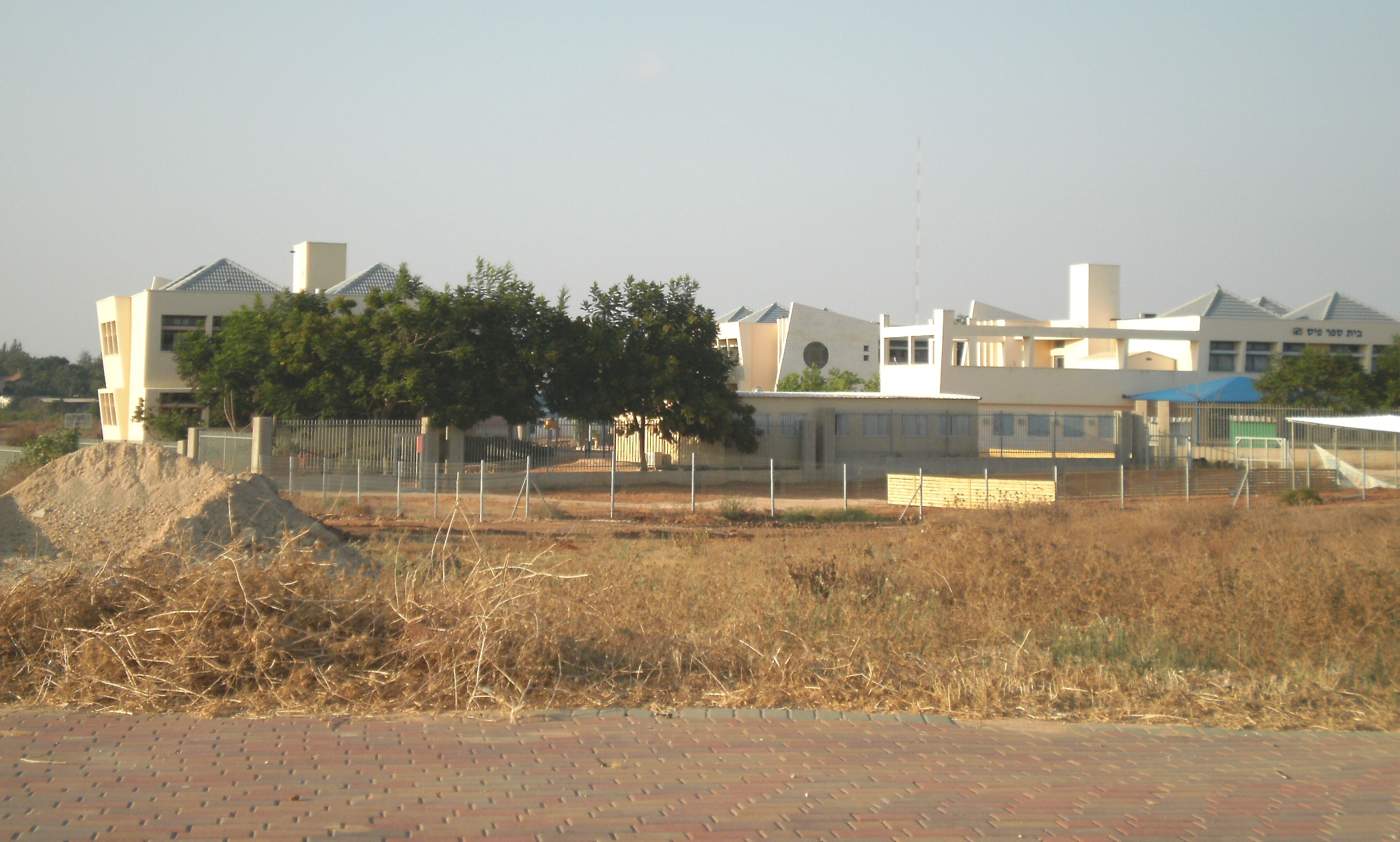
- Sitria Education Center

- Location within Central Israel
- Coordinates: 31°53′18″N 34°50′45″E
- Country: Israel
- District: Central
- Subdistrict: Ramla
- Council: Gezer
- Affiliation: Moshavim Movement
- Founded: 1949
- Founder: Polish and Romanian immigrants
- Population (2024): 1,125

Sitria (Hebrew: סִתְרִיָה) is a moshav in central Israel. Located in the Shfela near Rehovot, it falls under the jurisdiction of Gezer Regional Council. In 2024 it had a population of 1,125.

== History ==
The Palestinian Rural History Project records that prior to 1948, the Sutariyya Bedouin tribe (Arabic: السوطرية) al lived in the area, then called al-Sidra (السدرة) or Tall al-Battikh (تل البطيخ).

The moshav was founded on Lag BaOmer in 1949 on the land located near the depopulated Palestinian village of Abu al-Fadl, by 95 families from Poland and Romania who had been interned in a detention camp in Cyprus.

== Economy ==
Domaine Herzberg, a boutique winery, is located in Sitria. The moshav also operates a riding stable, Susey Adama.

== Notable people ==
- Ori Gordin (born 1969), IDF Major General
