= Nowdezh =

City in Kerman province, Iran

Nowdezh Persian: نودژ
- City
- Location within Iran
- Coordinates: 27°31′36″N 57°27′32″E
- Country: Iran
- Province: Kerman
- County: Manujan
- District: Aseminun

Population (2016)
  - Total: 5,562
- Time zone: UTC+3:30 (IRST)

Nowdezh (Persian: نودژ) (Note: Also known as Nodej and Nodezh; formerly the village of Shahid Beheshti (شهید بهشتی)) is a city in, and the capital of, Aseminun District of Manujan County, Kerman province, Iran, and also serves as the administrative center for Nowdezh Rural District.

== History ==
In 2004, the village of Shahid Beheshti (شهید بهشتی) merged with the villages of Godari-ye Nowdezh (گداری ‌نودژ), Hoseynabad-e Nowdezh (حسین‌آباد نودژ), and Yusefabad-e Nowdezh (یوسف‌آباد نودژ) to become the city of Nowdezh.

== Demographics ==
=== Population ===
At the time of the 2006 National Census, the city's population was 5,510 in 1,210 households. The following census in 2011 counted 5,284 people in 1,324 households. The 2016 census measured the population of the city as 5,562 people in 1,632 households.
