= Mana dynasty =

Indian dynasty

Manas of Wairagarh
- 650 AD–850 AD
- Capital: Wairagarh
- Government: Monarchy
- History
  - Established: 650 AD
  - Rise of the Gond leader Kol Bheel and deposition of Mana chiefs: 850 AD
Succeeded by
Kingdom of Chanda
- Today part of: India

The Mana dynasty was a dynasty that ruled what later became the Chandrapur district of Maharashtra, India, for about 200 years before being overthrown by Kol Bhil, leader of the Gonds. They ruled from the fort of Wairagarh.

== History ==
The Mana dynasty began somewhere about 650 CE, achieving supremacy over the petty chiefs

Major Lucie Smith mentions the local tradition of the line of Mana kings who ruled at Wairagarh, and were subdued by the Gonds. The Mana princes whose names he recorded were Kurumpruhoda, the first of the line, who ruled in Wairagarh. He fortified Wairagarh along with Garbori and Rajoli. Surjat Badwaik was another ruler who fortified Surjagarh, and King Gahilu built the fortress of Manikgarh, named after the patron goddess of his dynasty- Manikyadevi.

== Decline ==
Kol Bhill, a local leader of the Gondi people, led the Gonds against the Mana chiefs of Wairagarh, who had dominated the region for about 200 years. After years of warfare the Manas fell to the Gonds, who replaced them.
