= Manikgad =

Fort in India

Manikgad Fort
- Chandrapur district, Maharashtra

Site information
- Type: Hill fort
- Owner: Government of India
- Controlled by: Maratha Empire (1739-1818); United Kingdom: East India Company (1818-1857); British Raj (1857-1947)
- Open to the public: Yes
- Condition: Ruins

Location
- Location Of Manikgad fort19°40′30.6″N 79°07′31.5″E Manikgad Fort (India)
- Coordinates: 19°40′30.6″N 79°07′31.5″E
- Height: 507 MTRS

Site history
- Built by: Naga king-Gahilu
- Materials: Stone

Manikgad (also called Gadchandur) is an ancient fort in Jiwati tehsil, Chandrapur district, Maharashtra. It is a hill fort 507 metres above sea level built by the Naga kings in 9 CE. The fort is in ruins and is frequented by wild animals that live in the vicinity, such as panthers and boars. Several monuments of historical importance are nearby.

== History ==
Manikgad was built by the last Mana Naga King - Gahilu. The Mana Nagas settled in this area around 9 CE. Initially, the fort was named Manikagad after the patron deity of the Mana Nagas - Manikadevi - but later on this was shortened to Manikgad. Local legend holds that the fort was built by a Gond king named Mankyal (hence the name Manikgad). However, the lintel of the entrance gate has a Naga image carved in relief and not the Gond emblem of a lion and an elephant. So this legend is likely not true.

By the end of the 12th century A.D., the Nagas had become feudatories of Jajalladeva of Ratanpur. Huge black cut stones have been employed in the construction of the fort. The solid and imposing gateway is of good height. Rampart walls run along the enclosing hills, forming a valley with ruins of old buildings and store‑houses. A part of the southern rampart wall and its bastion has collapsed, and an iron‑strapped cannon lies in the valley below. The fort is overgrown with shrubbery and wild trees, creating a sanctuary for tigers, panthers, deer, boars, and other wildlife.

== Features ==
The fort was built of large black stones and was a formidable defense in its time. Rampart walls of the fort enclose a valley that has ruins of old buildings and store-houses. Outlines of apartments are visible against the rampart walls. The southern bastion, along with its supporting wall, collapsed. In the valley below lies a cannon that likely was mounted on that bastion. Unlike a cast-iron cannon, this cannon is made of several iron straps welded together. The gateway of the fort is intact. The Queen's palace is situated near a small dam with steps and a few rooms for bathing. Two wooden pagodas were constructed by the Forest Department. The fort area is filled with shrubs and trees.

== Gallery ==
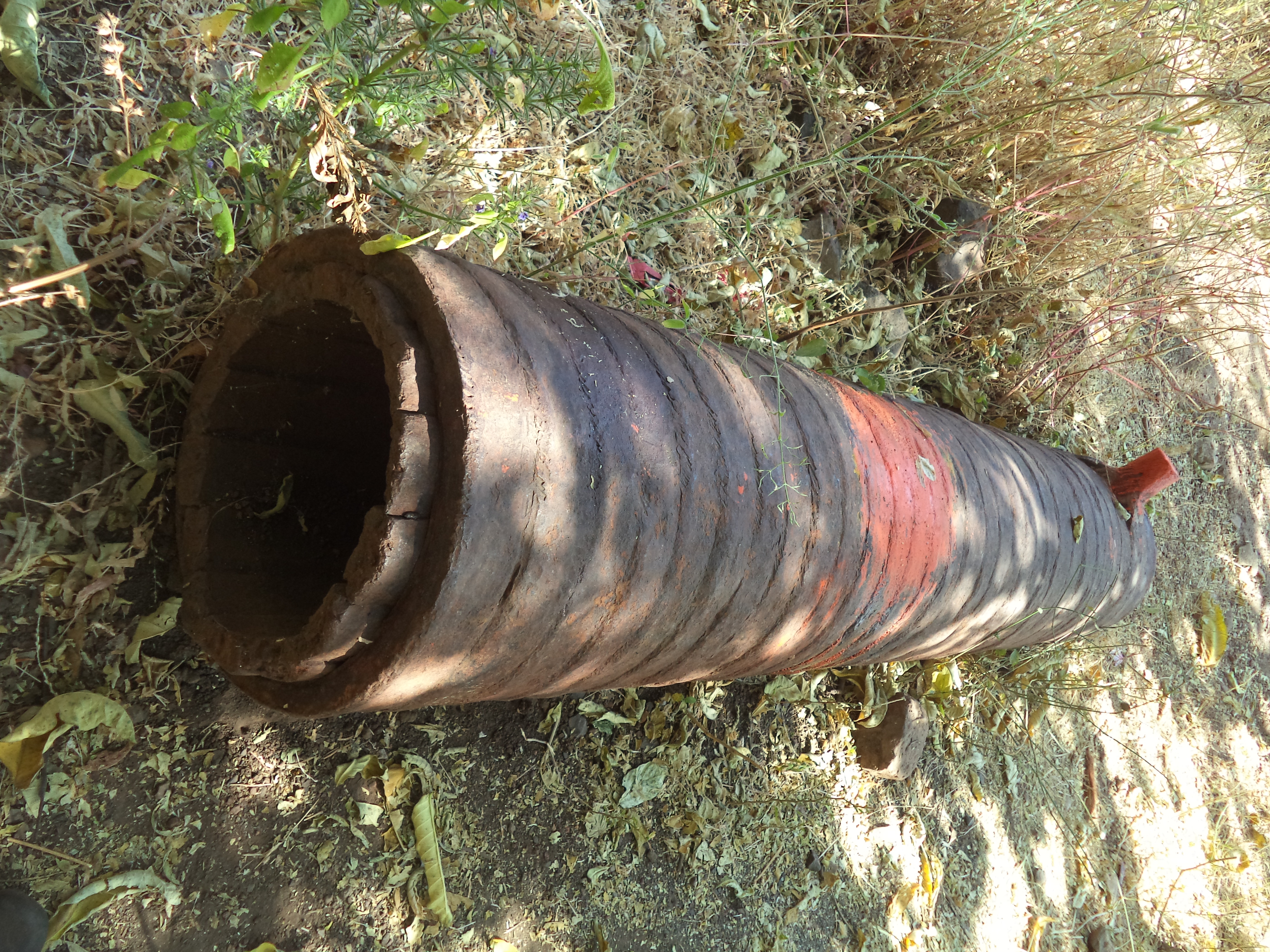
A Cannon

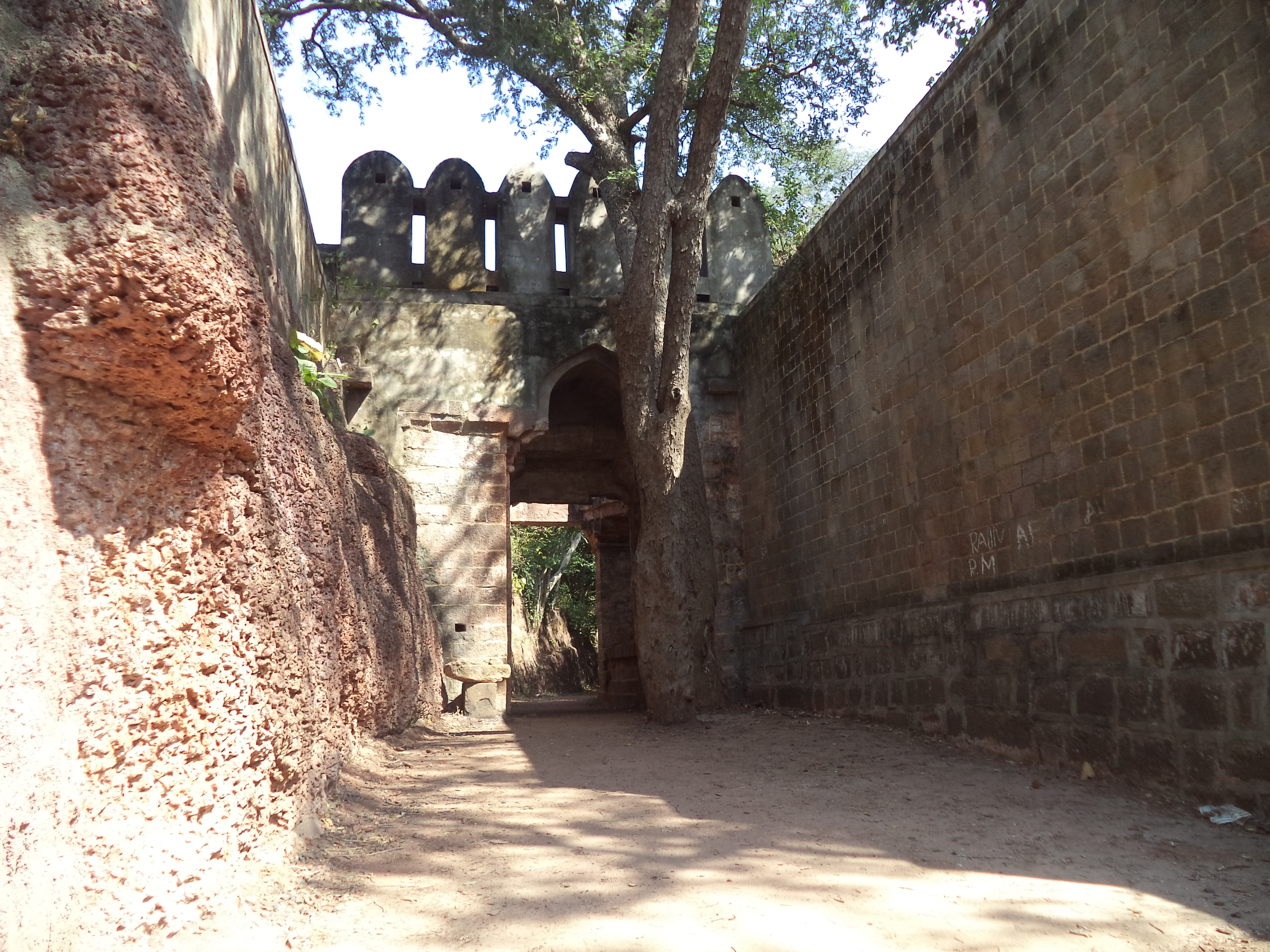
The Second gate

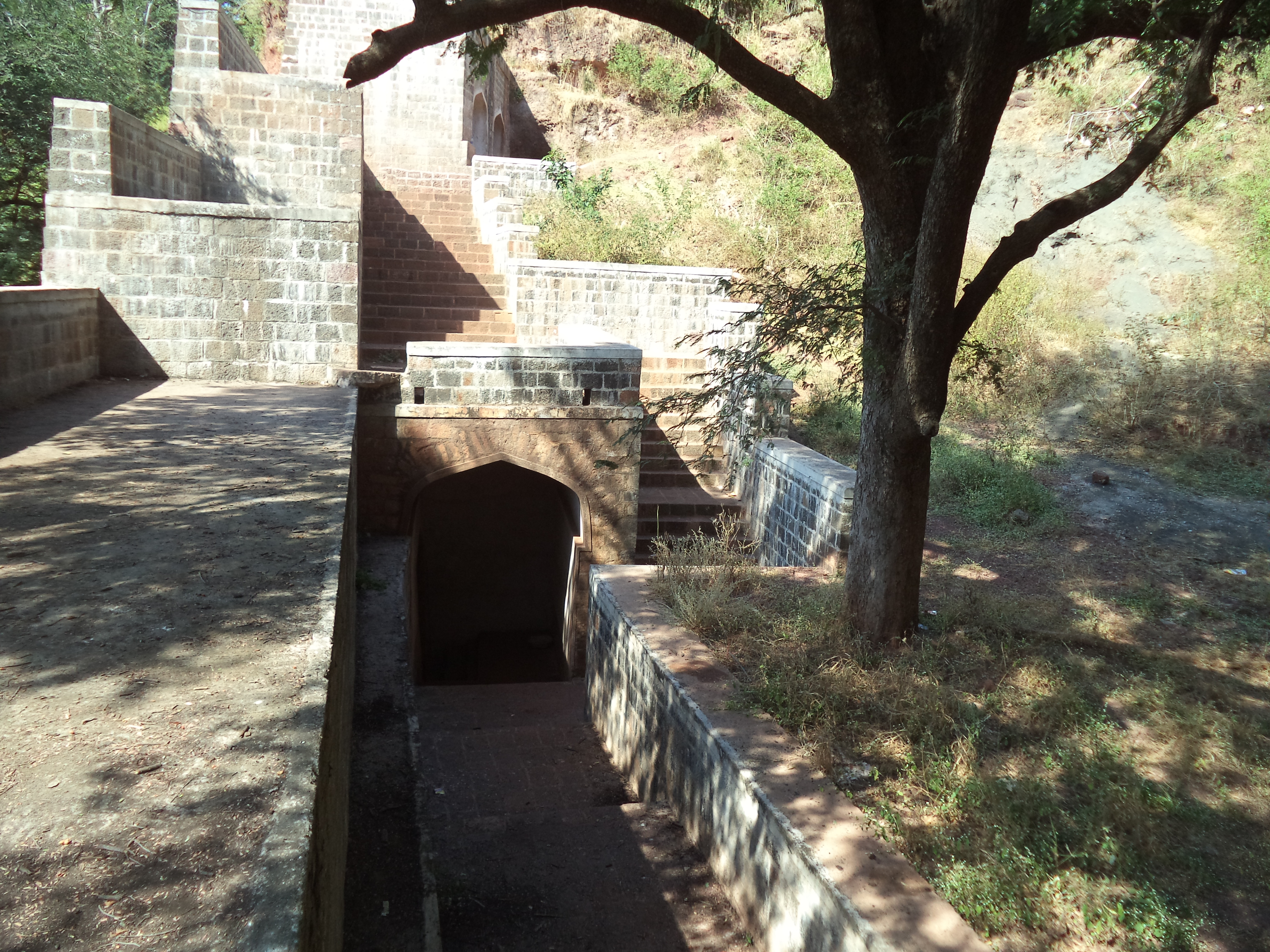
The Queens palace

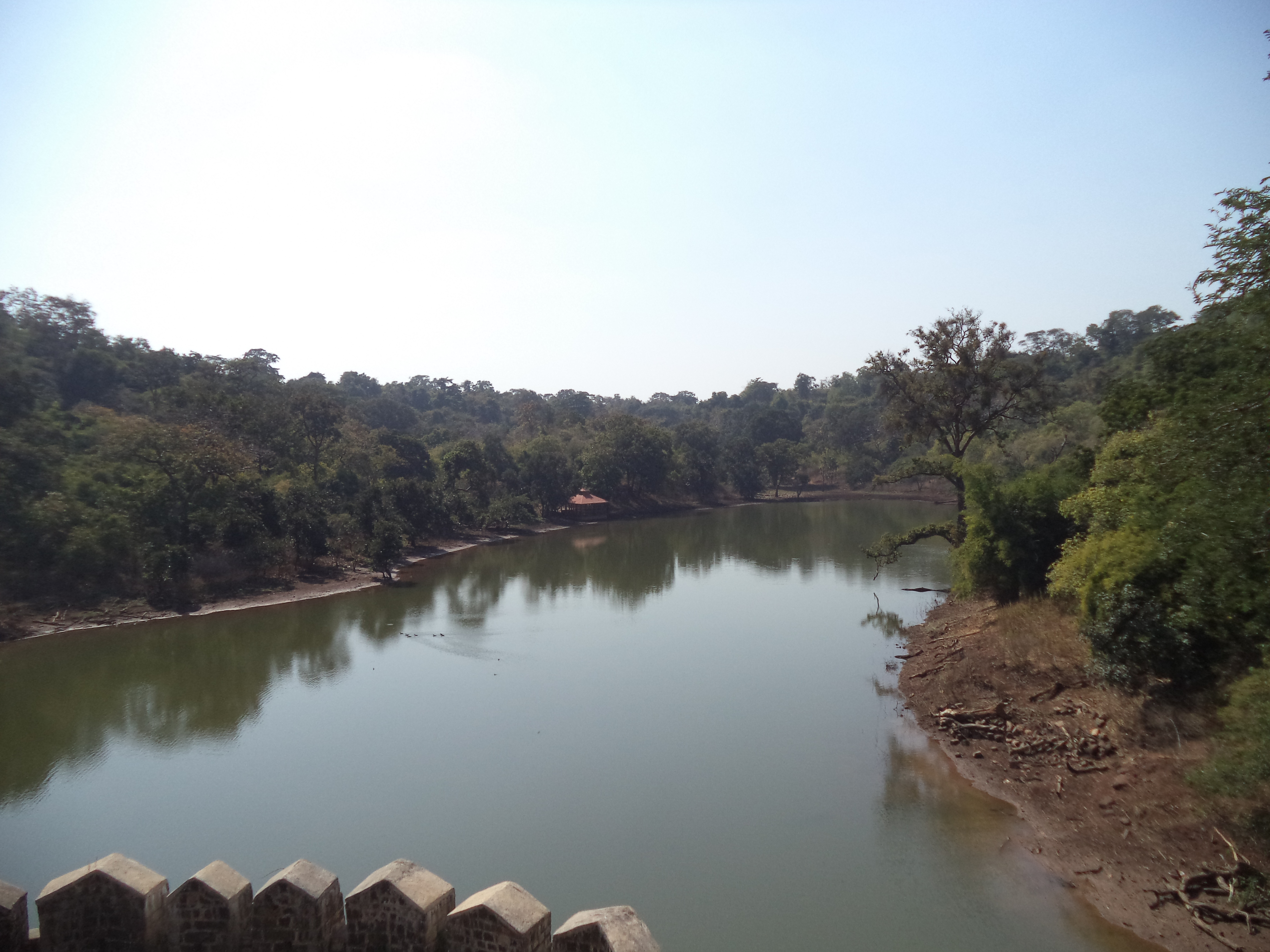
The Lake

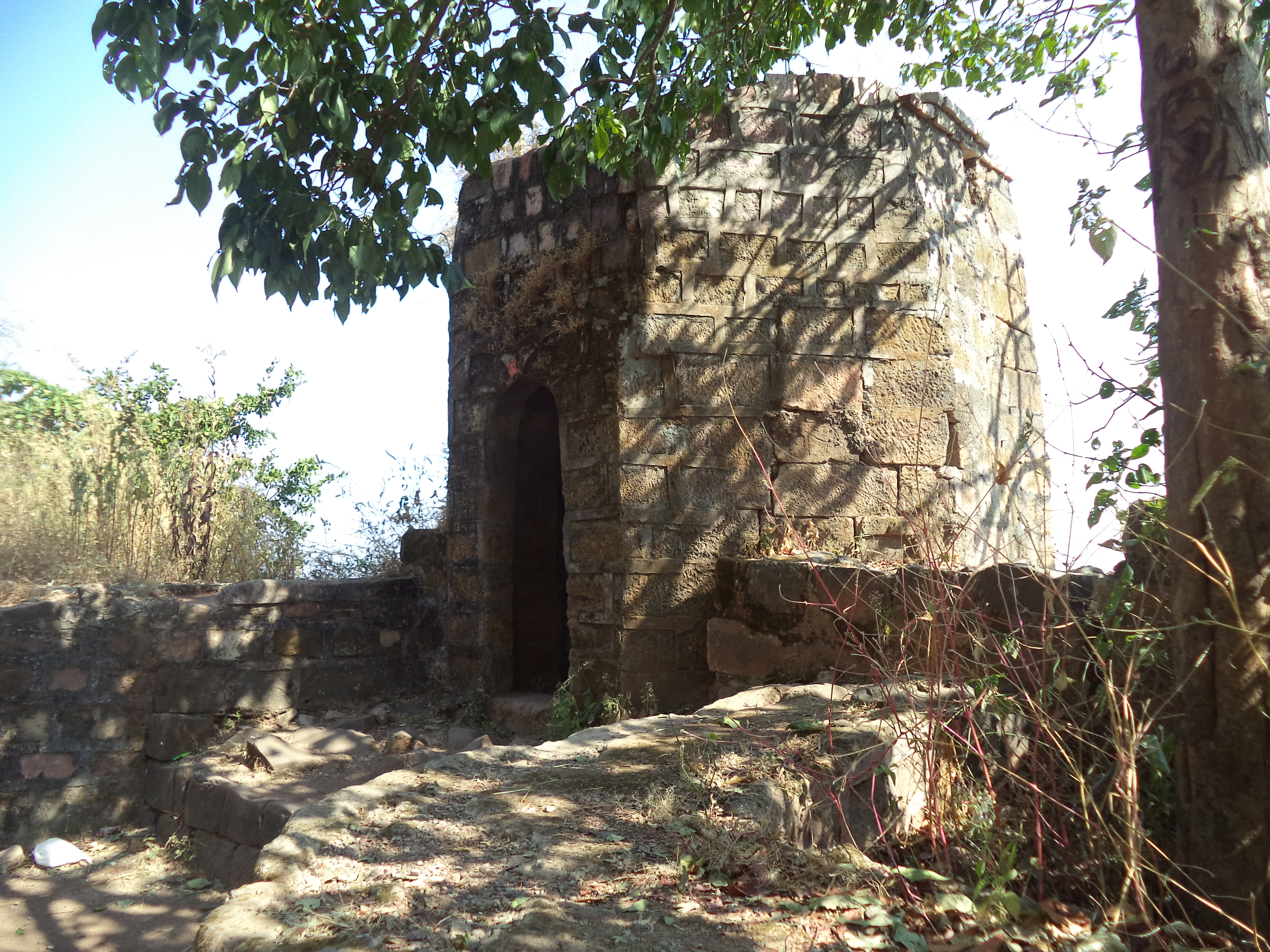
A Bastion

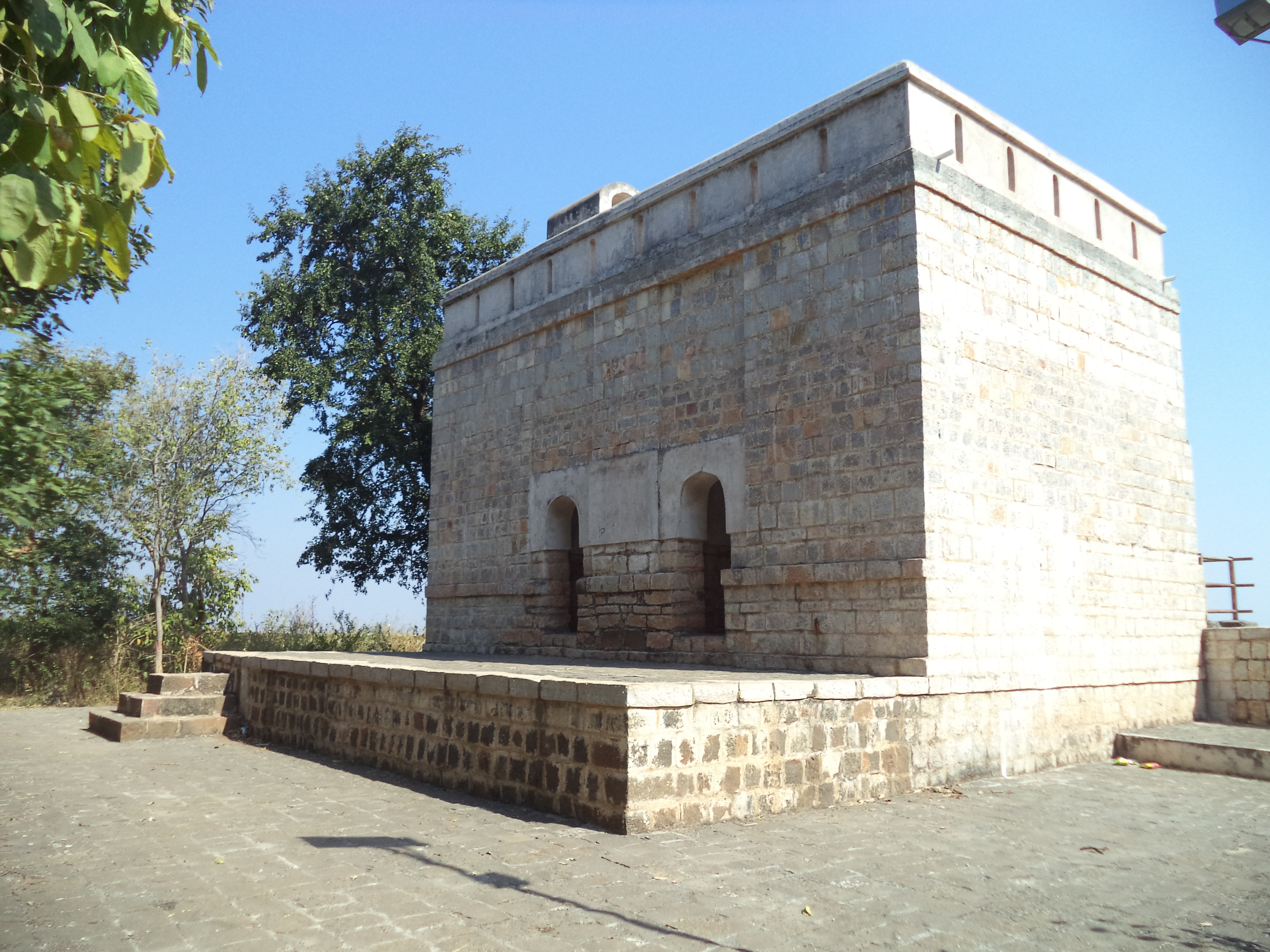
The Observation tower
