= Khaleqabad, Bardsir =

Khaleqabad خالق اباد
- Village
- Location within Iran
- Coordinates: 30°05′34″N 56°23′31″E
- Country: Iran
- Province: Kerman
- County: Bardsir
- Bakhsh: Central
- Rural District: Mashiz

Population (2006)
  - Total: 71
- Time zone: UTC+3:30 (IRST)
  - Summer (DST): UTC+4:30 (IRDT)

Khaleqabad (Persian: خالق اباد, also Romanized as Khāleqābad; also known as Khāleqābād-e Nāşerīyeh) is a village in Mashiz Rural District, in the Central District of Bardsir County, Kerman Province, Iran. At the 2006 census, its population was 71, in 16 families.
