= Khaleqabad, Ravar =

Khaleqabad خالق اباد
- Village
- Location within Iran
- Coordinates: 31°15′17″N 56°50′01″E
- Country: Iran
- Province: Kerman
- County: Ravar
- Bakhsh: Central
- Rural District: Ravar

Population (2006)
  - Total: 295
- Time zone: UTC+3:30 (IRST)
  - Summer (DST): UTC+4:30 (IRDT)

Khaleqabad (Persian: خالق اباد, also Romanized as Khāleqābād) is a village in Ravar Rural District, in the Central District of Ravar County, Kerman Province, Iran. At the 2006 census, its population was 295, in 74 families, which makes an average of 3.98 inhabitants per family.
