= Kholqabad =

Kholqabad خلق اباد
- Village
- Location within Iran
- Coordinates: 31°57′40″N 59°04′51″E
- Country: Iran
- Province: South Khorasan
- County: Khusf
- Bakhsh: Jolgeh-e Mazhan
- Rural District: Qaleh Zari

Population (2006)
  - Total: 51
- Time zone: UTC+3:30 (IRST)
  - Summer (DST): UTC+4:30 (IRDT)

Kholqabad (Persian: خلق اباد, also Romanized as Kholqābād and Khalqābād; also known as Khāleqābād and Khuliābād) is a village in Qaleh Zari Rural District, Jolgeh-e Mazhan District, Khusf County, South Khorasan Province, Iran. At the 2006 census, its population was 51, in 15 families.
