= Abul Fazl Mamuri =

Abul Fazl Mamuri was a historian of the Mughal Empire during Aurangzeb's reign and author of Tarkikh-i-Aurengzeb, Tarikh-i-Abul Fazl Mamuri and co-author of Shahjahannama.
