= Abu al-Fadl, Ramle =

Abu al-Fadl أبو الفضل/السطرية al-Satariyya
- Village
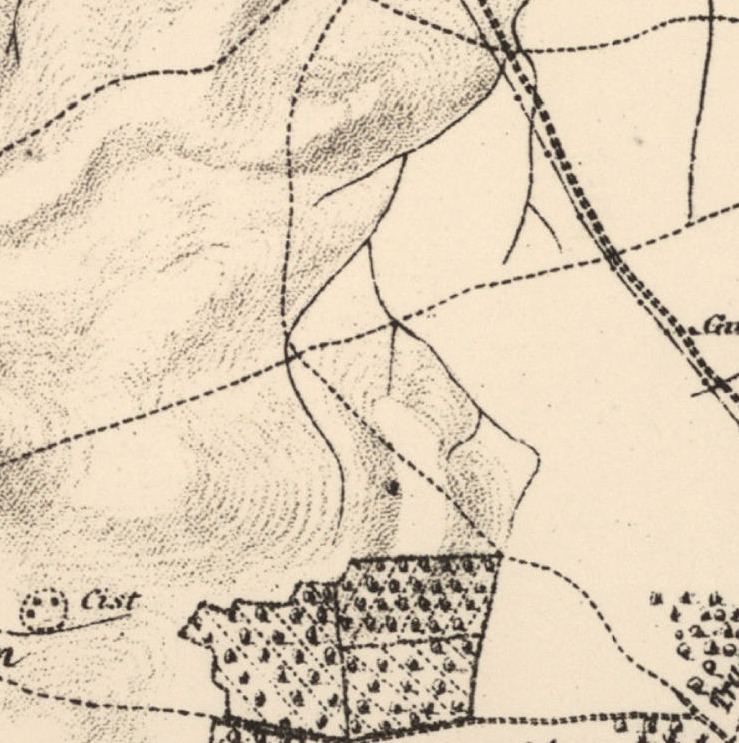
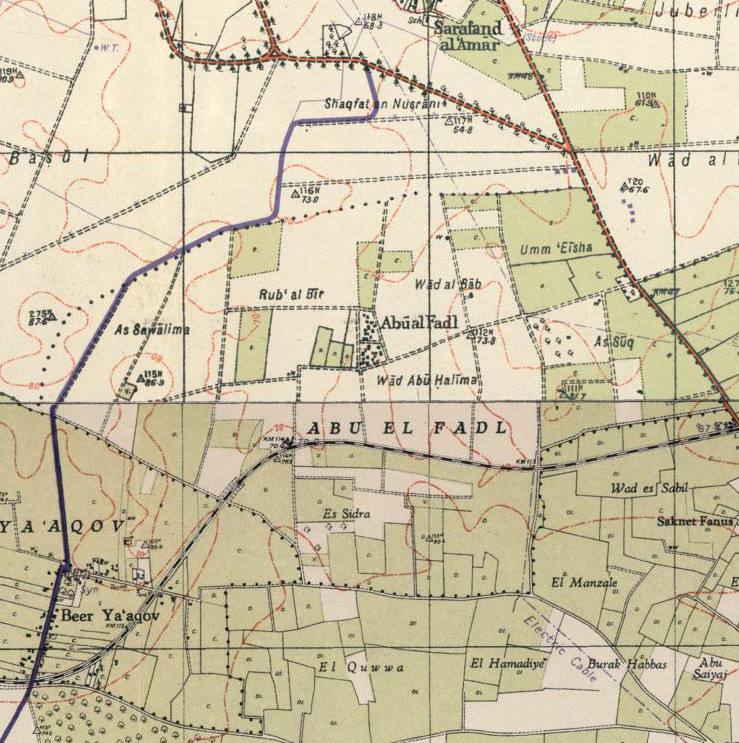
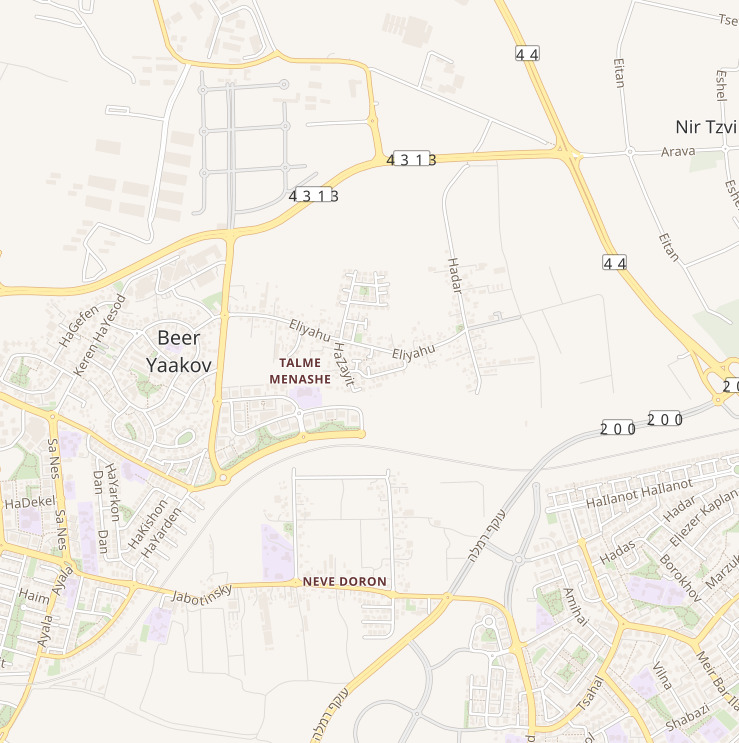
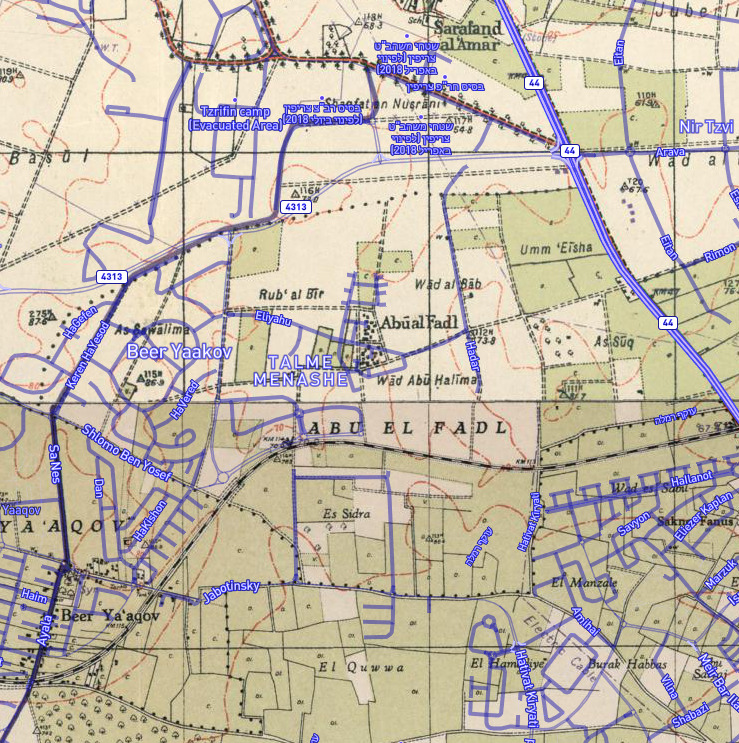
- 1870s map 1940s map modern map 1940s with modern overlay map A series of historical maps of the area around Abu al-Fadl, Ramle (click the buttons)

- Location within Mandatory Palestine
- Coordinates: 31°56′37″N 34°50′53″E
- Palestine grid: 135/150
- Geopolitical entity: Mandatory Palestine
- Subdistrict: Ramle
- Date of depopulation: 9 May 1948

Area
  - Total: 2,870 dunams (2.87 km^{2}; 1.11 sq mi)

Population (1945)
  - Total: 510
- Cause(s) of depopulation: Influence of nearby town's fall
- Current Localities: Sitria Talmey Menashe

Abu al-Fadl (Arabic: أبو الفضل/السطرية) was a Palestinian village in the Ramle Subdistrict, about 4 km (2.5 mi) northwest of Ramla in, what was until 1948, Mandatory Palestine. The village was also known as al-Satariyya. In 1945/44, the village had a population of 510.

== Location ==
The village was located just south of Sarafand al-Amar, in the Ramleh District.

== History ==
The village land was owned by the Islamic waqf of Fadl ibn Abbas, possibly a cousin of the Islamic prophet Muhammad, after whom the village was named. In the Palestine Index Gazetteer, Abu al-Fadl was classified as a hamlet.

At the time of the 1931 census, Abu al-Fadl had a population of 1565 residents, all Muslims. (Noted under the name of Es Sautariya).

In the 1945 statistics, the village had a population of 510 Muslims. A total of 818 dunums of village land was used for citrus and bananas, 1,035 dunums were used for cereals, and 822 dunums were irrigated or used for orchards.

=== 1948 and aftermath ===
In February 1948 it was reported that ten Arabs, one of them a woman, were murdered ("probably") by IZL gunmen, in a grove, where they apparently worked, near the village. This was one of the massacres of Palestinian civilians which was said to "erode Arab morale".

The villagers probably left their homes in the second week of May 1948 during Operation Barak. This campaign was undertaken by the Givati Brigade commanded by Shimon Avidan; its objective was to clear the villages south of Tel Aviv and "cause a wandering of the inhabitants of the smaller settlements in the area." Each ground assault started with a mortar bombardment, followed by the expulsion of the remaining residents and the demolition of houses.

The village was probably permanently occupied during the first stage of Operation Danny, 9–12 July 1948. This offensive, commanded by Yitzhak Rabin, resulted in the expulsion of some 70,000 people from the neighbouring towns of Lod and al-Ramla.

The Palestinian historian Walid Khalidi, described the area of Abu al-Fadl in 1992:

"Of the original village houses, no more than five still stand, deserted and nearly collapsing. One of these houses, located at the edge of a citrus grove, is made of cement blocks, with rectangular doors and windows and a tiled, sloping roof. Another house, composed of three units, is located in the middle of a citrus grove. A few cypress trees, castor oil (ricinus) plants, and cactuses grow on the site, and Israeli buildings have been constructed nearby. The surrounding lands are cultivated by Israelis."

The Israeli moshav of Sitria was established on village farmlands in 1949, Talmei Menashe was established on the site of the village proper in 1953, and some of Be'er Ya'akov and the eastern reaches of Rishon LeZion are partially on the village's land.

== See also ==
- Arab–Israeli conflict
- Ethnic cleansing
- Depopulated Palestinian locations in Israel

== Bibliography ==
- Government of Palestine, Department of Statistics (1945). Village Statistics, April, 1945.
- Hadawi, S. (1970). Village Statistics of 1945: A Classification of Land and Area ownership in Palestine. Palestine Liberation Organization Research Center. Archived from the original on 2018-12-08.
- Khalidi, W. (1992). All That Remains: The Palestinian Villages Occupied and Depopulated by Israel in 1948. Washington D.C.: Institute for Palestine Studies. ISBN 0-88728-224-5.
- Mills, E., ed. (1932). Census of Palestine 1931. Population of Villages, Towns and Administrative Areas. Jerusalem: Government of Palestine.
- Morris, B. (1987). The Birth of the Palestinian refugee problem, 1947-1949. Cambridge University Press. ISBN 0-521-33028-9.
- Morris, B. (2004). The Birth of the Palestinian Refugee Problem Revisited. Cambridge University Press. ISBN 978-0-521-00967-6.
