= Khaleqabad, Koshkuiyeh =

Khaleqabad خالق اباد
- Village
- Location within Iran
- Coordinates: 30°33′35″N 55°41′06″E
- Country: Iran
- Province: Kerman
- County: Rafsanjan
- Bakhsh: Koshkuiyeh
- Rural District: Koshkuiyeh

Population (2006)
  - Total: 82
- Time zone: UTC+3:30 (IRST)
  - Summer (DST): UTC+4:30 (IRDT)

Khaleqabad (Persian: خالق اباد, also Romanized as Khāleqābād) is a village in Koshkuiyeh Rural District, Koshkuiyeh District, Rafsanjan County, Kerman Province, Iran. At the 2006 census, its population was 82, in 16 families.
