= Nowdezh Rural District =

Rural district in Kerman province, Iran

Nowdezh Rural District Persian: دهستان نودژ
- Rural District
- Location within Iran
- Coordinates: 27°29′46″N 57°22′30″E
- Country: Iran
- Province: Kerman
- County: Manujan
- District: Aseminun
- Capital: Nowdezh

Population (2016)
  - Total: 4,243
- Time zone: UTC+3:30 (IRST)

Nowdezh Rural District (Persian: دهستان نودژ) is in Aseminun District of Manujan County, Kerman province, Iran. It is administered from the city of Nowdezh. (Note: Formerly the village of Shahid Beheshti)

== Demographics ==
=== Population ===
At the time of the 2006 National Census, the rural district's population was 3,030 in 653 households. There were 4,310 inhabitants in 1,187 households at the following census of 2011. The 2016 census measured the population of the rural district as 4,243 in 1,252 households. The most populous of its 32 villages was Larian, with 1,237 people.
