= Bajgan Rural District =

Rural district in Kerman province, Iran

Bajgan Rural District Persian: دهستان بجگان
- Rural District
- Location within Iran
- Coordinates: 27°40′44″N 57°22′48″E
- Country: Iran
- Province: Kerman
- County: Manujan
- District: Aseminun
- Capital: Bajgan

Population (2016)
  - Total: 6,463
- Time zone: UTC+3:30 (IRST)

Bajgan Rural District (Persian: دهستان بجگان) (Note: Formerly Manujan Rural District (دهستان منوجان)) is in Aseminun District of Manujan County, Kerman province, Iran. Its capital is the village of Bajgan.

== Demographics ==
=== Population ===
At the time of the 2006 National Census, the rural district's population was 6,545 in 1,465 households. There were 6,796 inhabitants in 1,870 households at the following census of 2011. The 2016 census measured the population of the rural district as 6,463 in 1,962 households. The most populous of its 58 villages was Bajgan, with 1,897 people.
