= Aseminun District =

District in Kerman province, Iran

Aseminun District Persian: بخش آسمینون
- District
- Location within Iran
- Coordinates: 27°34′42″N 57°22′52″E
- Country: Iran
- Province: Kerman
- County: Manujan
- Capital: Nowdezh

Population (2016)
  - Total: 16,268
- Time zone: UTC+3:30 (IRST)

Aseminun District (Persian: بخش آسمینون) is in Manujan County, Kerman province, Iran. Its capital is the city of Nowdezh. (Note: Formerly the village of Shahid Beheshti)

== History ==
After the 2006 National Census, Deh Kahan Rural District was separated from the district to join the Central District of Kahnuj County.

== Demographics ==
=== Population ===
At the time of the 2006 census, the district's population was 24,561 in 5,342 households. The following census in 2011 counted 16,390 people in 4,381 households. The 2016 census measured the population of the district as 16,268 inhabitants in 4,846 households.

=== Administrative divisions ===
Aseminun District Population
| Administrative Divisions | 2006 | 2011 | 2016 |
|---|---|---|---|
| Bajgan RD (Note: Formerly Manujan Rural District) | 6,545 | 6,796 | 6,463 |
| Deh Kahan RD (Note: Transferred to Kahnuj County) | 9,476 | | |
| Nowdezh RD | 3,030 | 4,310 | 4,243 |
| Nowdezh (city) | 5,510 | 5,284 | 5,562 |
| Total | 24,561 | 16,390 | 16,268 |
RD = Rural District
